= List of major roads in rural Western Australia =

Route Markers

| National Highway | National Route |
| State Route | Tourist Drive |

Major roads in rural Western Australia connect regional and remote centres of Western Australia, forming the basis of the road network outside of Metropolitan Perth. Main Roads Western Australia controls and maintains these roads and highways. Some of these roads, or portions of them, are designated and signposted as part of a road route, as they are of national or regional importance. Additionally, roads through areas of scenic or historic significance are designated as part of a Tourist Drive. Each route has a unique marker: National Highways have gold numbers on a green shield, National Routes have black numbers on a white shield, State Routes have white numbers on a blue shield, Tourist Drives have white numbers on a brown shield.

| Road | From | Via | To | Notes |
|---|---|---|---|---|
| Agnew Sandstone Road | Sandstone | Depot Springs | Leinster | |
| Albany Highway | Perth | Armadale | Albany | State Routes 30 / 107 |
| Anzac Drive | West Kalgoorlie | | South Boulder | |
| Arthur Road | Arthur River | | Wagin | State Route 107 |
| Australind Bypass | Leschenault | Waterloo | Bunbury | National Route 1 |
| Bannister-Marradong Road | Bannister | Boddington | Marradong | |
| Bindoon-Moora Road | Bindoon | Wannamal | Moora | State Route 116 |
| Bingarn Road | Mount Sheila | | Tom Price | |
| Borden-Bremer Bay Road | Magitup | Boxwood Hill | Bremer Bay | |
| Boyanup-Picton Road | Boyanup | Dardanup | Picton | |
| Boyup Brook-Kojonup Road | Boyup Brook | Mayanup | Kojonup | |
| Brain Street | South Western Highway | Manjimup | Muir Highway | State Route 102 |
| Brand Highway | Muchea | Gingin | Geraldton | National Route 1 |
| Bridgetown-Boyup Brook Road | Bridgetown | Winnejup | Boyup Brook | |
| Brockman Highway | Karridale | Nannup | Bridgetown | State Route 10 |
| Brookton-Corrigin Road | Brookton | Bulyee | Corrigin | State Route 40 |
| Brookton Highway | Perth | Westdale | Brookton | State Route 40 |
| Broome Road | Broome | Roebuck | Great Northern Highway | |
| Broomehill-Gnowangerup Road | Broomehill | Pallinup | Gnowangerup | |
| Bruce Rock-Merredin Road | Bruce Rock | Korbel | Merredin | |
| Bruce Rock-Quairading Road | Bruce Rock | Kwolyinl | Quairading | |
| Bullfinch Road | Bullfinch | Corinthia | Southern Cross | |
| Burkett Road | North West Coastal Highway | Exmouth Gulf | Minilya-Exmouth Road | |
| Burrup Road | Dampier | | Burrup | |
| Bussell Highway | Bunbury | Busselton | Augusta | State Route 10 |
| Busselton Bypass | Bussell Highway, Busselton | Bovell | Bussell Highway, Vasse | State Route 10 |
| Calingiri Road | Wannamal | Old Plains | Calingiri | |
| Calingiri-Wongan Hills Road | Calingiri | Lake Ninan | Wongan Hills | |
| Caves Road | Busselton | Dunsborough | Augusta | |
| Chapman Valley Road | Waggrakine | Nabawa | South Yuna | |
| Chester Pass Road | Albany | Amelup | Toompup | National Route 1 |
| Coalfields Highway | Roelands | Bowelling | Arthur River | State Route 107 |
| Collie-Williams Road | Collie | Yourdamung Lake | Williams | |
| Collie-Preston Road | Collie | Preston Settlement | Mumballup | |
| Coolgardie–Esperance Highway | Coolgardie | Norseman | Esperance | National Highway 94 / National Route 1 |
| Coolimba-Eneabba Road | Coolimba | | Eneabba | |
| Coral Bay Road | Lyndon | | Coral Bay | |
| Corrigin-Kondinin Road | Corrigin | Gorge Rock | Kondinin | State Route 40 |
| Corrigin-Kulin Road | Gorge Rock | | Kulin | |
| Dampier Highway | Dampier | Gap Ridge | Karratha | |
| Denmark-Mount Barker Road | Denmark | Mount Lindesay | Mount Barker | |
| Derby-Gibb River Road | Derby | Wunaamin-Miliwundi Ranges | Gibb River | |
| Derby Highway | Derby | | Willare | |
| Donnybrook-Boyup Brook Road | Donnybrook | Mumballup | Boyup Brook | |
| Dumbleyung-Lake Grace Road | Dumbleyung | Kukerin | Lake Grace | State Route 107 |
| Edward Road | Woorree | Bootenal | Walkaway | |
| Estuary Drive | Pelican Point | | Vittoria | |
| Eyre Highway | Norseman | Balladonia | WA/SA border | National Highway 1. Continues east to Port Augusta, South Australia as National Highway A1 |
| Formby South Road | Formby | North Stirlings | Stirling Range National Park | |
| Forrest Highway | Ravenswood | West Pinjarra | Lake Clifton | State Route 2 |
| George Grey Drive | Yallabatharra | | Kalbarri | |
| Geraldton-Mount Magnet Road | Geraldton | Mullewa | Mount Magnet | State Route 123 |
| Gibb River-Wyndham Road | Gibb River | Durack | Lake Argyle | |
| Gnowangerup-Jerramungup Road | Gnowangerup | Ongerup | Jerramungup | |
| Goldfields Highway | Meekatharra | Wiluna | Kambalda | Alternate National Route 94: Kalgoorlie to Kambalda |
| Goodwood Road | Capel | Capel River | Donnybrook | |
| Goomalling-Wyalkatchem Road | Goomalling | Dowerin | Wyalkatchem | |
| Great Eastern Highway | Perth | Southern Cross | Kalgoorlie | National Highway 94 / Alternate National Route 94 |
| Great Northern Highway | Perth | Port Hedland | Wyndham | National Highways 1 / 95 / National Route 1 |
| Great Southern Highway | The Lakes | York | Cranbrook | State Route 120 |
| Greenlands Road | Nirimba | West Pinjarra | Blythewood | |
| Gubinge Road, Broome | Djugun | Cable Beach | Minyirr | |
| Hannan Street, Kalgoorlie | Somerville | Kalgoorlie | Williamstown | Alternate National Route 94 |
| Hanrahan Road | South Coast Highway | Albany | Frenchman Bay Road | |
| Harbour Road, Esperance | Chadwick | Esperance | West Beach | National Route 1: South Coast Highway to Norseman Road |
| Harbour Road, Wyndham | McPhee Street, Wyndham | | Wyndham Port | |
| Hopetoun-Ravensthorpe Road | Hopetoun | | Ravensthorpe | |
| Hyden-Lake King Road | Hyden | Holt Rock | Lake King | State Route 40 |
| Indian Ocean Drive | Lancelin | Cervantes | Arrowsmith | State Route 60 |
| John Willcock Link, Geraldton | Mahomets Flats | Beachlands | West End | |
| Jurien Road | Jurien Bay | Hill River | Boothendarra | |
| Karijini Drive | Juna Downs | Karijini National Park | Tom Price | |
| Karratha Road | Stove Hill | | Karratha | |
| Katanning-Nyabing Road | Katanning | Badgebup | Nyabing | |
| Kojonup-Katanning Road | Kojonup | Carrolup | Katanning | |
| Kondinin-Hyden Road | Kondinin | Karlgarin | Hyden | |
| Kulin-Lake Grace Road | Kulin | Kuender | Lake Grace | |
| Kwinana Freeway | Perth | Stake Hill | Ravenswood | State Route 2 |
| Lake Grace-Newdegate Road | Lake Grace | | Newdegate | State Route 107 |
| Laverton-Leonora Road | Laverton | | Leonora | |
| Loch Street, Derby | Derby Highway | | Jetty Road, Derby | |
| Madigan Road | Gap Ridge | | Stove Hill | |
| Mandjoogoordap Drive | Stake Hill | Meadow Springs | Mandurah | State Route 19 |
| Mandurah Road | Perth | Mandurah | Halls Head | National Route 1 |
| Marble Bar Road | Newman | Marble Bar | Port Hedland | State Route 138. |
| Menang Drive | McKail | Willyung | King River | Part of the Albany ring road (other parts not yet constructed) |
| Merredin-Nungarin Road | Merredin | Nukarni | Nungarin | |
| The Midlands Road | Walebing | Moora; Mingenew | Yardarino | State Route 116 |
| Mingenew-Morawa Road | Mingenew | Mount Budd | Morawa | |
| Mingenew-Mullewa Road | Mingenew | Wongoondy | Mullewa | |
| Minilya-Exmouth Road | Minilya | Lyndon | Exmouth | |
| Monkey Mia Road | Denham | Francois Peron National Park | Monkey Mia | |
| Moonyoonooka-Narra Tarra Road | Moonyoonooka | | Narra Tarra | |
| Morrell Road | Moonyoonooka-Narra Tarra Road | Narra Tarra | Chapman Valley Road | |
| Mount Magnet-Sandstone Road | Mount Magnet | Paynesville | Sandstone | |
| Muir Highway | Manjimup | Lake Muir | Mount Barker | State Route 102 |
| Mullewa-Wubin Road | Mullewa | Morawa | Wubin | |
| Nanutarra-Munjina Road | Wittenoom | | Mulga Downs | |
| Newdegate-Ravensthorpe Road | Newdegate | Lake King | Ravensthorpe | State Route 40 (Lake King to Ravensthorpe) / State Route 107 (Newdegate to Lake King) |
| North West Coastal Highway | Geraldton | Carnarvon | Port Hedland | National Route 1 |
| Northam-Pithara Road | Northam | Wongan Hills | Pithara | State Route 115 |
| Northam-Toodyay Road | Northam | Katrine | Toodyay | State Route 120 |
| Northam-York Road | Northam | Wilberforce | York | State Route 120 |
| Nungarin-Wyalkatchem Road | Nungarin | Trayning | Wyalkatchem | |
| Nyabing-Pingrup Road | Nyabing | | Pingrup | |
| Old Coast Road | Mandurah | Dawesville | Bunbury | National Route 1 |
| Pannawonica Road | North West Coastal Highway | Fortescue | Pannawonica | |
| Paraburdoo-Tom Price Road | Rocklea | Paraburdoo | Tom Price | |
| Peel Terrace | Northam | | Northam-York Road | State Route 120 in Northam |
| Pemberton-Northcliffe Road | Pemberton | Callcup | Northcliffe | State Route 10 |
| Pingrup-Lake Grace Road | Pingrup | | Lake Grace | |
| Pinjarra Road | Mandurah | Ravenswood | Pinjarra | |
| Pinjarra-Williams Road | Pinjarra | Marradong | Williams | |
| Point Samson-Roebourne Road | Point Samson | Wickham | Roebourne | |
| Port Drive, Broome | Broome | Minyirr | Roebuck Bay | |
| Port Gregory Road | Northampton | Yallabatharra | Kalbarri | |
| Princess Royal Drive | Mount Elphinstone | Albany | Port Albany | |
| Quairading-York Road | Quairading | Kauring | York | |
| Railway Road | Boyanup | Elgin | Capel | |
| Raymond Road | Australind Bypass | Roelands | South Western Highway | |
| Ripon Hills Road | Marble Bar | | Oakover River | |
| Robertson Drive, Bunbury | Australind Bypass | | Bussell Highway | Bunbury Bypass. National Route 1 (north of South Western Highway) / State Route 10 (south of South Western Highway) |
| Robinson Street, Carnarvon | Kingsford | | Carnarvon | |
| Shark Bay Road | Hamelin Pool | Nanga | Denham | Tourist Drive 353 (World Heritage Drive) |
| South Coast Highway | Walpole | Albany; Ravensthorpe | Esperance | National Route 1 |
| South Western Highway | Perth | Bunbury | Walpole | National Route 1 (Bunbury to Walpole) / State Route 20 (Perth to Bunbury) / State Route 107 (Bunbury to Roelands) |
| Southern Cross-Marvel Lock Road | Southern Cross | | Marvel Lock | |
| Stewart Road | Darradup | | Biddelia | |
| Sues Road | Busselton | Baudin | Darradup | |
| Vasse Highway | Busselton | Nannup; Pemberton | Diamond Tree | State Route 10 (Nannup to Pemberton) / State Route 104 (Busselton to Nannup) |
| Victoria Highway | Lake Argyle | Kununurra | WA/NT border | National Highway 1. Continues east to Katherine, Northern Territory |
| Wagin-Dumbleyung Road | Wagin | Ballaying | Dumbleyung | State Route 107 |
| Wanneroo Road | Perth | Wilbinga | Woodridge | |
| Warlu Road | Cooya Pooya | | Millstream-Chichester National Park | |
| Williams-Kondinin Road | Williams | Wickepin | Kondinin | |
| Willinge Drive, Bunbury | Vittoria | | Picton | |
| Wilson Street, Port Hedland | Great Northern Highway | Red Bank | Port Hedland | |

== See also ==
- List of major roads in Perth, Western Australia
- List of highways in Western Australia
- List of road routes in Western Australia
- Major roads in the Gascoyne region of Western Australia
- Major roads in the Kimberley region of Western Australia
- Major roads in the Mid West region of Western Australia
- Major roads in the Pilbara region of Western Australia
- Major roads in the Wheatbelt region of Western Australia
