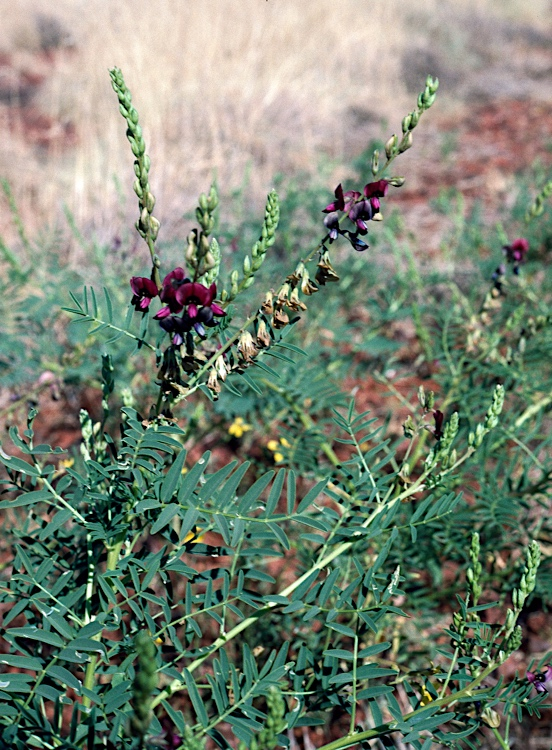
- Near Nanutarra

Scientific classification
- Kingdom: Plantae
- Clade: Tracheophytes
- Clade: Angiosperms
- Clade: Eudicots
- Clade: Rosids
- Order: Fabales
- Family: Fabaceae
- Subfamily: Faboideae
- Genus: Swainsona
- Species: S. laciniata

Binomial name
- Swainsona laciniata A.T.Lee

= Swainsona laciniata =

Species of legume

Swainsona laciniata is a species of flowering plant in the family Fabaceae and is endemic to north-western Australia. It is a prostrate or ascending perennial herb with imparipinnate leaves with 7 to 13 broadly elliptic to broadly egg-shaped leaflets, and racemes of 3 to 8 purple flowers.

== Description ==
Swainsona laciniata is a prostrate or ascending perennial herb that typically grows to a height of up to 15 cm (5.9 in) with many stems 1–2 mm (0.039–0.079 in) in diameter. Its leaves are imparipinnate, 10–70 mm (0.39–2.76 in) long with 7 to 13 broadly elliptic to broadly egg-shaped leaflets 2–9 mm (0.079–0.354 in) long and 2–4 mm (0.079–0.157 in) wide. There is a stipule up to about 10 mm (0.39 in) long at the base of the petiole. The flowers are arranged in racemes mostly 20–80 mm (0.79–3.15 in) long with 3 to 8 flowers on a peduncle 0.5–1 mm (0.020–0.039 in) wide, each flower 5–8 mm (0.20–0.31 in) long on a pedicel 1–2 mm (0.039–0.079 in) long. The sepals are joined at the base, forming a tube about 1.5–2 mm (0.059–0.079 in) long, the sepal lobes about the same length as the tube. The petals are purple, the standard petal 6–8 mm (0.24–0.31 in) long, the wings 4–6 mm (0.16–0.24 in) long, and the keel 3–7 mm (0.12–0.28 in) long and 3–4 mm (0.12–0.16 in) wide. Flowering occurs from July to September, and the fruit is a pod mostly 10–17 mm (0.39–0.67 in) long and 2.5–4 mm (0.098–0.157 in) wide with the remains of the style about 3 mm (0.12 in) long.

== Taxonomy and naming ==
Swainsona laciniata was first formally described in 1948 by Alma Theodora Lee in Contributions from the New South Wales National Herbarium, from specimens collected by Charles Gardner in 1927. The specific epithet (laciniata) means "laciniate", referring to the stipules.

== Distribution and habitat ==
This species of pea grows in silty, saline flats in the Central Ranges, Dampierland, Gascoyne, Little Sandy Desert and Murchison bioregions of Western Australia and the Central Ranges, Gascoyne and Great Sandy Desert of the Northern Territory.
