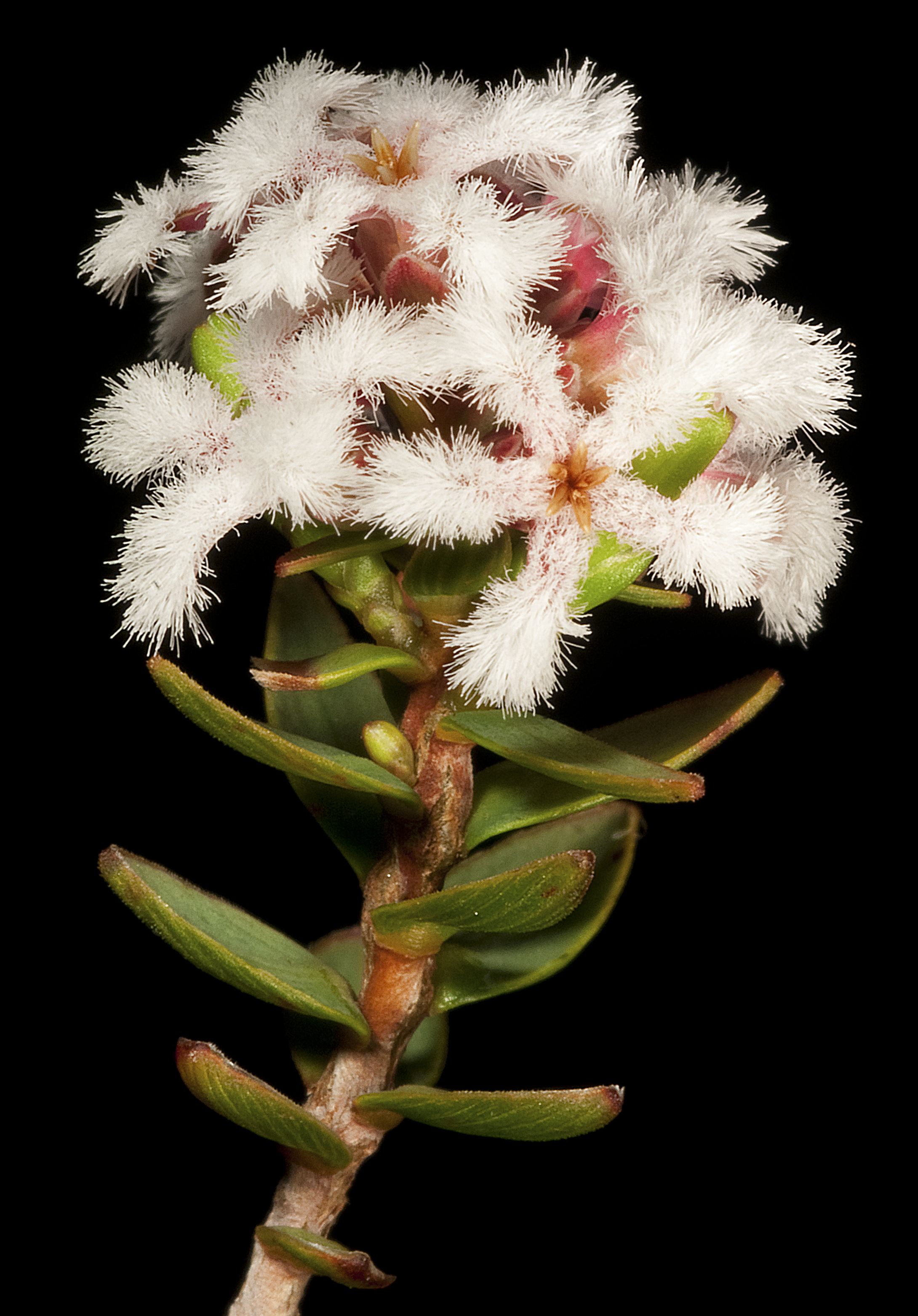

Scientific classification
- Kingdom: Plantae
- Clade: Tracheophytes
- Clade: Angiosperms
- Clade: Eudicots
- Clade: Asterids
- Order: Ericales
- Family: Ericaceae
- Genus: Leucopogon
- Species: L. polymorphus

Binomial name
- Leucopogon polymorphus Sond.
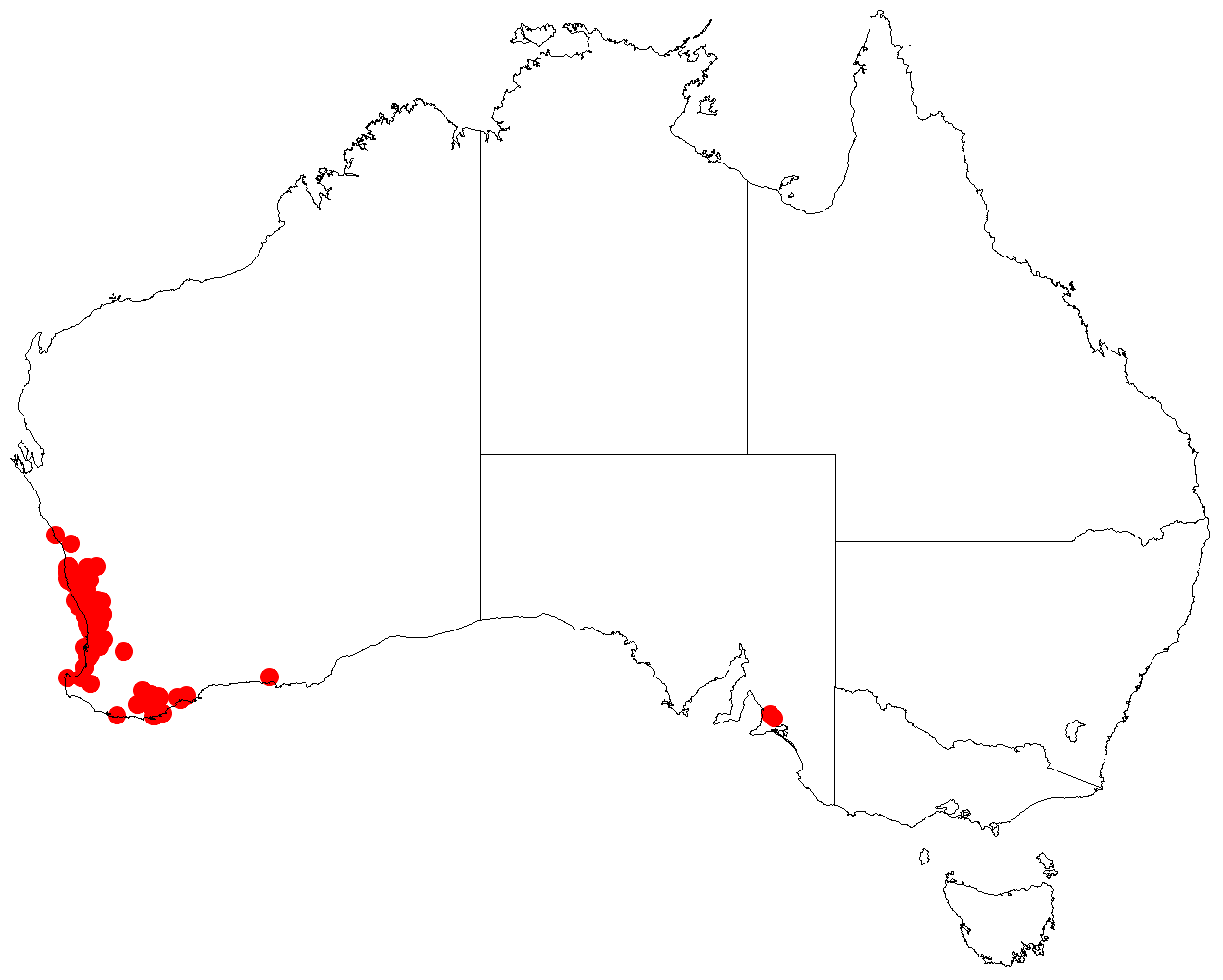
- Occurrence data from AVH

Synonyms
- Leucopogon sp. C Perth Flora (aff. polymorphus); Leucopogon sp. C. aff. polymorphus; Leucopogon sp. D Perth Flora (aff. polymorphus); Leucopogon sp. D. aff. polymorphus; Styphelia polymorpha (Sond.) F.Muell.

= Leucopogon polymorphus =

Species of shrub

Leucopogon polymorphus is a species of flowering plant in the heath family Ericaceae and is endemic to near-coastal areas of south-western Western Australia. It is a shrub with egg-shaped to lance-shaped or almost linear leaves and short, dense spines of white, tube-shaped flowers.

== Description ==
Leucopogon polymorphus is a shrub that typically grows to a height of 0.2–1 m (7.9 in – 3 ft 3.4 in) and sometimes has softly-hairy young branches. Its leaves are egg-shaped to narrowly lance-shaped or almost linear, 4–8.5 mm (0.16–0.33 in) long, concave and prominently ribbed on the lower side. The flowers are arranged on the ends of branches or in upper leaf axils in short, dense spikes with bracts and bracteoles less than half as long as the sepals. The sepals are about 2.6 mm (0.10 in) long and softly-hairy, the petals 4.2–5.3 mm (0.17–0.21 in) long and joined at the base, the petal lobes longer than the petal tube. Flowering occurs from June to October.

== Taxonomy ==
Leucopogon polymorphus was first formally described in 1845 by Otto Wilhelm Sonder in Lehmann's Plantae Preissianae. The specific epithet (polymorphus) means "many-shaped", referring to the variable habit of this species.

== Distribution and habitat ==
This leucopogon grows in sandy soil in near coastal areas from the Coolimba-Eneabba Road to Bunbury in the Geraldton Sandplains, Jarrah Forest and Swan Coastal Plain bioregions of south-western Western Australia.
