= Dampier Highway =

Highway in Western Australia

Dampier Highway Western Australia

General information
- Type: Highway
- Length: 19.3 km (12 mi)

Major junctions
- North end: Central Avenue; Dampier, Western Australia
- Burrup Road; Bayly Road (Karratha Airport); Exploration Drive; Madigan Road
- South end: De Witt Road; Karratha, Western Australia

Highway system
- Highways in Australia; National Highway • Freeways in Australia; Highways in Western Australia

Dampier Highway, formerly known as Karratha-Dampier Road, is a Western Australian highway linking Dampier on the state's north-western coast with the nearby regional centre of Karratha. The 19.3 kilometres (12 mi) long highway is also the primary thoroughfare for both communities to access the Karratha Airport, as well as industrial facilities including the Pluto LNG project and Murujuga National Park located on the Burrup Peninsula.

The road was completed in the late 1960s as a major link between Karratha and Dampier. While there is no direct connection to North West Coastal Highway, both De Witt Road and Madigan Road provide links between the two highways at Karratha.

Duplication of Dampier Highway between Balmoral Road West and Burrup Peninsula Road, turning it into a dual carriageway, was completed on 28 February 2013 by the Downer/Highway Construction/Albem Operations Joint Venture.

== See also ==
- Highways in Australia
- List of highways in Western Australia
