= Onslow Road =

Onslow Road may refer to:

- Onslow Road in Burwood Park, Surrey, United Kingdom
- Onslow Road (Western Australia)
