= Major roads in the Gascoyne region of Western Australia =

Main Roads Western Australia controls the major roads in the state's Gascoyne region. North West Coastal Highway, a north–south route near the coastline, is the main highway the region. A series of main roads connect coastal towns to the highway, and local roads provide additional links and access to the inland portion of the region. Roads are often named after the towns or areas they connect.

North West Coastal Highway and the main roads in the region are important for multiple aspects of the Gascoyne's economy. These include industrial activities, particularly gold and salt mining; defence purposes; freight movement, including livestock, as there is no deep-water port in the region; and tourist traffic travelling to National Parks, such as Cape Range, Kennedy Range and Mount Augustus, and the World Heritage sites of the Shark Bay and the Ningaloo Marine Park.

== Burkett Road ==
Burkett Road
- Location: Exmouth Gulf
- Length: 78.51 km (48.78 mi)

Burkett Road is a main east–west road in Exmouth Gulf near the northern edge of the Gascoyne. It links North West Coastal Highway with Minilya–Exmouth Road.

== Coral Bay Road ==
Coral Bay Road
- Location: Lyndon – Coral Bay
- Length: 12.42 km (7.72 mi)

Coral Bay Road is a main east–west road in the northern Gascoyne, connecting the coastal town of Coral Bay with Minilya–Exmouth Road in Lyndon.

== Minilya–Exmouth Road ==
Minilya–Exmouth Road
- Location: Minilya – Exmouth
- Length: 211.75 km (131.58 mi)

Minilya–Exmouth Road, also known as Minilya Exmouth Road, is a major north–south road in the northern Gascoyne. From North West Coastal Highway at Minilya, it travels north to Exmouth, and is the main access road to the North West Cape.

== Monkey Mia Road ==
Monkey Mia Road
- Location: Denham – Monkey Mia
- Length: 25.34 km (15.75 mi)
- Route number: Shark Bay Tourist Way (Tourist Drive 353)

Monkey Mia Road is a main road across Shark Bay's Peron Peninsula in the Gascoyne. From Denham on the west coast of the peninsula, it travels north-east, through the Francois Peron National Park, to Monkey Mia on the east coast. Monkey Mia road is part of the Shark Bay Tourist Way.

== North West Coastal Highway ==
North West Coastal Highway (Gascoyne region)
- Location: Nerren Nerren – Exmouth Gulf
- Length: 548.61 km (340.89 mi)
- Route number: National Route 1

North West Coastal Highway is the main north–south highway through the Gascoyne. It enters the southern edge of the region at Nerren Nerren, and travels north-west to Carnarvon. The highway continues north, parallel to but inland from the coastline, passing through Minilya. The highway leaves the Gascoyne at Exmouth Gulf, continuing north-east into the Pilbara region. The other major roads in the region are all connected to the highway, either directly or via another main road.

== Robinson Street ==
Robinson Street
- Location: Carnarvon
- Length: 5.09 km (3.16 mi)

Robinson Street is a major urban road in the Gascoyne town of Carnarvon. From the centre of town, it travels north-east to North West Coastal Highway at a T junction. It is the western leg of the intersection, with North West Coastal Highway forming the southern leg (towards Geraldton) and the eastern leg (towards Karratha).

== Shark Bay Road ==
Shark Bay Road
- Location: Hamelin Pool – Denham.
- Length: 128.18 km (79.65 mi)
- Route number: Shark Bay Tourist Way (Tourist Drive 353)

Shark Bay Road is a main road in the Gascoyne, providing access to the Shark Bay area. From the Overlander Roadhouse on North West Coastal Highway in Hamelin Pool, it travels west and then north-west up the Peron Peninsula to Denham. Shark Bay Road is part of the Shark Bay Tourist Way, and was previously named Denham Hamelin Road.

== See also ==
- List of highways in Western Australia
- List of road routes in Western Australia
- List of major roads in rural Western Australia
- Major roads in the Kimberley region of Western Australia
- Major roads in the Mid West region of Western Australia
- Major roads in the Pilbara region of Western Australia
- Major roads in the Wheatbelt region of Western Australia
- Tourist Drives in Western Australia
