= Major roads in the Wheatbelt region of Western Australia =

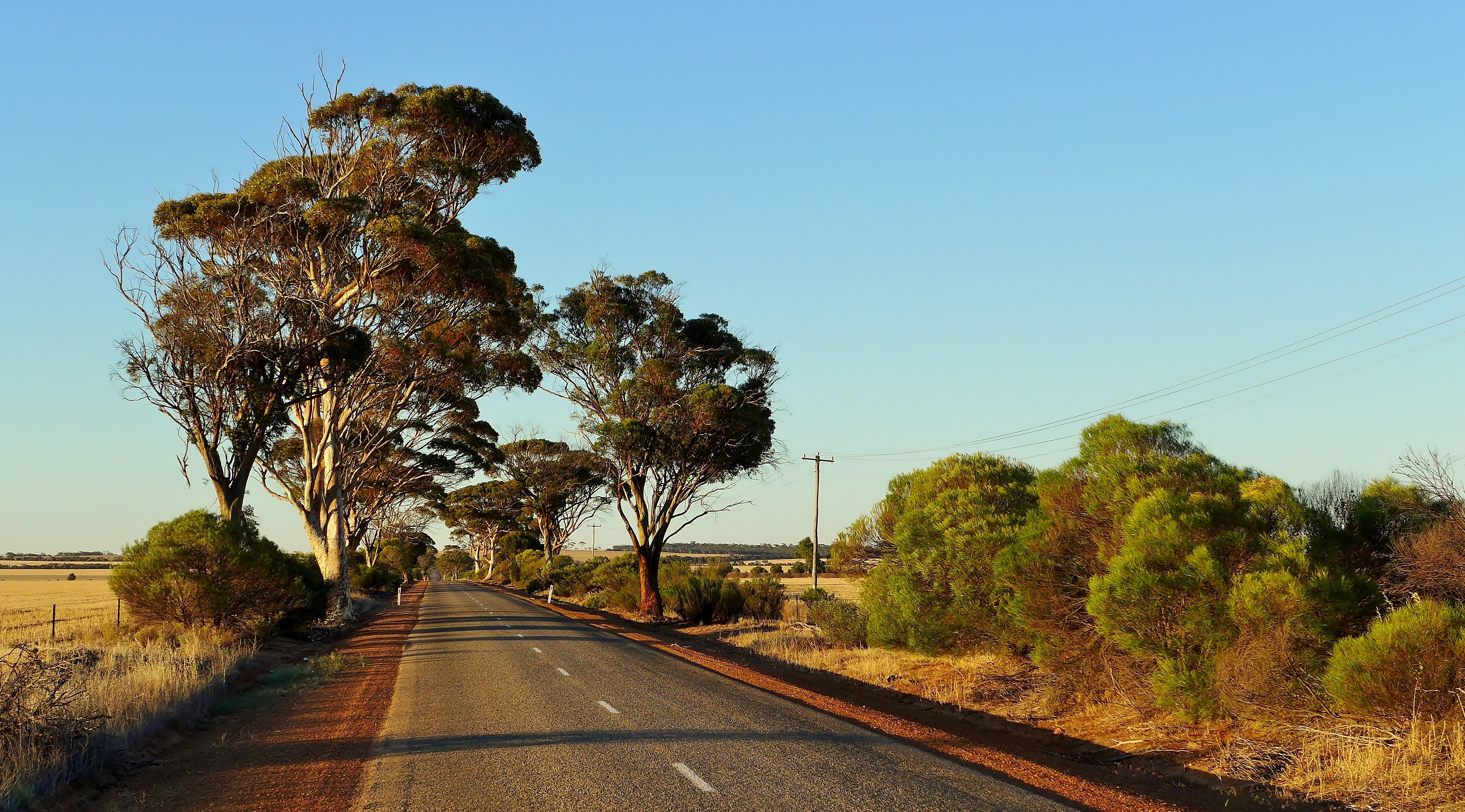
View of the Bruce Rock Merredin Road, 2014

Highways and main roads in the Wheatbelt region of Western Australia form the basis of a road network, which is primarily used by the mining, agriculture, and tourism industries. Main Roads Western Australia maintains and controls these major roads, with offices based in Northam and Narrogin.

Wheatbelt region, with highways highlighted in red

There are six main highways through the Wheatbelt that radiate out from Perth:

- Brand Highway (north-west to Geraldton)
- Great Northern Highway (north-east to Wyndham)
- Great Eastern Highway (east to Kalgoorlie)
- Great Southern Highway (east to York, then south to Cranbrook)
- Brookton Highway (east-south-east to Brookton)
- Albany Highway (south-east to Albany)

A network of main roads connects towns within the Wheatbelt to each other, the highways, and neighbouring regions, with local roads providing additional links and access to smaller townsites. Roads are often named after the towns they connect.

== Albany Highway ==
Albany Highway (Wheatbelt region)
- Location: Mount Cooke – Arthur River
- Length: 164.55 km (102.25 mi)
- Route number: State Route 30

Albany Highway is a main north-west to south-east highway in the southern Wheatbelt, close to or just outside the region's western edge. It passes through the towns of North Bannister, Crossman, Williams, and Arthur River.

== Arthur Road ==
Arthur Road
- Location: Arthur River – Wagin
- Length: 28.33 km (17.60 mi)
- Route number: State Route 107

Arthur Road is a major east–west road linking Arthur River and Wagin, near the southern edge of the Wheatbelt. The western terminus is at Albany Highway, and the eastern terminus is at Great Southern Highway. It is part of State Route 107, which continues west to Bunbury and east to Lake King.

== Bindoon Moora Road ==
Bindoon Moora Road
- Location: Bindoon – Moora
- Length: 84.06 km (52.23 mi)
- Route number: State Route 116

Bindoon Moora Road (also referred to as Bindoon–Moora Road or Moora Bindoon Road) is a major north–south road from Bindoon to Moora, in the northern Wheatbelt. The southern terminus is at Great Northern Highway north of the Bindoon townsite, and the northern terminus is at the outskirts of Moora, with the route continuing into the town centre as Padbury Street. It is the southern section of State Route 116, which continues north-west to Dongara.

== Brand Highway ==
Brand Highway (Wheatbelt region)
- Location: Muchea – Hill River
- Length: 180.88 km (112.39 mi)
- Route number: National Route 1

Brand Highway is a main north-west to south-east highway in the northern Wheatbelt, parallel to the coast. From Muchea, it travels in a north-westerly direction, passing to the west of Gingin, and through Cataby and Badgingarra. Shortly after the turnoff to Jurien Bay, it leaves the Wheatbelt region.

== Brookton Corrigin Road ==
Brookton Corrigin Road
- Location: Brookton – Corrigin
- Length: 90.65 km (56.33 mi)
- Route number: State Route 40

Brookton Corrigin Road is a major east–west road between Brookton and Corrigin in the Wheatbelt. It is part of State Route 40, which links south-eastern Perth to Ravensthorpe.

== Brookton Highway ==
Brookton Highway (Wheatbelt region)
- Location: Flynn – Brookton
- Length: 73.69 km (45.79 mi)
- Route number: State Route 40

Brookton Highway is a highway between the south-east of Perth and the Wheatbelt town of Brookton. It passes through Westdale on the way.

== Bruce Rock Merredin Road ==
Bruce Rock Merredin Road
- Location: Bruce Rock – Merredin
- Length: 47.10 km (29.27 mi)

Bruce Rock Merredin Road is a major north–south road between Bruce Rock and Merredin in the eastern Wheatbelt.

== Bruce Rock Quairading Road ==
Bruce Rock Quairading Road
- Location: Bruce Rock – Quairading
- Length: 75.37 km (46.83 mi)

Bruce Rock Quairading Road is a major east–west road between Bruce Rock in the east and Quairading in the west. It passes through Yoting and Kwolyin. It runs parallel to Great Eastern Highway, but further south.

== Bullfinch Road ==
Bullfinch Road
- Location: Southern Cross – Bullfinch
- Length: 33.74 km (20.97 mi)

Bullfinch Road is a major road in the eastern Wheatbelt, travelling in a north-westerly direction from Southern Cross to Bullfinch.

== Calingiri Road ==
Calingiri Road
- Location: Calingiri – Wannamal
- Length: 29.23 km (18.16 mi)

Calingiri Road is a major east–west road in the northern Wheatbelt, connecting Calingiri to Great Northern Highway, Wannamal.

== Calingiri Wongan Hills Road ==
Calingiri Wongan Hills Road
- Location: Calingiri – Wongan Hills
- Length: 38.19 km (23.73 mi)

Calingiri Wongan Hills Road is a major north-east to south-west road in the northern Wheatbelt, between Calingiri and Wongan Hills.

== Coalfields Road ==
Coalfields Road (Wheatbelt region)
- Location: Arthur River – Bowelling
- Length: 67.64 km (42.03 mi)
- Route number: State Route 107

Coalfields Road, also known as Coalfields Highway, is a major east–west road near the southern edge of the Wheatbelt. From Albany Highway, Arthur River, the road heads west via Darkan towards Collie in the state's South West region. It is part of State Route 107, which continues west to Bunbury and east to Lake King.

Main Roads Western Australia identifies the section west of Collie as H45 Coalfields Highway, and the rest as part of M37 Collie–Lake King Road.

== Collie Williams Road ==
Collie Williams Road (Wheatbelt region)
- Location: Williams
- Length: 37.59 km (23.36 mi)

Collie Williams Road is a major road near the south-western edge of the Wheatbelt. Starting at the Pinjarra Williams Road, west of the Williams townsite, the road heads in a south-westerly direction towards Collie, in the state's South West region.

== Corrigin Kondinin Road ==
Corrigin Kondinin Road
- Location: Corrigin – Kondinin
- Length: 46.65 km (28.99 mi)
- Route number: State Route 40

Corrigin Kondinin Road is a major road between the Wheatbelt towns of Corrigin and Kondinin. It is part of State Route 40, which links south-eastern Perth to Ravensthorpe.

== Corrigin Kulin Road ==
Corrigin Kulin Road
- Location: Gorge Rock – Kulin
- Length: 30.09 km (18.70 mi)

Corrigin Kulin Road is a major north–south road in the Wheatbelt. It is the southern section of the route between Corrigin and Kulin. The northern terminus is in Gorge Rock, at Corrigin Kondinin Road, which continues north-west to Corrigin.

== Dumbleyung Lake Grace Road ==
Dumbleyung Lake Grace Road
- Location: Dumbleyung – Lake Grace
- Length: 72.61 km (45.12 mi)
- Route number: State Route 107

Dumbleyung Lake Grace Road is a major east–west road linking Dumbleyung and Lake Grace, near the southern edge of the Wheatbelt. The road passes to the north of Kukerin near the halfway point. It is part of State Route 107, which continues west to Bunbury and east to Lake King.

== Goomalling Toodyay Road ==
Goomalling Toodyay Road
- Location: Goomalling – Toodyay
- Length: 46.94 km (29.17 mi)

Goomalling Toodyay Road is a major north-east to south-west road between Goomalling and Toodyay, in the northern Wheatbelt.

The Main Roads designation M60 Goomalling Toodyay Road also includes Railway Terrace and Lockyer Street in Goomalling.

== Goomalling Wyalkatchem Road ==
Goomalling Wyalkatchem Road
- Location: Goomalling – Wyalkatchem
- Length: 55.94 km (34.76 mi)

Goomalling Toodyay Road is a major east–west road in the northern Wheatbelt. It travels from Goomalling to Wyalkatchem via Dowerin, and was previously known as Goomalling Merredin Road.

== Great Eastern Highway ==
Great Eastern Highway (Wheatbelt region)
- Location: Wundowie – Boorabbin
- Length: 376.59 km (234.00 mi)
- Route number: National Highway 94

Great Eastern Highway is the main east–west highway through the centre of the Wheatbelt. From the eastern edge of Perth just past The Lakes, it heads east, bypassing Northam, and continuing through Merredin and Southern Cross towards the goldfields.

== Great Northern Highway ==
Great Northern Highway (Wheatbelt region)
- Location: Muchea – Jibberding
- Length: 277.52 km (172.44 mi)
- Route number: National Highway 95

Great Northern Highway is a main highway in the northern Wheatbelt, and part of the Perth to Darwin national highway. From the north-eastern edge of Perth, the highway travels north through Muchea, Bindoon, and New Norcia. It then heads generally north-easterly, to Dalwallinu, Wubin, and into the Midwest region beyond.

== Great Southern Highway ==
Great Southern Highway (Wheatbelt region)
- Location: The Lakes – Lime Lake
- Length: 277.52 km (172.44 mi)
- Route number: State Route 120

Great Southern Highway is a major north–south road in the southern Wheatbelt. From The Lakes at the eastern edge of Perth, the highway travels east to York, along a road previously known as Chidlow York Road. It then heads south through Beverley, Brookton, Narrogin, and Wagin.

== Hyden Lake King Road ==
Hyden Lake King Road
- Location: Hyden – Lake King
- Length: 123.58 km (76.79 mi)
- Route number: State Route 40

Hyden Lake King Road is a major road between the Wheatbelt towns of Hyden and Lake King. From Hyden, the road travels east past Wave Rock, and then south-east to Holt Rock, Varley, and Lake King. It is part of State Route 40, which links south-eastern Perth to Ravensthorpe.

== Indian Ocean Drive ==
Indian Ocean Drive (Wheatbelt region)
- Location: Wilbinga – Jurien Bay
- Length: 176 km (109 mi)
- Route number: State Route 60

Indian Ocean Drive is a main north-west to south-east coastal road in the northern Wheatbelt. From the intersection of Wanneroo Road and Yanchep Beach Road just sound of the boundary in Yanchep, it travels past turn-offs to Woodridge, Guilderton, Seabird, Ledge Point, and Lancelin. Further north it travels past The Pinnacles and Cervantes to Jurien Bay. North of Jurien Bay, it leaves the Wheatbelt region, heading towards Dongara in the state's Mid West region.

A December 2010 proposal to rename Wanneroo Road to Indian Ocean Drive, from Gingin Brook Road south to Yanchep Beach Road, was initially unsuccessful. However, a second attempt in 2011 was successful.

== Jurien Road ==
Jurien Road
- Location: Hill River – Jurien Bay
- Length: 35.52 km (22.07 mi)

Jurien Road, also known as Jurien East Road, is a major east–west road near the northern edge of the Wheatbelt, linking the coastal town of Jurien Bay with the Brand Highway at Hill River.

== Kondinin Hyden Road ==
Kondinin Hyden Road
- Location: Kondinin – Hyden
- Length: 58.51 km (36.36 mi)
- Route number: State Route 40

Kondinin Hyden Road is a major east–west road in the Wheatbelt, connecting Kondinin to Hyden via Karlgarin. It is part of State Route 40, which links south-eastern Perth to Ravensthorpe.

== Kulin Lake Grace Road ==
Kulin Lake Grace Road
- Location: Kulin – Lake Grace
- Length: 70.74 km (43.96 mi)

Kulin Lake Grace Road is a major road between Kulin and Lake Grace in the Wheatbelt.

== Lake Grace Newdegate Road ==
Lake Grace Newdegate Road
- Location: Lake Grace – Newdegate
- Length: 50.32 km (31.27 mi)
- Route number: State Route 107

Lake Grace Newdegate Road is a major east–west road linking Lake Grace and Newdegate, near the southern edge of the Wheatbelt. It is part of State Route 107, which continues west to Bunbury and east to Lake King.

== Merredin–Nungarin Road ==
Merredin–Nungarin Road
- Location: Merredin – Nungarin
- Length: 36.70 km (22.80 mi)

Merredin–Nungarin Road, also known as Merredin Nungarin Road or Nungarin Merredin Road, is a major north–south road in the eastern Wheatbelt. It travels from Merredin to Nungarin, and was previously known as Goomalling Merredin Road.

== Midlands Road ==
Midlands Road (Wheatbelt region)
- Location: Walebing – Watheroo
- Length: 77.08 km (47.90 mi)
- Route number: State Route 116

Midlands Road, also known as The Midlands Road, is a major road in the northern Wheatbelt. From Great Northern Highway at Walebing, the road travels west to Moora and then north to Watheroo. Beyond Watheroo, it continues north into the state's Mid West region. The section from Moora northwards is part of State Route 116, which continues south to Bindoon and north-west to Dongara.

== Mullewa–Wubin Road ==
Mullewa–Wubin Road (Wheatbelt region)
- Location: Wubin – Buntine
- Length: 27.10 km (16.84 mi)

Mullewa–Wubin Road, also known as Mullewa Wubin Road, is a major road near the northern edge of the Wheatbelt. From Great Northern Highway at Wubin, the road heads north-west into the state's Mid West region, towards Latham, Perenjori, Morawa, and Mullewa.

== Newdegate Ravensthorpe Road ==
Newdegate Ravensthorpe Road (Wheatbelt region)
- Location: Newdegate – Mount Madden
- Length: 122.99 km (76.42 mi)
- Route number: State Route 40 (Lake King–Ravensthorpe); State Route 107 (Newdegate–Lake King)

Newdegate Ravensthorpe Road is a major road near the southern edge of the Wheatbelt. From Newdegate, it travels east to Lake King, and then south towards Ravensthorpe, in the state's Great Southern region. The east–west section is part of State Route 107, which continues west to Bunbury, while the north–south section is part of State Route 40, which links south-eastern Perth to Ravensthorpe.

== Northam York Road ==
Northam York Road
- Location: Northam – York
- Length: 30.79 km (19.13 mi)
- Route number: State Route 120

Northam York Road, also known as Northam–York Road, is a major north–south road in the central Wheatbelt, linking Northam and York, with the southern half of the route running alongside the Avon River. It is part of State Route 120, which continues north to Toodyay and south to Cranbrook.

== Northam–Pithara Road ==
Northam–Pithara Road
- Location: Northam – Pithara
- Length: 149.02 km (92.60 mi)
- Route number: State Route 115

Northam–Pithara Road, also known as Northam Pithara Road, is a major north–south road in the northern Wheatbelt. The road links Great Eastern Highway at Northam with Great Northern Highway at Pithara. Along the way, it travels through the towns of Goomalling, Wongan Hills, and Ballidu. It forms the majority of State Route 115, which continues south into the centre of Northam along Goomalling Road and Taylor Street.

== Northam–Toodyay Road ==
Northam–Toodyay Road
- Location: Northam – Toodyay
- Length: 21.05 km (13.08 mi)
- Route number: State Route 120

Northam–Toodyay Road, also known as Northam Toodyay Road, is a major north-west to south-east road in the central Wheatbelt, linking Great Eastern Highway, Northam with Toodyay Road in Toodyay. It is the northern section of State Route 120, which continues south-east through Northam along Newcastle Road, Fitzgerald Street, and Peel Terrace. Beyond Northam, State Route 120 travels south to Cranbrook via York and other towns on the Great Southern Highway.

== Nungarin–Wyalkatchem Road ==
Nungarin–Wyalkatchem Road
- Location: Nungarin – Wyalkatchem
- Length: 74.89 km (46.53 mi)

Nungarin–Wyalkatchem Road, also known as Nungarin Wyalkatchem Road or Wyalkatchem Nungarin Road, is a major east–west road in the northern Wheatbelt. It travels from Nungarin to Wyalkatchem via Kununoppin and Trayning. It was previously known as Goomalling Merredin Road.

== Peel Terrace ==
Peel Terrace
- Location: Northam
- Length: 1.66 km (1.03 mi)
- Route number: State Route 120

Peel Terrace is a major road within Northam, Western Australia. It starts as the continuation of Forrest Road at the Avon River. It crosses the river near the Northam Weir, and travels in an east-south-easterly direction. The first major intersection is with Fitzgerald Street and Taylor Street, which is controlled by traffic lights. It continues in a straight line, alongside the railway line, until it intersect Yilgarn Avenue and York Road. Yilgarn Avenue leads to Great Eastern Highway, while York Road continues south to Northam York Road.

South-east of Fitzgerald Street, the road is part of State Route 120, which links Toodyay in the north with Cranbrook in the south. The route continues through Northam along Fitzgerald Street and Newcastle Road northbound, towards Northam–Toodyay_Road, and along York Road to Northam York Road.

Main Roads Western Australia controls the section south-east of Fitzgerald Street, which was part Great Eastern Highway's former route, prior to the construction of the Northam bypass. The highway formerly continued east along Yilgarn Avenue, and west along Fitzgerald Street, Newcastle Road, and Mitchell Avenue.

== Pingrup Lake Grace Road ==
Pingrup Lake Grace Road (Wheatbelt region)
- Location: Lake Grace – South Lake Grace
- Length: 27.46 km (17.06 mi)

Pingrup Lake Grace Road is a major road near the southern edge of the Wheatbelt. Starting at the Lake Grace, the road heads south towards Pingrup, in the state's Great Southern region.

== Pinjarra Williams Road ==
Pinjarra Williams Road (Wheatbelt region)
- Location: Williams – Quindanning
- Length: 33.58 km (20.87 mi)

Pinjarra Williams Road is a major road near the south-western edge of the Wheatbelt. Starting from Albany Highway at Williams, the road heads west to Quindanning, and then continues in a north-westerly direction into the state's Peel region, towards Pinjarra.

== Quairading–York Road ==
Quairading–York Road
- Location: Quairading – York
- Length: 65.62 km (40.77 mi)

Quairading–York Road, also known as Quairading York Road, is a major east–west road in the central Wheatbelt. It travels between Quairading and York, via Mawson.

== Southern Cross–Marvel Loch Road ==
Southern Cross–Marvel Lock Road
- Location: Southern Cross – Marvel Loch
- Length: 31.74 km (19.72 mi)

Southern Cross–Marvel Loch Road, also known as Southern Cross Marvel Loch Road, is a major road in the eastern Wheatbelt. From Great Eastern Highway at Southern Cross, it travels in a south-easterly direction to Marvel Loch.

== Toodyay Road ==
Toodyay Road (Wheatbelt region)
- Location: Morangup – Toodyay
- Length: 27.71 km (17.22 mi)
- Route number: State Route 50

Toodyay Road is a major road from Perth into the northern Wheatbelt. From Morangup, just outside Perth's north-eastern edge, the road travels in a north-easterly direction to Toodyay. It is allocated State Route 50.

== Tonkin Highway ==
Tonkin Highway (Wheatbelt region)
- Location: Muchea
- Length: 7.1 km (4.4 mi)
- Route number: State Route 4

Tonkin Highway provides the lone freeway-standard road in the region, connecting Perth to both Brand Highway and Great Northern Highway. It travels from just outside Perth's north-eastern edge to Muchea. It is allocated State Route 4.

== Wagin Dumbleyung Road ==
Wagin Dumbleyung Road
- Location: Wagin – Dumbleyung
- Length: 36.19 km (22.49 mi)
- Route number: State Route 107

Wagin Dumbleyung Road is a major east–west road linking Wagin and Dumbleyung, near the southern edge of the Wheatbelt. It is part of State Route 107, which continues west to Bunbury and east to Lake King.

== Williams Kondinin Road ==
Williams Kondinin Road
- Location: Williams – Kondinin
- Length: 161.89 km (100.59 mi)
- Route number: State Route 40

Williams Kondinin Road is a major road between the Wheatbelt towns of Williams and Kondinin. From Williams, the road travels north-east to Narrogin and Wickepin, then east to Jitarning. It continues north-east to Kondinin, via Kulin.

== See also ==
- List of highways in Western Australia
- List of major roads in rural Western Australia
- List of road routes in Western Australia
- Major roads in the Gascoyne region of Western Australia
- Major roads in the Kimberley region of Western Australia
- Major roads in the Mid West region of Western Australia
- Major roads in the Pilbara region of Western Australia
- Tourist Drives in Western Australia
