= Major roads in the Pilbara region of Western Australia =

Main Roads Western Australia controls the major roads in the state's Pilbara region. There are two main highways in the region: Great Northern Highway, which travels north through the region to Port Hedland and then north-west along the coast, as well as North West Coastal Highway, which heads south-west from Port Hedland. A series of main roads connects towns to the highways, and local roads provide additional links. The majority of these roads service the western half of the region, with few located in the various deserts east of the Oakover River. Roads are often named after the towns or areas they connect.

The region's main roads are important for multiple aspects of the Pilbara's economy. These activities include mining (despite most products being transported by rail), agriculture and pastoral leases, and tourism, especially to the national parks at Karijini, Millstream-Chichester, and Rudall River.

== Bingarn Road ==
Bingarn Road
- Location: Tom Price
- Length: 0.9 km (0.56 mi; 3,000 ft)

Bingarn Road is the main access road connecting Tom Price to the wider Pilbara region since 2020. It commences at the intersection of Manuwarra Red Dog Highway and Paraburdoo–Tom Price Road and terminates at the intersection of Willow and Central Roads in central Tom Price. It was originally known as Mine Road prior to the naming of the Manuwarra Red Dog Highway replacing the original Bingarn Road alignment. The original Bingarn Road was a major north–south road in the Pilbara connecting Tom Price north to Nanutarra Munjina Road at Mount Sheila.

== Burrup Road ==
Burrup Road
- Location: Burrup Peninsula
- Length: 9.25 km (5.75 mi)

Burrup Road, also known as Burrup Peninsula Road, is a main road on the Burrup Peninsula. From Dampier Road near Dampier, it heads north-east up the peninsula to Woodside's onshore LNG processing plant.

== Dampier Road ==
Dampier Road
- Location: Karratha – Dampier
- Length: 19.27 km (11.97 mi)

Dampier Road, also known as Dampier Highway, is a major road in the Pilbara. From De Witt Road in Karratha, it travels west along the southern edge of town, and continues west to Gap Ridge. It then turns north-westerly, running to Dampier on the Burrup Peninsula.

The road was completed in the late 1960s as a major link between Karratha and Dampier.

Duplication between Balmoral Road West and Burrup Peninsula Road, turning the road into a dual carriageway, was completed on 28 February 2013.

== Great Northern Highway ==
Great Northern Highway (Pilbara region)
- Location: Newman – Pardoo
- Length: 609.34 km (378.63 mi)
- Route number: National Highway 95; National Highway 1

Great Northern Highway is a main highway through the Pilbara region, and part of the Perth to Darwin national highway. From the southern edge of the region at Newman, the highway travels north-west towards Karijini National Park, and then north to Port Hedland, where it meets the northern end of North West Coastal Highway. Great Northern Highway continues north-eastwards near the coast, passing into the Kimberley region at Pardoo.

== De Witt Road ==
De Witt Road
- Location: Karratha
- Length: 6.57 km (4.08 mi)

De Witt Road (formerly Karratha Rd) is a main north–south road in the Pilbara region, linking Karratha to the North West Coastal Highway. It travels from the highway to the town centre along the eastern edge of Stove Hill, terminating at Dampier Road.

== Karijini Drive ==
Karijini Drive
- Location: Juna Downs – Mount Sheila
- Length: 108.66 km (67.52 mi)
- Route number: State Route 142

Karijini Drive, also known as Karijini Road, is a major east–west road through the Karijini National Park. It connects Great Northern Highway, on the eastern side of the park, to Mount Sheila, near Tom Price, west of the park.

== Madigan Road ==
Madigan Road
- Location: Karratha
- Length: 5.78 km (3.59 mi)

Madigan Road is a major north–south road in the Pilbara region. It runs north from the Karratha Roadhouse on North West Coastal Highway, linking traffic to Dampier and Karratha via Dampier Road.

== Manuwarra Red Dog Highway ==
Manuwarra Red Dog Highway
- Location: Karratha – Tom Price
- Length: 275.26 km (171.04 mi)
- Route number: State Route 142

Manuwarra Red Dog Highway is a major north-west to south-east road in the Pilbara region currently being constructed between Karratha and Tom Price. Originally known as Karratha-Tom Price Road, it acquired its new name in September 2020 after community consultation. Manuwarra means "heaps" in the Yindjibarndi language and is the indigenous name for the Red Dog Gorge in the Millstream Chichester National Park. Both the gorge and the highway acquired its English name from the eponymous Red Dog, a famous Kelpie/Cattle Dog and Pilbara mascot from the 1970s.

The road is constructed from renamed sections of Warlu Road, Roebourne-Wittenoom Road and Bingarn Road along with a portion of the service road originally constructed to service the Hamersley & Robe River railway.

== Marble Bar Road ==
Marble Bar Road
- Location: Newman – Strelley
- Length: 433.94 km (269.64 mi)
- Route number: State Route 138

Marble Bar Road is a main north–south road in the Pilbara region. From Great Northern Highway at Newman, it heads north via Nullagine and Marble Bar to rejoin Great Northern Highway at Strelley, east of Port Hedland. Although it provides an alternative route to Great Northern Highway, most of the Newman to Marble Bar section is unsealed. Despite having been promised to be sealed since the 1950s after the clousure of the Marble Bar railway line.

The Northern Australia Roads Program announced in 2016 included the a realignment and reconstruction works at Coonan Gorge that was completed in 2019 at a total cost of $34.5 million.

== Nanutarra Munjina Road ==
Nanutarra Munjina Road
- Location: Nanutarra – Karijini
- Length: 417.12 km (259.19 mi)
- Route number: State Route 136

Nanutarra Munjina Road is a major east–west road in the Pilbara region. From North West Coastal Highway at the Nanutarra Roadhouse, it travels east-south-east towards Paraburdoo–Tom Price Road. The sealed road turns here towards Paraburdoo, but Nanutarra Munjina Road continues as an unsealed road for most of its remaining length, passing the ghost town of Wittenoom. It curves to the north-east, heading around Tom Price and the Karijini National Park. Near the Fortescue River, the road again travels east-south-easterly to Great Northern Highway at the Auski Roadhouse, Karijini.

== North West Coastal Highway ==
North West Coastal Highway (Pilbara region)
- Location: Yannarie – Mundabullangana
- Length: 570.26 km (354.34 mi)
- Route number: National Route 1

North West Coastal Highway is a highway that follows the southern half of the Pilbara coastline. From the Gascyone region at Burkett Road, a turnoff for Exmouth, the highway enters the Pilbara region at Yannarie. It heads north-easterly, gradually moving closer to the coast until it reaches the access roads to Dampier and Karratha, Madigan Road and Karratha Road. From here the highway moves runs to Roebourne and then over to Whim Creek, where it curves back to the north east to meet Great Northern Highway at Mundabullangana, south of Port Hedland.

== Onslow Road ==
Onslow Road
- Location: Cane – Onslow
- Length: 79.40 km (49.34 mi)

Onslow Road is a major road in the Pilbara region. From North West Coastal Highway at Cane, north of the Nanutarra Roadhouse, it heads north-west to the town of Onslow on the coast.

== Paraburdoo–Tom Price Road ==
Paraburdoo–Tom Price Road
- Location: Rocklea – Tom Price
- Length: 130.78 km (81.26 mi)
- Route number: State Route 136 (south of Karijini Drive) State Route 142 (west of Karijini Drive)

Paraburdoo–Tom Price Road, also known as Paraburdoo Tom Price Road or Paraburdoo Road (west of Paraburdoo) and Tom Price Road (east of Paraburdoo), is a major road in the Pilbara region. From Nanutarra Munjina Road in Rocklea, the road heads south-east to Paraburdoo. It then curves round to the north, meeting Karijini Road, before heading a short distance north-west to Tom Price, where Manuwarra Red Dog Highway completes the loop back to Nanutarra Munjina Road. Paraburdoo–Tom Price Road is part of the sealed road link between North West Coastal Highway and Great Northern Highway in the southern half of the Pilbara.

== Point Samson–Roebourne Road ==
Point Samson–Roebourne Road
- Location: Point Samson – Roebourne
- Length: 18.41 km (11.44 mi)

Point Samson–Roebourne Road, also known as Point Samson Roebourne Road, is a major north–south road in the Pilbara region. It links Point Samson on the coast via Wickham to North West Coastal Highway at Roebourne.

== Ripon Hills Road ==
Ripon Hills Road
- Location: Marble Bar
- Length: 130.94 km (81.36 mi)

Ripon Hills Road is a major east–west road in Marble Bar. It travels from Marble Bar Road near the Marble Bar townsite to the Telfer Mine Road turnoff, near the Oakover River, which provides access to Telfer. After the turnoff, Ripon Hills Road continues as Woodie Woodie Road to the Nifty and Woodie Woodie mine sites.

Ripon Hills Road was opened in November 1999 to replace the unsealed Woodie Woodie Road between Marble Bar townsite and the Telfer Mine Road turnoff as the main road through the region. At the time Ripon Hills Road was opened, Woodie Woodie Road carried over 500,000 tonnes of freight.

== Wilson Street ==
Wilson Street
- Location: Port Hedland
- Length: 10.38 km (6.45 mi)

Wilson Street is a major road in Port Hedland, in the Pilbara region. It connects the coastal townsite to Great Northern Highway.

== See also ==
- List of highways in Western Australia
- List of road routes in Western Australia
- List of major roads in rural Western Australia
- Major roads in the Gascoyne region of Western Australia
- Major roads in the Kimberley region of Western Australia
- Major roads in the Mid West region of Western Australia
- Major roads in the Wheatbelt region of Western Australia
- Tourist Drives in Western Australia
