= List of highways in Western Australia =

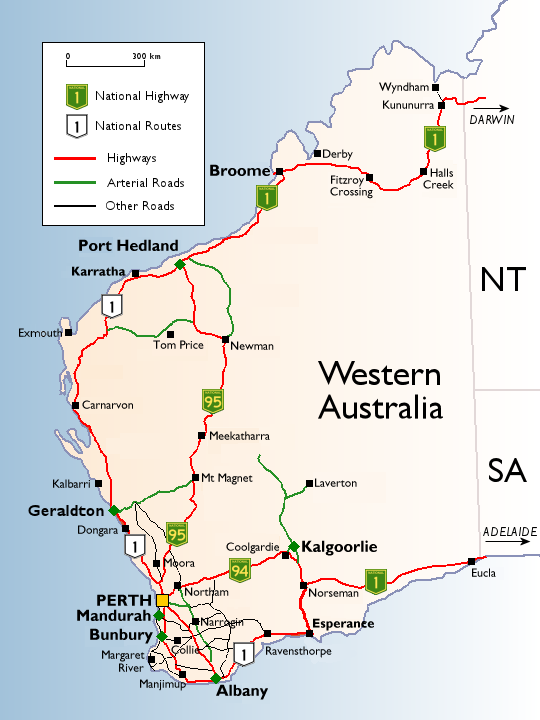
General highways of Western Australia

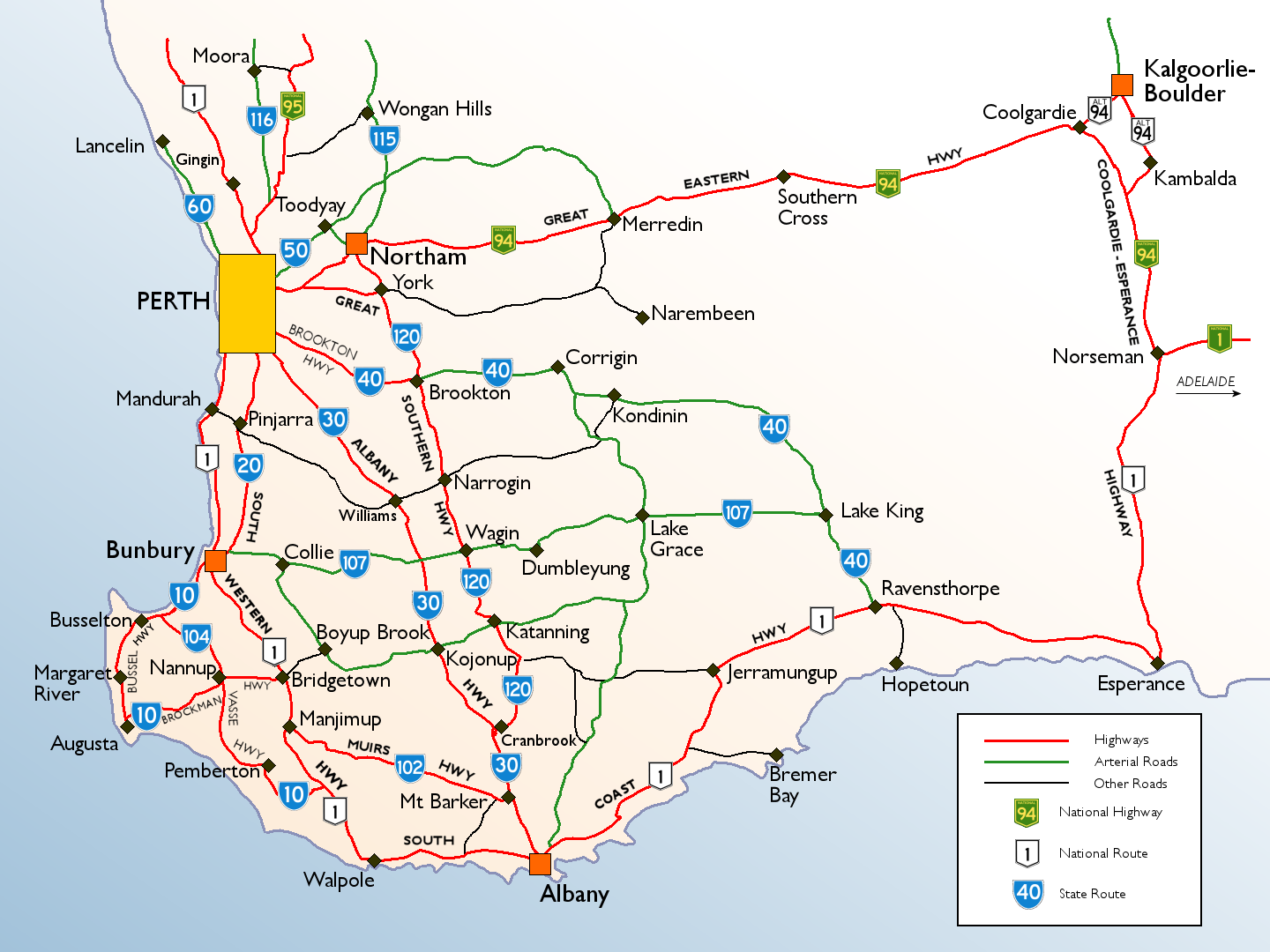
South Western Australia roads in detail

Highways in Western Australia include both roads that are named as a highway, and roads that have been declared as a highway under the Main Roads Act 1930. The standard of highways range from two-lane roads, common in rural areas, to controlled access, grade separated freeways in Perth.

In legislation, a highway is a type of road controlled and maintained by the state road authority, Main Roads Western Australia. Any road or section of road may be proclaimed a highway by the Governor of Western Australia, on the recommendation of the Commissioner of Main Roads, under Section 13 of the Main Roads Act 1930. Section 14 of the act allows for the creation of new highways. Main Roads assigns each highway a name and number, which may vary from the official road names used on road signs and by the general public. The highway number does not correspond to a road route that may be allocated to the highway, and some highways are not part of a numbered route.

== Proclaimed highways ==
No	Highway	Component roads	From	To	Length (km)	Length (mi)	Notes
H1	Albany Highway	The Causeway; Shepperton Road; Albany Highway	Perth	Albany	403.71	250.85	
H2	Melville Mandurah Highway	Stock Road; Rockingham Road; Ennis Avenue; Mandurah Road; Old Coast Road	Bicton Attadale	Mandurah	56.04	34.82	Formerly Perth–Bunbury Highway which extended down to Bunbury. Also is more of a residential road in Bicton, Attadale, Melville, and Palmyra.
H3	Eyre Highway	Eyre Highway	Norseman	Ceduna (SA)	720.71	447.83	
H4	Brand Highway	Brand Highway	Muchea	Geraldton	367.62	228.43	
H5	Great Eastern Highway	Great Eastern Highway; Johnson Street (Guildford); James Street (Guildford); East Street (Guildford); Hannan Street (Kalgoorlie)	Burswood	Kalgoorlie	592.65	368.26	
H6	Great Northern Highway	Great Northern Highway	Midland	Wyndham	3,193.31	1,984.23	
H7	North West Coastal Highway	North West Coastal Highway	Geraldton	Port Hedland	1,294.87	804.59	
H8	South Coast Highway	South Coast Highway; Chester Pass Road (Albany); Morgans Street (Ravensthorpe)	Albany	Esperance	474.38	294.77	
H9	South Western Highway	South Western Highway	Armadale	Walpole	513.57	319.12	
H10	Coolgardie–Esperance Highway	Coolgardie–Esperance Highway; Harbour Road (Esperance)	Coolgardie	Esperance	370.74	230.37	
H11	Victoria Highway	Victoria Highway	Lake Argyle	Katherine (NT)	87.51	54.38	
H12	Leach Highway	Leach Highway	Palmyra	Kewdale	22.35	13.89	
H13	Canning Highway	Canning Highway	Fremantle	Victoria Park	16.06	9.98	
H14	Stirling Highway	Stirling Highway	Crawley	Fremantle	15.78	9.81	
H15	Kwinana Freeway	Kwinana Freeway	Perth	Lake Clifton	71.55	44.46	
H16	Mitchell Freeway	Mitchell Freeway	Perth	Clarkson	36.00	22.37	
H17	Tonkin Highway	Tonkin Highway	Muchea	Oakford	80.70	50.14	
H18	Roe Highway	Roe Highway	Middle Swan	Bibra Lake	34.88	21.67	
H19	Great Eastern Highway Bypass	Great Eastern Highway Bypass	South Guildford	Hazelmere	5.58	3.47	
H20	Graham Farmer Freeway	Graham Farmer Freeway	West Perth	Rivervale	6.84	4.25	
H21	Reid Highway	Reid Highway	North Beach	Middle Swan	23.82	14.80	
H22	Wimbledon–Rupert Street Link	Kenwick Link	Beckenham	Kenwick	3.29	2.04	
H23	Armadale Road	Armadale Road	Armadale	Cockburn Central	15.96	9.92	
H24	Brearley Avenue	Brearley Avenue	Redcliffe	Perth Airport	0.85	0.53	Closed in 2018 to allow construction of the new Airport Line.
H25	Cockburn Road	Cockburn Road	Hamilton Hill	Henderson	10.02	6.23	
H26	Guildford Road	Guildford Road	Mount Lawley	Guildford	11.01	6.84	
H27	Rivervale–Wattle Grove Link	Orrong Road, Welshpool Road East	Rivervale	Wattle Grove	10.16	6.31	
H28	Karrinyup–Morley Highway	Karrinyup Road, Morley Drive	Karrinyup	Bassendean	15.13	9.40	
H29	Marmion Avenue	Marmion Avenue	Karrinyup	Mullaloo	12.20	7.58	
H30	Port Beach Road	Port Beach Road; Walter Place; Curtin Avenue	North Fremantle		2.64	1.64	
H31	Queen Victoria Street	Queen Victoria Street	North Fremantle	Fremantle	0.88	0.55	
H32	South Street	South Street	Canning Vale	Fremantle	12.48	7.75	
H33	Toodyay Road	Toodyay Road	Middle Swan	Toodyay	22.07	13.71	
H34	Tydeman Road	Tydeman Road	North Fremantle		1.04	0.65	
H35	Wanneroo Road	Wanneroo Road	Joondanna	Yanchep	43.60	27.09	
H36	West Coast Highway	Curtin Avenue (north of Grant Street); West Coast Highway	Cottesloe	Trigg	13.47	8.37	
H37	Garratt Road Bridge	Garratt Road	Bayswater	Ascot	0.24	0.15	
H38	Thomas Road	Thomas Road	Kwinana Beach	Oakford	18.50	11.50	
H39	Stephenson Highway	Stephenson Avenue	Osborne Park		0.62	0.39	
H40	Albany Port Road	Hanrahan Road; Princess Royal Drive	Albany		7.29	4.53	
H41	Anzac Drive	Anzac Drive	West Kalgoorlie	South Boulder	7.04	4.37	
H42	Broome Highway	Broome Road	Roebuck	Broome	41.03	25.49	
H43	Bussell Highway	Bussell Highway; Robertson Drive	Bunbury	Augusta	139.71	86.81	
H44	Carnarvon Road	Robinson Street	Kingsford	Carnarvon	5.09	3.16	
H45	Coalfields Highway	Coalfields Highway	Roelands	Arthur River	36.22	22.51	
H46	Dampier Road	Dampier Highway; Karratha Road	Stove Hill	Dampier	25.84	16.06	
H47	Derby Highway	Derby Highway	Willare	Derby	42.86	26.63	
H48	Minilya–Exmouth Road	Minilya–Exmouth Road	Minilya	Exmouth	211.75	131.58	
H49	Goldfields Highway	Goldfields Highway	Meekatharra	Kambalda	788.13	489.72	
H50	Geraldton–Mount Magnet Road	Geraldton–Mount Magnet Road	Geraldton	Mount Magnet	335.34	208.37	
H51	Port Hedland Road	Wilson Street	Port Hedland		10.38	6.45	
H52	Brookton Highway	Brookton Highway; Brookton–Corrigin Road; Corrigin–Kondinin Road; Kondinin–Hyden Road; Hyden–Lake King Road; Newdegate–Ravensthorpe Road	Armadale	Ravensthorpe	501.07	311.35	
H53	Williams–Narrogin Highway	Williams–Kondinin Road	Williams	Narrogin	31.45	19.54	
H54	Albany Ring Road	Menang Drive	Willyung		6.66	4.14	
H55	Madigan Road	Madigan Road	Gap Ridge		5.78	3.59	
H56	Beach Street (Victoria Quay Access)	Beach Street	Fremantle		0.27	0.17	Queen Victoria Street to Victoria Quay access point
H57	Forrest Highway	Forrest Highway	Ravenswood	Bunbury	95.67	59.45	
H59	Willinge Drive	Willinge Drive; Estuary Drive	Vittoria	Picton	4.86	3.02	
H61	Australind–Roelands Link	Raymond Road	Australind	Roelands	6.70	4.16	
H62	John Willcock Link	John Willcock Link	Geraldton		4.20	2.61	
H65	Horrie Miller Drive	Horrie Miller Drive	Kewdale	Perth Airport	0.22	0.14	

== Main roads with highway names ==
A "main road" is another type of road controlled by Main Roads Western Australia.

No	Highway	From	To	Notes
M8	Vasse Highway	Busselton	Diamond Tree	
M10	Chidlow–York Road	Chidlow	York	Official road name is Great Southern Highway
M24	Muir Highway	Manjimup	Mount Barker	
M27	Brockman Highway	Karridale	Bridgetown	
M31	Northam–Cranbrook Road	Northam	Cranbrook	Official name is Great Southern Highway, from York to Cranbrook
M65	Manuwarra Red Dog Highway	Karratha	Tom Price	

== Outback tracks with highway names ==
As the outback covers most of Western Australia, tracks provide vital links to remote communities and settlements. These tracks are unsealed, remote, and in many cases pass through restricted areas such as Aboriginal lands and Indigenous Protected Areas, which require transit permits.

- Anne Beadell Highway
- Connie Sue Highway
- Eagle Highway
- Gary Highway
- Gunbarrel Highway
- Heather Highway
- Buntine Highway

== Road routes with highway names ==
Highway 1 is a route that circumnavigates Australia, joining all mainland state capitals, via roads numbered 1, M1, A1, or B1, as some states use an alphanumeric route numbering system. In Western Australia, most of the highway is designated as National Route 1. However, the sections in the north-east and south-east of the state that are concurrent with the National Highway routes from Perth to Adelaide and from Perth to Darwin are designated as National Highway 1.

== See also ==
- Highways in Australia for highways in other states and territories
- List of highways in Australia for roads named as highways, but not necessarily classified as highways
- List of roadhouses in Western Australia
- List of road routes in Western Australia
