= Coral Bay, Western Australia =

Town in Western Australia

Coral Bay
- Town
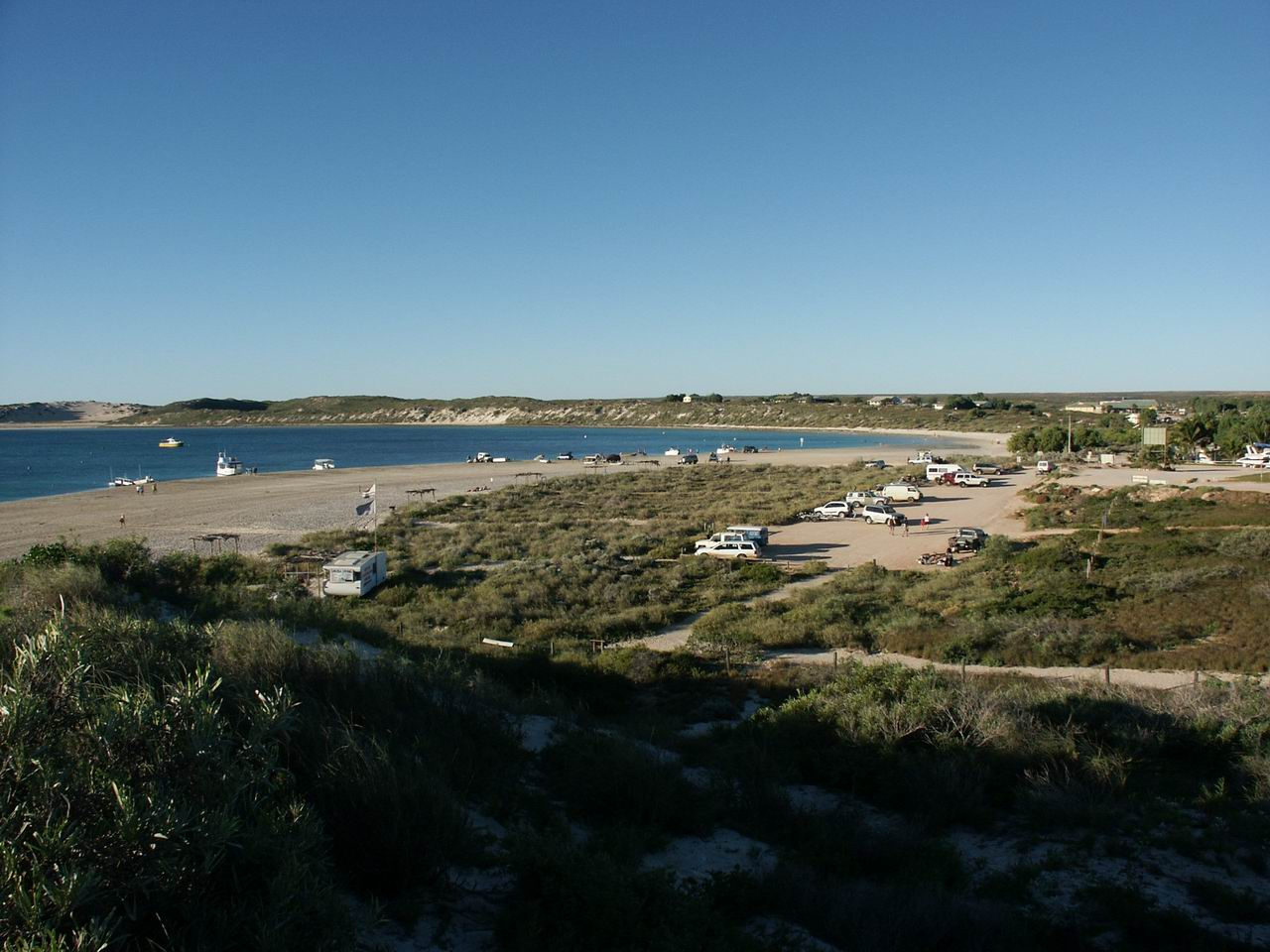
- Coral Bay

- Interactive map of Coral Bay
- Coordinates: 23°8′41″S 113°46′35″E
- Country: Australia
- State: Western Australia
- LGA: Shire of Carnarvon
- Location: 1,132 km (703 mi) NNW of Perth; 138 km (86 mi) S of Exmouth; 399 km (248 mi) W of Paraburdoo

Government
  - State electorate: North West Central
  - Federal division: Durack

Area
  - Total: 2.2 km^{2} (0.85 sq mi)
- Elevation: 5 m (16 ft)

Population
  - Total: 245 (SAL 2021)
- Time zone: UTC+8 (AWST)
- Postcode: 6701

Coral Bay is a small coastal settlement located 1,200 kilometres (750 mi) north of Perth, in the Shire of Carnarvon in the Gascoyne region of Western Australia.

Bordered by the Ningaloo Reef, it is a popular tourist destination and largely owes its survival to revenue derived from wildlife tourism. Coral Bay is a unique location in that the reef fringes the water's edge, making it easily accessible for snorkellers. The climate is arid, and waters are generally warm year-round due to the tropical nature of the area. The 2021 census recorded a population of 245.

== Geography ==
Coral Bay is located on the North West Cape of the Gascoyne region of Western Australia. It sits adjacent to Ningaloo Reef, the world's largest fringing reef system, which covers 604,500 hectares (6,045 km^{2}) of the eastern Indian Ocean and stretches over 300 kilometres (190 mi) along the coast of Western Australia. Coral Bay's geographical coordinates are 23°8′41″S 113°46′35″E. The closest towns are Carnarvon, 238 kilometres (148 mi) to the south, and Exmouth, 152 kilometres (94 mi) to the north. To the east, Coral Bay is bordered by the Lyndon pastoral station. Approximately 43 kilometres (27 mi) south along the eastern boundary is the wetland system Lake Macleod. The town is accessed via Coral Bay Road, which connects to Minilya–Exmouth Road. The closest major highway is the North West Coastal Highway.

=== Geology ===
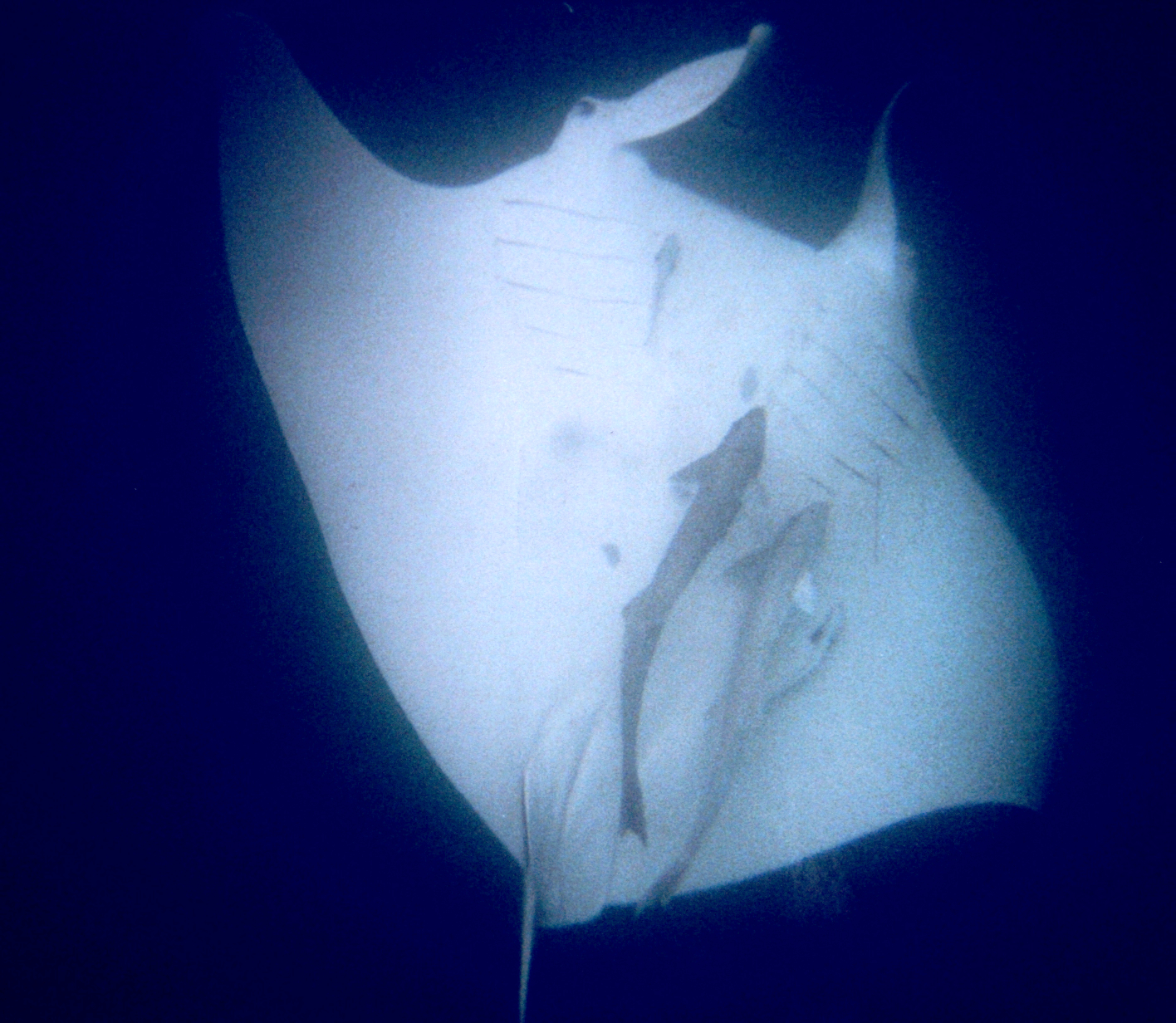
A manta ray with remoras at Ningaloo Reef.

Soils in Coral Bay are sandy and calcareous due to oxide leaching. Coral Bay forms part of the Carnarvon Basin, an area consisting of undulating sand plains that slant toward the ocean, resulting in a low relief open drainage pattern. The surrounding coastline is characterised by limestone platforms. Coral Bay also lies upon the Bullara Sunklands, a depression that runs along the eastern coast of Western Australia from Shark Bay to Exmouth Gulf. The natural vegetation in the area consists of the spinifex, wattle and poverty bush shrub varieties. There is also a strong mangrove presence with Avicennia marina being particularly dominant. Buffel is the most common grass in the region. In the Ningaloo Marine Park more than 200 species of coral fauna can be found, alongside animal species such as green and hawksbill turtles, humpbacks whales, dugongs and whale sharks.

== History ==
The Gascoyne region was originally populated by the Thalandji Aboriginal people. Evidence found by archaeologists indicates that Indigenous people have been present in the Ningaloo region for over 32,000 years. The world's oldest beaded necklace was discovered in the Mandu Mandu Creek Rock-Shelter, alongside camp fire residue in the layers of surrounding limestone caves.

The first known European sighting of the North West Cape was made in early 1618 by a crew member of the Dutch ship Zeewolf. Later that year Captain Jacobz of the ship Mauritius made contact with land, however the district remained largely uninhabited for decades following due to its dry climate and remote location.

The earliest recorded European activity in the Coral Bay region was at Mauds Landing, which acted as a shipping point for wool, sheep and cattle from 1884 to 1946. The port was named after the schooner Maud, whose captain discovered the site 2 km (1.2 mi) north of Coral Bay. The area saw the construction of a jetty in 1896, followed by a tramway, a well and a wool-shed. A hotel and store operated at the site between 1911 and 1921. In 1947, however, Mauds Landing was closed as a coastal port due to funding shortages and its constant need for repairs. The surrounding area formed Cardabia Station, owned by Charles French, which encompassed Bills Bay. The cove was named after his wife Ruby May French, or "Auntie Billie" as she was more commonly known. In 1933 the first building was constructed by Jack McKenna as a holiday retreat.

It was not until the late 1960s that Bills Bay began to form a functioning township, when a section of Cardabia Station was sold to Ken Ryan. Upon this he built a caravan park, a hotel and a service station. The town name Coral Bay likely derived from the Coral Bay Hotel built by Ryan. The area was visited a few years later in 1973 by Bill and Alison Brogan who recognised the potential of the region to become a popular tourist destination. Bill purchased a transportable building, a charter yacht and a sight-seeing boat which he called Miss Coral Bay I. The 1980s saw the formation of a housing estate and the tapping of artesian groundwater.

== Economy ==
Coral Bay's economy is primarily built on nature-based tourism due to its close proximity to the Ningaloo Reef. In 2021 the Australian Bureau of Statistics reported that the majority of the local workforce was employed in tourism or industries related to it.

Coral Bay is marketed widely as a premier holiday destination and the town offers a number of tourist activities such as whale watching, snorkelling and swimming with manta rays. In 2004 The Ningaloo Coast Regional Strategy limited visitor numbers to 3600 overnight tourists, accommodation for 400 semi-permanent workers and 500 day visitors in order to preserve the Ningaloo Reef. In 2019 this was increased from 4,500 to 5,300 to promote the region's growth. Estimates based on daily spending indicate Coral Bay hosts approximately 110,000 visitors annually. Visitors mostly comprised Western Australia based families, in comparison to nearby Exmouth, which attracts a large number of international and inter-state tourists.

Glass-bottom boat tours are available year-round and whale watching tours are available from June to October. Tourists are also provided with the opportunity to go reef fishing, beach fishing and light tackle game fishing outside of sanctuary zones. Manta ray snorkel tours also operate out of Coral Bay. Scenic flights, quad bike tours and catamaran tours are among other activities visitors can engage in.

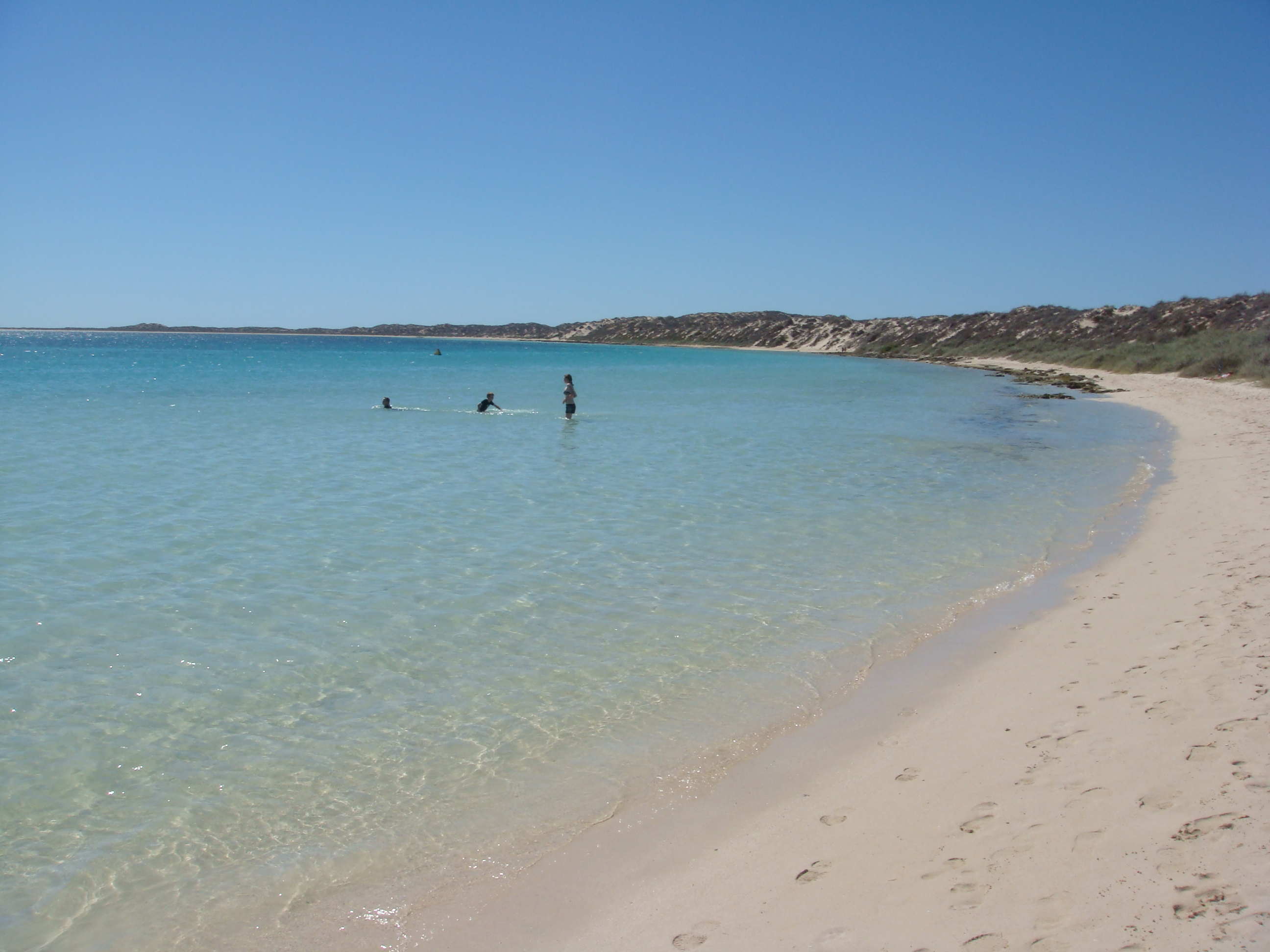
Coral Bay beach

Further tourist attractions in the surrounding area include:

- Oyster bridge
- Paradise Beach
- Bills Bay
- Skeleton Bay Reef Shark Nursery
- Purdy Point
- Point Maud & Mauds Landing

== Facilities ==
Coral Bay sources its water from artesian wells, desalinated for domestic use. The town has three 275 kW wind turbines and a power station with seven low-load diesel engines. Waste-water and sewerage infrastructure are in place. The town also supports an airstrip suitable for light aircraft and a maritime facility with a double boat ramp, two finger jetties, a service jetty and 11 dinghy pens.

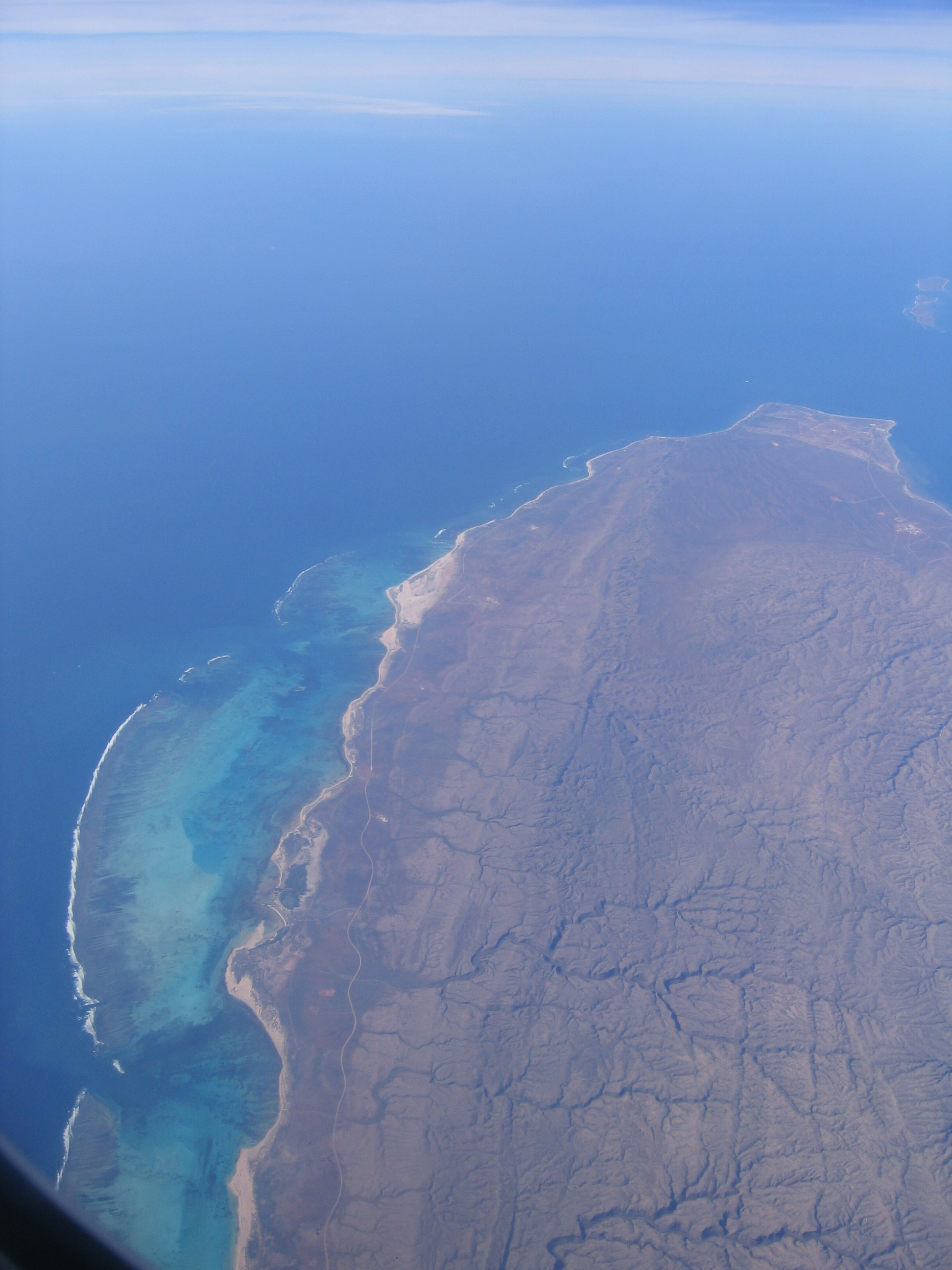
Ningaloo Reef as viewed from above

Coral Bay has two caravan parks and a resort.

There is a small shopping arcade which contains a supermarket, a bakery, tourist shops, and the Coral Bay Nursing Post which provides healthcare services to both residents and visitors. A doctor is available one day a week for residents only. The town also contains several restaurants.

== Heritage listings ==
- Site Of Mauds Landing
- Ningaloo Marine Area
- Ningaloo Coast
- French's Shack
