= Minyirr, Western Australia =

Minyirr
- Suburb
- Interactive map of Minyirr
- Coordinates: 17.98156°S 122.20447°E
- Country: Australia
- State: Western Australia
- City: Broome
- LGA: Shire of Broome
- Location: 1,678 km (1,043 mi) NE of Perth

Government
  - State electorate: Kimberley
  - Federal division: Durack

Area
  - Total: 13.1 km^{2} (5.1 sq mi)

Population
  - Total: 76 (SAL 2021)
- Postcode: 6725
Suburbs around Minyirr
Indian Ocean	Cable Beach	Indian Ocean
Indian Ocean	Minyirr	Indian Ocean
Indian Ocean	Indian Ocean	Indian Ocean

Minyirr is a coastal suburb of Broome, Western Australia. It is located approximately 1,678 km northeast Perth.
