= Major roads in the Mid West region of Western Australia =

Main Roads Western Australia controls the major roads in the state's Mid West region. There are four main highways through the Mid West: The north–south coastal route of Brand Highway and North West Coastal Highway, the inland alternative Great Northern Highway, and the northern section of Goldfields Highway, which links Meekatharra with Kalgoorlie. A network of main roads connects towns within the Mid West to each other, the highways, and neighbouring regions, with local roads providing additional links and access to smaller townsites. Roads are often named after the towns they connect.

Freight vehicles, servicing the mining and agricultural industries, make up a significant proportion of the traffic using the Mid West road network. Tourist traffic primarily focuses on the coastal routes, which connect visitors to Dongara, Geraldton, Northampton and Kalbarri, and nearby tourist attractions.

== Agnew Sandstone Road ==
Agnew Sandstone Road (Mid West region)
- Location: Sandstone
- Length: 89.76 km (55.77 mi)

Agnew Sandstone Road is a main east–west road near the north-eastern edge of the Mid West region. From Sandstone, it travels east towards Agnew in the state's Goldfields–Esperance region.

== Brand Highway ==
Brand Highway (Mid West region)
- Location: Warradarge – Geraldton
- Length: 187.22 km (116.33 mi)
- Route number: National Route 1

Brand Highway is a main north-west to south-east highway in the Mid West region, parallel to the coast. It enters the region a short distance north of the turnoff to Jurien Bay, and continues north-west to Geraldton.

== Chapman Valley Road ==
Chapman Valley Road
- Location: Geraldton – Yuna
- Length: 69.60 km (43.25 mi)

Chapman Valley Road is a main north-east to south-west road in the Mid West region. From Geraldton, it travels north-east for fourteen kilometres (8.7 mi) as a local road until it intersects Morrell Road in Yetna. From that point on it continues as a main road (Moonyoonooka Yuna Road) to Nabawa and then onto Yuna.

== Coolimba–Eneabba Road ==
Coolimba–Eneabba Road
- Location: Coolimba – Eneabba
- Length: 27.38 km (17.01 mi)

Coolimba–Eneabba Road, also known as Coolimba Eneabba Road, Eneabba–Coolimbia Road, or Eneabba Coolimbia Road, is a main east–west road in the south-west of Western Australia's Mid West region. The road connects Indian Ocean Drive at Coolimba with Brand Highway at Eneabba.

== Edward Road ==
Edward Road
- Location: Geraldton – Walkaway
- Length: 23.62 km (14.68 mi)

Edward Road is a major road in the Mid West region, linking Geraldton at its north-west end to Walkaway in the south-east. It runs parallel to Brand Highway, but further inland. Several local roads, as well as Geraldton–Mount Magnet Road, connect Edward Road to the highway.

== Geraldton–Mount Magnet Road ==
Geraldton–Mount Magnet Road
- Location: Geraldton – Mount Magnet
- Length: 335.34 km (208.37 mi)
- Route number: State Route 123

Geraldton–Mount Magnet Road, also known as Geraldton Mt Magnet Road, is a major east–west road through the centre of the Mid West region. It forms the entirety of State Route 123, linking the coastal city of Geraldton with Mount Magnet on Great Northern Highway.

== George Grey Drive ==
George Grey Drive
- Location: Gregory – Kalbarri
- Length: 57.71 km (35.86 mi)
- Route number: State Route 139

George Grey Drive is a major north–south coastal road in the Mid West region. From Port Gregory Road near Gregory, it travels north to Kalbarri National Park and Kalbarri.

Both George Grey Drive and Port Gregory Road were declared State Route 139 in March 2016

== Goldfields Highway ==
Goldfields Highway (Mid West region)
- Location: Meekatharra
- Length: 122.89 km (76.36 mi)

Goldfields Highway is a major east–west road that is mostly unsealed. From Meekatharra, it heads east towards Wiluna in the Goldfields–Esperance region.

== Great Northern Highway ==
Great Northern Highway (Mid West region)
- Location: Mount Gibson – Capricorn
- Length: 842.03 km (523.21 mi)
- Route number: National Highway 95

Great Northern Highway is a main highway through the Mid West region, and part of the Perth to Darwin national highway. From the northern edge of the Wheatbelt, the highway travels north through Paynes Find, Mount Magnet, Cue, and Meekatharra. It continues north for a further 400 kilometres (250 mi), passing the Kumarina Roadhouse on the way, before continuing into the Pilbara region near Newman.

== Indian Ocean Drive ==
Indian Ocean Drive (Mid West region)
- Location: Green Head – Arrowsmith
- Length: 86.41 km (53.69 mi)
- Route number: State Route 60

Indian Ocean Drive is a main north–south coastal road in the south-west of Western Australia's Mid West region. From Green Head, it travels north via Leeman and Coolimba to Brand Highway in Arrowsmith, south of Dongara. It is the northern section of State Route 60, which continues south to central Perth.

== John Willcock Link ==
John Willcock Link
- Location: Geraldton
- Length: 4.20 km (2.61 mi)

John Willcock Link is a major urban road in Geraldton, linking the grade separated interchange between Brand Highway and North West Coastal Highway with the West End and the city's port.

== Midlands Road ==
Midlands Road (Mid West region)
- Location: Walebing – Watheroo
- Length: 77.08 km (47.90 mi)
- Route number: State Route 116

Midlands Road, also known as The Midlands Road, is a major road in the Mid West region. The road enters the region at Gunyidi, continuing north from the Wheatbelt. It travels north-west to Mingenew via Coorow, Carnamah, and Three Springs. Beyond Mingenew, it heads west to Dongara, terminating at Brand Highway. Midlands Roads is the northern section of State Route 116, which continues south to Bindoon.

== Mingenew–Morawa Road ==
Mingenew–Morawa Road
- Location: Mingenew – Morawa
- Length: 58.75 km (36.51 mi)

Mingenew–Morawa Road, also known as Mingenew Morawa Road, is a major east–west road in the Mid West region. From the Midlands Road at Mingenew, it travels east to Mullewa–Wubin Road at Morawa. Mignew–Mullewa Road, which heads north to Mullewa, branches off the road close to its western end at Mignew.

== Morrell Road ==
Morrell Road
- Location: Narra Tarra
- Length: 4.32 km (2.68 mi)

Morrell Road is a major north–south road in Narra Tarra, east of Geraldton, that connects Chapman Valley Road with Narra Tarra Moonyoonooka Road.

== Mount Magnet Sandstone Road ==
Mount Magnet Sandstone Road
- Location: Mount Magnet – Sandstone
- Length: 153.90 km (95.63 mi)

Mount Magnet Sandstone Road is a main east–west road in the Mid West region. From Mount Magnet, the road travels east to Sandstone. Through-traffic can continue east on Agnew Sandstone Road.

== Mullewa–Wubin Road ==
Mullewa–Wubin Road (Mid West region)
- Location: Maya – Mullewa
- Length: 194.36 km (120.77 mi)

Mullewa–Wubin Road, also known as Mullewa Wubin Road, is a major north-west to south-east road mostly in the Mid West region. The road enters the region at Maya, continuing north from Great Northern Highway at Wubin in the Wheatbelt. It heads north-west towards Mullewa, via Latham, Perenjori, and Morawa. The northern terminus is at Geraldton–Mount Magnet Road.

== Narra Tarra Moonyoonooka Road ==
Narra Tarra Moonyoonooka Road
- Location: Narra Tarra – Moonyoonooka
- Length: 10.77 km (6.69 mi)

Narra Tarra Moonyoonooka Road, also known as Moonyoonooka Narra Tarra Road, is a main north–south road in the Mid West region. The road begins at Geraldton–Mount Magnet Road at Moonyoonooka, and heads north to Narra Tarra, where it becomes Morrell Road.

== North West Coastal Highway ==
North West Coastal Highway (Mid West region)
- Location: Geraldton – Eurardy
- Length: 180.19 km (111.96 mi)
- Route number: National Route 1

North West Coastal Highway is a main north–south highway in the Mid West region. It begins at a grade separated interchange with Brand Highway in Geraldton, and from there heads north via Northampton to Eurardy at the northern edge of the Mid West region.

== Port Gregory Road ==
Port Gregory Road
- Location: Northampton – Gregory
- Length: 57.61 km (35.80 mi)
- Route number: State Route 139

Port Gregory Road, also known as Northampton–Port Gregory Road, is a 57.6-kilometre-long (35.8 mi) main east–west road in the Mid West region. From Northampton, it travels west towards the coastal town of Gregory. Just outside the townsite, the road intersects George Grey Drive, and past this point it continues as a local road for the final 5.3 kilometres (3.3 mi).

Both Port Gregory Road and George Grey Drive were declared State Route 139 in March 2016

== See also ==
- List of highways in Western Australia
- List of major roads in rural Western Australia
- List of road routes in Western Australia
- Major roads in the Gascoyne region of Western Australia
- Major roads in the Kimberley region of Western Australia
- Major roads in the Pilbara region of Western Australia
- Major roads in the Wheatbelt region of Western Australia
- Tourist Drives in Western Australia
