= North West Coastal Highway =

Highway in Western Australia

North West Coastal Highway Western Australia
- Map of north-western Western Australia, with North West Coastal Highway highlighted in red

General information
- Type: Highway
- Length: 1,299.06 km (807.20 mi)
- Gazetted: 21 April 1944
- Route number(s): National Route 1 (all sections)
- Tourist routes: Cossack Tourist Way (Tourist Drive 351, Mount Anketell – Roebourne); Batavia Coast Tourist Way (Tourist Drive 354, Geraldton–Ajana)

Major junctions
- South end: Brand Highway (National Route 1), Geraldton
- Geraldton–Mount Magnet Road (State Route 123); Shark Bay Road (Tourist Drive 353); Nanutarra Munjina Road (State Route 136)
- North end: Great Northern Highway (National Highways 1/95), Mundabullangana

Location(s)
- Major settlements: Northampton, Carnarvon, Roebourne, Whim Creek

Highway system
- Highways in Australia; National Highway • Freeways in Australia; Highways in Western Australia

North West Coastal Highway is a generally north–south Western Australian highway which links the coastal city of Geraldton with the town of Port Hedland. The 1,300-kilometre-long (808 mi) road, constructed as a sealed two-lane single carriageway, travels through remote and largely arid landscapes. Carnarvon is the only large settlement on the highway, and is an oasis within the harsh surrounding environment. The entire highway is allocated National Route 1, part of Australia's Highway 1, and parts of the highway are included in tourist routes Batavia Coast Tourist Way and Cossack Tourist Way. Economically, North West Coastal Highway is an important link to the Mid West, Gascoyne and Pilbara regions, supporting the agricultural, pastoral, fishing, and tourism industries, as well as mining and offshore oil and gas production.

In Geraldton, the highway begins at a grade separated interchange with Brand Highway and roads providing access to the port and town centre. Two major roads link the North West Coastal Highway to the inland Great Northern Highway: Geraldton–Mount Magnet Road in Geraldton, and Nanutarra Munjina Road at Nanutarra, 845 kilometres (525 mi) further north. Several roads link provide access to coastal towns and attractions, including Shark Bay Road, Onslow Road and Karratha Road. With few towns on the highway, roadhouses are the only settlements for long stretches. North West Coastal Highway ends at Great Northern Highway, 30 kilometres (19 mi) out from Port Hedland.

North West Coastal Highway was created in 1944 from existing roads and tracks through remote pastoral areas. However, it was a hazardous route that could be dusty in the dry season, and boggy or washed away in the wet season. Economic growth and development in northern Western Australia prompted initial improvement efforts in the late 1940s, and a sealed road was constructed from Geraldton to Carnarvon by 1962. The impact of cyclones and seasonal flooding resulted in a realignment inland of the Carnarvon to Port Hedland section, which was constructed and sealed between 1966 and 1973, and required thirty new bridges. Various upgrades have been carried out in sections across the length of the highway, including the Geraldton Southern Transport Corridor project which grade-separated the highway's junction with Brand Highway.

== Route description ==
North West Coastal Highway is the coastal route through Western Australia's remote north-west. From the Mid West city of Geraldton, the highway heads north 50 kilometres (31 mi) to the small town of Northampton, and another 425 kilometres (264 mi) to Carnarvon, the only large settlement along the route. It continues north-east for 660 kilometres (410 mi) to Roebourne, 30 kilometres (19 mi) beyond the turnoff to Karratha, and ends 160 kilometres (99 mi) further east at Great Northern Highway, 30 kilometres (19 mi) out from Port Hedland. Apart from Whim Creek, between Roebourne and Port Hedland, roadhouses serving the highway are the only settlements on the long stretches of rangeland expanses between these towns. The highway provides access to tourist destinations including Shark Bay, Coral Bay, and Exmouth. North West Coastal Highway supports the diversified economies of the Mid West and Gascoyne regions, including mining, agriculture, fishing and tourism, transitioning to primarily mining, pastoral stations and offshore oil and gas production in the Pilbara.

The entire highway is allocated National Route 1, part of Australia's Highway 1, and parts of the highway are included in the tourist routes Batavia Coast Tourist Way (Tourist Drive 354) and Cossack Tourist Way (Tourist Drive 351). The vast majority of the highway is a two-lane single carriageway with a speed limit of 110 kilometres per hour (70 mph), except in and around built up areas where it drops down to 50, 60, or 70 kilometres per hour (30, 35, or 45 mph).

Main Roads Western Australia monitors traffic volume across the state's road network, including various locations along North West Coastal Highway. In the 2012/13 financial year, the recorded traffic volumes ranged from 13,350 vehicles per day west of Geraldton–Mount Magnet Road down to 370 north of Minilya–Exmouth Road. The highest percentage of heavy vehicles was 45.5%, west of Karratha Road. Reports commissioned by the Royal Automobile Club of Western Australia (RAC) in 2006 and 2008 gave most of the highway a four-star safety rating out of five, but with a significant proportion rated at a three-star level. (Note: Three-star sections included (approximately) the first 150 kilometres (90 mi) north of Geraldton, a 15-kilometre (9 mi) stretch south of Carnarvon, and four 40-to-80-kilometre-long (25 to 50 mi) sections between Carnarvon and the turnoff to Dampier.) The overall highway network was generally rated as three-star or four-star, with around 10% in 2006 and 5% in 2008 receiving a two-star rating.

=== Geraldton to Carnarvon ===
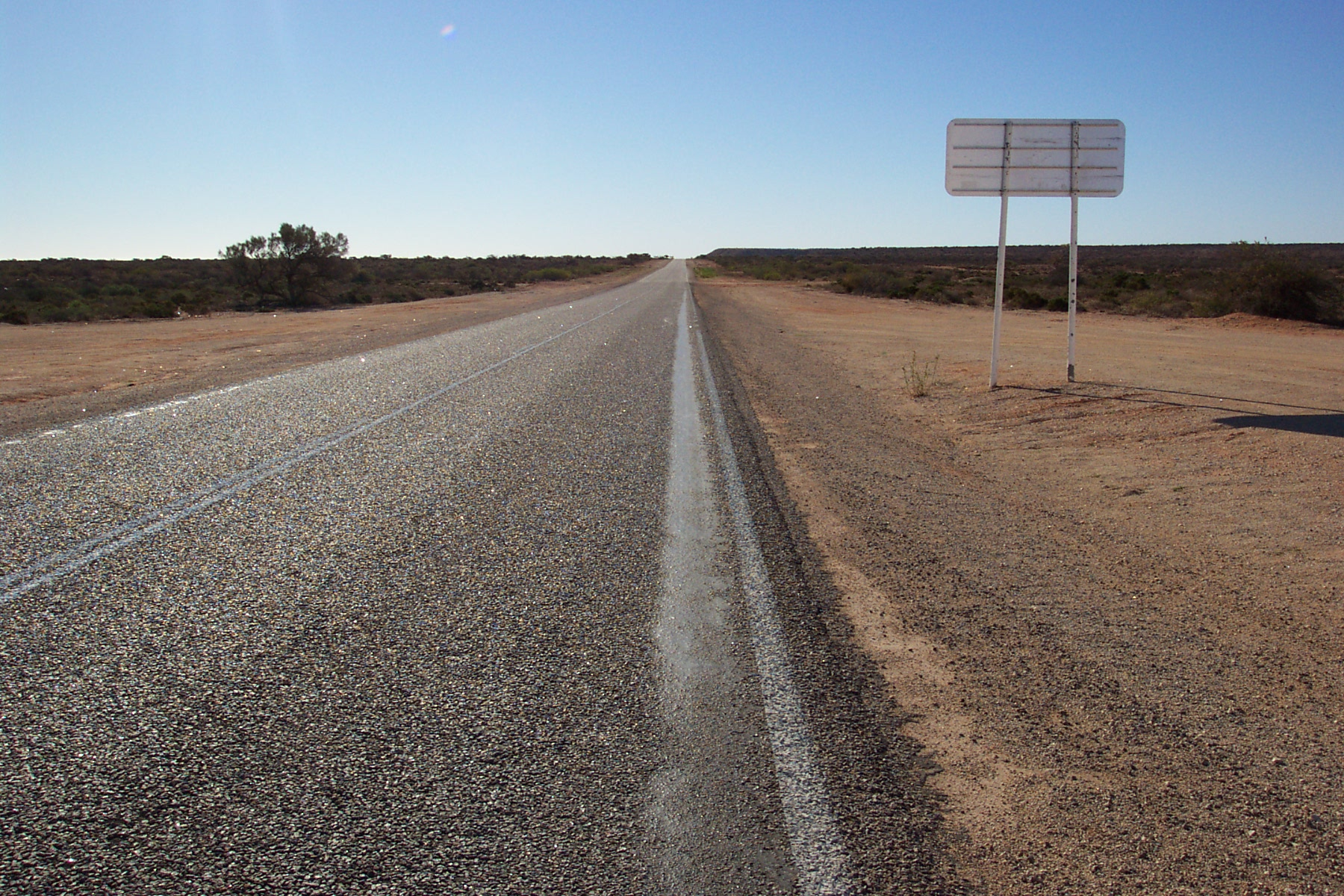
View south along North West Coastal Highway, about 27 km (17 mi) south of the Wooramel Roadhouse

North West Coastal Highway commences at a diamond interchange at the northern end of Brand Highway. It heads east from the interchange and curves round to the north, past a traffic-light intersection with Geraldton–Mount Magnet Road. The highway continues north through Geraldton's outer suburbs for eight kilometres (5 mi) before the landscape transitions to scrubland. Between Geraldton and Carnarvon, the highway passes through remote and dry semi-desert areas. Apart from Northampton, 50 kilometres (31 mi) out from Geraldton, the only settlements over this 475-kilometre (295 mi) stretch are four roadhouses. Binnu Roadhouse (Note: Binnu Roadhouse: 28.0420°S 114.6735°E) is 11 kilometres (7 mi) south of Kalbarri Road, the turnoff to Kalbarri; Billabong Roadhouse (Note: Billabong Roadhouse: 26.8161°S 114.6142°E) is 50 kilometres (31 mi) south of the Shark Bay turnoff, where the Overlander Roadhouse (Note: Overlander Roadhouse: 26.4113°S 114.4643°E) is located; and the Wooramel Roadhouse (Note: Wooramel Roadhouse: 25.7706°S 114.2939°E) is near the Wooramel River crossing.

Carnarvon, at the mouth of the Gascoyne River, is the only large town between Geraldton and Karratha, and is an oasis within an arid region. East of the town, the landscape near the river features banana and other horticultural plantations, while the vegetation in the surrounding region is primarily shrublands. The highway skirts east of Carnarvon, and crosses the Gascoyne River nine kilometres (6 mi) north-east of Robinson Street, the main road into the town.

=== Carnarvon to Port Hedland ===
North of Carnarvon, the highway passes through desert and becomes very flat. Bridges span many ephemeral rivers and creeks, with strands of eucalyptus along their floodplains. The next roadhouse, 135 kilometres (84 mi) beyond Carnarvon, is the Minilya Roadhouse adjacent to the Minilya River. (Note: Minilya Roadhouse: 23.8152°S 114.0093°E) Seven kilometres (4 mi) further on is the turnoff to the North West Cape area, including Cape Range National Park, Coral Bay and Exmouth.

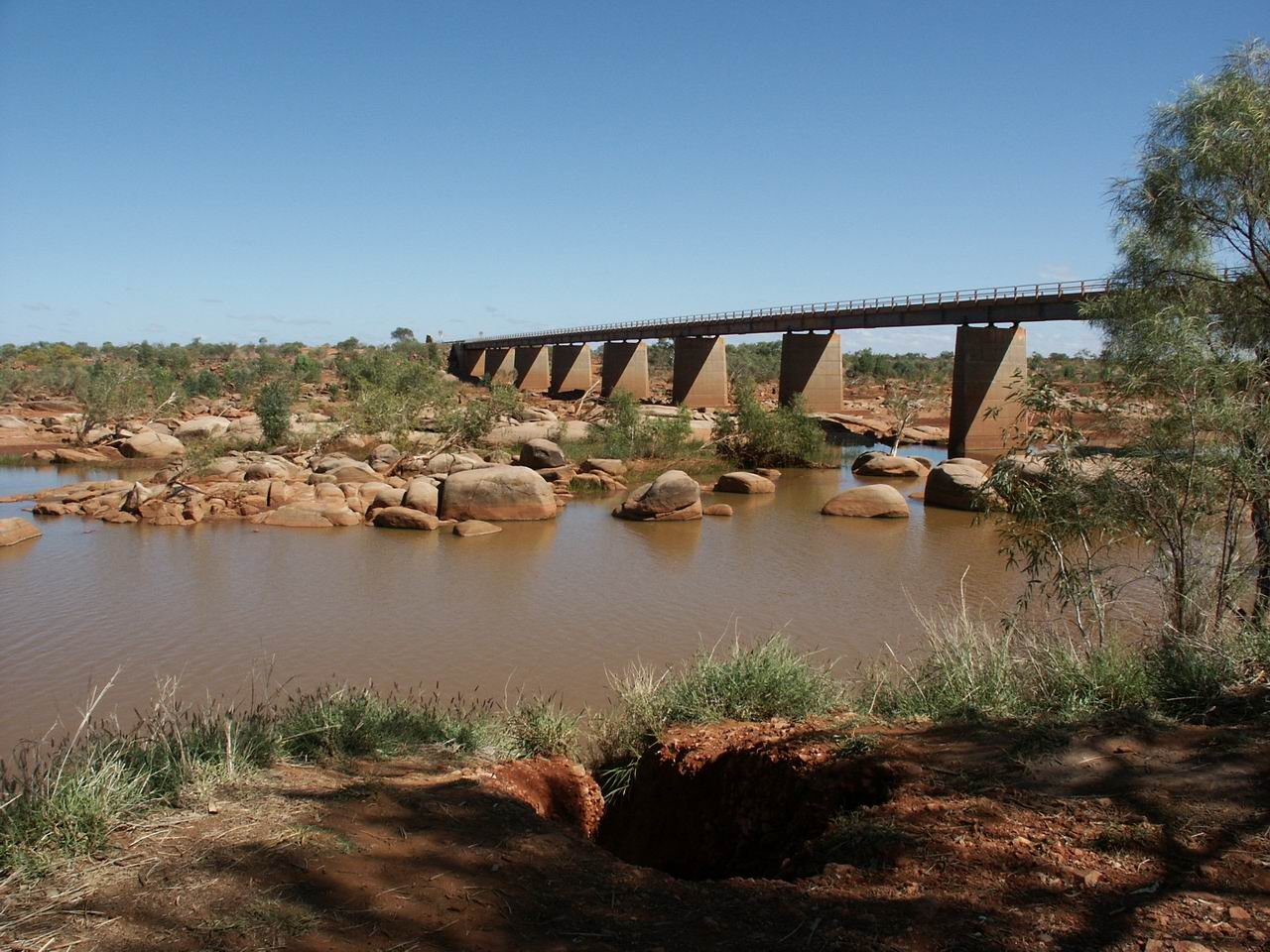
Crossing the Ashburton River

North West Coastal Highway reaches the Pilbara after 100 kilometres (62 mi), where it deviates further inland. The highway continues north-east for 130 kilometres (81 mi), crossing the Ashburton River close to Nanutarra Roadhouse. (Note: Nanutarra Roadhouse: 22.5428°S 115.5007°E) Nearby it intersects Nanutarra Munjina Road, an access road to the mining towns of Tom Price and Paraburdoo and the ghost town of Wittenoom.

Over the next 260 kilometres (160 mi), the road crosses the Robe River, near the turnoff to Pannawonica, the Fortescue River, adjacent to the Fortescue River Roadhouse, (Note: Fortescue River Roadhouse: 21.2954°S 116.1382°E) and Maitland River, before it reaches Karratha Roadhouse. (Note: Karratha Roadhouse: 20.7952°S 116.7780°E) The roadhouse is located at the turnoff to Karratha, the nearby town of Dampier, and the Burrup Peninsula. Forty kilometres (25 mi) east, Roebourne is the gateway to Wickham, Point Samson and the ghost town of Cossack. The highway continues east 125 kilometres (78 mi) to the locality of Whim Creek, crosses the Yule River after a further 55 kilometres (34 mi), and finishes 20 kilometres (12 mi) beyond at Great Northern Highway, 30 kilometres (19 mi) south-west of Port Hedland and South Hedland.

== History ==
=== Origins ===
Before the mid-1920s, travelling north from Geraldton necessitated going through Mullewa, Dairy Creek and Gascoyne Junction. In 1926, a direct route joining Geraldton and Carnarvon was constructed, shortening the trip by 160 km (100 mi). At first, this was little more than a rough bush track, at least partly used for extracting sandalwood. As there was often little water along this route, tanks with catchment roofs were built at eight locations along the track. The tanks were named for their distance from Carnarvon, at 40, 55, 85, 110, 125, 150, 180, and 200 miles. These tanks provided a life-saving function but when the road was later sealed, they became less important and were gradually removed except for Number 8 tank. Number 8 tank is still used by travellers and marks a point 100 mi (200 km) from Geraldton, 200 mi (300 km) from Carnarvon.

Western Australia's Nomenclature Advisory Committee (Note: Now the Geographic Names Committee) proposed in October 1940 that a highway name be used to describe the main route from Midland to Geraldton, and extending to areas further north. The suggested name was Great Northern Highway, following on from the naming of the Great Eastern and Great Southern highways. By July 1941, the committee's proposal had expanded to three highway names for the roads in the state's northern areas: Great Northern Highway for the Midland Junction to Wyndham road, Geraldton Highway for the Walebing–Mingenew–Geraldton route, (Note: Modern-day The Midlands Road and Brand Highway) and North West Coastal Highway for "the road from Geraldton to De Grey, via Northampton, Galena, Carnarvon, Boolaganoo, Winning Pool, Giralia, Yanrey, Onslow, Peedamullah, Mardie, Karratha, Roebourne, Whim Creek, Mundabullangana and Port Hedland". The proposal was well received by the local municipal councils and road boards.

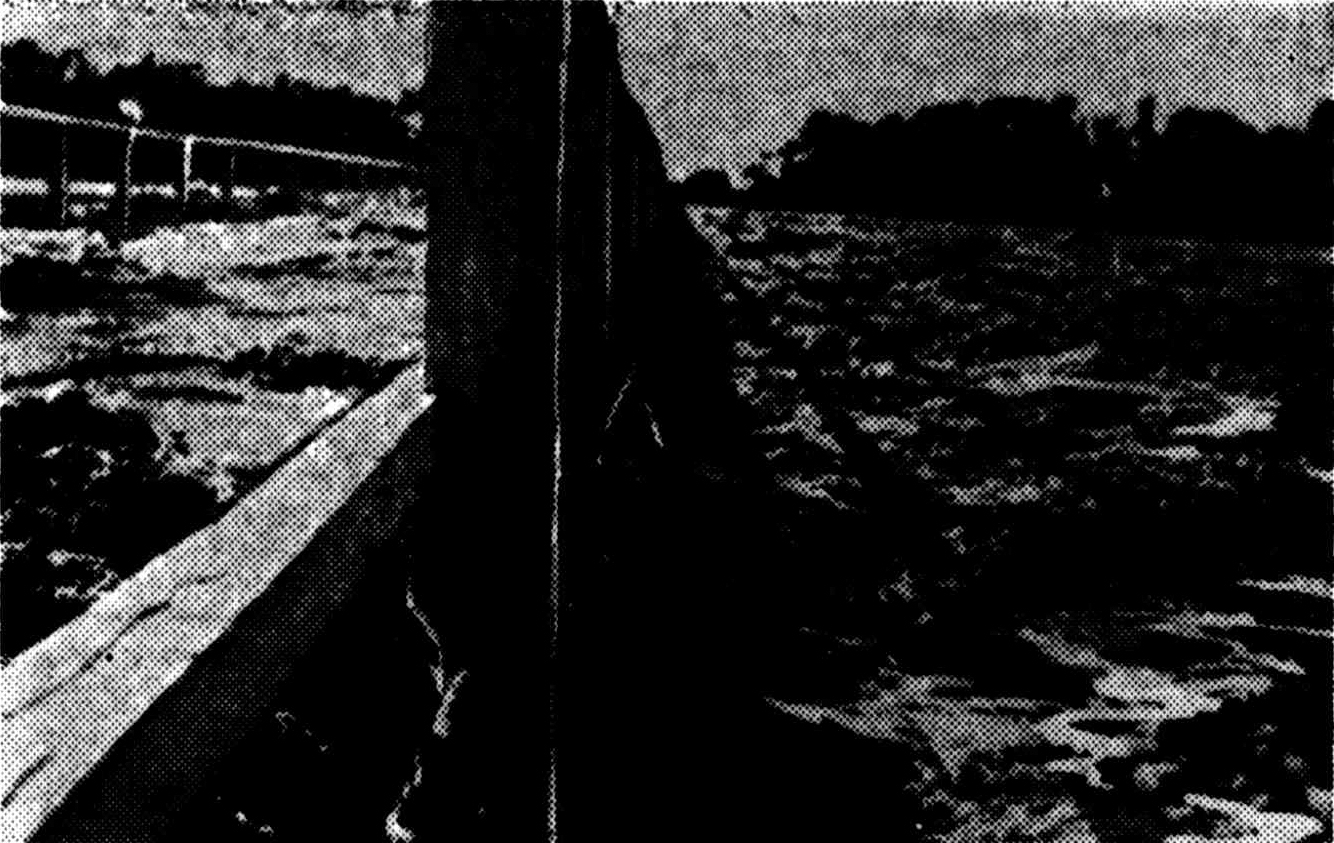
The flooded Gascoyne River in Carnarvon, 1942, with water rushing over the deck of the bridge. During such floods, roads could become bogs or be completely washed away.

The name North West Coastal Highway was gazetted on 21 April 1944, under section 10 of the Land Act, 1933–1939. However, the highway was mostly a series of tracks through remote pastoral areas, with the sealed road ending just past Northampton, approximately 50 kilometres (31 mi) north of Geraldton. Driving was difficult and hazardous all year round. The road was very dusty in the dry season, and some sections of the road were effectively impassable sand, while other sections contained limestone outcrops that damaged tyres. During the wet season, when rivers flooded, sections of road were essentially bogs, or worse still, were completely washed away.

Economic growth and development in Western Australia's northern regions in the 1940s prompted the state to quadruple road funding between 1946 and 1952. Two "gangs" of workers were allocated to a 900-mile (1,400 km) length of North West Coastal Highway. Given the vast distance the highway travelled, and destructive cyclones in the Pilbara and Gascoyne that could destroy multiple weeks worth of work, the overall improvement was relatively insignificant. Over time, though, the road was improved.

=== Sealing ===
In the late 1950s a significant project was undertaken to seal the highway between Geraldton and Carnarvon. The sealed road had progressed northwards in the preceding years, but only by approximately eight to ten miles (13 to 16 km) each year. The rate of work increased rapidly, and by 1960, a 100-mile (160 km) stretch extending south from Carnarvon had been sealed. By the middle of that year, the sealing reached 135 miles (217 km) beyond Geraldton and came 114 miles (183 km) south of Carnarvon, with a 76-mile-long (122 km) gap. The project was completed in 1962 when the two sections converged at the 455-mile peg, (Note: The peg indicated the distance from Perth, 732 kilometres.) and was officially opened on 1 September. Completion of the sealed road resulted in increased tourist traffic, and a longer tourist season.

A large cyclone swept through the Carnarvon area in February 1961, causing much devastation to the road network. Many floodways were completely washed away, and North West Coastal Highway was immersed in flood water for 60 miles (97 km) either side of Onslow. Carnarvon was cut off from general traffic for two weeks, and the damage to the roads in the region took months to repair. Approval was given to realign the road further inland, where it would be less susceptible to flooding.

By the 1960s North West Coastal Highway had become a crucial connection for development in the Pilbara – including the pastoral industry, tourism, and the emergence of iron ore mining. In 1966 the traffic volume was up to 125 vehicles per day, and the unsealed road needed constant maintenance to cope with this demand. There were also frequent delays due to flooding. In 1966 the state government announced that the sealed road would be extended to Port Hedland, over a nine-year period. Substantial portions of the highway would also be relocated above the flood plain. The new alignment on higher ground would be 50 miles (80 km) shorter, and would make bridging rivers easier.

External images
- Main Roads Department builds the North West Coastal Highway, February 1970 – sealing works near Winning Pool.
- Official opening of the North West Coastal Highway, 6 December 1974 – opened by Premier Charles Court.

Work started at Carnarvon, and 190 miles (310 km) had been completed by 1969. Locally available material was used to great extent during construction, with techniques adjusted based on what was available; however, some resources were transported across vast distances. Water, scarce in the dry climate of the North West, was conveyed up to 15 miles (24 km), aggregate up to 100 miles (160 km), and bitumen up to 850 miles (1,370 km). The project required thirty bridges, over riverbeds that could be dry all year, but might receive as much as 1,300 millimetres (51 in) of rainfall in three months, as had been the case at Onslow in 1961. The bridges were designed to withstand twenty-year floods, but more severe possibilities were anticipated – the approaches were built lower than the bridge decks, so that excess water would flow around the bridges, rather than over them.

The sealing of North West Coastal Highway was nearing completion in 1973; additional resources provided to complete the work resulted in the final section, Port Hedland to Roebourne, being finished in only five months. An official opening ceremony was held at South Hedland on 6 December 1974, with the road pronounced open by Premier Charles Court. The final cost of the project was approximately $31 million, substantially more than the initial estimate of $17 million. This was mainly due to two factors: increased construction standards, and inflation, which rose from 4% to 13% between 1970 and 1974.

=== Further improvements ===
In the 1980s the highway's flood resistance was improved with the construction of new, higher-level bridges to replace lower crossings. Galena Bridge over the Murchison River opened on 9 December 1983, and a new bridge over the Harding River near Roebourne was opened on 22 March 1985. In the late 1980s the various sections of road across Western Australia's road network were upgraded or reconstructed, with the worst segments prioritised. In August 1988, work on upgrading five and a half kilometres (3.4 mi) of North West Coastal Highway was completed, the final section between Geraldton and Carnarvon to have been brought up to standard. In the following two years, segments with a combined length of 241 kilometres (150 mi) were resealed, and 45 kilometres (28 mi) was widened from 6.2 to 7 metres (20 to 23 ft), with a one-metre-wide (3.3 ft) sealed shoulder on each side.

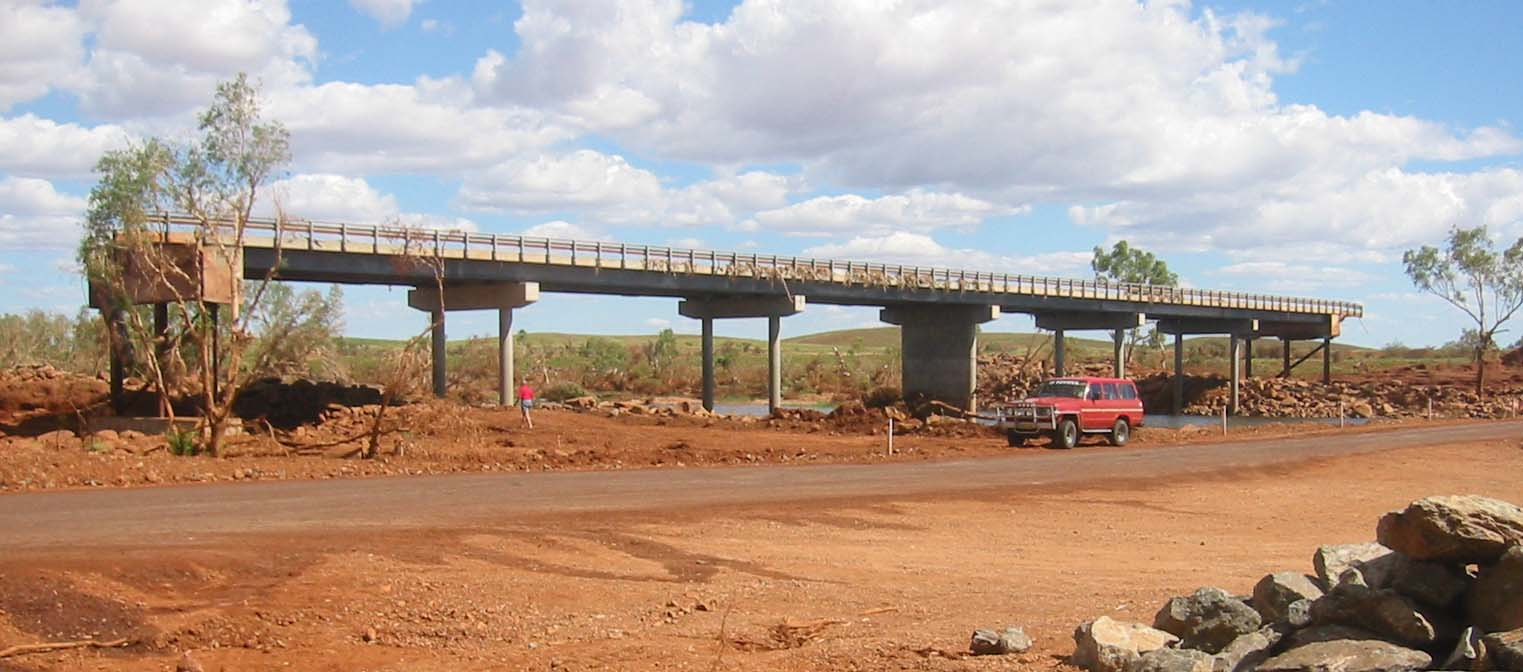
Maitland River bridge following Cyclone Monty, 2004

The northernmost section of the highway, from Great Northern Highway to Port Hedland, was made part of Great Northern Highway in early 1996. Over a ten-year period from 1996 to 2006, numerous improvements were made to the highway, with sections widened, reconstructed, and realigned. Intersections and stretches through townsites were also redesigned, existing bridges were strengthened, and new bridges replaced older bridges or floodways. Additional work was necessary to repair damage from natural events. Sections washed away by floods in January 2003 were rebuilt, and opened in October of that year, and repairs to the damage from Cyclone Monty in March 2004 were completed that November.

The biggest individual project in this period, across all of rural Western Australia, was Stage 1 of the Geraldton Southern Transport Corridor. The project, constructed between March 2004 and December 2005 at a cost of $92.5 million, involved the relocation of railway tracks, five kilometres (3.1 mi) worth of road works, and grade separation of roads. North West Coastal Highway's southern terminus at Brand Highway was upgraded from a roundabout to an interchange, and an overpass was built for Durlacher Street to cross North West Coastal Highway. The highway was also made into a dual carriageway in the vicinity of the interchange. Stage 2 of the project, constructed between December 2008 and December 2009, provided a single carriageway connection from a traffic light-controlled intersection on the highway to Geraldton–Mount Magnet Road, with access to Geraldton Airport.

In 2013 work began on a project to seal the highway's shoulders from Yannarie River at Barradale to the Onslow turn-off; it is expected to be completed by mid-2015. Further work to widen the highway between Minilya and Barradale, including replacing two floodways with bridges, is expected to be completed by the end of 2017.

== Major intersections ==
LGA	Location	km	mi	Destinations	Notes
Greater Geraldton	Geraldton	0	0.0	Brand Highway (National Route 1 / Tourist Drive 354) south / Cathedral Avenue north / John Willcock Link west – Perth, Geraldton, Geraldton Port, Geraldton Regional and St John of God Geraldton hospitals	Southern terminus at diamond interchange: continues as John Willcock Link
Greater Geraldton	Mount Tarcoola	0.77	0.48	Geraldton–Mount Magnet Road (State Route 123) – Mullewa, Mount Magnet, Geraldton Airport	Traffic-light intersection
Greater Geraldton	Geraldton	1.20	0.75	Utakarra Road	
Greater Geraldton	Sunset Beach–Spalding–Glenfield–Waggrakine quadripoint	8.24	5.12	Chapman Valley Road – west to Chapman Road, east to Nabawa, Yuna	Roundabout (Chapman Valley Rotary)
Northampton	Bowes–East Bowes boundary	49.72	30.89	Northampton–Nabawa Road – Nabawa	
Northampton	Northampton	52.06	32.35	Stephen Street to Horrocks Road / to Port Gregory Road – Horrocks, Gregory, Kalbarri	
Northampton	Ajana	100.66	62.55	Kalbarri Road (Tourist Drive 354) – Kalbarri, Kalbarri National Park	Tourist Drive 354 (Batavia Coast Tourist Way) northern concurrency terminus
Murchison River		114.14– 114.25	70.92– 70.99	Galena Bridge	
Shark Bay	Hamelin Pool	281.38	174.84	Shark Bay Road (Tourist Drive 353) – Denham, Monkey Mia, Shark Bay	
Wooramel River		358.86– 358.96	222.99– 223.05	Bridge over river	
Carnarvon	Kingsford–Brown Range boundary	475.67	295.57	Robinson Street west – Carnarvon	T junction: northbound traffic turns east, southbound traffic turns south
Carnarvon	South Plantations–Inggarda boundary	483.05	300.15	Carnarvon–Mullewa Road – Gascoyne Junction, Kennedy Range and Mount Augustus national parks	
Gascoyne River		484.71– 484.94	301.18– 301.33	Gascoyne River Bridge	
Carnarvon	Minilya	619.76	385.10	Minilya–Exmouth Road – Coral Bay, Exmouth	
Lyndon River		661.29– 661.37	410.91– 410.96	Bridge over river	
Ashburton	Yannarie	728.80	452.86	Burkett Road – Coral Bay, Exmouth	
Ashburton River		839.32– 839.56	521.53– 521.68	Bridge over river	
Ashburton	Nanutarra	844.50	524.75	Nanutarra Munjina Road (State Route 136) – Paraburdoo, Tom Price	
Ashburton	Cane	884.85	549.82	Onslow Road – Onslow	
Ashburton	Fortescue	961.74	597.60	Pannawonica Road – Pannawonica	
Fortescue River		1,003.14– 1,003.54	623.32– 623.57	Bridge over river	
Karratha	Gap Ridge–Cooya Pooya boundary	1,098.24	682.41	Manuwarra Red Dog Highway – Millstream-Chichester National Park, Tom Price	Formerly known as Warlu Road until September 2020
Karratha	Gap Ridge–Cooya Pooya–Stove Hill tripoint	1,098.55	682.61	Madigan Road – Dampier, Karratha, Burrup Peninsula	
Karratha	Cooya Pooya–Stove Hill–Mount Anketell tripoint	1,107.58	688.22	Karratha Road (Tourist Drive 351) – Karratha, Dampier	Tourist Drive 351 (Cossack Tourist Way) western concurrency terminus
Karratha	Roebourne	1,138.35	707.34	Point Samson Roebourne Road (Tourist Drive 351) – Wickham, Point Samson	Tourist Drive 351 (Cossack Tourist Way) eastern concurrency terminus
Karratha	Sherlock	1,167.49	725.44	Roebourne–Wittenoom Road – Karijini and Millstream–Chichester national parks	
Yule River		1,278.09– 1,278.45	794.17– 794.39	Bridge over river	
Port Hedland	Mundabullangana	1,299.06	807.20	Great Northern Highway (National Highway 1 northeast / National Highway 95 southeast) – Port Hedland, Newman, Tom Price	Northern terminus: continues as Great Northern Highway northeast bound
Concurrency terminus

== See also ==
- Highways in Australia
- List of highways in Western Australia
