= Nanutarra, Western Australia =

Locality in Western Australia

Coordinates: 22°32′37″S 115°30′06″E

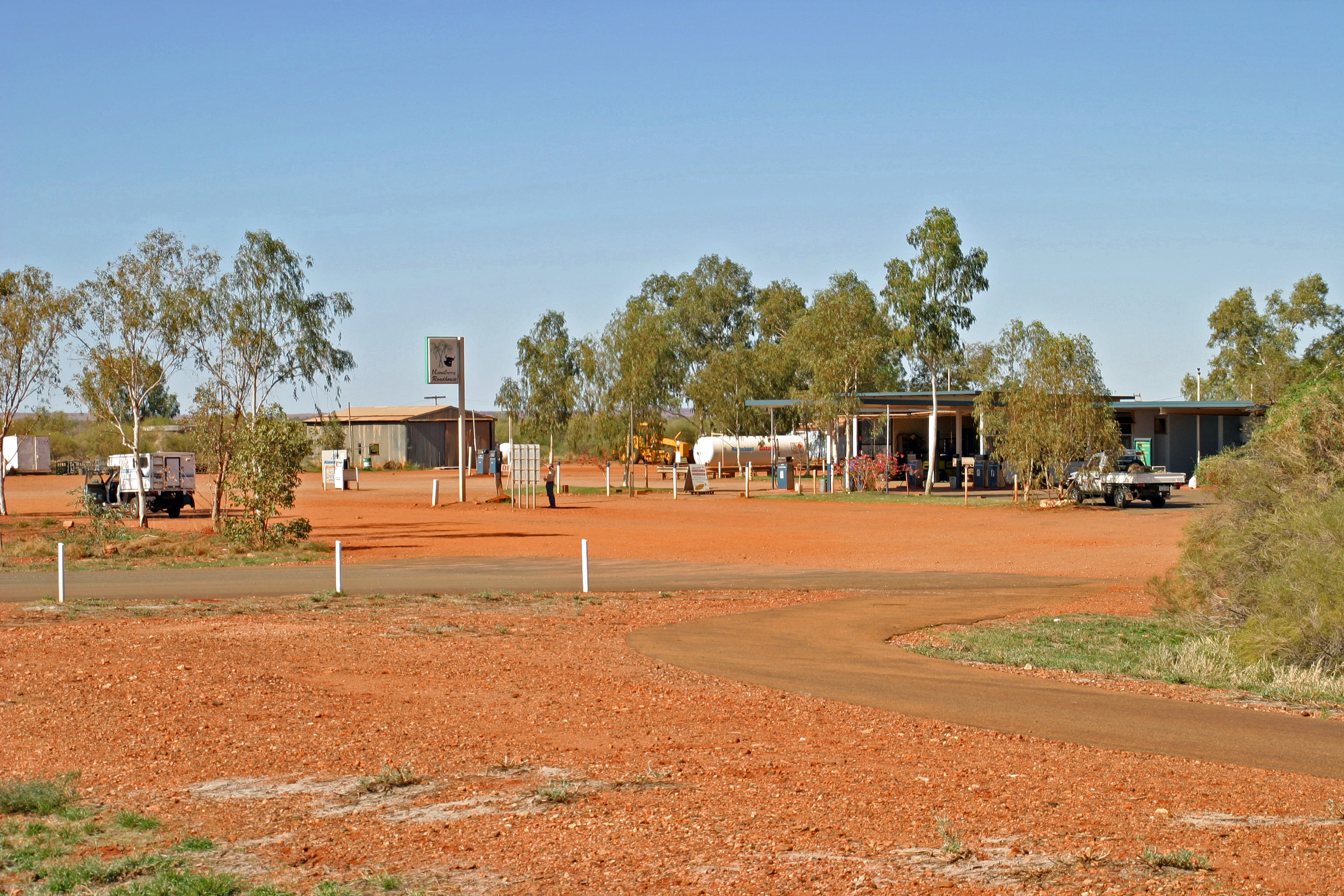
Nanutarra, Western Australia

Nanutarra is a locality in Western Australia adjacent to the point at which the North West Coastal Highway passes over the Ashburton river. It is also near the turn-off for State Route 136 to Paraburdoo and Tom Price. It is 40 kilometres (25 mi) south of the Onslow turn-off in the Cane River conservation park where it is on either side of the highway. The name 'Nanutarra' originated from an Aboriginal word for a bulrush growing in the area.

== History ==
The Ashburton River, and thus the location of the current locality was discovered to Europeans in 1861 by Francis Gregory, the President of the Royal Geographical Society.

The territory of the town was initially used as grazing land in the 1877 by a man known as Harry Highman, who later constructed the Nanutarra Station in 1879.

Thanks to Highman's intervention, the area flourished in sheep hearding, with up to 45,000 sheep being present in the locality, attracting neighbouring eyes. He would die in 1917.

In the year 1965 Frank Baxter decided to builtd the "Nanutarra Roadhouse" just three kilometres from the original Nanutarra homestead, thus becoming the main source of revenue for the entire area. The structure is still functioning today.

In 2005 Nanutarra was given permanent status on the Western Australian Register of Heritage Places.

In 2024, the PKKP Aboriginal Corporation (PKKP) had acquired the historic Nanutarra Homestead.

== Etymology ==
The name is related to the locality, the pastoral lease Nanutarra Station, the bridge over the Ashburton river, the mine and the roadhouse.

Due to its isolation from other localities, it is a reference point to issues along the North West Coastal Highway from some distance in either direction.

== Geography ==
To the south, the nearest significant stopping place, 217 kilometres (135 mi) away, is Minilya: to the north the Fortescue River roadhouse is 160 kilometres (99 mi) distant.

== Climate ==
Nanutarra has a hot arid climate (Köppen BWh) with sweltering summers, very warm winters and extremely erratic rainfall. Tropical cyclones can smash into the town and may produce more than the average annual rainfall in a single storm; but in the absence of cyclones or winter cloudbands long periods may pass without any rainfall at all. For instance, only 84.4 millimetres or 3.32 inches of rain fell in all of 1919, but as much as 221.0 millimetres or 8.70 inches fell on 18 February 1921 alone and as much as 442.6 millimetres or 17.43 inches in March 2000.

Climate data for Emu Creek Station
Month	Jan	Feb	Mar	Apr	May	Jun	Jul	Aug	Sep	Oct	Nov	Dec	Year
Record high °C (°F)	49.1 (120.4)	49.8 (121.6)	47.0 (116.6)	42.6 (108.7)	39.3 (102.7)	32.8 (91.0)	32.6 (90.7)	35.6 (96.1)	40.4 (104.7)	44.4 (111.9)	46.4 (115.5)	48.4 (119.1)	49.8 (121.6)
Mean daily maximum °C (°F)	41.3 (106.3)	40.2 (104.4)	38.5 (101.3)	34.9 (94.8)	29.8 (85.6)	26.0 (78.8)	25.4 (77.7)	27.3 (81.1)	30.6 (87.1)	34.3 (93.7)	36.8 (98.2)	39.8 (103.6)	33.7 (92.7)
Mean daily minimum °C (°F)	24.4 (75.9)	25.1 (77.2)	23.8 (74.8)	20.7 (69.3)	16.1 (61.0)	12.6 (54.7)	11.3 (52.3)	12.2 (54.0)	14.0 (57.2)	16.8 (62.2)	19.3 (66.7)	22.3 (72.1)	18.2 (64.8)
Record low °C (°F)	16.8 (62.2)	16.4 (61.5)	15.1 (59.2)	12.5 (54.5)	7.6 (45.7)	4.7 (40.5)	2.5 (36.5)	2.0 (35.6)	5.7 (42.3)	8.4 (47.1)	12.0 (53.6)	15.3 (59.5)	2.0 (35.6)
Average rainfall mm (inches)	45.2 (1.78)	65.6 (2.58)	39.9 (1.57)	20.5 (0.81)	35.6 (1.40)	37.0 (1.46)	22.1 (0.87)	11.6 (0.46)	2.0 (0.08)	2.1 (0.08)	3.9 (0.15)	13.4 (0.53)	298.9 (11.77)
Average rainy days (≥ 0.2 mm)	4.7	6.1	3.9	1.9	3.2	4.1	2.6	1.6	0.6	0.4	0.7	1.5	31.3

== Demographics ==
According to the latest census conducted in 2021, up to 37 people lived in the locality, 60% being male and 40% being female, with a median age of 37. This shows that the population has been in decline. In fact in the 2016 census, there were up to 72 people, 79.7% of which male and 20.3% female, with a median age of 38.

== See also ==
- List of roadhouses in Western Australia
