= Globe Hill Station =

Pastoral lease in Western Australia

Coordinates: 22.6053°S 115.215°E

Location in Western Australia

Globe Hill Station is a defunct pastoral lease that was once a sheep station and a cattle station in Western Australia.

It is situated approximately 10 kilometres (6 mi) south of Onslow and 130 kilometres (81 mi) east of Exmouth in the Pilbara region. The property shared a boundary with Minderoo and Nanutarra Station.

The traditional owners of the area are the Thalanyji peoples, who know the area as Wurrumarlu or the Globe Hill country.

The property was established at some time prior to 1883, and was trading wool in that year.

George McRae and another man named Harper owned the property in 1884 and it had been substantially improved with wells, pumps and a wool shed having all been built, and was stocked with 14,000 sheep.

In 1907 the property was still running sheep and was owned by McRae.

Frederick Bedford and Thomas Frederick de Pledge acquired the station in 1909 for £35,000. Globe Hill was incorporated into Yanrey Station by de Pledge. At one stage Yanrey was the third largest property in the Ashburton District, with a size of 876,892 acres (354,866 ha).

The properties had a combined flock of approximately 80,000 sheep in 1909 with 10,000 being lost during a storm.

The area was later struck by a drought which broke in early 1913.

== See also ==
- List of ranches and stations
- List of pastoral leases in Western Australia
