= 2011–12 Australian bushfire season =

2011-12 Australian bushfire season
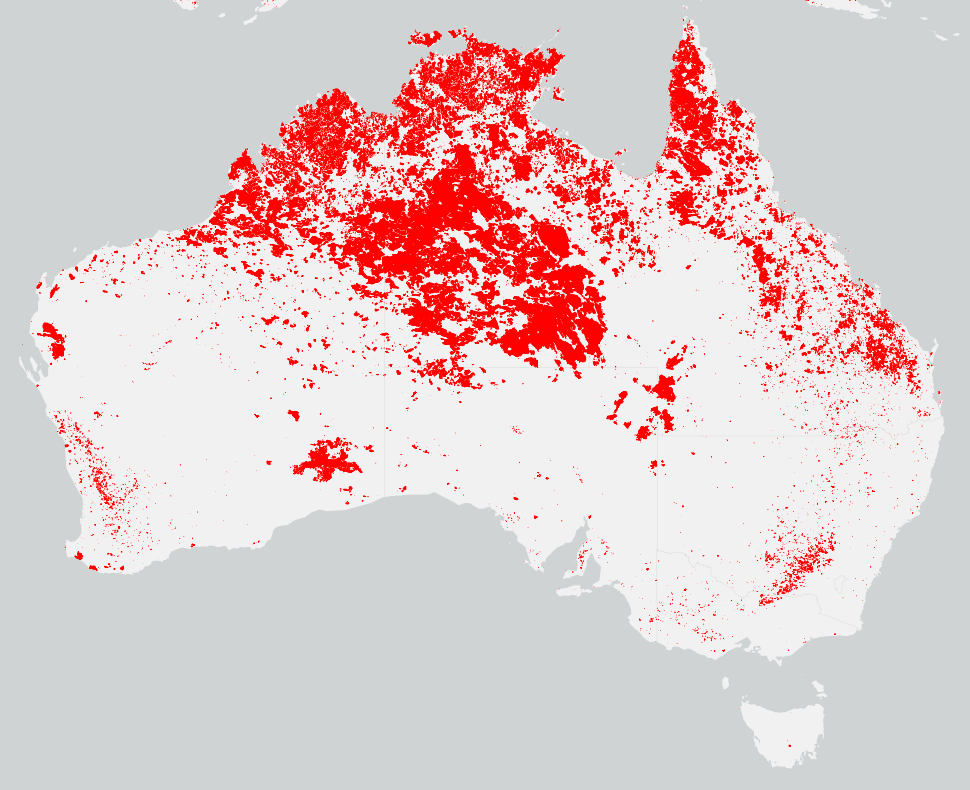
- NASA MODIS burned area detections from June 2011 to May 2012
- Date: Winter (June) 2011 – Autumn (May) 2012
- Location: Australia

Statistics
- Burned area: >14,076 square kilometres (5,435 sq mi)

Impacts
- Deaths: 0
- Injuries: 4 (at least)
- Structures destroyed: 39 lost, at least 20 damaged

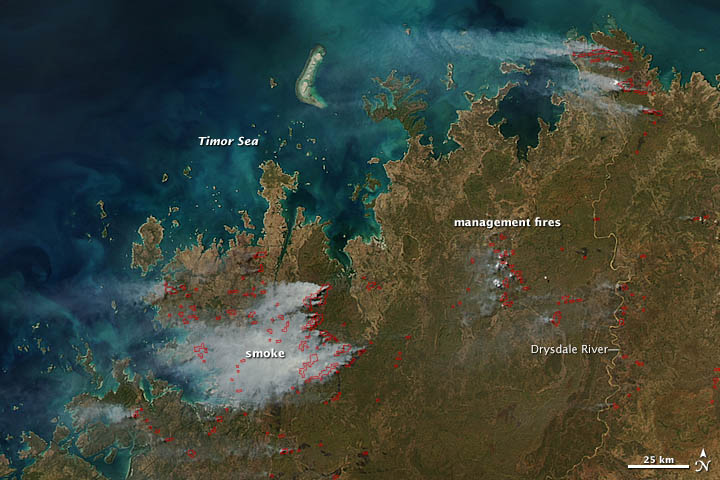
Fires in Western Australia 2012 - NASA Earth Observatory

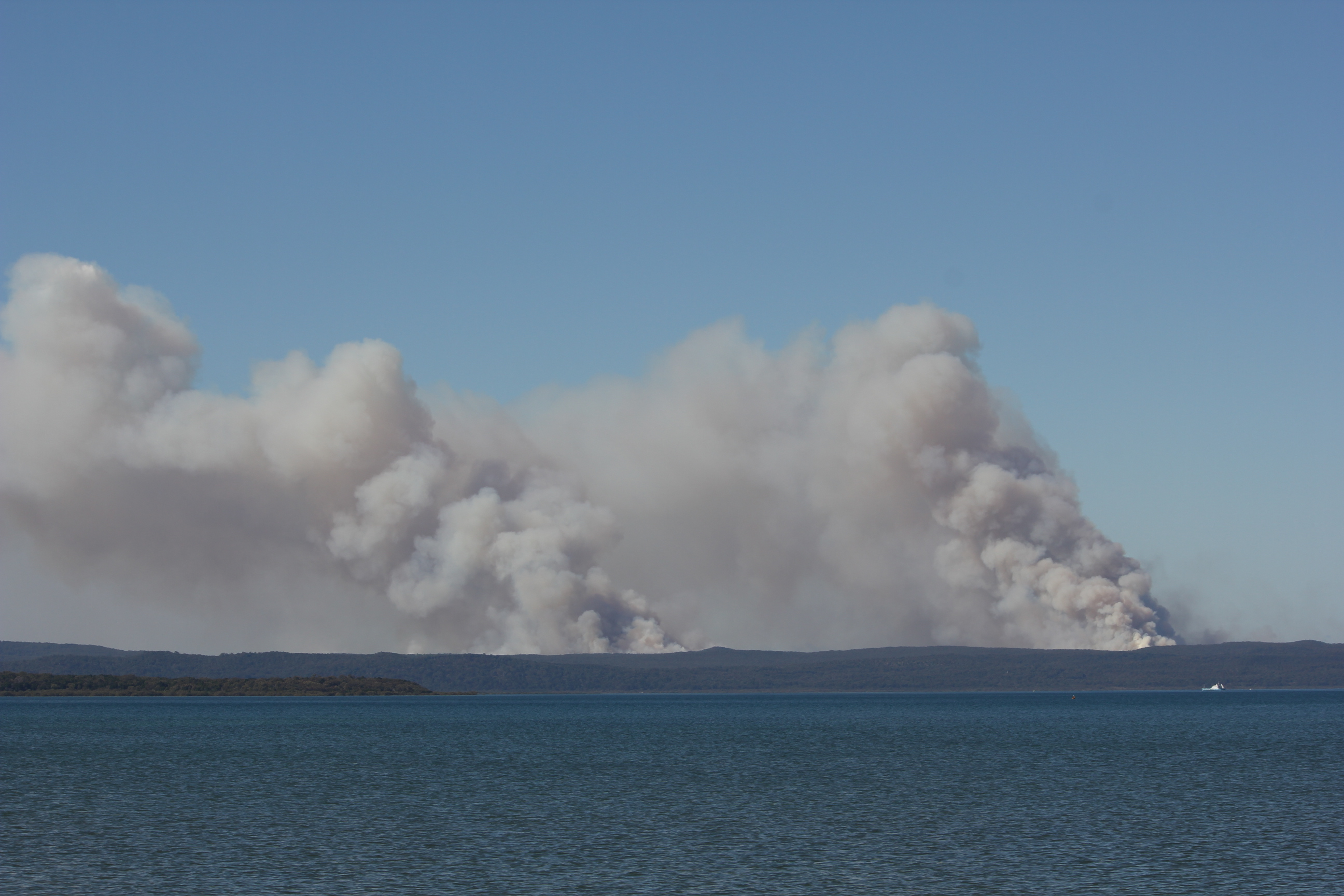
Controlled burn off on North Stradbroke Island

Bushfires were mostly active between September 2011 to March 2012 and caused most damage in the state of Western Australia, particularly in the South West. The state had been prepared and had expected an increased risk of bushfire following heavy spring rains as a result of a La Nina weather pattern.

== September ==
Northern Territory

Large fires swept through the Barkly Tableland and Victoria River districts, destroying large tracts of grazing land. Fire fronts estimated at 50 kilometres (31 mi) were reported; the Barkly fire resulted in 7,000 square kilometres (2,700 sq mi) of country being burnt with another 2,000 square kilometres (770 sq mi) being lost in the Victoria River district.

Western Australia

During the Kimberley Ultramarathon on 2 September, a bushfire raced through the course, engulfing a group of four participants at El Questro Station. Two men escaped the flames, suffering severe burns but the two females were trapped, each suffering critical injuries. Thirty grass fires were burning in Kimberley at the same time. Several other fires were burning through the Kimberley, resulting in the loss of 60,000 hectares (150,000 acres) of grassland. It has since been discovered that Kimberley locals were lighting fires before and on the day of the race.

== October ==
NSW

A bushfire at Katoomba and the Blue Mountains on 24 October caused some houses and a school to be evacuated, over 100 fire-fighters and three aircraft responding to contain the blaze. Some minor property damage occurred but no homes were lost in the blaze.

== November ==
WA

A fire broke out near Margaret River in the South West region on 23 November. Temperatures in excess of 30 °C (86 °F) and strong winds fanned what began as a controlled burn in the Leeuwin-Naturaliste National Park. The fire soon swept over the town causing hundreds of people from Prevelly, Gnarabup and the town outskirts to be evacuated to the beach. By the following day dozens of homes had been lost to the fire, including historic Wallcliffe House. The premier, Colin Barnett, declared Margaret River a Natural Disaster Zone and promised a full inquiry as to how the fire started. The fire was controlled by 26 November after burning through 3,400 hectares (8,400 acres) of land and leaving a total of 39 homes destroyed and another 14 damaged, but there were no deaths.

Other bushfires were recorded at the same time about 30 kilometres (19 mi) south west of Nannup, another near Three Springs, a third near Peron and a fourth north of Denmark.

In the Pilbara region a large bushfire burnt through an area of 650 square kilometres (251 sq mi) of bushland in the Nimingarra area close to the Yarrie minesite.

== December ==
WA

The Denmark fire was contained but warnings remained by 1 December, a total of 5,600 hectares (14,000 acres) were lost. The Nannup fire continued to burn and was not contained until 3 December, by 2 December it had claimed some 30,000 hectares (74,000 acres), it had started as a prescribed burn but had raged out of control. Once finally extinguished it had burnt out about 55,100 hectares (136,000 acres) of land.

A large fire in the Pilbara region had burned out over 1,500 square kilometres (579 sq mi) of bushland and rangeland by 26 December. A large portion of Giralia Station was burnt out with the firecoming close to the homestead before being extinguished. Yanrey and Koordarrie Stations were also threatened by the blaze.

== January ==
QLD

Moreton Island suffered a grass fire that burnt out 160 hectares (400 acres) of the island vegetation and came within 500 metres (1,600 ft) of the small community of Cowan which was protected by backburning. The fire started on 4 January and was expected to burn for weeks.

SA

A fire that started 4 January and burnt for three days burnt 8,000 hectares (20,000 acres) of pastoral lands, damaging stock in an area approximately 40 kilometres (25 mi) south east of Port Augusta.

VIC

A fire broke out in the Grampians on 4 January and was thought to have been started by lightning. 150 fire-fighters battled the blaze along with water bombing aircraft. Over 230 hectares (570 acres) of bushland was burnt in the blaze.

WA

A fire that started in late December in the Yalgoo Shire was mostly contained by 5 January after burning out an area of 18,500 hectares (46,000 acres) of bushland. More fires were also ignited in the Kearney State forest, near Nannup, resulting from lightning strikes.

A large fire in the Gascoyne burnt out approximately 30 kilometres (19 mi) of grazing and bushland. It spread over a distance of 45 kilometres (28 mi), leading to the temporary closure of the North West Coastal Highway and other roads around Kennedy Range National Park. The fire burnt for a week after a smaller fire escaped containment lines on 8 January, burning out over 3,300 square kilometres (1,300 sq mi) by 15 January and then continuing to burn until 30 January.

Other fires that broke out late in January in Wooroloo and Chittering were both under control by 30 January.

== February ==
WA

The town of Northcliffe was menaced by a bushfire that came within 8 kilometres (5.0 mi) of the townsite on 22 February. Smoke haze from the fire effected the south west coast of the state. The fire had been ignited by lightning on 8 February and had burnt out over 16,000 hectares (40,000 acres) 14 February and was expected to burn over 30,600 hectares (76,000 acres) before being contained.

== March ==
WA

A fire broke out north of Nannup and was brought under control by 14 March. 113 personnel, 13 trucks and 4 earthmovers were used in containing the blaze. The suburb of Koondoola was struck by a fire that threatened homes on 28 March. The fire that started under suspicious circumstances burnt out 45ha of bushland and required 55 fire-fighters and waterbombers to bring it under control.
