= List of State Register of Heritage Places in the Shire of Ashburton =

The State Register of Heritage Places is maintained by the Heritage Council of Western Australia. As of 2026, 85 places are heritage-listed in the Shire of Ashburton, of which six are on the State Register of Heritage Places.

== List ==
The Western Australian State Register of Heritage Places, as of 2026, lists the following six state registered places within the Shire of Ashburton:

Place name	Place #	Location	Suburb or town	Co-ordinates	Built	State registered	Notes	Photo
Nanutarra Station Complex	1743	Lot 4 North West Coastal Highway	Nanutarra	22°32′20″S 115°29′53″E	1878	4 November 2005	Consists of a mud brick and iron Victorian-Georgian style homestead and outbuildings	
Old Onslow Townsite	3444	Reserve 35118	Talandji	21°42′44″S 114°56′54″E	1885	17 February 2006	A rare example of an historical archaeological site of a former frontier settlement in a remote area of the north-west of Western Australia.	
Old Onslow Police Station	3949	Corner Old Merrow & Denzil Street	Talandji	21°42′44″S 114°56′54″E			Part of Old Onslow Townsite Precinct (3444)	
Old Onslow Tramway and Jetty	4232	Old Onslow Townsite	Talandji	21°42′44″S 114°56′54″E			Part of Old Onslow Townsite Precinct (3444)	
Peedamulla Homestead (ruin)	4656	Great Northern Highway	50 kilometres south of Onslow	21°50′41″S 115°37′36″E	1915	2 September 1998	Example of north-west architecture with stone walls, surrounding verandahs, corrugated iron roof and a separate kitchen	
Tambrey Station Homestead Ruins	1743	Roebourne Wittenoom Road	Chichester	21°38′07″S 117°36′22″E	1885	30 October 1998	Also referred to as Coolawanyah Station; Ruins of a single-storey mud brick and iron dwelling	
