= Indiana Teahouse =

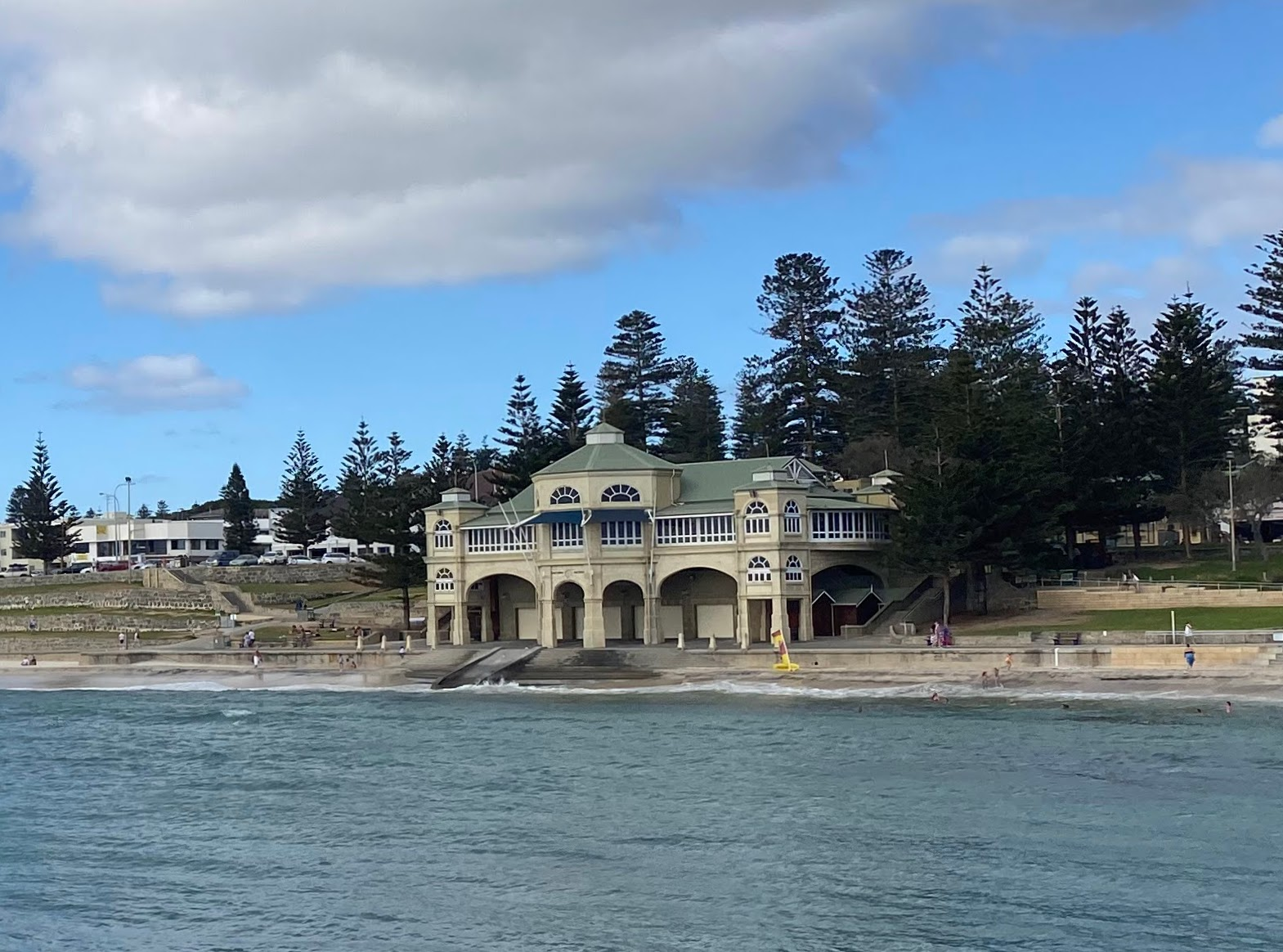
- Indiana Teahouse in 2023

General information
- Architectural style: Neotraditional
- Location: 91 Marine Parade, Cottesloe, Western Australia
- Coordinates: 31.9968°S 115.7516°E
- Construction started: 1994
- Opened: October 1996

Design and construction
- Architect: Laurie Scanlan

Western Australia Heritage Register
- Type: State Registered Place
- Designated: 8 June 2021
- Reference no.: 16637

The Indiana Teahouse is a State Heritage Listed landmark building in Cottesloe, Western Australia.

It has been widely described as one of Perth's iconic landmarks, and is frequently featured in tourism and promotional material as a site representative of Perth.

== History ==
The Indiana Teahouse was designed and constructed from 1994 to 1996 by architect Laurie Scanlan. It is named after the Indiana Tea House which was located at the site from 1913 to 1970 and is designed in a style intended to be reminiscent of the Centenary Bathing Pavilion which was located at the site from 1929 to 1982. The current structure was built to accommodate what at the time was seen as a growing need of the patrons of Cottesloe Beach. The current structure incorporates an earlier bathing pavilion built in 1983 into its lower floor.

The building has been leased by the State Government to Andrew and Nicola Forrest since 2019. Andrew Forrest announced controversial plans to significantly redevelop the building that same year, fielding submissions from a design competition. The plans were quickly met with community backlash and have since gone through numerous revisions. In 2025, plans were approved by the local council to construct a sauna on the terrace level of the building. These plans are currently awaiting approval from the WA Planning Commission.

In 2021, the Indiana Teahouse and surrounding Cottesloe Beach were placed on the State Register of Heritage Places citing landmark status to the community and international tourists as reasons for its significance.

The Marine Parade level of the building currently contains Indigo Oscar, a Latin-American inspired restaurant.

== In popular culture ==
The building and surrounding beach were praised by Taylor Swift in a 2012 diary entry associated with the release of her album Lover. In the entry she described the Indiana Teahouse as "one of the most beautiful places [she'd] been," and mistakenly believed it to have been built in 1910.

The building appears in the 2004 Australian TV series Foreign Exchange.
