= Uaroo =

Pastoral lease in Western Australia

Coordinates: 22.783°S 115.372°E

Location in Western Australia

Uaroo Station is a pastoral lease that operates as a cattle station and has previously operated as a sheep station.

It is located about 130 kilometres (81 mi) south of Onslow and 240 kilometres (149 mi) west of Paraburdoo in the Pilbara region of Western Australia.

The property shares boundaries with Nanutarra, Glenflorrie, Winning, Nyang and Yanrey Stations. Uaroo encompasses an area of 2,470 square kilometres (954 sq mi) and has a variety of landforms. Rous Creek runs north to south through the property for a distance of 60 kilometres (37 mi) and the flanking alluvial plains have the highest pastoral value. About one third of the property is made up of sandy plain country that supports spinifex grasslands dived by rugged hills and ridges.

Established prior to 1901, the property was owned by Joseph McCarthy in that year. The store at Uaroo was important to the many prospectors in the area as it was the only place they could obtain provisions, the next nearest being at Onslow. McCarthy was running sheep at the time. In 1923 a flock of 15,239 sheep were grazing on the property.

In 1953 the pastoral company that owned the property sold it for £27,500, including the flock of 7,000 sheep. The purchaser was Michael Stroud, of Koodarrie.

The station sold in 2012 along with neighbouring Nanutarra Station; the two were being operated as one holding. Together the leases occupied an area of 4,803 square kilometres (1,854 sq mi) and had a herd of approximately 2,750 cattle, with an estimated maximum carrying capacity of 7,600 head. The property contains 70 equipped watering points along with many permanent and semi-permanent waterholes along the creek and river systems. Both properties had been acquired by Andrew Forrest, who also owns Minderoo Station, north of Uaroo.

== See also ==
- List of ranches and stations
