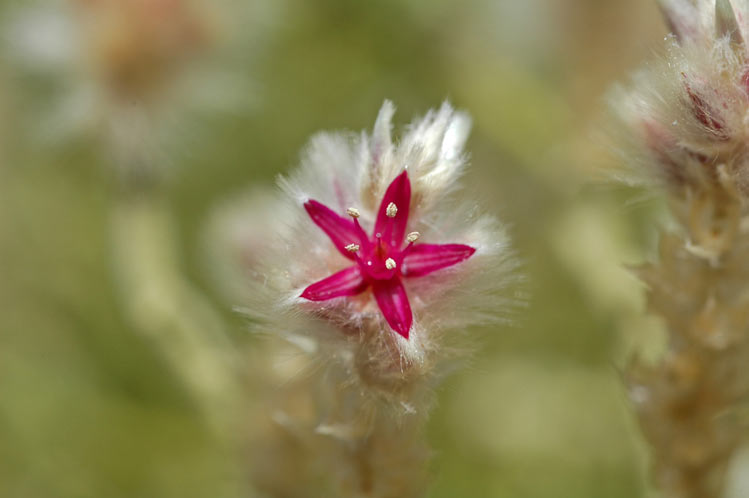
- Near the Yanrey turnoff

Scientific classification
- Kingdom: Plantae
- Clade: Tracheophytes
- Clade: Angiosperms
- Clade: Eudicots
- Order: Caryophyllales
- Family: Amaranthaceae
- Genus: Ptilotus
- Species: P. arthrolasius

Binomial name
- Ptilotus arthrolasius F.Muell.

Synonyms
- Ptilotus forrestii F.Muell.; Trichinium arthrolasium (F.Muell.) F.Muell. ex Benth.; Trichinium forrestii (F.Muell.) C.A.Gardner

= Ptilotus arthrolasius =

Species of grass-like plant

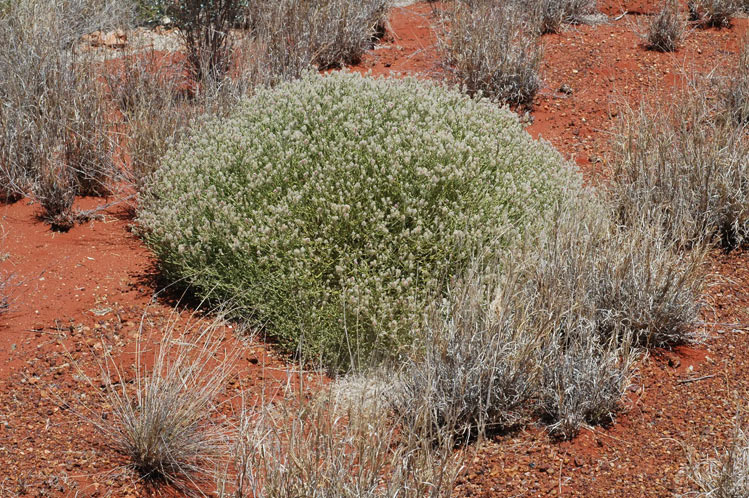
Habit

Ptilotus arthrolasius is a species of flowering plant in the family Amaranthaceae and is endemic to north-western Australia. It is a compact perennial herb or shrub with oblong to lance-shaped leaves, and spikes of maroon to pink flowers with five fertile stamens.

== Description ==
Ptilotus arthrolasius is a compact perennial herb or shrub that typically grows to 20–75 cm (7.9–29.5 in) high, has many branches, and is covered with short, yellow hairs. Its leaves are oblong to lance-shaped, 5–85 mm (0.20–3.35 in) long, 1.5–12 mm (0.059–0.472 in) wide and narrowed into a short petiole. The flowers are maroon to pink and borne in cylindrical to hemispherical spikes 8–55 mm (0.31–2.17 in) long and 8–17 mm (0.31–0.67 in) wide on a peduncle less than 12 mm (0.47 in) long with bracts 3.3–3.8 mm (0.13–0.15 in) long and bracteoles 3.3–3.6 mm (0.13–0.14 in) long. The tepals are 5.3–6.2 mm (0.21–0.24 in) long with a tapered tip with five fertile stamens and a style 1.8–2.1 mm (0.071–0.083 in) long. Flowering occurs from April to October.

== Taxonomy ==
Ptilotus arthrolasius was first formally described in 1868 by Ferdinand von Mueller in his Fragmenta Phytographiae Australiae from specimens he collected near "Sturt's Creek". The specific epithet (arthrolasius) means 'shaggy or hairy branches'.

== Distribution and habitat ==
This species of Ptilotus is widespread in the Carnarvon, Central Ranges, Dampierland, Gascoyne, Gibson Desert, Great Sandy Desert, Little Sandy Desert, Murchison, Ord Victoria Plain, Pilbara and Tanami bioregions of northern Western Australia and the Northern Territory, where it grows in pebbly red loam on sandplains and sand dunes.

== Conservation status ==
This species of Ptilotus is listed as "not threatened" by the Government of Western Australia Department of Biodiversity, Conservation and Attractions, and as of "least concern" under the Northern Territory Territory Parks and Wildlife Conservation Act.

== Gallery ==
Ptilotus arthrolasius

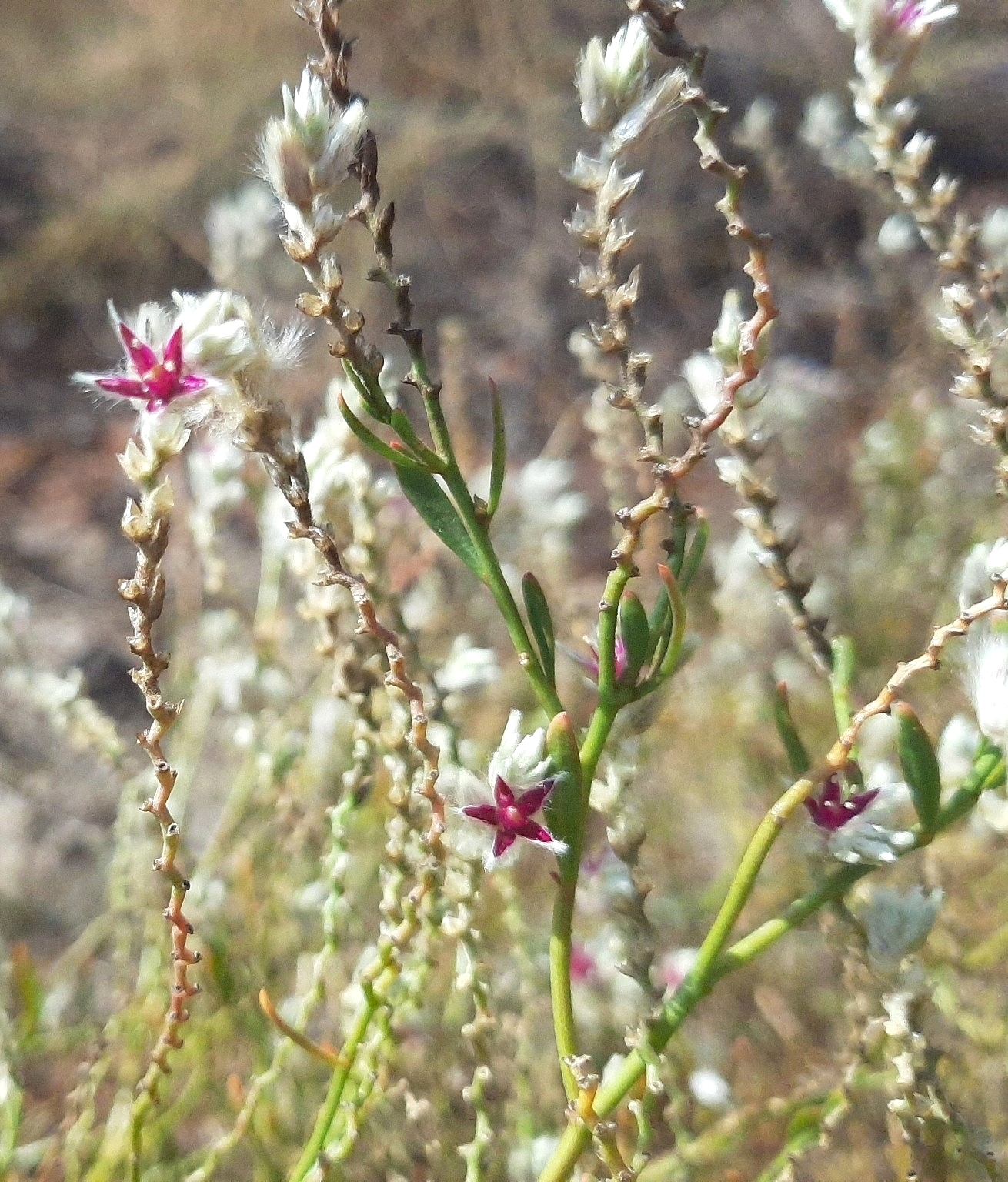

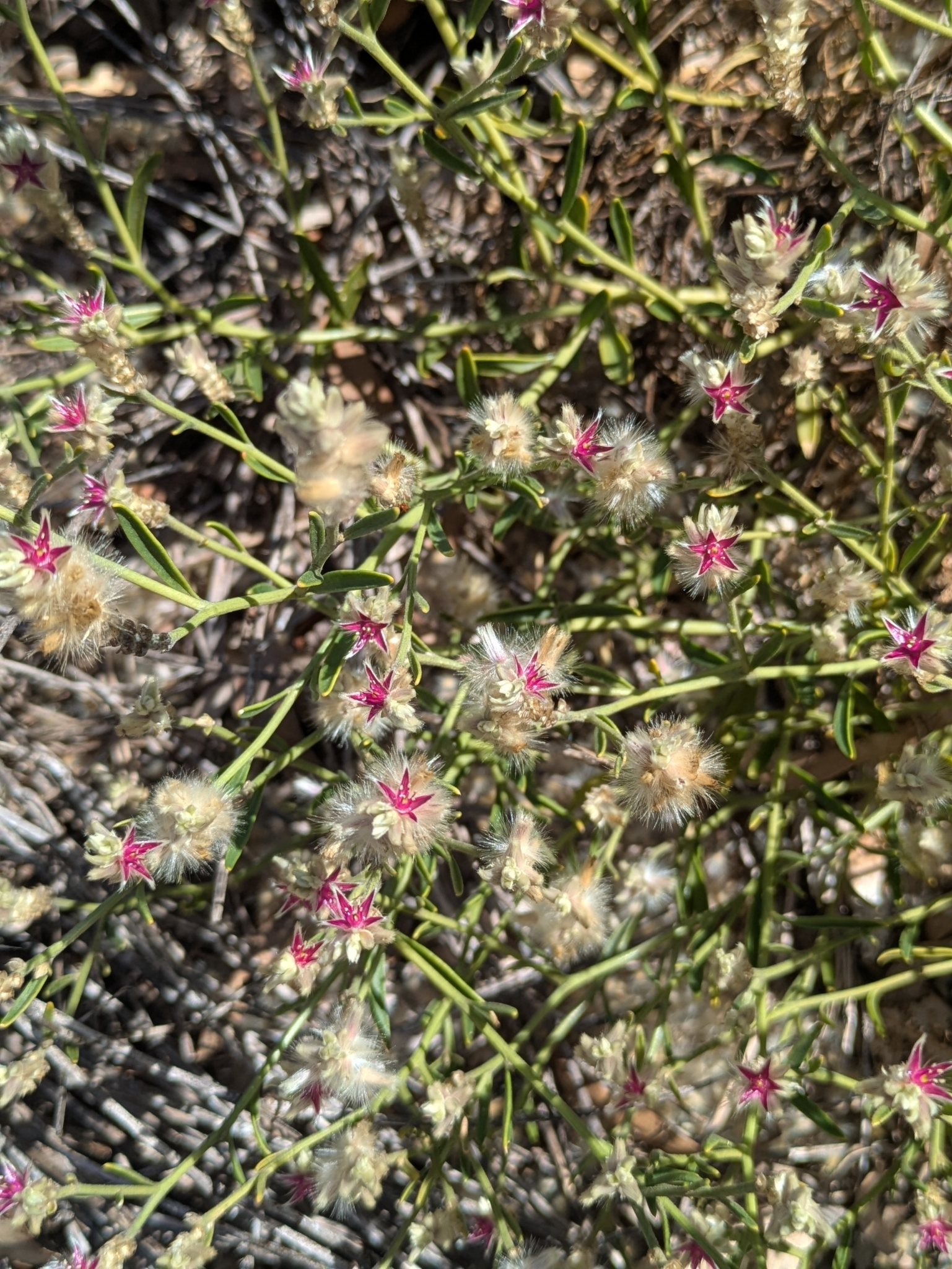

== See also ==
- List of Ptilotus species
