= Koordarrie =

Pastoral lease in Western Australia

Coordinates: 22.296°S 115.038°E

Location in Western Australia

Koordarrie Station, often referred to as Koordarrie, is a pastoral lease that once operated as a sheep station but now operates as a cattle station.

It is located about 73 kilometres (45 mi) south of Onslow and 102 kilometres (63 mi) south east of Exmouth and in the Pilbara region of Western Australia.

Koordarrie occupies an area of 1,186 square kilometres (458 sq mi) and shares boundaries with Minderoo, Yanrey and Urala Stations. The property is composed of broad sandy plains with low dunes and alluvial clay plains that all make suitable grazing for stock.

The property was established prior to 1912 when it was owned by Joseph McGrath, Frederick Wright and Frederick Lapthorn, whose company ran it until 1915 when Lapthorn retired and the partnership was dissolved. McGrath retained possession of Kooordarrie until he died in 1922.

Albert King was manager of the property and in 1928 a total of 10,500 sheep were clipped during shearing, producing 202 bales of wool. In 1928 about 12,000 sheep were shorn. The 1936 shearing produced 123 bales from a flock of 7,000 sheep after a couple of poor seasons. King retired as manager in 1946 and was replaced by Bob Knowles. By 1949 Geoff French was managing the station when he left to run another nearby property, Warrambo.

In 1951 the McGrath family put the station up for auction. At the time it occupied an area of 316,538 acres (128,098 ha). The property was passed in at auction for £15,000 then sold privately for an undisclosed figure.

In early 1952 the property was struck by a freak storm, causing significant damage to the homestead and outbuildings. Michael Stroud and his family settled on the property shortly afterwards and the station manager, Mr. Wardell-Johnston, left Koordarrie in 1952 to take over Wooramel Station.

In 1978 the property was carrying 7,269 sheep and was estimated to be able to carry up to 24,000 sheep.

The homestead was later abandoned and the property was run as part of a neighbouring station since the early 1980s. Rory and Kristie de Pledge acquired Koordarrie and switched to cattle production. The property was running a herd of 4,000 droughtmaster cattle in 2013.

== See also ==
- List of pastoral leases in Western Australia
