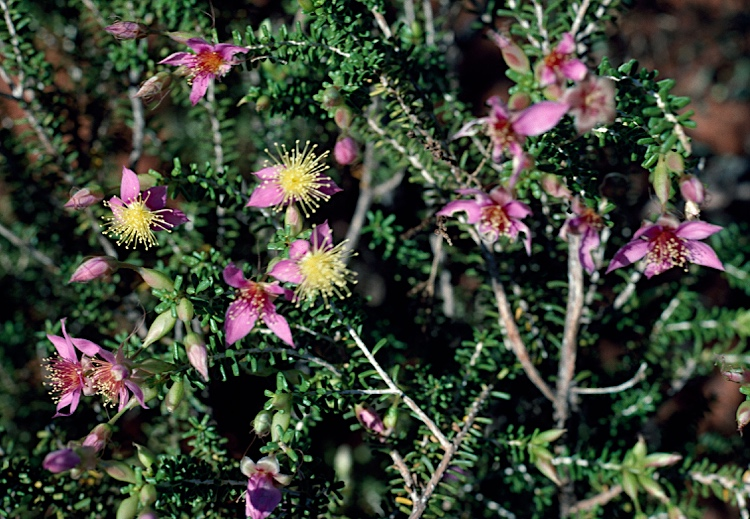

Scientific classification
- Kingdom: Plantae
- Clade: Tracheophytes
- Clade: Angiosperms
- Clade: Eudicots
- Clade: Rosids
- Order: Myrtales
- Family: Myrtaceae
- Genus: Calytrix
- Species: C. truncatifolia

Binomial name
- Calytrix truncatifolia Craven

= Calytrix truncatifolia =

Species of flowering plant

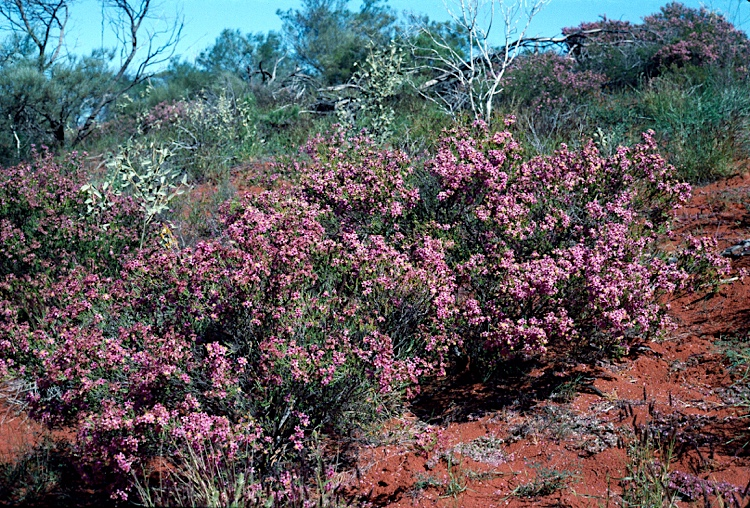
Habit 15 km (9.3 mi) south of Minilya

Calytrix truncatifolia is a species of flowering plant in the myrtle family Myrtaceae and is endemic to northern Western Australia. It is a glabrous shrub with linear, egg-shaped or elliptic leaves and pink to pinkish-purple flowers with about 90 to 150 stamens in several rows.

== Description ==
Calytrix truncatifolia is a glabrous shrub that typically grows to a height of 0.4–1.6 m (1 ft 4 in – 5 ft 3 in) and grows from the tips of the flowering stems. Its leaves are linear, egg-shaped with the narrower end towards the base, or elliptic, 2–5 mm (0.079–0.197 in) long, 0.75–1.2 mm (0.030–0.047 in) wide on a petiole 0.25–1.0 mm (0.0098–0.0394 in) long, with stipules up to 0.5 mm (0.020 in) long at the base of the petiole. The flowers are arranged singly or in several scattered groups on a peduncle 7–10 mm (0.28–0.39 in) long with broadly egg-shaped to more or less round lobes 4.5–6.0 mm (0.18–0.24 in) long. The floral tube is more or less oval, 11–17 mm (0.43–0.67 in) long and has ten ribs. The sepals are broadly egg-shaped to round, 3.5–5.25 mm (0.138–0.207 in) long and 3.8–5.0 mm (0.15–0.20 in) wide with an awn up to 14 mm (0.55 in) long. The petals are pink to pinkish-purple and there are 90 to 150 stamens in five rows with yellow filaments that become pinkish later. Flowering occurs from June to September.

== Taxonomy ==
Calytrix truncatifolia was first formally described in 1987 by Lyndley Craven in the journal Brunonia from specimens collected by Alex George about 11 km (6.8 mi) east of Giralia Station Gorge in 1960. The specific epithet (truncatifolia) means 'truncated-leaved'.

== Distribution and habitat ==
This species of Calytrix grows in red sand on sand dunes in the Exmouth Gulf district to Shark Bay in the Coolgardie and Yalgoo bioregions of northern Western Australia.

== Conservation status ==
Calytrix truncatifolia is listed as "not threatened" by the Government of Western Australia Department of Biodiversity, Conservation and Attractions.
