= Marrilla =

Pastoral lease in Western Australia

Coordinates: 22.972°S 114.46°E

Location in Western Australia

Marrilla Station, often referred to as Marrilla, is a pastoral lease that operates as a sheep station.

It is located about 73 kilometres (45 mi) north east of Coral Bay and 130 kilometres (81 mi) south east of Exmouth in the Gascoyne region of Western Australia.

Marrilla occupies an area of 1,328 square kilometres (513 sq mi) and shares boundaries with Giralia, Yanrey, Nyang, Winning, Bullara and Cardabia Stations. The station is composed of two blocks, one on the eastern side and one to the west meeting at a single point in the middle. The eastern portion is made up of sand dunes and sandy plains, the western block is made up of low hills and plains that support spinifex and bluebush. The property is capable of supporting flock of 13,100 sheep in a good season.

In 1934 the property was owned by the Marilla Station Company, a partnership between Amedio Ferdinand Marchetti and Hercules Carl Lingstone. The partnership was dissolved in 1934 with Lingstone retaining ownership of the property. Marrilla was placed up for auction in 1935; it was advertised as having an area of 161,000 acres (65,154 ha) and was stocked with 12,000 sheep. It had been broken in ten paddocks with 120 miles (193 km) of fencing and was watered by seven windmills.

In 1953 Marrilla was on the market again, along with the Tanda lease; together they occupied an area of 261,000 acres (105,623 ha) and were stocked with 4,000 sheep.

A bushfire started at Marrilla in 2011 and burned toward Yanrey Station. A bushfire alert saying the fire threatened lives and properties was issued. It was contained three days later after burning through a total area of 1,800 square kilometres (695 sq mi).

== See also ==
- List of pastoral leases in Western Australia
