= Sof Forrest =

Australian actress

- Born: Sophia Forrest; 1994 or 1995 (age 31–32)
- Education: St Hilda's Anglican School for Girls; Western Australian Academy of Performing Arts
- Occupation: Actor
- Years active: 2014–present
- Notable work: Love Child; Barons
- Spouse: Zara Zoe (m. 2024)
- Parents: Andrew Forrest; Nicola Forrest

Sophia Forrest (born 1994 or 1995) is an Australian actor.

== Early life ==
Sof Forrest 1994 or 1995. They are the child of Andrew and Nicola Forrest. They attended St Hilda's School in Perth and graduated from the Western Australian Academy of Performing Arts (WAAPA).

== Career ==
Forrest played the role of Debbie Hampshire in Love Child, joining the cast for season four. In 2022 she played the role of Dani in Barons and, on stage in 2024, that of Tessa Ensler in the one-hander Prima Facie with Perth's Black Swan State Theatre Company.

Forrest was nominated for Most Popular New Talent at the 2018 Logie Awards for their role in the Network 10 TV series Love Child.

Forrest cited Emma D'arcy, Liv Hewson, and Bella Ramsey as inspirations when they came out as nonbinary. They particularly said Ramsey had "that kind of self-awareness and acceptance and intelligence at that age. It took me 24 years to realise I was gay, and 28 to figure out what my gender was and how to feel comfortable with my body."

== Personal life ==
In April 2022, it was announced by Forrest that they were engaged to Zara Zoe. They had met during production of Ride Like a Girl in 2018. Their wedding took place at Minderoo Station in 2024.

== Filmography ==
=== Television ===
Year	Title	Role	Notes
2017	Love Child	Debbie	10 episodes
2021	Wentworth: The Fall Girl	Anna Highmore	Podcast series, 8 episodes
2022	Bali 2002	Natalia Goold	4 episodes
2022	Home and Away	Tegan Osbourne	4 episodes
2023	Barons	Dani Kirk	8 episodes
2023	The Claremont Murders	Amanda Spiers	Miniseries, 2 episodes

=== Film ===
Year	Title	Role	Notes
2014	The Water Diviner	Edith	Feature film
2016	Riptide	Rae	Short film
2018	Aquaman	Fisherman Princess	Feature film
2018	Reaching Distance	Tiff	
2019	Ride Like a Girl	Cathy Payne	Feature film
2022	Seriously Red	Betty	Feature film

== Theatre ==
Year	Title	Role	Notes
2014	Away	Meg	WAAPA
2014	The Mill on the Floss	Maggie Tulliver	WAAPA
2015	13	Holly	WAAPA
2015	Marat/Sade	Ensemble	WAAPA
2015	The Good Doctor	The Doctor	WAAPA
2015	Much Ado About Nothing	Ursula	WAAPA
2016	A Tale of Two Cities	Marquise De Sant Evremonde	WAAPA
2016	Les Liaisons Dangereuses	Cecile de Volanges	WAAPA
2016	Coriolanus	First Citizen	WAAPA
2017	Let the Right One In	Eli	Heath Ledger Theatre, Perth with Black Swan State Theatre Company
2019	The Torrents	Gwynne	Heath Ledger Theatre, Perth, Sydney Opera House with Black Swan State Theatre Company & STC
2024	Prima Facie	Tessa Ensler	Black Swan State Theatre Company
