= Cane River (Western Australia) =

River in Western Australia

Coordinates: 21°32′54″S 115°22′45″E

Location
- Country: Australia

Physical characteristics
- Source
  - location: Hamersley Range
  - elevation: 382 m (1,253 ft)
- Mouth
  - location: Indian Ocean
  - elevation: sea level
- Length: 168 km (104 mi)
- Basin size: 2,290 km^{2} (880 sq mi)
- Discharge
  - average: 62 GL/a (69 cu ft/s)

The Cane River is a river in the Pilbara region of Western Australia. With its headwaters rising west of the Hamersley Range, the river flows in a north-westerly direction through the Cane River Conservation Park and over the Onslow Coastal Plain, and eventually discharges into the Indian Ocean near Yardie Landing approximately 35 kilometres (22 mi) north-east of Onslow.

The river is considered to be dendritic with no major tributaries; numerous wells exist within the catchment area. The river has one large permanent pool, Jabaddar Pool, which is located downstream from the North West Coastal Highway.

The mouth of the river is a largely unmodified estuary that works as a function of tidal energy. The estuary covers a total area of 18 square kilometres (7 sq mi) that is mostly saltmarsh but with a small colony of mangroves.

In 1866 explorer Harry Venn, who later was a member of the Forrest Ministry, named the river after Charles Cane, a member of Venn's expedition.

The waters have an average salinity of 90 milligrams per litre (3.3×10^{−6} lb/cu in) and turbidity of 335 NTU.

Cane River has a large delta that is situated within the boundaries of Peedamulla Station. The river delta had become degraded as a result overgrazing particularly prior to 1970 when the station was running 100,000 head of sheep.
