= Andrew Forrest =

Australian mining businessman and team principal (born 1961)

Dr Andrew Forrest AO
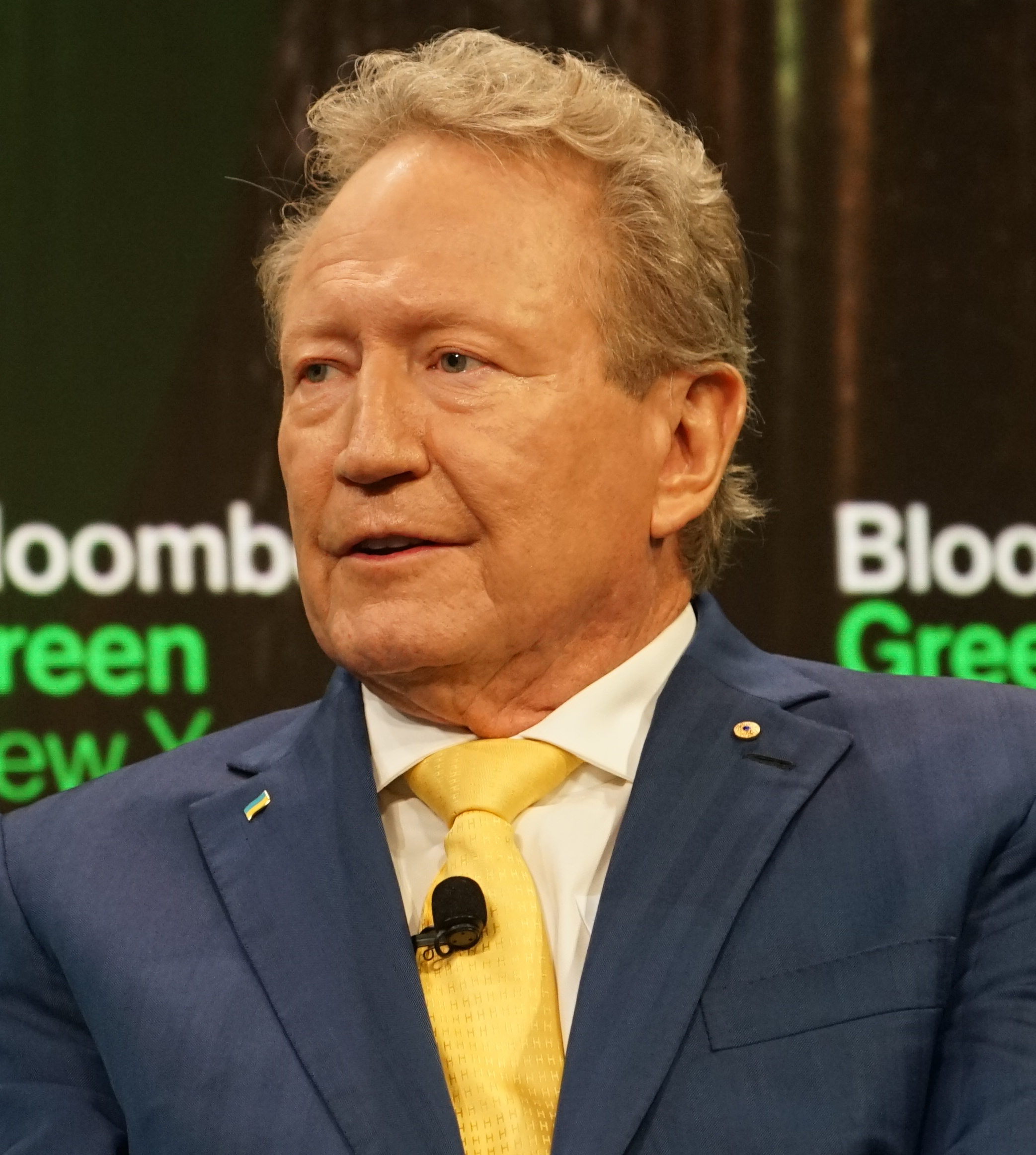
- Forrest in 2025
- Born: John Andrew Henry Forrest; 18 November 1961 (age 64); Perth, Western Australia, Australia
- Education: School of the Air; Christ Church Grammar School; Hale School; University of Western Australia
- Occupations: Executive chairman, Fortescue
- Spouse: Nicola Forrest (m. 1991; sep. 2023)
- Children: 4
- Relatives: Mervyn Forrest (grandfather); David Forrest (great-grandfather); John Forrest (great-great uncle); Alexander Forrest (great-great uncle)
- Awards: Officer of the Order of Australia; Australian Sports Medal; Centenary Medal

John Andrew Henry Forrest AO (born 18 November 1961), nicknamed Twiggy, is an Australian businessman. He is best known as the founder and current executive chairman of mining company Fortescue, one of Australia's largest companies. He also serves as founder of the Fortescue Zero Racing team.

With an assessed net worth of A$33.29 billion according to the Financial Review Rich List 2023, Forrest was ranked as the second richest Australian. The Australian Financial Review named him the richest person in Australia in 2008.

Forrest holds a Doctor of Philosophy (PHD) in Marine Ecology.

== Early life ==
John Andrew Henry Forrest was born on 18 November 1961 in Perth, Western Australia, the youngest of three children of Judith (née Fry) and Donald Forrest. His father, grandfather (Mervyn), and great-grandfather (David) were all managers of Minderoo Station, which David had established in 1878 with his brothers, Alexander and John. John, Alexander, David, and Mervyn were all members of parliament for periods, with John serving as Western Australia's first premier. Forrest's early years were spent at Minderoo, located in the Pilbara region south of Onslow. Minderoo was owned by the Forrest family until it was sold in 1998 by his father. Forrest bought back the property in 2009.

Forrest was educated at Onslow Primary School and through the School of the Air before moving to Perth to attend Christ Church Grammar School and then Hale School. He stuttered as a child, which is how he came to develop a relationship with Ian Black, whose Aboriginal father, Scotty, became Forrest's mentor. Forrest went on to the University of Western Australia where he majored in economics and politics.

== Career ==
=== Anaconda Nickel ===
After graduating, Forrest worked as a stockbroker at the brokerage houses Kirke Securities and Jacksons. He became the founding CEO of Anaconda Nickel in 1993, after buying a stake in the company. However, in 2001 he was ousted as CEO when the company almost collapsed. US bondholders received $0.26 for each dollar of debt in the restructuring. The company's shares fell by 89% before it was taken over by Glencore and renamed Minara Resources.

=== Fortescue ===
In April 2003, he took control of Allied Mining and Processing, which had rights to iron ore in the Pilbara, and renamed it Fortescue Metals Group (FMG). He remains a major shareholder of FMG, through his private company, The Metal Group.

One of Forrest's initial mines in the Pilbara produced and shipped $50 billion worth in iron ore, without providing compensation or receiving permission from the Yindjibarndi people to carry out mining on their land. The operations in the area destroyed about 250 cultural and sacred sites.

Fortescue made its first iron ore shipment to China in May 2008. Fortescue increased its capacity to 155 million tonnes per annum through a $9.2 billion expansion in 2014. Since then, the company has grown to possess three times the tenements of its nearest rival in Western Australia's iron ore rich Pilbara region. Fortescue holds major deposits at Mount Nicholas, Christmas Creek, Cloudbreak, and Tongolo. In 2007, he took an interest and a directorship in Niagara Mining Limited, renamed Poseidon Nickel Limited, which had in 2006 acquired from WMC the Windara nickel deposits near Laverton, Western Australia.

Forrest described the Gillard government proposed Minerals Resource Rent Tax (MRRT) as "economic vandalism" and a "mad dog's breakfast" that would drive up foreign resource ownership. He stated he would challenge it in the High Court as being unconstitutional, as it discriminates against states, and fails to appropriately capture big producers BHP Billiton and Rio Tinto. WA premier Colin Barnett has stated the state government would back constitutional action, admitting the tax had been suggested to him as a "sovereign risk". He was highly critical of the government's expenditure of $38M on an advertising campaign, that was not approved using the usual processes, as it had to "counter mining industry 'spin' about the resources super profits tax".

The former treasurer Wayne Swan said the big miners would pay at least A$2 billion tax, and wrote to the head of BDO Accounting, who modelled the claims Forrest used, noting they were "utterly unrealistic" and riddled with errors. Treasury concurred that they would be unable to release the assumptions underpinning its forecasts, as they were based on confidential information provided by the big miners. Gillard struck a deal with BHP Billiton, Rio Tinto and Xstrata to develop the MRRT. Independent MP Andrew Wilkie requested the government take Forrest's mining tax grievance to heart.

In August 2021, it was announced that Forrest would receive a $2.4 billion dividend on Fortescue's record profit.

=== Tattarang ===
Tattarang is the holding company for the Forrest family's private business interests. Tattarang invests in a diverse range of businesses across agri-food, energy, health technology, property, resources, and lifestyle. The group is made up of several business divisions: Fiveight, Harvest Road, Squadron Energy, Tenmile, Wyloo Metals, Z1Z, and Akubra.

=== Global Rapid Rugby ===
Following SANZAAR's decision to reduce the number of Super Rugby teams for 2018, the Australian Rugby Union (now Rugby Australia) announced in August 2017 that Perth-based rugby team Western Force would be one of the teams cut from the 2018 competition. In the following month, Forrest announced that he would create a new tournament called the Indo Pacific Rugby Championship which would include the Western Force and five other teams from the Indo-Pacific region. For the 2018 season, the competition was launched as World Series Rugby, played as a series of exhibition matches as the precursor to a wider Asia-Pacific competition planned for 2019.

The competition was rebranded in November 2018 as Global Rapid Rugby. A season of fourteen matches was played in 2019. The 2020 Global Rapid Rugby season was cancelled due to the COVID-19 pandemic after only one completed round of competition.

=== Cattle industry ===
After buying back the family property, Minderoo Station in 2009 Forrest acquired the adjoining properties, Nanutarra and Uaroo Stations in 2014, increasing his total pastoral holdings in the Pilbara to 7,300 square kilometres (2,819 sq mi). In August 2015 he acquired both Brick House Station and Minilya Station for an estimated A$10 million, bringing his total pastoral holdings to over 10,000 square kilometres (3,861 sq mi).

In 2020, Forrest acquired both Quanbun and neighbouring property, Jubilee Downs, in the Kimberley region of Western Australia for over A$30 million.

=== Allied Medical ===
In 2005, a medical equipment distribution company called Allied Medical was spun out of Fortescue Metals Group. Forrest was a director of the company. In June 2011, Allied Medical, of which Forrest owned a 46 percent stake in, was acquired by biotechnology company BioMD. Forrest retained an approximate 17–18 percent stake in the combined company, Allied Healthcare Group, after the takeover. Allied Healthcare Group eventually became structural heart company Anteris Technologies.

=== Defence industry ===
In 2022, Forrest's Tattarang investment vehicle bought 8% of Australian Defence shipbuilder Austal. Soon after Forrest became the dominant shareholder of the company, owning 15% of the shares by August 2022, and 19.9% by May 2024.

== Other roles ==
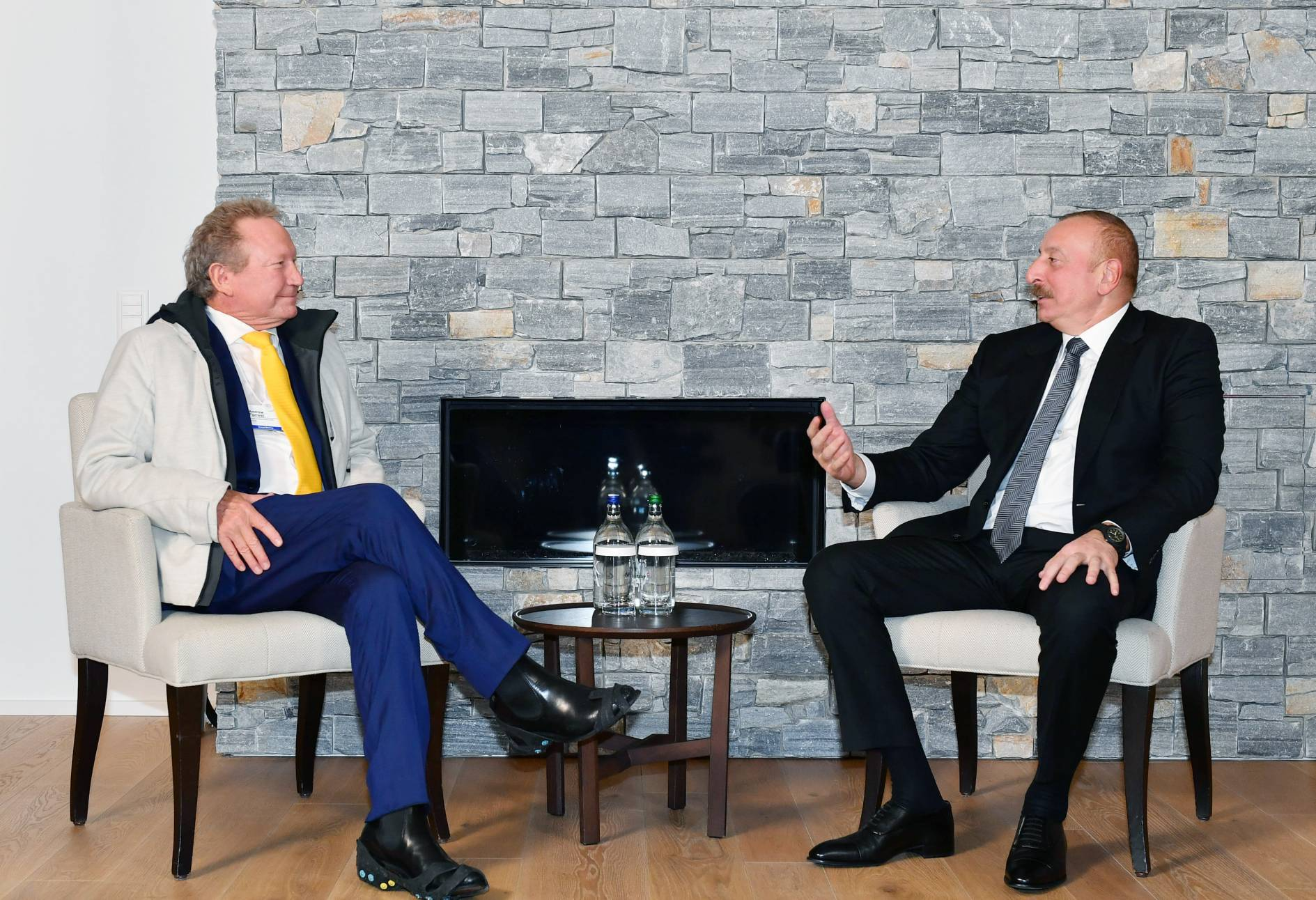
Forrest with Azerbaijan's President Ilham Aliyev in Davos, Switzerland, 17 January 2023

Forrest is an adjunct professor at the Chinese Southern University and a fellow of the Australasian Institute of Mining & Metallurgy. He is a former director of Australia's Export Finance and Insurance Corporation and the Chamber of Minerals and Energy of Western Australia, and former chairman of Athletics Australia.

He has addressed the Queensland University of Technology, and Christians in the Marketplace. He gave the 2020 Boyer Lecture to outline a case for hydrogen energy and ways to manage human impacts on the oceans.

== Environment ==
In 2021, he pledged to eliminate nearly all carbon emissions from Fortescue's operations by 2030, investing heavily in solar and wind power, battery-powered transport, and green hydrogen technologies. Forrest has promoted the use of green ammonia as a carbon-free shipping fuel, launching the Green Pioneer, the first cargo ship partially powered by this technology. He regularly travels internationally to promote renewable solutions, meeting with scientists and world leaders, and has publicly challenged climate change denial, including statements by US President Donald Trump. His advocacy stems from both environmental concerns, shaped by his Ph.D. studies in ocean ecology, and his belief in the economic viability of renewable energy.

Forrest is a critic of net-zero emissions targets and has called on the world "to walk away from this proven fantasy [of] net zero 2050 and adopt real zero 2040". Real zero means to completely eliminate fossil fuels by replacing them with zero-carbon alternatives. Forrest has committed US$6.2 billion to Fortescue's plan to achieve real zero by 2030.

Whilst Andrew Forrest has made pledges, and has made criticisms of others, no other Australian (except Gina Rinehart) has caused more damage to the environment than Andrew Forrest.

Forrest has been an advocate for the environment. He told Time magazine that fossil-fuel executives are the "culprits" and an impediment to the transition to greener fuels. As the chief executive of Fortescue, he is leading an effort to go to green hydrogen and build more renewable energy projects. Part of his effort includes urging China to decarbonize its shipping industry. “I need China to really lean forward on the International Maritime Organization proposal to trend itself to go green,” Forrest said Tuesday during a panel discussion at a World Economic Forum event in Dalian, China. “There’s huge vested political interest in the United States because they don’t want to see the world’s shipping industry go green.”

== Philanthropy ==
Andrew and Nicola Forrest made The Giving Pledge in 2013, promising to give away at least half of their wealth to charity. They stated:

"We hope to help empower individuals and families currently suffering the despair of poverty, slavery and the lack of opportunity for themselves and their children. We feel that if we all do whatever we can with whatever we have, large or small, then each of us will help make our world a more equitable and positive environment for others to thrive in."

— Andrew and Nicola Forrest, February 2013

=== Indigenous Australians ===
After stepping down as chief executive officer of FMG, Forrest noted that he had been spending more than 50% of his time on Indigenous philanthropy. Forrest became an ambassador for the Australian Indigenous Education Foundation. Encouraged by the philanthropy of the Rockefeller Group, Warren Buffett, and Melinda and Bill Gates, Andrew and Nicola Forrest established the Australian Children's Trust in 2001.

Through the influence of Scotty Black, Forrest started the GenerationOne project, with assistance from James Packer and Kerry Stokes, who each donated A$2 million, along with the support of their respective media stations, Channel 9 and Channel 7. GenerationOne and the Australian Children's Trust help to create sustainable solutions on addressing social disadvantage. With Kevin Rudd, Forrest launched the Australian Employment Covenant, that campaigned for businesses to hire Indigenous Australians, as they could "add value" to Australian businesses because they were "professional and reliable and wonderful" and that there is no reason for Indigenous disparity. GenerationOne ran a series of television advertisements privately funded by Forrest, Packer and Stokes. Between 2008 and 2011, Forrest obtained 253 business signatories to his covenant. With Rudd, Forrest planned to employ 50,000 Aboriginal people. As the two-year deadline approached, estimates put the number of Indigenous job placements under the scheme at around 2,800, well short of the original goal.

Forrest is opposed to welfare dependency for Indigenous Australians. He has recounted stories of young Aboriginal girls in the Pilbara offering men sex for cigarettes, leading to five indigenous women from the region collectively lodging a complaint with the Human Rights and Equal Opportunity Commission that Forrest's comment was racist and vilified the community. Forrest has been publicly accused of engaging in questionable methods of land acquisition, and has had accusations levelled at his company for failing Indigenous trainees at FMG's vocational training centre in Port Hedland.

In 2013 Forrest was chosen to lead an Australian Government review into Indigenous employment and training programs. Delivered on 1 August 2014 with 27 recommendations, the review proposed the creation of the Cashless Welfare Card.

Andrew Forrest, through his founding of Fortescue Metals Group (FMG) and his pastoral interests under the Minderoo Group, has been engaged in long-running disputes with Traditional Owner groups in Western Australia’s Pilbara region, most notably the Yindjibarndi and Thalanyji peoples. The conflict with the Yindjibarndi began in the early 2010s, when FMG developed the Solomon Hub iron-ore mine on Yindjibarndi country without reaching an Indigenous Land Use Agreement with the recognised native title holders. In July 2017 the Federal Court of Australia recognised the Yindjibarndi people’s exclusive native title rights over approximately 2,700 square kilometres of land, including areas of the Solomon Hub. FMG’s subsequent appeal was dismissed, and in May 2020 the High Court refused the company’s application for special leave to appeal, making the ruling final. Following this, the Yindjibarndi Aboriginal Corporation launched a compensation claim—valued at up to A$1.8 billion—for economic, cultural and spiritual loss resulting from mining undertaken without their consent. The case, which continues to be heard in the Federal Court, is viewed as one of Australia’s most significant tests of native title compensation and has highlighted deep divisions within the Yindjibarndi community, partly due to the emergence of a breakaway group that engaged directly with FMG.

Forrest has also faced opposition from the Thalanyji people regarding development plans on Minderoo Station, his pastoral lease along the Ashburton River, a sacred site in Thalanyji Country believed to be home to the ancestral water serpent Warnamankura. In 2017 Forrest’s company sought approval under Western Australia’s Aboriginal Heritage Act to construct a series of “upside-down leaky weirs” and granite quarries along the river. The WA Minister for Aboriginal Affairs rejected the application in 2019, citing the site’s cultural significance. Forrest appealed, and in August 2024 the Supreme Court ruled that the State Administrative Tribunal had made a procedural error, sending the matter back for rehearing in 2025. The dispute reflects broader tensions between agricultural and environmental development and the protection of Aboriginal heritage sites, particularly in the wake of national debate following the destruction of the Juukan Gorge caves in 2020.

=== Slavery and human trafficking ===
Forrest's daughter, Grace volunteered at an orphanage in Nepal and discovered the children she had looked after had been trafficked to be sex slaves in the Middle East. This distressed Grace and motivated her father to act. Grace, aged 21 years, said at a 2014 interfaith meeting held at the Vatican, "I feel like a puppet for hundreds of thousands of girls who are voiceless – if I can stand for them, that is what I'm here to do."

Forrest established the Walk Free Foundation in 2010 to fight modern slavery. In 2013 the organisation launched the Global Slavery Index ranking 162 countries "based on a combined measure of three factors: estimated prevalence of modern slavery by population, a measure of child marriage, and a measure of human trafficking in and out of a country". The Index estimates there are 29 million slaves worldwide, roughly half in India and Pakistan. In January 2014, Forrest announced a deal with Pakistan to do away with more than two million slaves in return for cheap coal.

Forrest founded the Global Freedom Network that the Pope, the Archbishop of Canterbury, and the Grand Imam of al-Azhar lead. The Global Freedom Network works to stop all religious faiths from using organisations involved with slavery in their supply chain.

When I heard the news [that all parties had agreed to the venture] I have to admit I became emotional. This is going to change everything. This is set up like a high-achieving, measurement-driven, totally target-oriented company, it's like a hard-edged business. We are out to defeat slavery, we are not out to feel good. This is our mission. You see the complete hopelessness in the eyes [of enslaved people]. It’s like I’m stuck, I will never get help, I am dirt. Then you know that you can’t rest until you free them.

— Andrew Forrest, interviewed in 2014

In 2014 Andrew and Grace Forrest attended a meeting held in the Vatican, being a Joint Religious Leaders Declaration Against Modern Slavery. The anti-slavery declaration was signed by Pope Francis, Mata Amritanandamayi, Justin Welby, Thích Nhất Hạnh, K. Sri Dhammananda, David Rosen, Ecumenical Patriarch Bartholomew, Abraham Skorka, Mohamed Ahmed El-Tayeb, Mohammad Taqi al-Modarresi, Basheer Hussain al-Najafi, and Omar Abboud – religious leaders representing forms of Christianity, Judaism, Islam, Hinduism and Buddhism. Welby, the Archbishop of Canterbury, urged consumers to demand more information about whether forced labour was involved in goods they bought.

=== Other philanthropic interests ===
As of September 2007, Forrest had injected A$90 million into his children's charity. Philanthropic activity has included gifts to his alma mater, Hale School; participation in the St Vincent de Paul Society CEO sleepouts; and a gift from the proceeds of the sale of 5,000 tonnes (5,500 short tons) of iron ore to the Chinese earthquake relief effort. In October 2013 it was announced that Forrest was to donate A$65 million towards higher education in Western Australia. At the time the sum was believed to be the highest philanthropic donation in Australia, with most going toward funding scholarships.

The Minderoo Foundation, Forrest's private foundation, was renamed as the Minderoo Group is to be expanded to include higher education contributions. The foundation has given A$270 million through the foundation since 2001. In 2014, Andrew and Nicola Forrest pledged A$65 million over ten years through the Minderoo Foundation, establishing the Forrest Research Foundation to offer scholarships to students pursuing a PhD at a Western Australian university. In 2017 Forrest donated A$400 million to medical research and social causes, and in 2019 donated a further A$655 million to expand the existing work of the Minderoo Foundation in areas including cancer research, early childhood development, ocean health, and eliminating modern slavery, the largest ever living donation by any Australian philanthropist.

== Lawsuit against Meta ==
Forrest has been in legal dispute with Meta Platforms (owner of Facebook and Instagram) over fraudulent cryptocurrency scam advertisements that used his name and likeness without permission, with his image appearing in approximately 230,000 scam ads from 2019 to 2025. In September 2021, Forrest filed a civil lawsuit against Meta in California. In June 2024, a judge rejected Meta's motion to dismiss the case, ruling that Meta had not conclusively demonstrated that Section 230 of the Communications Decency Act provided immunity, finding that questions remained about whether Meta's ad tools contributed to the content of the ads or merely served as neutral tools.

Forrest filed a separate criminal suit in Western Australia in 2022 but the Commonwealth Director of Public Prosecutions decided not to continue with the prosecution and the case was discontinued in 2024. In 2019, Forrest wrote an open letter calling on "governments around the world to update their regulatory and legislative frameworks to ensure society is protected from the harm Facebook facilitates by allowing scammers to advertise on its platform". In 2025, he also called on the Australian government to "require digital platforms to operate through an Australian legal entity and be subject to Australian regulations and our legal system."

== Recognition and honours ==
Forrest has an Australian Centenary Medal, Australian Sports Medal, was awarded the 2017 Western Australian of the Year Award, and the 2018 EY Entrepreneur of the Year Alumni Social Impact Award.

In 2017 Forrest was appointed an Officer of the Order of Australia for distinguished service to the mining sector, to the development of employment and business opportunities, as a supporter of sustainable foreign investment, and to philanthropy.

In 2019 Forrest was awarded a PhD in Marine Science from the University of Western Australia, and has a strong interest in maintaining the health of the oceans.

== Personal life ==
In 1991, Forrest married Nicola Maurice who grew up on a farm in central western New South Wales; the family raised sheep and cattle and grew wheat. They have four children, including Sophia. In July 2023, after 31 years of marriage, Andrew and Nicola announced their separation.

Forrest purchased the 58.2-metre (191 ft) superyacht Pangaea in 2018. Built by US shipyard Halter Marine in 1999, the yacht is registered in Montego Bay, Jamaica. Forrest turned the yacht into an ocean research vessel for the Minderoo Foundation, with multiple laboratories and specialist research equipment installed since its purchase.

In December 2015, Forrest purchased the heritage-listed Tukurua mansion in Cottesloe for $16 million. The Forrest family housed refugees at the home for a period of time after the purchase. A restoration and development of additional buildings was completed in 2019. In 2022, Forrest purchased the nearby heritage-listed Le Fanu House.

Forrest is a Christian.

=== Net worth ===
Year	Financial Review Rich List		Forbes Australia's 50 Richest	
Year	Rank	Net worth (A$)	Rank	Net worth (US$)
2011	3 ▲	$6.18 billion ▲		
2012	4 ▼	$5.89 billion ▼		
2013	9 ▼	$3.66 billion ▼		
2014	7 ▲	$5.86 billion ▲		
2015	9 ▼	$2.83 billion ▼		
2016	8 ▲	$3.33 billion ▲		
2017	6 ▲	$6.84 billion ▲		
2018	8 ▼	$6.10 billion ▼		
2019	8	$7.99 billion ▲		
2020	2 ▲	$23.00 billion ▲		
2021	2	$27.25 billion ▲		
2022	2	$30.70 billion ▲		
2023	2	$33.29 billion ▲		
2024^{[note 1]}	8 ▼	$16.76 billion ▼		
2025	11 ▼	$12.68 billion ▼		

Legend
Icon	Description
Steady	Has not changed from the previous year
▲	Has increased from the previous year
▼	Has decreased from the previous year

== Notes ==
- ^1: Net worth was aggregated with Nicola Forrest, prior to 2024.
