= Nyang Station =

Pastoral lease in Western Australia

Coordinates: 23.031°S 115.04°E

Location in Western Australia

Nyang Station, often referred to as Nyang and previously known as Wogoola Station, is a pastoral lease that operates as a sheep station.

It is located about 130 kilometres (81 mi) east of Coral Bay and 150 kilometres (93 mi) south of Onslow in the Pilbara region of Western Australia.

Nyang occupies an area of 1,238 square kilometres (478 sq mi) and shares boundaries with Yanrey, Uaroo, Winning and Marrilla Stations.

The property was established as Wogoola Station in 1891 by a partnership between James Clark and Alexander Cameron. Cameron had previously owned Towera Station, which he had sold the same year. The name Wogoola is the Indigenous Australian name for a waterhole located a few hundred metres away from the homestead.

In 1951 the station was put up for auction again. The 354,840-acre (143,599 ha) property, carrying a flock of 6,300 sheep, attracted a highest bid of £10,000.

== See also ==
- List of ranches and stations
