= Peedamulla =

Pastoral lease in Western Australia

Coordinates: 21°50.719′S 115°37.595′E

- Location within Western Australia

General information
- Type: Station
- Location: 58 kilometres (36 mi) south east of Onslow, Pilbara, Western Australia

Western Australia Heritage Register
- Designated: 2 September 1998
- Reference no.: 4656

Peedamulla Station, often referred to as Peedamulla, is a pastoral lease that currently operates as a cattle station but once operated as a sheep station.

== Description ==
The homestead is located about 58 kilometres (36 mi) south east of Onslow and 75 kilometres (47 mi) south west of Pannawonica in the Pilbara region of Western Australia. The property adjoins the coastline and the town of Onslow. Peedamulla is the Indigenous Australian word meaning plenty water.

The Cane River runs through the property, with the entire river delta found within the station boundaries. The delta is severely degraded as a result of overgrazing. The majority of the property is composed of spinifex country with areas of cracking clays found on the eastern side.

== History ==
The Ashburton Land District was opened up for pastoral leases after the explorations of Francis Thomas Gregory in the 1860s.

The Peedamulla leases, originally known as Peedamullah, were taken over by Edmund and Archibald Burt in the early 1880s.

In 1922 the Burts put up a portion of the station for auction. A total of 220,000 acres (89,031 ha), of which 160,000 acres (64,750 ha) was fenced, was put on the market. The area included parts of the Cane River, including one permanent pool as well as five wells.

The 621,000-acre (251,310 ha) station was sold in 1928 for £60,000 carrying a flock of 30,000 to 35,000 sheep. The property was acquired by Messrs. Banard, Brandi, W. Montgomery and McManus, who had formed the Peedamulla Pastoral Company.

In 1930 the property was on the market again, advertised as having an area of 721,309 acres (291,903 ha) and stocked with 34,000 sheep. The property has an area of 605,000 acres (244,835 ha) enclosed in sheep proof fencing and subdivided into 32 paddocks equipped with 35 wells with windmills and troughs. In 1932 the property was in the hands of liquidators and still for sale. It was acquired by Cornelius McManus and W Montgomery later the same year.

In 1924 the area was struck by a cyclone, with 40 windmills being destroyed at Peedamulla. Drought followed, resulting in further stock losses.

Alexander Edward Hardie acquired Peedamulla in 1937 for £19,522. Firstly Hardie's son, Byron, managed the station then G. Herbert took over in 1942. Herbert later leased a part of Peedamulla which became Cane River Station. The Hardie family still owned the property in 1955 when it was managed by Arthur Roland.

By 1961 the landholding had been reduced down to 156,000 hectares (385,484 acres) following resumption of lands for the Onslow town water supply. A cyclone hit the same year followed by another in 1963 with both causing damage to the buildings and loss of livestock.

The Hardies sold the property in the 1970s to Moira and Neville MacDonald for A$70,000, then three years later the MacDonalds sold it to the Commonwealth Government, stocked with 28,000 sheep, to be used by Aboriginal people of the region.

The Parker family have managed the property since 1985 and have developed a joint venture with the Ashburton Aboriginal Corporation to use the property as a training centre for Aboriginal people of the Pilbara.

The homestead ruin has been assessed for heritage status due to the connection with the prominent Western Australian Burt family.

== See also ==
- List of ranches and stations
