= Boolaloo =

Pastoral lease in Western Australia

Coordinates: 22.583°S 115.872°E

Location in Western Australia

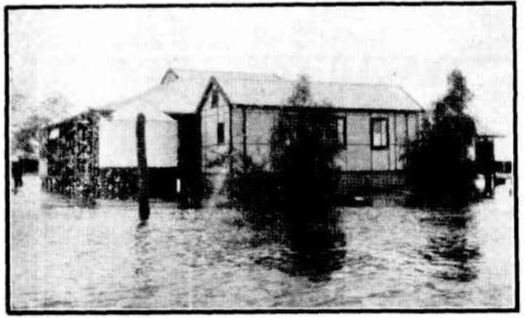
Boolaloo homestead during floods 1931

Boolaloo Station, commonly referred to as Boolaloo, is a pastoral lease that once operated as a sheep station but now operates as a cattle station in Western Australia.

It is situated about 115 kilometres (71 mi) south west of Pannawonica and 193 kilometres (120 mi) east of Exmouth in the Pilbara region. Adjoining properties include Mount Stuart to the east and Nanutarra Station to the south west. The Ashburton River flows through the property.

The station was established prior to 1892 by Mr. Young. Arthur St Aubyn Barrett-Lennard and his brother, who also owned Red Hill Station, acquired Boolaloo in 1909 from Thomas Frederick de Pledge. The partnership later dissolved and Arthur became the sole owner of the property.

By 1911 the property was stocked with 12,000 sheep. The flock size reduced to 7,000 in 1914 then to rose to 9,000 in 1915 and 10 15,000 in 1916.

The homestead, situated about 1 mile (2 km) from the Ashburton River, was flooded during heavy rains in 1931 when the river broke its banks.

== See also ==
- List of ranches and stations
