= Frederick Bedford =

Royal Navy officer and Governor of Western Australia (1838–1913)

Admiral Sir Frederick Bedford GCB GCVO
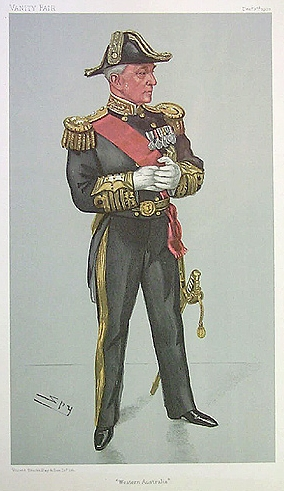
- Bedford as caricatured by Spy (Leslie Ward) in Vanity Fair, December 1903

14th Governor of Western Australia
- In office 24 March 1903 – 30 May 1909
- Monarch: Edward VII
- Premier: Walter James; Henry Daglish; Hector Rason; Newton Moore
- Preceded by: Sir Arthur Lawley
- Succeeded by: Sir Gerald Strickland

Personal details
- Born: 24 December 1838
- Died: 30 January 1913 (aged 74)

Military service
- Allegiance: United Kingdom
- Branch/service: Royal Navy
- Years of service: 1852–1903
- Rank: Admiral
- Commands: North America and West Indies Station; Cape of Good Hope Station
- Battles/wars: Crimean War; Mahdist War
- Awards: Knight Grand Cross of the Order of the Bath; Knight Grand Cross of the Royal Victorian Order

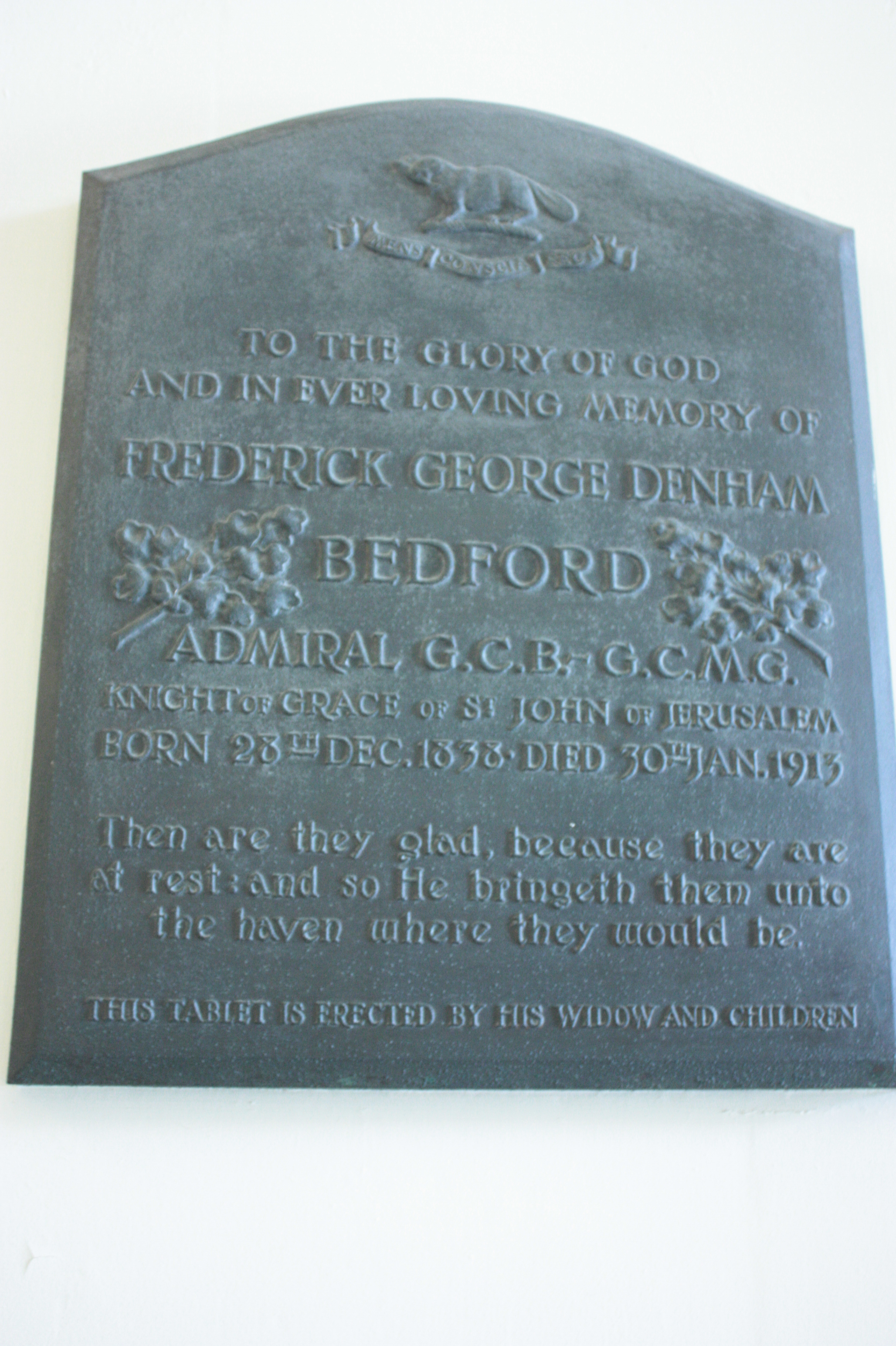
Memorial to Frederick George Denham Bedford, Greenwich Hospital Chapel

Admiral Sir Frederick George Denham Bedford, GCB, GCVO (24 December 1838 – 30 January 1913) was a senior Royal Navy officer and Governor of Western Australia from 24 March 1903 to 22 April 1909.

== Naval career ==
Bedford was born on 24 December 1838, and joined the Royal Navy in July 1852, at the age of 14. He saw early service in HMS Sampson and HMS Vulture, taking part in several of the operations during the Crimean War 1854–55. As a Commander he served in HMS Serapis when that ship took the Prince of Wales (later King Edward VII) on a tour of India in 1875. He was promoted to captain on 15 May 1876, and was flag captain in HMS Shah on the Pacific Station during action with a Peruvian ironclad in May 1877. From 1880 to 1883 he was engaged in administrative work as Captain of the Royal Naval College, Greenwich, but the following year he was back in command, this time as captain of the ironclad HMS Monarch. After a spell as captain of the cadet training ship HMS Britannia, he joined the Board of Admiralty as Junior Naval Lord in December 1889, serving until August 1892.

Bedford was appointed Commander-in-Chief, Cape of Good Hope and West Coast of Africa Station in 1892: in 1894, Bedford was involved in an action against Nana Olomu Chief of Benin. Brohomi was burnt down in 1894 by a combined force of the British Naval Brigade and the Niger Coast Protectorate Force under Bedford and the Consul-General Ralph Moor. It is believed over 500–600 slaves were freed during the operation. On 22 February 1895, a British naval force, under the command of Bedford at the behest of the Royal Niger Company, granted a royal charter by Queen Victoria in 1886, laid siege on Brass, the chief city of the Ljo people of Nembe in Nigeria's Niger Delta.

Bedford was back at the Admiralty as he was appointed Second Naval Lord in May 1895, serving as such until May 1899. He was promoted to vice-admiral on 10 May 1897.

In 1899 Bedford was appointed commander-in-chief of the North America and West Indies Station, serving with the flagship HMS Crescent. The squadron under his command visited Jamaica and Bermuda in February 1900. He held the North America post until 15 July 1902, when he was succeeded by Vice Admiral Sir Archibald Douglas, and left homebound with the Crescent.

Following the succession of King Edward VII, Bedford was advanced to Knight Grand Cross of the Order of the Bath (GCB) in the 1902 Coronation Honours published on 26 June 1902, and received the insignia in an investiture on board the royal yacht Victoria and Albert outside Cowes on 15 August 1902, the day before the fleet review held there to mark the coronation. Bedford took part in the review with the Crescent, before the ship was paid off. He was promoted to the rank of admiral on 3 October 1902. After his appointment as governor, he formally resigned from the Royal Navy on 30 May 1903.

== Governor of Western Australia ==
Bedford was announced as Governor of Western Australia in early January 1903, appointed later the same month, and formally took up the post on arriving there on 24 March 1903.

On 4 June 1907 he officiated at the opening of the Royal Fremantle Golf Club in Western Australia, but it was not until March 1909 that the complete 18 hole course was available.

Bedford acquired Globe Hill Station with Thomas Frederick de Pledge in 1909 for £35,000.

== Family ==
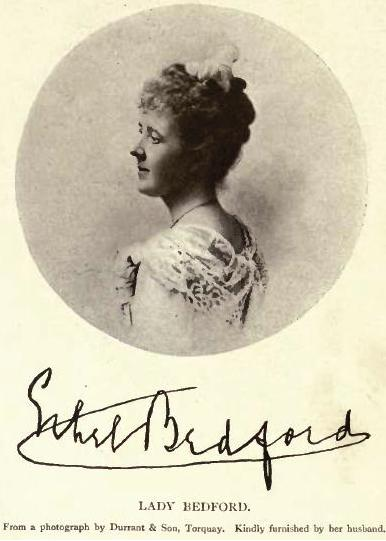
Lady Ethel Bedford by Durrant & Son

Bedford married Ethel Turner, daughter of E. R. Turner, of Ipswich, in 1880. Lady Bedford accompanied her husband and was mistress of Admiralty House in Halifax, Nova Scotia, until 1902. She took an interest in benevolent work, and frequently performed as a singer at concerts, for charitable purposes.

The couple's son was Vice Admiral Sir Arthur Edward Frederick Bedford, who married Miss Gladys Mort of Sydney, Australia. While residing at Easthampnett, their son Frederick, named after his grandfather, who had become a lieutenant in the Fleet Air Arm, was killed in action over St Pauls Bay, Malta on 21 February 1942, aged 22 years, and was buried in Capuccini Naval Cemetery in Kalkara, Malta.

== Legacy and memorials ==
Two suburbs of Perth are named after Bedford – Bedford (located in the City of Bayswater) and Bedfordale (located in the City of Armadale). Additionally, a pastoral lease in the Kimberley, Bedford Downs Station, is named after Bedford, as is nearby Mount Bedford.

A memorial to Bedford stands in the entrance lobby of the Chapel at Greenwich Hospital, London.

=== Affiliations ===
Bedford was affiliated with TS Bedford, a former unit of the Australian Navy Cadets.

== Publications ==
Bedford authored a publication entitled The Sailor's Pocket Book: a Collection of Practical Rules, Notes, and Tables. For the Use of the Royal Navy, the Mercantile Marine, and Yacht Squadrons. The book was first published in 1875. A 4th edition was published in 1885.

== Notes ==
Military offices
Preceded by Sir Charles Hotham	Junior Naval Lord; 1889–1892	Succeeded by Lord Walter Kerr
Preceded by Sir Henry Nicholson	Commander-in-Chief, Cape of Good Hope Station; 1892–1895	Succeeded by Sir Harry Rawson
Preceded by Lord Walter Kerr	Second Naval Lord; 1895–1899	Succeeded by Lord Walter Kerr
Preceded by Sir John Fisher	Commander-in-Chief, North America and West Indies Station; 1899–1902	Succeeded by Sir Archibald Douglas
Government offices
Preceded by Sir Arthur Lawley	Governor of Western Australia; 1903–1909	Succeeded by Sir Gerald Strickland
