= Minderoo Foundation =

Australian charity organisation

- Formation: 2001; 25 years ago
- Founder: Andrew Forrest; Nicola Forrest
- Headquarters: Perth, Western Australia, Australia
- Board chair: Allan Myers
- CEO: John Hartman
- Website: minderoo.org

The Minderoo Foundation, founded as the Australian Children's Trust in 2001, is an Australian charity organisation founded by Andrew and Nicola Forrest. It runs film production and support company Minderoo Pictures.

== History ==
In 2001, Andrew and Nicola Forrest established the Australian Children's Trust, which evolved into the Minderoo Foundation.

In 2017, the Forrests donated $400 million to the Minderoo Foundation, followed by another $520 million in 2020. In 2023, they donated $5 billion worth of Fortescue shares to the foundation, the largest single charitable donation in Australian history.

In October 2024, the Minderoo Foundation donated $30 million to the Western Australian Academy of Performing Arts. The school's Minderoo Centre for Performance Excellence at ECU City was subsequently named after the foundation. In December 2024, the foundation invested $100 million to seed Future Generation Women, a new women-focused fund by Future Generation. In July 2025, the Minderoo Foundation donated $3.3 million to Regional Arts WA and 20 organisations within the Regional Arts Network.

== Governance and description ==
In October 2022, chief executive Andrew Hagger left the foundation and John Hartman, who had been the foundation's chief investment officer, took on the role. Under Hartman, Minderoo adjusted its strategy to work on fewer issues, have an Australia-first approach and a stronger focus on working with other organisations.

A restructure of the foundation in April 2024 led to the axing of about 100 jobs and the consolidation of several international offices. In October 2024, the Forrests stepped down as co-chairs of the Minderoo Foundation but retained their board seats.

Allan Myers, who had been on the board since 2014, took over as chairperson.

== Minderoo Pictures ==
In October 2021, the foundation launched Minderoo Pictures, a company with "a mission to develop, produce and assist in the release of screen projects that inspire change". The company supported a feature fiction film focused on domestic violence, titled Life Could Be a Dream, released in Australia in 2026.
