= Australian Indigenous Education Foundation =

Non-profit organisation

- Founded: 2008; 18 years ago
- Founder: Andrew Penfold
- Headquarters: Australia
- Revenue: 30,662,988 Australian dollar (2024)
- Total assets: 164,655,757 Australian dollar (2024)
- Number of employees: 36 (2024, 2023)
- Website: www.aief.com.au

The Australian Indigenous Education Foundation (AIEF) is a non-profit organisation. AIEF provides scholarship funding for Indigenous students to complete Year 12 or tertiary school, with career support to help make a successful transition to employment.

The organisation is backed by some of Australia’s most influential business, media, philanthropic and community leaders, growing from one scholarship student in 2008, AIEF now supports over 1,500 young Indigenous people from over 400 communities in every state and territory of Australia.

== History ==
AIEF was established in 2008 to scale the work of the St Joseph’s College Indigenous Fund, which was also established by AIEF Executive Director Andrew Penfold AM in 2004 to fund boarding scholarships at the college for Indigenous students in financial need.

With the support of his wife, Michelle, Andrew was able to grow the program to work with schools around Australia, establishing AIEF, and awarding the first AIEF Scholarship in 2008.

Then Prime Minister Kevin Rudd agreed in 2008, to invest $20 million in AIEF on the condition that the amount was matched with private sector funding by 2028, creating a $40 million, equal joint venture between the Australian Government and the private sector. AIEF was able to leverage the investment to draw support from the private sector, exceeding the initial funding target in 2012.

== Programs ==
The AIEF Scholarship Program provides scholarships to Indigenous students to pursue their education at leading Australian schools and universities.

Students supported by the program access quality education in culturally inclusive environments, where they can develop the skills and confidence to fulfil their potential and make the most of their opportunities.

The AIEF Pathways Program complements the AIEF Scholarship Program by providing career support to ensure AIEF Scholarship Students make a transition from school or university to further studies or employment.

== The AIEF Compendium ==
In May 2015, then Prime Minister Tony Abbott launched AIEF’s resource for Australian boarding schools, the AIEF Compendium.

The AIEF Compendium of best practice for achieving successful outcomes with Indigenous students in Australian boarding schools draws on interviews, surveys and discussions with over 160 educators at more than 50 leading Australian schools to identify the critical factors influencing successful outcomes – Year 12 completion and career transitions – among Indigenous boarding students.

The Compendium was a two-year project undertaken by AIEF, with the support of funding through HSBC’s Future First program.

AIEF also established an interactive portal – ‘AIEF Compendium Online’, where education professionals can register to view and interact with the content of the Compendium.

== Organisation and Governance ==
The AIEF Scholarship Program and the AIEF Pathways Program are supported by the Australian Government, in collaboration with individual, philanthropic and corporate supporters from the private sector.

=== Patrons ===
AIEF is under the Patronage of some of Australia’s civic leaders.

- Her Excellency the Honourable Sam Mostyn AC, Governor-General of the Commonwealth of Australia (Patron-in-Chief)
- Professor The Honourable Dame Marie Bashir AD CVO
- Mr David Gonski AC

=== Board of Directors ===
AIEF is a non-profit public company limited by guarantee, governed by its Board of Directors, with the support of an appointed Investment Committee.

- Carlie Bender
- Rob Coombe
- Greg Cooper
- Emily Hill
- Helen McCabe
- Andrew Penfold AM (Executive Director)
- Michelle Penfold

=== Ambassadors ===
AIEF is supported by a large group of Ambassadors, who have achieved success and prominence in their respective fields and act as advocates for AIEF.

== Corporate and Foundational Partners ==
AIEF has partnered with businesses and philanthropic foundations to support scholarship funding, and provide opportunities to students and alumni, such as training, career exposure, and employment opportunities.

- Allens
- BHP
- Commonwealth Bank
- Crown Resorts Foundation
- Future Generation
- HSBC Bank Australia
- KPMG
- Qantas Airways
- SAP Australia
- Sky News Australia
- The Australian
- The Bill & Patricia Ritchie Foundation
- Minderoo Foundation
- Dick and Pip Smith Foundation
- The Ireland Funds Australia
