= Thomas Frederick de Pledge =

Thomas Frederick de Pledge (1867–1954) was an Australian pioneer and pastoralist.

The son of Reverend Joseph De Pledge, he was born in Durham in 1867. Educated at Aldenham in Hertfordshire, he left for Australia at age 18 aboard the Australind and disembarked at Fremantle. He set of for Bunbury and worked on a farm for less than a year then left for the Ashburton region. Working on a Minderoo Station for seven years for David Forrest and Septimus Burt he later moved to Globe Hill Station to work for McCrae and Harper, first of an overseer and then as a manager.

In 1897 de Pledge was appointed as manager at Yanrey Station by the estate of John Stuart. He bought the property in 1898 when it occupied an area of 270,000 acres (109,265 ha) and three years later acquired neighbouring properties; Yannangal and Yannaney. In 1909 he also acquired Globe Hill and incorporated it into Yanrey. At one stage Yanrey was the third largest property in the Ashburton District with a size of 876,892 acres (354,866 ha).

Frederick Bedford and De Pledge acquired Globe Hill Station in 1909 for £35,000.

De Pledge died in 1954 at age 87, leaving a widow and two daughters.
