= Nicola Forrest =

Australian philanthropist

Nicola Forrest AO
- Born: Nicola Maurice; 1960 or 1961 (age 65–66)
- Spouse: Andrew Forrest (m. 1991; sep. 2023)
- Children: 4, including Sophia Forrest

Nicola Forrest AO (née Maurice; born in 1960 or 1961) is an Australian philanthropist. She co-founded the philanthropic Minderoo Foundation, is co-owner of investment company Tattarang with Andrew Forrest, and the founder of the Coaxial Foundation and Coaxial Ventures.

== Life and career ==
Forrest was born Nicola Maurice in 1960 or 1961. Her parents were farmer Tony Maurice and artist Brooke Maurice. She has two older sisters and a younger brother. Forrest grew up on a farm in Spicers Creek, between Mudgee and Dubbo in central western New South Wales. Her family raised sheep and cattle and grew wheat. She went to a one-room, one-teacher primary school. While her sisters were sent to boarding school, Forrest's parent could not afford to do the same for her so she went to high school in Wellington. The family later moved and Forrest attended Frensham School from Year 10.

Forrest went to university at Canberra College of Advanced Education and graduated in 1981 with a Bachelor of Arts in secretarial studies, majoring in economics. She subsequently worked in publishing and stockbroking in Sydney, alternating between working and travelling. She also worked as a cook for a family in Yorkshire and had stints as a private cook for Susan Renouf and as a private secretary to Mary Fairfax. In the late 1980s, Forrest was a cook in a pub in Kynuna and later had a job in Europe with the United Nations.

In 1991, Nicola married Andrew Forrest who went on to lead the mining companies Anaconda Nickel and Fortescue Metals Group. Through Fortescue, the Forrests amassed an enormous amount of wealth and they became muiti-billionaires. They founded the Minderoo Foundation in 2001.

In 2008, Forrest was a delegate of the Australia 2020 Summit, helping shape the country's strategy on Indigenous Australia. Forrest sat on the board of arts event organiser Sculpture by the Sea from 2008 to 2010 and is a life governor of the organisation. She was also a member of the Black Swan State Theatre Company board and its chair from 2018 to 2021. Forrest is a patron of Impact100 WA, which aims to facilitate and increase philanthropy, and Rock Art Australia (formerly Kimberley Foundation Australia) which funds research and preservation of Aboriginal rock art. She is also a member of the Global Philanthropic Circle and the Prime Minister's Community Business Partnership. In 2023, she joined the board of Co-Impact, a gender equality foundation backed by the Minderoo Foundation.

Forrest and her husband made The Giving Pledge in 2013, promising to give away at least half of their wealth to charity. In 2017, they donated $400 million to the Minderoo Foundation followed by another $520 million in 2020. In 2023, they donated $5 billion worth of Fortescue shares to the foundation, the largest single charitable donation in Australian history. In October 2024, the Forrests stepped down as co-chairs of the Minderoo Foundation but retained their board seats.

In 2023, Forrest established Coaxial which consists of entities including the non-profit Coaxial Foundation and the Coaxial Ventures business arm. The Coaxial Foundation's mission is focused on early childhood education, community wellbeing and promoting gender equality. The foundation's initial project—Project Oasis—will seek to improve access to high quality early learning in areas with poor access to childcare. Coaxial Ventures will focus on business ventures and investments that can complement and help fund Forrest's philanthropic goals. In December 2024, Coaxial purchased the Terminus Hotel site in Fremantle. Philippa Watson was named the inaugural chief executive of Coaxial in March 2025. The Fremantle Trades Hall was purchased in April 2026 for use as the organisation's headquarters and as a community space. In October 2026, Forrest donated $125 million in cash and Fortescue shares worth $391 million from Coaxial Ventures to Coaxial Foundation.

== Personal life ==
Nicola met Andrew Forrest in 1988 at his mother's housewarming party and they married in 1991. They have four children, including Sophia. Their third daughter was stillborn in 1998. In July 2023, Nicola and Andrew announced their separation after 31 years of marriage.

She is a Christian.

=== Net worth ===
According to The Australian, Forrest had a net worth of $17.96 billion, as of 2026.

Year	Financial Review Rich List		Forbes Australia's 50 Richest	
Year	Rank	Net worth (A$)	Rank	Net worth (US$)
2024^{[note 1]}	7	$16.92 billion ▲		
2025	9 ▼	$12.83 billion ▼		
2026	7 ▲	$17.32 billion ▲		

Legend
Icon	Description
Steady	Has not changed from the previous year
▲	Has increased from the previous year
▼	Has decreased from the previous year

=== Awards and honours ===
In 2014, Forrest received the Western Australian of the Year Community Award. In 2015, the University of Canberra awarded Forrest with the Chancellor's Award for Service and Philanthropy. In 2018, the Western Australian Museum named Forrest a fellow in recognition of her support of the museum. In 2019, she was appointed an Officer of the Order of Australia in the general division as part of the Queen's Birthday 2019 Honours recognition for her "distinguished service to the community through philanthropic support for education and the arts, to business and to the community".

== Notes ==
- ^1: Net worth was aggregated with Andrew Forrest, prior to 2024.
