= Nanutarra Station =

Pastoral lease in Western Australia

Coordinates: 22.539°S 115.498°E

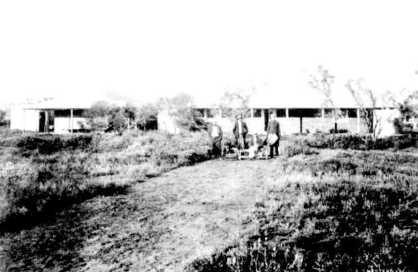
- Nanuturra homestead 1909

- Location within Western Australia

General information
- Type: Station
- Location: 108 kilometres (67 mi) south of Onslow, Pilbara, Western Australia

Western Australia Heritage Register
- Designated: 4 November 2005
- Reference no.: 1743

Nanutarra Station, commonly referred to as Nanutarra, is a pastoral lease that operates as a cattle station, and previously operated as a sheep station, in Western Australia.

== Description ==
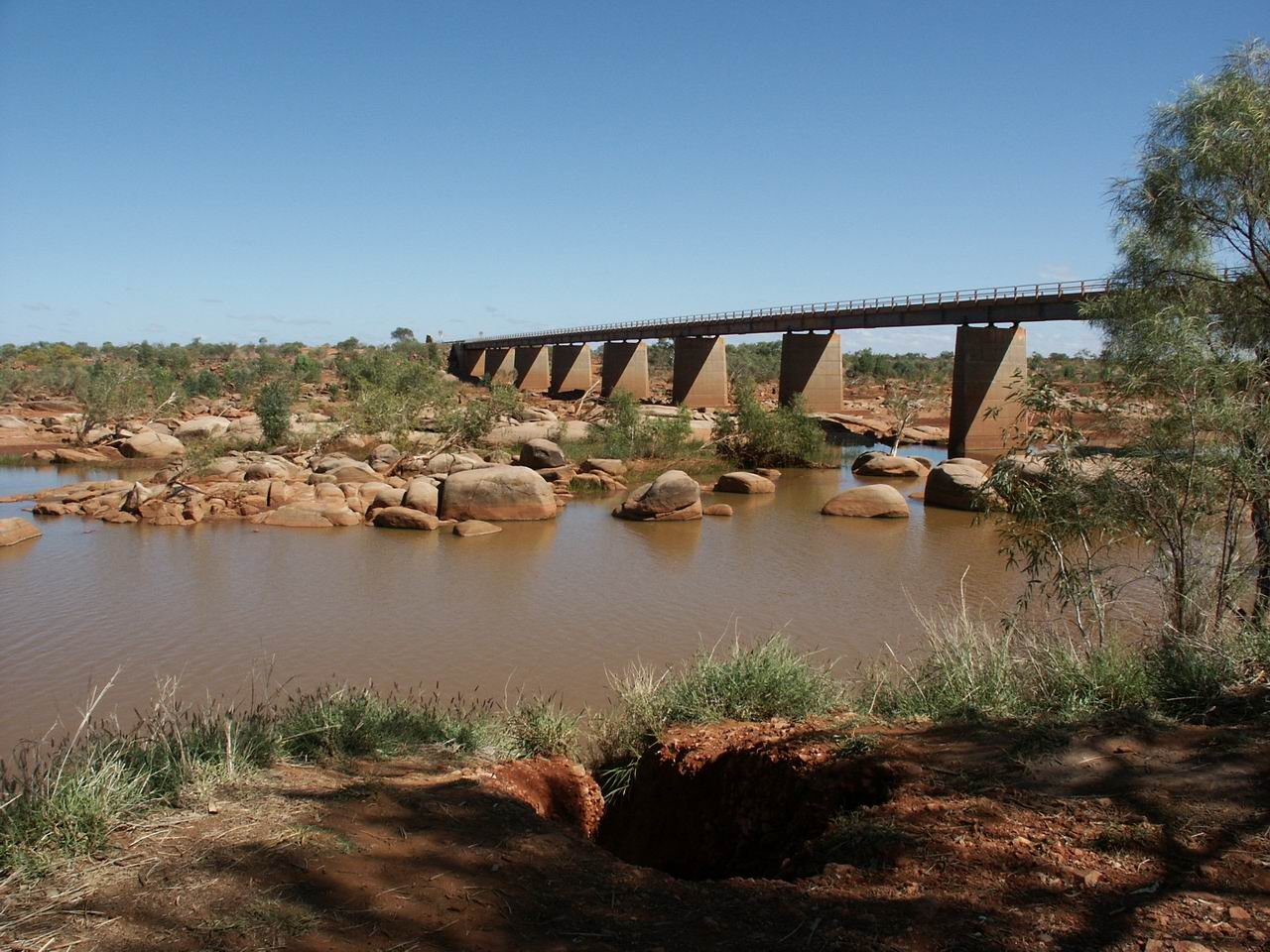
Ashburton River at Nanutarra

It is situated about 108 kilometres (67 mi) south of Onslow and 156 kilometres (97 mi) south east of Exmouth in the Pilbara region. The North West Coastal Highway runs through the property and the Nanutarra Roadhouse is within the station boundary. The Ashburton River and Henry River both traverse the lease. Neighbouring properties include Globe Hill to the west, Uaroo and Glenflorrie to the south, and Boolaloo to the north and east.

== History ==
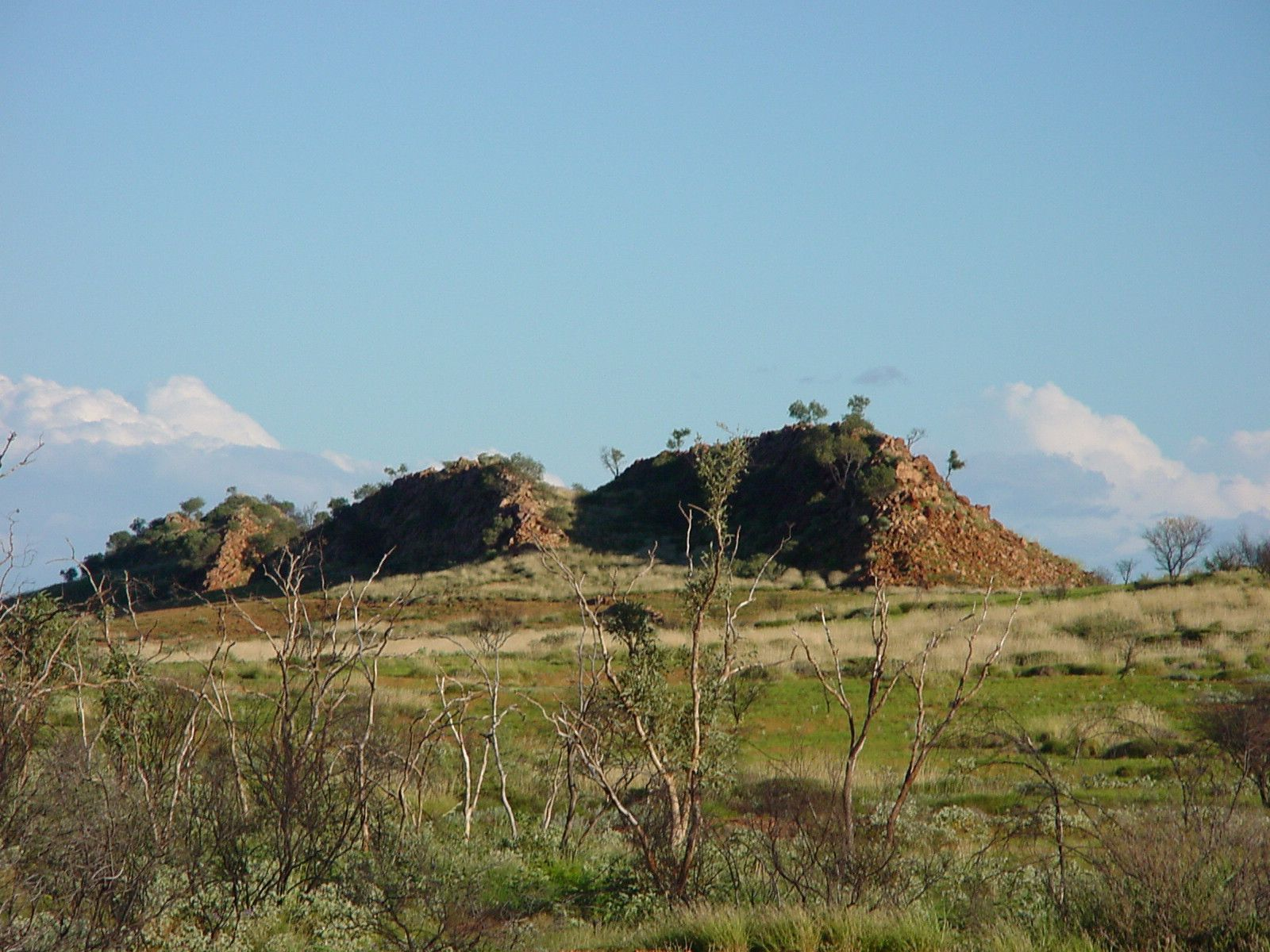
Pyramids Ridge near Nanutarra

The lease was originally used by Harry Higham as grazing land in the 1877, after he had overlanded stock to the property. He developed the homestead in 1884. In 1906 Nanutarra was carrying a flock of approximately 45,000 sheep. By 1919 the holding had grown to become one of the largest in the area.

Harry Higham died in 1917, after managing Nanutarra until 1902 then retiring to live in Perth. The station was placed on the market for auction in 1925 when it occupied an area of 319,507 acres (129,300 ha); improvements included 18 wells, 113 miles (182 km) of boundary fencing and 118 miles (190 km) divisional fencing that divided the property into 17 paddocks. It was stocked with 8,617 sheep at the time. The Higham family retained possession of the station and the Highman brothers sold it in 1937, along with Mount Stuart Station, to the Boololoo Pastoral Company for an undisclosed price.

In 2005 Nanutarra was given permanent status on the Western Australian Register of Heritage Places. The station was one of the original leases in the north west and played an important role in the development of the pastoral industry in the area.

The Nanutarra lease occupies an area of 1,630 square kilometres (629 sq mi), and an agreement was reached between Buurabalayji Thalanyji Aboriginal Corporation and Nanutarra Grazing Pty Ltd regarding land use in 2011 in accordance with the Native Title Act.

The station sold in 2012 along with neighbouring Uaroo Station which were being operated as one holding. Together the leases occupied an area of 4,803 square kilometres (1,854 sq mi) and had a herd of approximately 2,750 cattle with an estimate maximum carrying capacity is 7,600 head. The property contains 70 equipped watering points along with many permanent and semi-permanent waterholes along the creek and river systems. Both properties had been acquired by Andrew Forrest, the Chairman of Fortescue Metals Group, who also owns Minderoo Station to the north of Uaroo.

== Homestead ==
The homestead complex is a simple example of Victorian-Georgian architecture. The main building is composed of two detached wings connected by a covered area. Some of the buildings date back to the 1880s. Most of the complex is in fair to poor condition with most areas having deteriorated as a result of moisture ingress. The buildings were said to have moderate authenticity and are similar to the homesteads at Cooya Pooya and Tambrey stations.

== See also ==
- List of pastoral leases in Western Australia
