= Yanrey =

Pastoral lease in Western Australia

Coordinates: 22.508°S 114.794°E

Location in Western Australia

Yanrey Station, often referred to as Yanrey, is a pastoral lease that operates as a sheep station.

It is located about 93 kilometres (58 mi) south east of Exmouth and 110 kilometres (68 mi) south of Onslow in the Pilbara region of Western Australia.

Yanrey occupies an area of 2,508 square kilometres (968 sq mi) and shares boundaries with Minderoo, Koordarrie, Giralia, Nanutarra, Uaroo and Nyang Stations. The station is made up of broad sandy plains with areas of alluvial clay plains. The Yannanie River flows north-south through the property with flood plains extending outward. The property is able to hold a maximum number of 47,000 sheep.

The station was originally established by John and David Stewart. It was sold to Thomas Frederick de Pledge following the death of John Stewart. De Pledge was already familiar with the area having worked for the Stewarts as a jackaroo and for Alexander Forrest and Septimus Burt on neighbouring Minderoo Station for seven years. De Pledge was appointed manager at Yanrey in 1897 and purchased the property in 1898, when it occupied an area of 270,000 acres (109,265 ha). Over the next three years de Pledge acquired the neighbouring properties of Yannangal, Yannaney and Globe Hill and incorporated them all into Yanrey, giving it a total area of approximately 761,000 acres (3,080 km^{2}). He also worked to improve the flock so that Yanrey wool would always fetch high prices at market. At one stage Yanrey was the third largest property in the Ashburton District, with a size of 876,892 acres (354,866 ha).

In 1906 Yanrey was carrying a flock of approximately 30,000 sheep. A cyclone in 1909 wreaked havoc at Yanrey with all of the windmills destroyed, miles of fencing lost and the country left under water.

By the 1920s both horses and camels as well as motor vehicles were used to transport the wool clip from stations in the area. Motor vehicles were unable to traverse roads used by stock in the wet, so between 1927 and 1930 a number of roads were gazette for motor vehicle use only. One of the roads was built to Yanrey.

Alex Maitland stepped down as station manager in 1952 and was replaced with Ashley Paterson.

Yanrey was stocked with 12,730 sheep and 1,210 cattle in 1979.

== Homestead ==
The homestead was initially constructed in 1901, with a further expansion of the eastern wing in 1915. The main building has a timber frame covered with corrugated iron. The rectangular shaped homestead has twin hipped roofs and a surrounding verandah reflecting the two stage construction. The homestead is heritage listed.

== See also ==
- List of pastoral leases in Western Australia
