= Thalanyji =

The Thalanyji, also spelt Thalandji, Dhalandji, and other variations, are an Aboriginal Australian people in the Pilbara region of Western Australia.

== Country ==
Thalanyji lands, according to Norman Tindale, encompassed approximately 4,500 square miles (12,000 km^{2}), running along the Ashburton River, and extending from the coast to Nanutarra, Boolaloo, and the lower Henry River. Tindale thought that their presence around Exmouth Gulf reflected late migration to that area.

== Society ==
The Thalanyji practised neither circumcision or subincision.

== Language ==
The Thalanyji spoke the Thalanyji language, but this is thought to be now extinct.

== Alternative names ==
- Talanji, Talanjee, Dalandji, Talaindji, Talainji, Tallainji, Dalaindji
- Djalendi, Talandi
- Tallainga
- Dhalandji, Dalandji, Djalandji, Inikurdira, Jinigudira, Talandji, Yinikurtira, Dalaindji, Dalangi, Dalanjdji, Dalendi, Djalandi, Djalendi, Mulgarnu, Talaindji, Talainji, Talandi, Talangee, Talanjee, Talanji, Talinje, Tallainga, Tallainji, Taloinga, Thalanji, Tal lainga, Jinigudera, Jinigura, Jiniguri, Jarungura

== Sources ==
- "AIATSIS map of Indigenous Australia". AIATSIS. 14 May 2024.
- "Tindale Tribal Boundaries" (PDF). Department of Aboriginal Affairs, Western Australia. September 2016. Archived from the original (PDF) on 8 March 2016.
- Tindale, Norman Barnett (1974). "Talandji (WA)". Aboriginal Tribes of Australia: Their Terrain, Environmental Controls, Distribution, Limits, and Proper Names. Australian National University. ISBN 978-0-708-10741-6. Archived from the original on 20 March 2020.
