= Giralia =

Pastoral lease in Western Australia

Coordinates: 22.68439°S 114.36779°E

Location in Western Australia

Giralia Station, often referred to as Giralia, is a pastoral lease that operates as a sheep station.

It is located about 125 kilometres (78 mi) south of Exmouth and 310 kilometres (193 mi) north of Carnarvon in the Gascoyne region of Western Australia.

The homestead is about 45 kilometres (28 mi) from the North West Coastal Highway. The property shares boundaries with Marrilla, Bullara, and Yanrey Stations; it also has frontage onto Exmouth Gulf.

The property occupies an area of 2,776 square kilometres (1,072 sq mi), of which about half is sand plains and the rest made up of dunes, limestone plains and stony plains, all of which are suitable for grazing.

The station was originally established in 1888; the lease encompassed an area of 2,047 square kilometres (790 sq mi) and was taken up by the H. R. Frencry and Company. Construction of a homestead commenced in 1910, and it was extended to its present size in 1916. By 1930 the property was carrying a flock of 44,000 sheep and produced a clip of 700 bales of wool during shearing.

Giralia turned to tourist accommodation after being acquired by the Department of Conservation and Land Management in 2002 and has been managed as a national park. The Blake family remain on the property to run the tourist venue. In 2011, a massive bushfire that consumed an area of 1,500 square kilometres (579 sq mi) came to within 40 metres (131 ft) of the homestead.

== See also ==
- List of pastoral leases in Western Australia
