= Minderoo Station =

Pastoral lease in Western Australia

Coordinates: 21.996°S 115.043°E

Location in Western Australia

Minderoo Station, commonly referred to as Minderoo, is a pastoral lease that once operated as a sheep station but now operates as a cattle station in Western Australia.

== Description ==
It is situated about 41 km (25 mi) south of Onslow and 138 km (86 mi) west of Pannawonica in the Pilbara region. The property occupies an area of 2,400 km^{2} (927 sq mi) and is traversed by the Ashburton River; the property has an estimated 80 km (50 mi) double frontage to the river. The property spreads out from the river forming a vast plain of sand and clay. The word Minderoo is Aboriginal in origin and means "place of permanent and clean water".

== History ==
The station was initially formed by E.T. Hooley, who was given the pastoral lease in 1867 by the colonial Government of Western Australia as a reward for creating a stock route from Perth to Roebourne. By 1869, the local Aboriginal population began to use force to try to break the British occupation of their land. One of Hooley's shepherds, a man named Hill, was found dead and it was presumed he was killed by Aboriginals. The death was reported to authorities at Roebourne and two subsequent punitive missions were organised. The first was led by Hooley, who assembled the men working on the station and went out with them to attack a nearby native campsite. The resulting "skirmish was brief and effective". An armed Government force from Roebourne arrived a couple days later under the leadership of Farquhar MacRae. This group, together with Hooley and his men, implemented an early dawn attack on another Aboriginal settlement. The resulting episode of frontier conflict was dubbed the Battle of Minderoo. A poem was written about the battle, which described it as "fierce, with casualties and woes", but the result was a massacre of Indigenous people with little wounding of the British combatants. Despite their victory in the conflict, Hooley had to abandon the property not long after, due to continued Aboriginal resistance.

The property wasn't taken up again until the Forrest brothers secured the leasehold in 1878. David Forrest was the initial manager, and the property was owned by his brothers, John and Alexander Forrest, along with Septimus Burt.

Once the Forrest and Burt syndicate had acquired the lease, David Forrest overlanded 2,000 sheep to Minderoo. By 1884, the property was supporting a flock of 16,000 sheep, approximately 800 cattle and 80 horses.

In 1888, a fire destroyed the kitchen and its contents along with one side of the homestead; David Forrest was injured during the blaze. By 1891 the size of the flock was estimated to be 50,000 sheep, cattle and horses. The partnership of Forrest, Burt and Company was dissolved in 1901. The Forrests were now sole owners of Minderoo and had appointed Arthur Bailey as the station manager. In 1906, Minderoo was carrying a flock of approximately 33,000 sheep.

Employees at Minderoo felt an air shock and heard a rumble of the first British nuclear tests on Monte Bello Island in 1952. The station was about 145 km (90 mi) from the blast site. In 1954, Jack Reynolds was hired to cull feral cattle from the property. Reynolds then slaughtered and butchered the cattle and hired an Anson aircraft to deliver over 272 kilograms (600 lb) of beef to Carnarvon.

Minderoo was owned by the Forrest family until it was sold in 1998 by Donald Forrest due to relentless drought and debt. Donald's son, the mining magnate Andrew Forrest, whose early years were spent as a jackaroo at Minderoo, bought the property in 2009 for A$12 million.

After buying back Minderoo in 2009, Andrew Forrest hired Phil Clark to manage the property. Clark reduced the herd size from 11,000 to 3,500 head of cattle to give the land a chance to regenerate. A weir was also installed on the Ashburton to guarantee water supply and assist in regeneration of the river.

The Forrests introduced Droughtmaster, Red Angus, Ultra Black Angus bulls onto Minderoo to build a composite herd for the fine dining market. By 2015, they had announced that they would be seeking organic certification for the property.

In 2017, it was reported that Andrew Forrest had plans to use centre-pivot irrigation to produce melons, onions, potatoes and sweet potatoes on up to 1000 hectares. In 2017, Minderoo Station was already producing 120 hectares of Rhodes grass as cattle feed using this irrigation method.

Since 2017, Minderoo Station has been the focus of a legal and cultural dispute between Forrest’s pastoral interests and the Thalanyji Traditional Owners, whose ancestral country includes the Ashburton River (Minduruu). In that year, Forrest’s company lodged an application under Section 18 of the Aboriginal Heritage Act 1972 (WA) seeking approval for up to ten “upside-down leaky weirs” and two granite quarries along the river, purportedly to supply irrigation for the station. The Thalanyji people consider the entire watercourse to be a sacred site and the dwelling of the ancestral water serpent, Warnamankura, and expressed concern the proposal would irreversibly damage their law, culture and Country. “The river is where we do our learning,” said Thalanyji Elder Ms Hayes. “The river is everything, it’s part of us. And it’s connected with everyone.” The Buurabalayji Thalanyji Aboriginal Corporation (BTAC), representing the Thalanyji, described the appeal of Forrest’s plan as “extremely disappointing”, emphasising that the Spirit-serpent’s path must remain undisturbed. In 2019 the former WA Minister for Aboriginal Affairs rejected the Section 18 application citing the high cultural significance of the river. However, in August 2024 the Western Australian Supreme Court found procedural error in how the matter had been handled by the State Administrative Tribunal of Western Australia (SAT) and remitted the matter to SAT for rehearing in 2025. The dispute highlights the tension between pastoral-agricultural development on Minderoo Station and the protection of Indigenous heritage and sacred waterways on which the Thalanyji have maintained custodianship for more than 60,000 years.

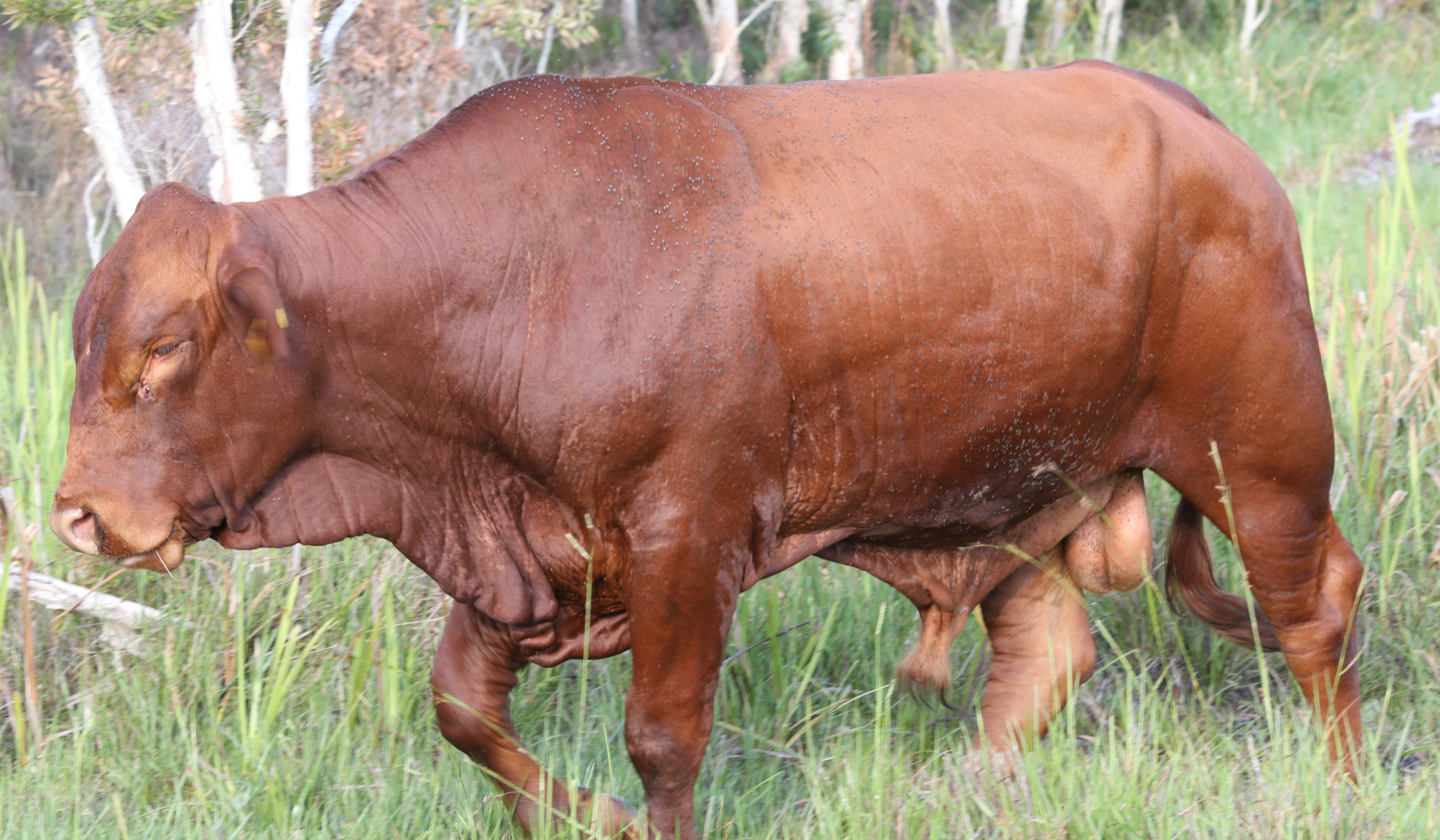
Droughtmaster bull

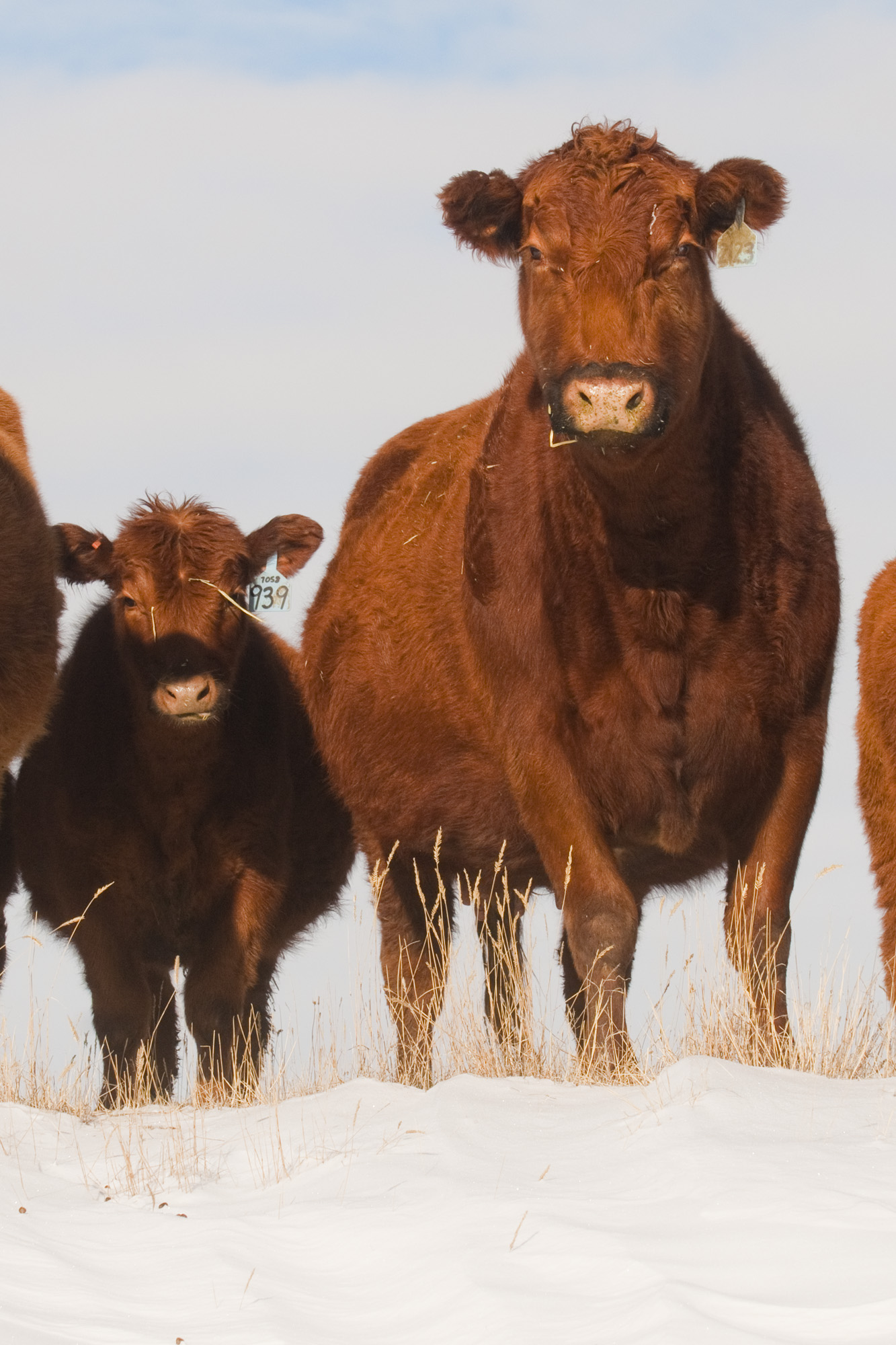
Red Angus cattle

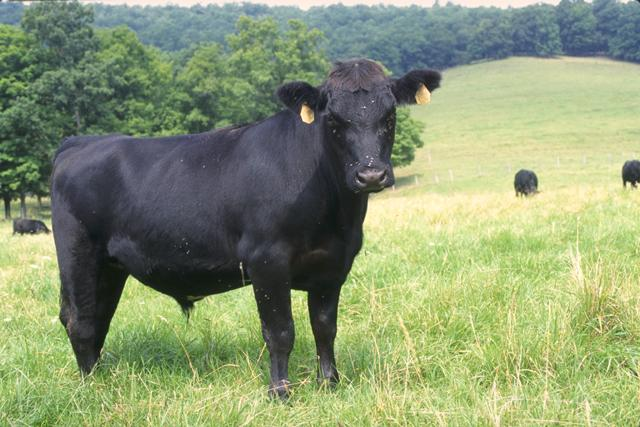
Black Angus heiffer

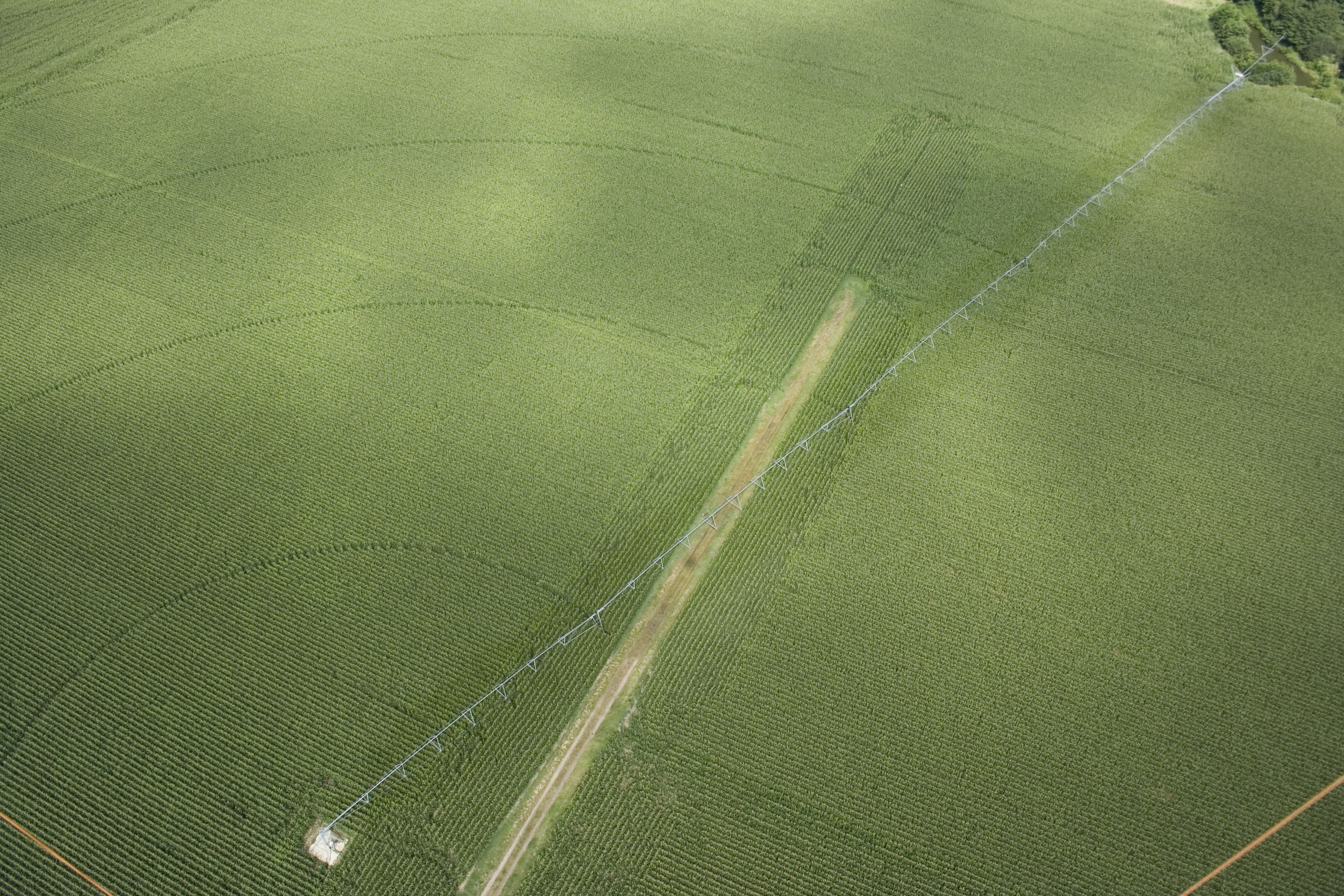
An example of centre-pivot irrigation

== See also ==
- List of ranches and stations
