= Onslow, Western Australia =

Onslow
- Town
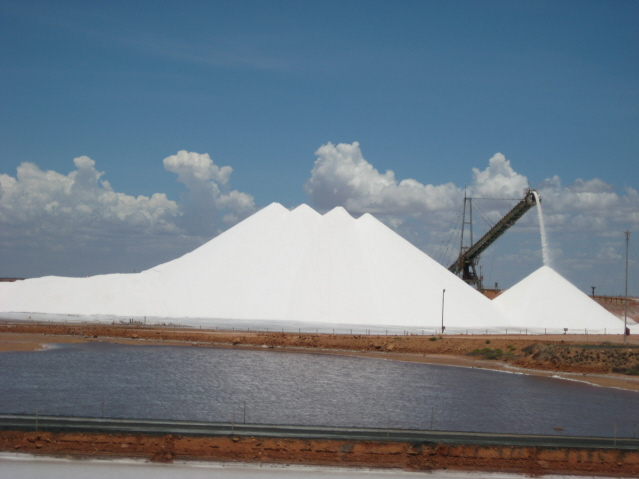
- Salt mine near Onslow

- Interactive map of Onslow
- Coordinates: 21.64°S 115.11°E
- Country: Australia
- State: Western Australia
- LGA: Shire of Ashburton
- Location: 1,386 km (861 mi) from Perth; 259 km (161 mi) from Karratha; 489 km (304 mi) from Carnarvon
- Established: 1885 (1925 moved)

Government
  - State electorate: Pilbara
  - Federal division: Durack

Area
  - Total: 185.2 km^{2} (71.5 sq mi)
- Elevation: 6 m (20 ft)

Population
  - Total: 813 (UCL 2021)
- Postcode: 6710

Onslow is a coastal town in the Pilbara region of Western Australia, 1,386 kilometres (861 mi) north of Perth. It had a population of 829 people as at 2021 and is located within the Shire of Ashburton local government area.

The town is served by Onslow Airport, and is located 76 km off of the North West Coastal Highway.

== History ==
Onslow was gazetted on 26 October 1885 as a town to serve the port at Ashburton Roads, at the mouth of the Ashburton River, exporting wool from sheep stations of the Pilbara hinterland. It was named after the Chief Justice of Western Australia, Alexander Onslow.

Wool continued to be the major industry for the next 80 years, despite the extremes of drought and flood that characterize the region and are related to the passage or absence of cyclones.

Although a large jetty was built at the original site of Onslow (Old Onslow), repeated cyclone damage and the silting up of the river caused increasing problems with the loading and unloading of visiting ships. The cargo was transferred by lighter from the ship in Ashburton Roads to the jetty, then by horse-tram from the jetty across 6 kilometres (3.7 mi) of marshland inland to the town. This led the state government in 1923 to develop a new town and jetty 18 kilometres (11 mi) north-east at Beadon Point. The new townsite was gazetted on 10 January 1924, and the residents of Old Onslow moved across in 1925. The new location for Onslow's jetty was better protected from storm damage with the townsite more conveniently located on the coast.

On 15 May 1943, Onslow became the most southerly town in Australia to be bombed by Imperial Japan in World War II, when a single plane bombed the airfield. However, there was no damage or casualties.

Since the war, the declining purchasing power of wool has, despite consistently good rainfall on the inland sheep stations since the late 1960s, led to a change in focus of Onslow's economy from wool to tourism. It is an access point for Coral Coast activities, such as scuba diving on the coral reefs offshore from the town.

== Climate ==
Onslow has a hot desert climate (BWh) having low year round rainfall with most of it falling in the first half of the year. Only a few months have average highs below 27 °C (80.6 °F). Onslow registered the highest temperature ever recorded in Australia (along with Oodnadatta in January 1960) at 50.7 °C (123.26 °F) on 13 January 2022. This was also the highest temperature ever recorded in the Southern Hemisphere (again, along with Oodnadatta in January 1960).

Climate data for Onslow
Month	Jan	Feb	Mar	Apr	May	Jun	Jul	Aug	Sep	Oct	Nov	Dec	Year
Record high °C (°F)	50.7 (123.3)	48.3 (118.9)	47.2 (117.0)	43.4 (110.1)	39.0 (102.2)	33.5 (92.3)	33.4 (92.1)	37.7 (99.9)	41.7 (107.1)	46.0 (114.8)	45.5 (113.9)	49.2 (120.6)	50.7 (123.3)
Mean daily maximum °C (°F)	36.5 (97.7)	36.4 (97.5)	36.2 (97.2)	33.9 (93.0)	29.4 (84.9)	26.0 (78.8)	25.5 (77.9)	27.4 (81.3)	30.2 (86.4)	33.0 (91.4)	34.4 (93.9)	36.0 (96.8)	32.1 (89.8)
Mean daily minimum °C (°F)	24.5 (76.1)	25.1 (77.2)	24.4 (75.9)	21.6 (70.9)	17.5 (63.5)	14.4 (57.9)	13.1 (55.6)	13.7 (56.7)	15.6 (60.1)	18.0 (64.4)	20.2 (68.4)	22.5 (72.5)	19.2 (66.6)
Record low °C (°F)	16.3 (61.3)	15.1 (59.2)	16.0 (60.8)	10.9 (51.6)	7.5 (45.5)	3.1 (37.6)	4.0 (39.2)	5.4 (41.7)	7.9 (46.2)	8.9 (48.0)	12.9 (55.2)	15.6 (60.1)	3.1 (37.6)
Average rainfall mm (inches)	35.4 (1.39)	58.0 (2.28)	69.0 (2.72)	12.4 (0.49)	51.3 (2.02)	44.8 (1.76)	18.7 (0.74)	8.2 (0.32)	1.5 (0.06)	0.7 (0.03)	2.5 (0.10)	3.2 (0.13)	305.7 (12.04)
Average rainy days (≥ 1 mm)	2.2	2.9	2.2	1.0	2.6	2.5	1.4	0.9	0.3	0.1	0.3	0.4	16.8

During Onslow's long history, the town has gone through the extremes of heatwaves, heavy rains and cyclones. For example, in 1912, Onslow received only 14.5 millimetres (0.57 in) of rainfall and during 1935-36 combined only 126 millimetres (4.96 in) fell. However, in 1961 a record 997.9 millimetres (39.29 in) was recorded, most of which fell between late January and early March, a result of three cyclone impacts within five weeks. These cyclones brought heavy rain and destructive winds to Onslow, resulting in flooding and damage to buildings. A major long-term drought between 1935 and 1941, during which time only one cyclone hit (in April 1937) and did not produce rain on the inland sheep stations, led to a decline in Onslow's fortunes.

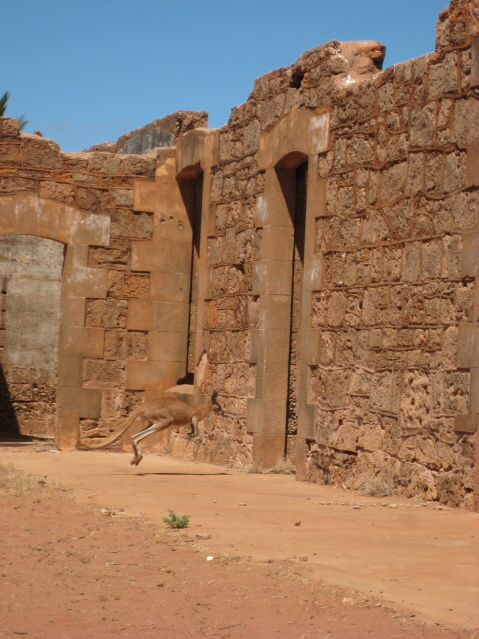
A kangaroo in the ruins of Old Onslow

=== Cyclones ===
Numerous cyclones have impacted Onslow over the years; the first recorded by white colonists was in 1880. On 28 March 1934, a severe cyclone hit the town, with the new jetty nearly destroyed. All the buildings suffered damage, with some destroyed. Another severe cyclone crossed the coast at Onslow on 7 February 1963, damaging nearly every building in town. Destructive wind gusts of 231 kilometres per hour (144 mph; 64 m/s) were recorded during the cyclone, which bent telephone poles, leaving them parallel with the ground. On 19 February 1975, Severe Tropical Cyclone Trixie crossed the coast near Onslow, with the cyclone's centre passing directly over nearby Mardie. A wind gust of 246 kilometres per hour (153 mph; 68 m/s) were recorded at Onslow, whilst wind gusts of 259 kilometres per hour (161 mph; 72 m/s) at Mardie (This was the limit of the recorder, so the gusts at Mardie may have been higher). At the time, the wind gust recorded at Onslow was the highest recorded in Australia.

== Transport ==
A seven kilometre tramway ran from the original townsite to carry cargo.
