= Great Northern Highway =

Highway in Western Australia

Great Northern Highway Western Australia
- Map of Western Australia with the Great Northern Highway highlighted in red

General information
- Type: Highway
- Length: 3,194.66 km (1,985 mi)
- Gazetted: 10 March 1944
- Route number(s): National Highway 95 (Middle Swan – Mundabullangana); National Highway 1 (Mundabullangana – Victoria Highway); National Route 1 (Midland – Muchea); State Route 155 (Victoria Highway – Wyndham)
- Tourist routes: Swan Valley Tourist Drive (Tourist Drive 203, Perth); Geikie–Windjana Tourist Way (Tourist Drive 350, Geikie Gorge National Park – Fitzroy Crossing); Chittering Valley Tourist Way (Tourist Drive 359, Bullsbrook); Midlands Tourist Way (Tourist Drive 360, Upper Swan – Walebing)

Major junctions
- Southwest end: Morrison Road, (National Routes 1), Midland, Perth
- Reid Highway (State Route 3); Roe Highway (National Highway 95 / State Route 3); Tonkin Highway (State Route 4); Brand Highway (National Route 1); Geraldton-Mount Magnet Road (State Route 123); Goldfields Highway; North West Coastal Highway (National Route 1); Victoria Highway (National Highway 1)
- Northeast end: Harbour Road, Wyndham

Location(s)
- Major settlements: Bullsbrook, New Norcia, Dalwallinu, Mount Magnet, Meekatharra, Newman, Port Hedland, Broome Fitzroy Crossing, Halls Creek

Highway system
- Highways in Australia; National Highway • Freeways in Australia; Highways in Western Australia

The Great Northern Highway is an Australian highway that links Western Australia's capital city Perth with its northernmost port, Wyndham. With a length of almost 3,200 kilometres (2,000 mi), it is the longest highway in Australia, with the majority included as part of the Perth Darwin National Highway. The highway, which travels through remote areas of the state, is constructed as a sealed, predominantly two-lane single carriageway, but with some single-lane bridges in the Kimberley. Economically, it provides vital access through the Wheatbelt and Mid West to the resource-rich regions of the Pilbara and Kimberley. In these areas, the key industries of mining, agriculture and pastoral stations, and tourism are all dependent on the highway.

In Perth, the highway begins in Midland near the Great Eastern Highway, and further north intersects the Reid and Roe highways, which together form Perth's ring road. There are also three rural highways that spur off the Great Northern Highway. Brand Highway and North West Coastal Highway provide an alternative coastal route between Muchea and Port Hedland, while Victoria Highway carries the National Highway route and interstate traffic into the Northern Territory. Various road routes are allocated to sections of the Great Northern Highway, including the Highway 1 routes National Route 1 and National Highway 1, as well as National Highway 95. In 2024 the section north of Victoria Highway was assigned National Highway 1, as well as State Route 155

The highway was created in 1944 from existing roads in the Wheatbelt and a series of tracks through remote pastoral areas. However, it was a hazardous route that could be dusty in the dry season, and boggy or washed away in the wet season. Some sections were effectively impassable sand, while others contained limestone outcrops. Economic growth and development in northern Western Australia prompted initial improvement efforts, and the federal government's Beef Roads Scheme in the 1960s resulted in a noticeably higher-quality road in the Kimberley. Construction of a sealed road from Perth to Wyndham, including numerous bridges to reduce the impact of seasonal flooding, took many years to complete. The last section opened on 16 December 1989, and received national media coverage. However, by then many older sections were either worn out or not up to modern standards. Various upgrades have been carried out in small sections, across the length of the highway, with further works planned. The southernmost part of the highway, from Midland to Muchea, was bypassed in 2020 by the NorthLink WA project that upgraded and extended the Tonkin Highway to Muchea. This section remains in use for local traffic and tourism to the Swan Valley area.

== Route description ==
The Great Northern Highway is the main north–south route between Perth and the northern areas of Western Australia. Covering a distance of 3,195 kilometres (1,985 mi), it is the longest highway in Australia. From Midland in Perth's north-east, the highway heads generally north-east through the Wheatbelt and Mid West to Newman, north-west to the coastal Pilbara town of Port Hedland, along the coastline to Broome, east to Halls Creek, and finally north to Wyndham, on the state's northern coastline. Sixty kilometres (37 mi) out from Wyndham, the highway intersects the start of Victoria Highway, which carries interstate traffic to the Northern Territory via Kununurra. Various road routes are allocated to sections of the Great Northern Highway, which is mostly a National Highway route, and also forms part of Australia's Highway 1. It is signed as National Route 1 from Midland to Middle Swan, National Highway 95 and National Route 1 concurrently from Middle Swan to Muchea, National Highway 95 from Muchea to Mundabullangana, National Highway 1 from Mundabullangana to Victoria Highway, and State Route 155 from Victoria Highway to its northern terminus at Wyndham. The vast majority of the highway is a two-lane single carriageway, although as of 2014 there are thirteen single-lane bridges and four single-lane floodways in the Kimberley. The speed limit is 110 kilometres per hour (70 mph) except in and around built up areas.

The Great Northern Highway travels to remote areas of Western Australia, including the Munjina Roadhouse near the Hamersley Ranges, and the communities of Eighty Mile Beach, Wallal, Sandfire and Mandora, which are located between Broome and Port Hedland. Economically, the Great Northern Highway is also a vital link in the resource rich regions of the Wheatbelt, Mid West, Pilbara, and Kimberley. The key industries of mining, agriculture, and pastoral stations are all dependent on the highway as a significant and in some cases only method of transport. Tourism accounts for a significant portion of the road's traffic, and is a growing part of or potential growth source for the regional economies. The highway provides access to a variety of tourist attractions, including New Norcia and various national parks, including Karijini. Parts of the highway itself are included in the tourist routes Swan Valley Tourist Drive (Tourist Drive 203) in Perth, Chittering Valley Tourist Way (Tourist Drive 359) in Bullsbrook, Midlands Tourist Way (Tourist Drive 360) from Upper Swan to Walebing, and Geikie–Windjana Tourist Way (Tourist Drive 350) from Geikie Gorge National Park to Fitzroy Crossing.

Main Roads Western Australia monitors traffic volume across the state's road network, including various locations along the Great Northern Highway. From 2007/08 to 2008/09, the recorded traffic volumes ranged between 7,830 and 17,710 vehicles per weekday in Perth, 510 to 2,990 in the Wheatbelt, 470 to 590 in the Mid West, 390 to 10,840 in the Pilbara, and 170 to 4,090 in the Kimberley. The highest percentage of heavy traffic was 52.5%, north of Newman Drive in the Pilbara. Overall, the Great Northern Highway performs favourably in terms of road safety, compared to other major highways in Western Australia. Whilst making up two thirds of the state's National Highway network, it was the location of only half of all recorded fatalities for 2005–2009. For that period, the sections of the highway from Wubin to the Sandfire Roadhouse, north-east of Port Hedland, were considered by the Australian Automobile Association to be among the lowest risk highway links in the state. However, the section from Perth to Wubin was rated as medium risk, and the northern sections of the highway were rated medium-high and high risk. In 2013, the Great Northern Highway received a similar rating, still higher overall than the other highways. Out of five stars, 21% was rated as one- or two-star, and 79% was rated three- or four-star, with the southern and northern ends of the highway generally less safe than the portion from Wubin to the Sandfire Roadhouse.

=== Perth ===
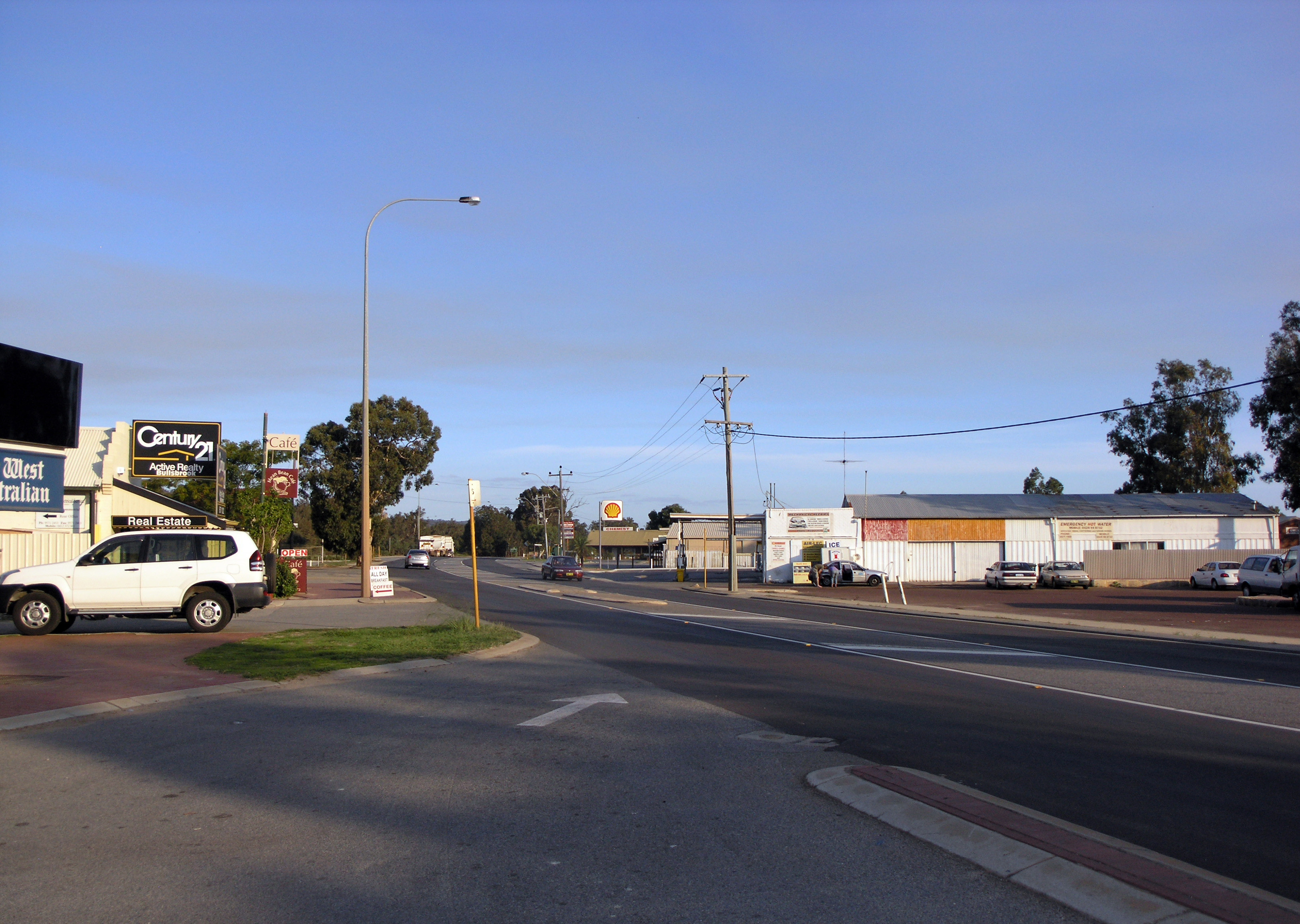
Within Perth, Bullsbrook is the northernmost urban area along the Great Northern Highway.

The Great Northern Highway begins at Morrison Road, Midland, in Perth's north-eastern suburbs, signed as National Route 1. Though it originally commenced at the Great Eastern Highway, that section is no longer contiguous, and is now named the Old Great Northern Highway. The highway heads north through Middle Swan, intersecting the start of Toodyay Road after 1.3 kilometres (0.8 mi), and then the meeting point of Reid and Roe Highways after another 1.4 kilometres (0.9 mi). Those highways come together from Perth's ring road, signed as State Route 3, and north of this intersection the Great Northern Highway is concurrently allocated National Highway 95 and National Route 1. It continues north through the Swan Valley for 9.5 kilometres (6 mi), passing many wineries, restaurants, and other tourist attractions. The highway crosses the Swan River and intersects West Swan Road, before turning north-east to travel around the residential part of Upper Swan. The Great Northern Highway continues north for thirteen kilometres (8 mi) beyond West Swan Road, past larger agricultural properties, to reach Bullsbrook, the last urban area within the Perth Metropolitan Region. After 11.5 kilometres (7 mi) beyond Bullsbrook, the highway reaches the edge of the Perth metropolitan area at the City of Swan–Shire of Chittering boundary, where it passes into the Wheatbelt.

=== Wheatbelt ===
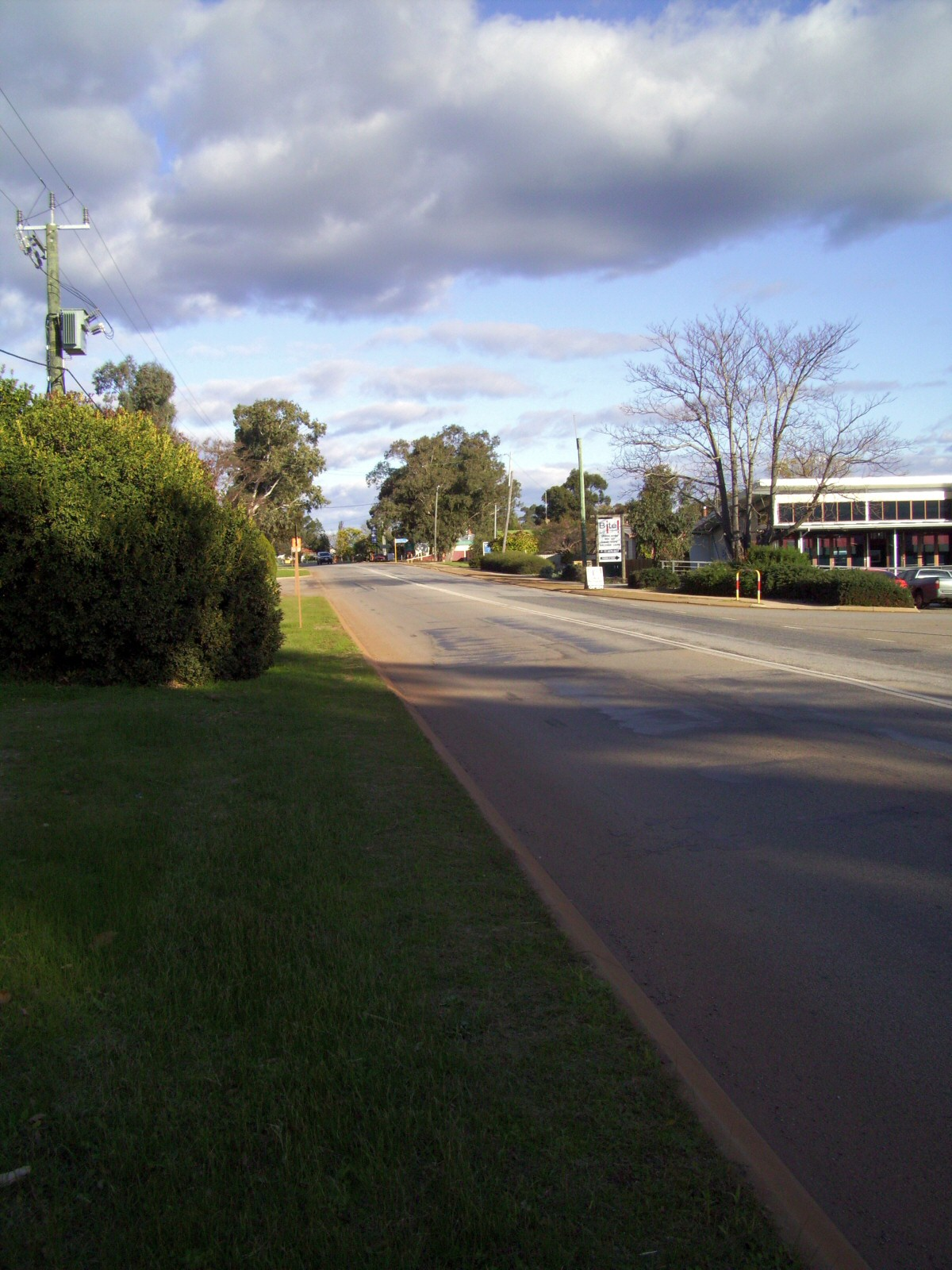
View south from Bindoon

In the Wheatbelt, the Great Northern Highway links small town sites with the surrounding rural farmland, occasionally passing by remnant patches of woodlands. From the north-eastern edge of Perth, the highway travels north for three kilometres (2 mi) to Muchea. At Muchea the road curves to the west to approach a roundabout interchange with both Brand Highway and Tonkin Highway. Unlike other interchanges in the outskirts of Perth, the Great Northern Highway is not free flowing with the interchange configured to have an overpass connecting the northern continuation of the Great Northern Highway with Tonkin Highway to the south instead. Traffic wanting to continue on the Great Northern Highway needs to turn right at the roundabout to continue northwards while southbound traffic needs to exit the main carriageway and turn left at the roundabout. Brand Highway and National Route 1 continues to the west of the roundabout. There is also a Road train assembly area in the southeast quadrant of the interchange.

The Great Northern Highway and National Highway 95 then continues north-east for 26 kilometres (16 mi). It passes to the west of Lake Chittering, curves east to cross the Brockman River, and then back north to Bindoon. Five kilometres (3 mi) further north, Bindoon–Moora Road branches off to the north-west, while the highway skirts east briefly then continues north, reaching New Norcia after 46 kilometres (29 mi). The starting point of The Midlands Road is located at Walebing, 35 kilometres (22 mi) further north; from there, the Great Northern Highway heads north-east for 18 kilometres (11 mi) to Bindi Bindi, north for 17 kilometres (11 mi) to Miling, then east for 33 kilometres (21 mi) to the northern end of Northam–Pithara Road, and shortly thereafter Pithara. From here, another 16 kilometres (10 mi) takes the road to Dalwallinu, and Wubin is 20 kilometres (12 mi) further north.

=== Mid West ===
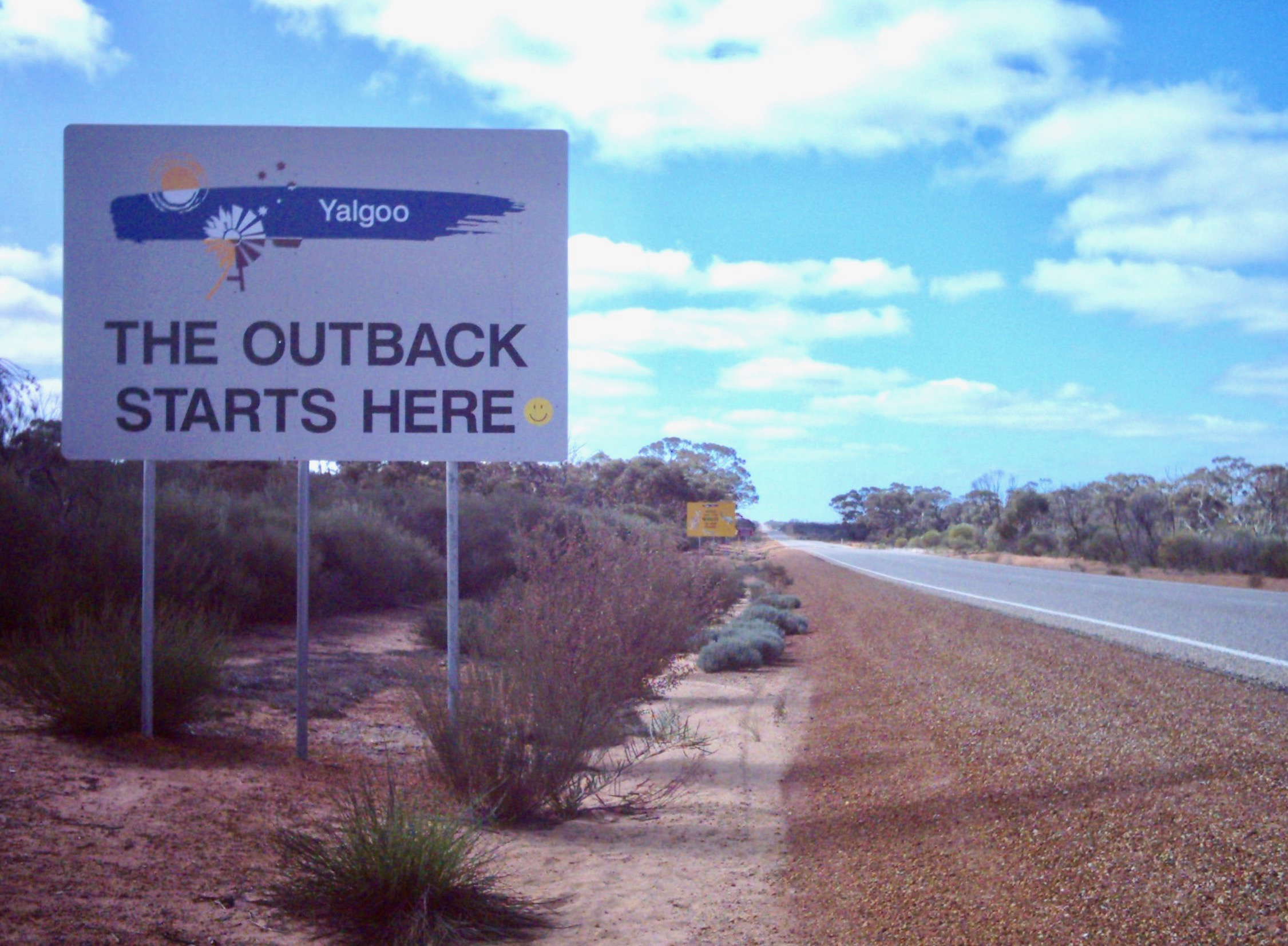
North-east of Wubin, the highway travels into the Outback.

As the Great Northern Highway heads north-east from Wubin out of the Wheatbelt, the vegetation changes to arid shrubland. In the Mid West region, the long stretches between settlements show few signs of human activity, other than the highway itself. The first such settlement is Paynes Find, 154 kilometres (96 mi) out from Wubin. At this point the highway heads north again, reaching Mount Magnet after 143 kilometres (89 mi), and then Cue after another 80 kilometres (50 mi). The road travels north-east for 115 kilometres (71 mi) to Meekatharra, and then has a long 412-kilometre (256 mi) stretch up to the northern edge of the Mid West at the Fortescue River, near Newman Airport. Halfway along this stretch the highway passes a roadhouse at Kumarina.

=== Pilbara ===
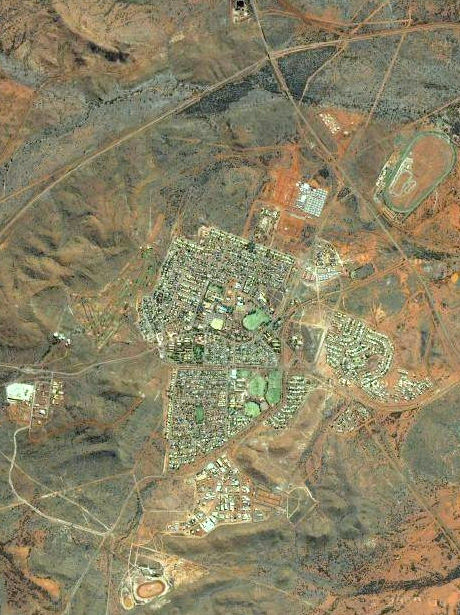
The Great Northern Highway travels past the north-east of Newman.

Four kilometres (2.5 mi) after crossing the Fortescue River, the Great Northern Highway intersects Marble Bar Road, the highway's original alignment. It proceeds north to Marble Bar, mostly as an unsealed road, whilst the highway deviates north-west, reaching Newman after three kilometres (2 mi). The flat landscape gives way to gentle ranges, which the highway meanders around as it heads west-north-west for 109 kilometres (68 mi). It then curves around to the north, proceeding over a distance of 48 kilometres (30 mi) to Karijini Road, the entrance road to the Karijini National Park. The highway continues north for another 35 kilometres (22 mi), travelling through the north-eastern corner of the national park to Nanutarra Munjina Road. The Great Northern Highway proceeds on its journey north, crossing the Yule River and its tributaries. The highway then runs parallel to the Turner River over a 220-kilometre (140 mi) distance until it reaches North West Coastal Highway. This junction is the northern terminus of the National Highway 95, and Great Northern Highway continues north-east as National Highway 1 – part of Australia's Highway 1, which is signed as National Route 1 along North West Coastal Highway. The turnoff for Port Hedland is 32 kilometres (20 mi) north-east of the intersection, and from there the highway heads east for 40 kilometres (25 mi) to the northern end of Marble Bar Road, reaching Pardoo after another 72 kilometres (45 mi). It parallels the coastline thereafter, passing into the Kimberley region shortly after the Pardoo Roadhouse.

=== Kimberley ===
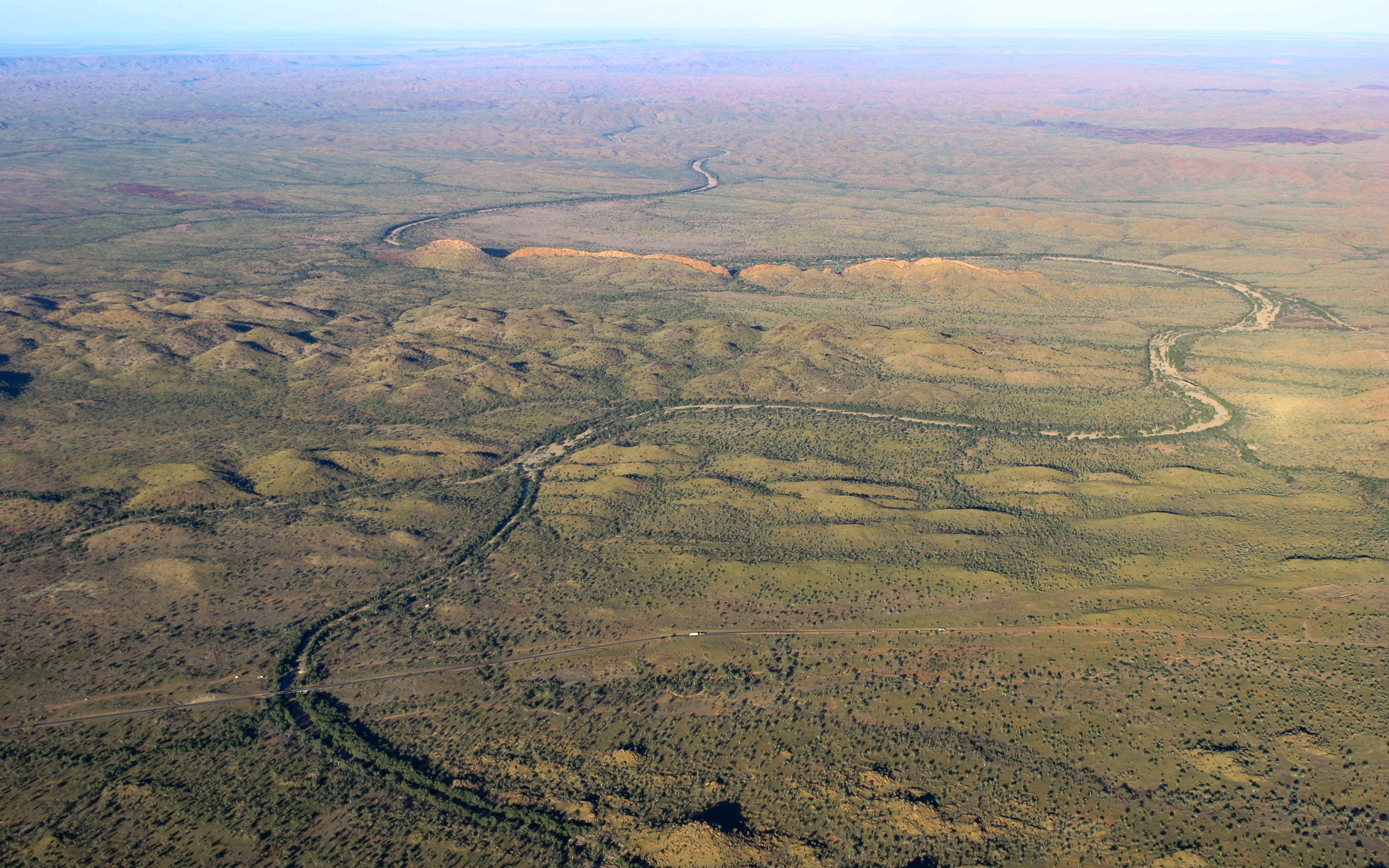
The Great Northern Highway passing the Little Phantom River between Halls Creek and Warmun

From Pardoo, the Great Northern Highway travels north-east, paralleling the coastline for 455 kilometres (283 mi), and passing Eighty Mile Beach near the Sandfire Roadhouse. The vegetation becomes denser woodlands once more as the highway heads into the Kimberley's tropical monsoon climate. At Roebuck the highway turns east, heading inland, while Broome Roads spurs off to the west, connecting to Broome. After 145 kilometres (90 mi), the highway crosses the Fitzroy River on Willare Bridge and reaches the turnoff for Derby, Derby Highway, in Willare. The Great Northern Highway continues east for 217 kilometres (135 mi) to Fitzroy Crossing, where it crosses the Fitzroy River a second time. It continues east, curving around the southern side of the Margaret River, and reaching Tanami Road after 272 kilometres (169 mi). The town of Halls Creek and the Duncan Road turnoff are 17 kilometres (11 mi) north-east of there. From here the highway heads north for 313 kilometres (194 mi), past Warmun to Victoria Highway. The national highway route turns off at Victoria Highway, travelling past Kununurra to cross into the Northern Territory. The Great Northern Highway, however, continues north-west without a route number, passing the eastern end of Gibb River Road after eight kilometres (5 mi), and reaching Wyndham following another 48 kilometres (30 mi). The highway continues on for six kilometres (4 mi) to reach the original townsite and the harbour, where it takes on the local names Odonnell Street, McPhee Street, and Harbour Road.

== History ==
=== Highway origins ===
The name Great Northern Highway was first proposed in October 1940 by the state's Nomenclature Advisory Committee, (Note: Now the Geographic Names Committee) to describe the main route from Midland to Geraldton, Western Australia. This was following the naming of the Great Eastern and Great Southern highways. The Midland Junction Municipal Council approved the name, however at the Geraldton Municipal Council meeting, one councillor suggested that the Great Midland Highway would be a better name. The reasoning was that Geraldton was in the centre of the state's coastline, not in the north. It was explained that the highway would continue north past Geraldton, and the council voted to approve the name.

By July 1941, the Nomenclature Advisory Committee's proposal had expanded to three highway names for the roads in the state's northern areas: the Great Northern Highway for "the road from Midland Junction Town Hall to Wyndham, via Walebing, Pithara, Wubin, Payne's Find, Mt. Magnet, Cue, Nannine, Meekatharra, Roy Hill, Nullagine, Marble Bar, Mulyee, De Grey, Pardoo, Wallal, Anna Plains, Le Grange, Broome, Derby, Noonkanbah, Fitzroy Crossing, Christmas Creek, Louisa Downs, Hall's Creek and Turkey Creek", North West Coastal Highway for "the road from Geraldton to De Grey, via Northampton, Galena, Carnarvon, Boolaganoo, Winning Pool, Giralia, Yanrey, Onslow, Peedamullah, Mardie, Karratha, Roebourne, Whim Creek, Mundabullangana and Port Hedland", and Geraldton Highway for "the road from Walebing to Geraldton via Mingenew". (Note: Modern-day The Midlands Road and Brand Highway) The proposal was well received by the local municipal councils and road boards.

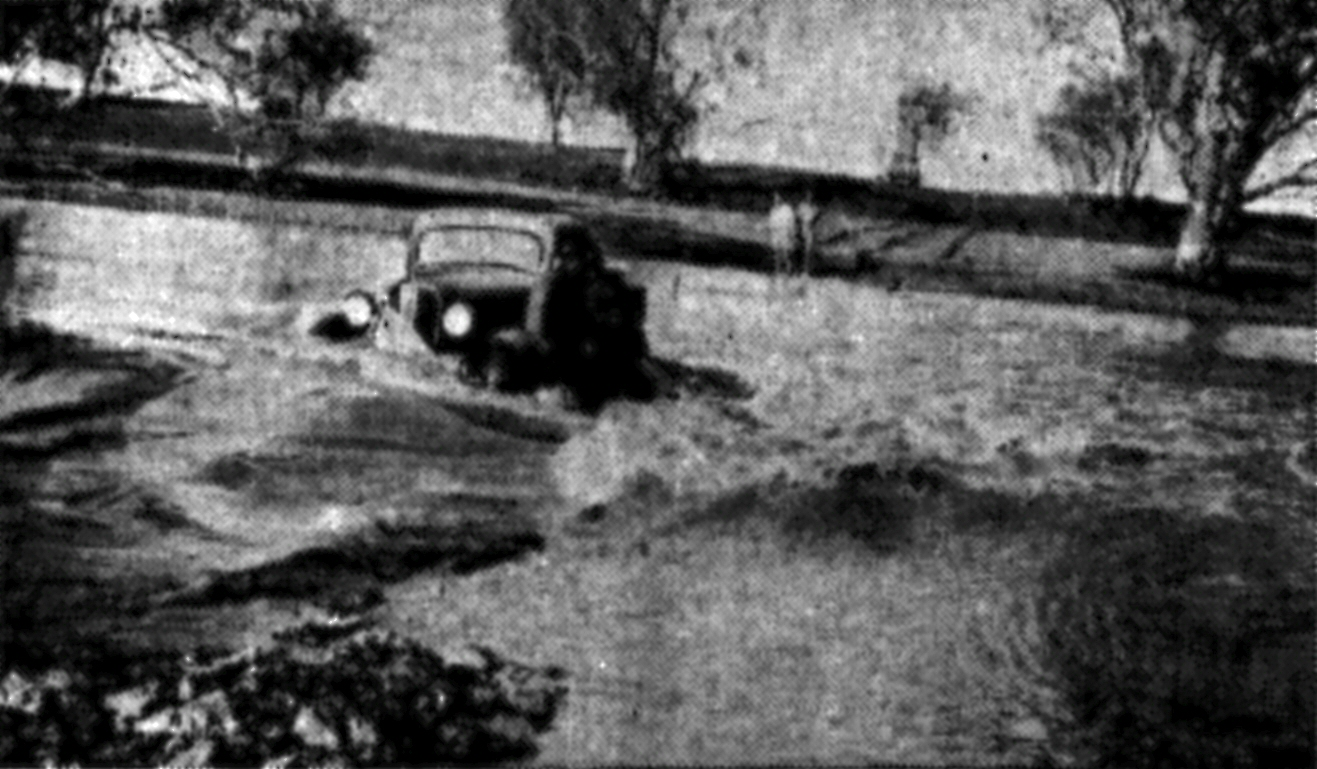
A car struggles to cross the flooded Fortescue River (February 1942).

The name Great Northern Highway was gazetted on 10 March 1944, under section 10 of the Land Act, 1933–1939. However, the highway was mostly a series of tracks through remote pastoral areas, with the sealed road ending just past the Wheatbelt town of Miling in 1950. (Note: Between 1926 and 1928, the newly formed Main Roads Board (predecessor to the Main Roads Department, later renamed Main Roads Western Australia) took over control and maintenance of the road from Midland Junction to Meekatharra, and twenty-one other important roads, which were declared "main roads". To increase the usability of the overall main road network, the work schedule for these roads prioritised sealing the worst individual segments, rather than any one road. For example, in 1928/29, twenty-two separate sections of the Perth–Albany road were improved, but the whole route was not completed until 1939.) Driving was difficult and hazardous all year round. The road was very dusty in the dry season, and some sections of the road were effectively impassable sand, while other sections contained limestone outcrops that damaged tyres. During the wet season, when rivers flooded, sections of road were essentially bogs, or worse still, were completely washed away.

=== Sealing the highway ===
==== Initial efforts ====
Economic growth and development in Western Australia's northern regions in the 1940s prompted the state to quadruple road funding between 1946 and 1952. Five "gangs" of workers were allocated to a 2,600-kilometre (1,600 mi) length of the Great Northern Highway between Meekatharra and Wyndham. However, given the vast distance the highway travelled, and destructive cyclones in the Pilbara and Gascoyne that could destroy multiple weeks worth of work, the overall improvement was relatively insignificant. Over time, though, the road was improved. New alignments were constructed, such as between Derby and Fitzroy Crossing in the late 1940s, which had originally followed the curve of the Fitzroy River, along its floodplain, and could only be used in the dry season. The new alignment was a more direct 290-kilometre (180 mi) section, with the first eight kilometres (5 mi) sealed, a total of 109 kilometres (68 mi) of gravel road, and the remainder simply formed earth. Despite this low construction standard, the road remained passable except for short periods during heavy rain.

==== Beef Roads Scheme ====
In 1961, the federal government passed the Western Australian Grants (Beef Cattle Roads) Act 1961, known as the Beef Roads Scheme, that encouraged road building in the Kimberley. This had followed on from an earlier federal grant scheme in 1949 for the construction of a road from Nicholson to Wyndham. (Note: Modern-day Duncan Road) The road allowed trucks to efficiently transport cattle to port, rather than the slow cattle drives that could lose stock and take weeks to complete. The 1961 Beef Roads Scheme initially included upgrading the Wyndham to Halls Creek section of the Great Northern Highway as one of three projects in the region. One year later the scheme was expanded to include the Broome to Halls Creek section of the highway, and several bridge construction projects. However, the resources allocated to the Great Northern Highway were needed to maintain the highway as an unsealed road in a usable condition, rather than to completely seal the roadway. In 1963, work was completed on stabilising a 68-kilometre (42 mi) sandy section to prevent vehicles from becoming bogged, a 47-kilometre (29 mi) section was realigned to avoid the Fortescue River floodplain, and 40 kilometres (25 mi) between Marble Bar and Port Hedland was also realigned to minimise the effects of wet weather.

==== Perth to Newman ====
The projects funded by the Beef Roads Scheme resulted in a noticeably higher quality road in the Kimberley, but work still progressed on other sections of the highway. In 1970, a single-lane sealed section was completed between Perth and Meekatharra. The project was one of the first in the state to be constructed by contractors rather than by Main Roads directly. It cost $9 million, two-thirds of which was spent after 1959. The next section to be upgraded and sealed was from Meekatharra to Newman, a 414-kilometre-long (257 mi) project that would take four and a half years to construct. Due to the remoteness of the location, airstrips were built alongside the highway, so that workers could be flown in from Geraldton. The highway was realigned in several spots, to avoid difficult areas, improve river crossings, or give drivers a more scenic view of the surrounding area. New bridges were constructed along the route, including a reinforced concrete bridge at the Fortescue River, and a four-span bridge over the Gascoyne River's Middle Branch. By December 1978, the sealed road reached Newman, with the project completed three months ahead of schedule, and at a cost of $20 million, $1 million under budget. With a 7.4-metre-wide (24 ft) seal and 2.4-metre-wide (8 ft) shoulders, the road could easily accommodate two lanes of traffic. Previously sealed sections, totalling 485 kilometres (301 mi) of the highway, were less than half that width. Premier Charles Court opened the new and improved highway on 12 December 1978.

==== Port Hedland to Wyndham ====
The two-lane sealed road between Halls Creek and Wyndham was also completed in 1978. It involved the construction of 21 bridges, and extensive earthworks designed to blend the road into the terrain. The section was opened on 23 July 1978 by the Minister for Transport, at a cost of over $20 million. Meanwhile, work on sealing and upgrading the 476-kilometre-long (296 mi) section from Port Hedland to Broome began in 1976. With up to five contractors and four Main Roads teams working throughout the project, it was completed at an extraordinarily rapid pace. It opened in April 1981 at a cost of $56 million. With the opening of this section, tourist traffic escalated. Cape Keraudren, Eighty Mile Beach, and Broome became increasingly favoured destinations, especially for residents of the Pilbara.

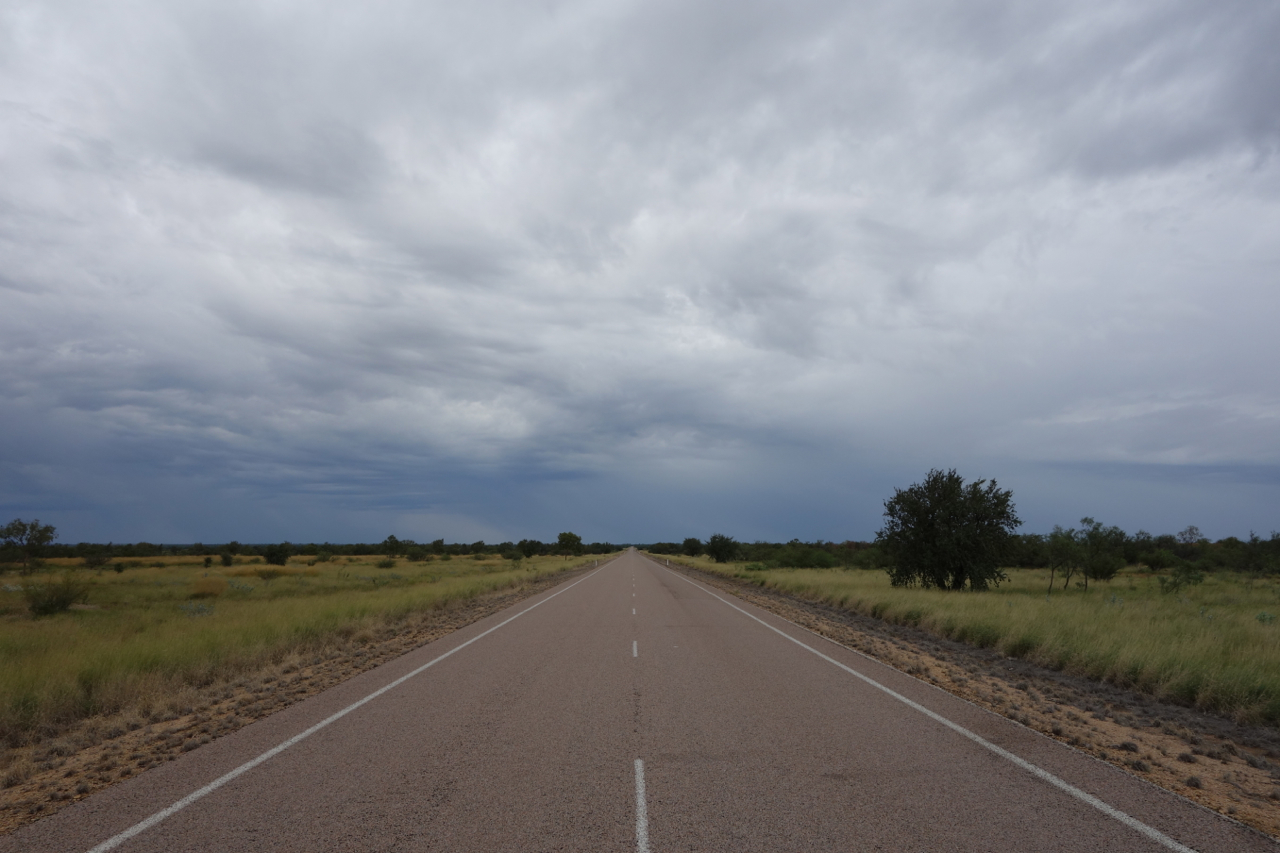
The section of the Great Northern Highway south-east of Fitzroy Crossing

Work accelerated in the 1980s as part of the Australian Bicentenary Road Development program. From October 1982, the program provided $2.5 billion to upgrade the country's roads in the lead up to Australia's bicentenary in 1988. By this time, the only sections of the Great Northern Highway yet to be sealed were a 275-kilometre (171 mi) stretch from Fitzroy Crossing to Halls Creek, and another 416 kilometres (258 mi) between Newman and Port Hedland. Construction of the Fitzroy Crossing to Halls Creek section began in October 1981. The route had been surveyed in 1979; with the collaboration of the Western Australian Museum, Main Roads ensured it would not impact important Aboriginal heritage sites. After five years of work, including the construction of nine bridges, the widened and sealed section was completed on 7 September 1986. At the time, this was the final section of the nationwide Highway 1 to be sealed, and there was national interest. The media captured the completion on camera, while the federal Minister for Transport, Peter Morris, together with the Western Australian Minister for the North West, Ernie Bridge, rode on the bitumen truck for the final spray. With this section completed, the Newman to Port Hedland section of the Great Northern Highway was the only significant section of unsealed highway in Western Australia.

==== Newman to Port Hedland ====
A realignment of the highway between Newman and Port Hedland had been proposed since 1976, which would see the road deviate to the west at Newman, and travel via Wittenoom instead of Marble Bar. In the early 1980s, eleven route corridors were investigated by Main Roads. The potential impacts on the natural environment, regional economy, tourism, and resident population were considered, with particular concern for the crossing of the Hamersley Range.

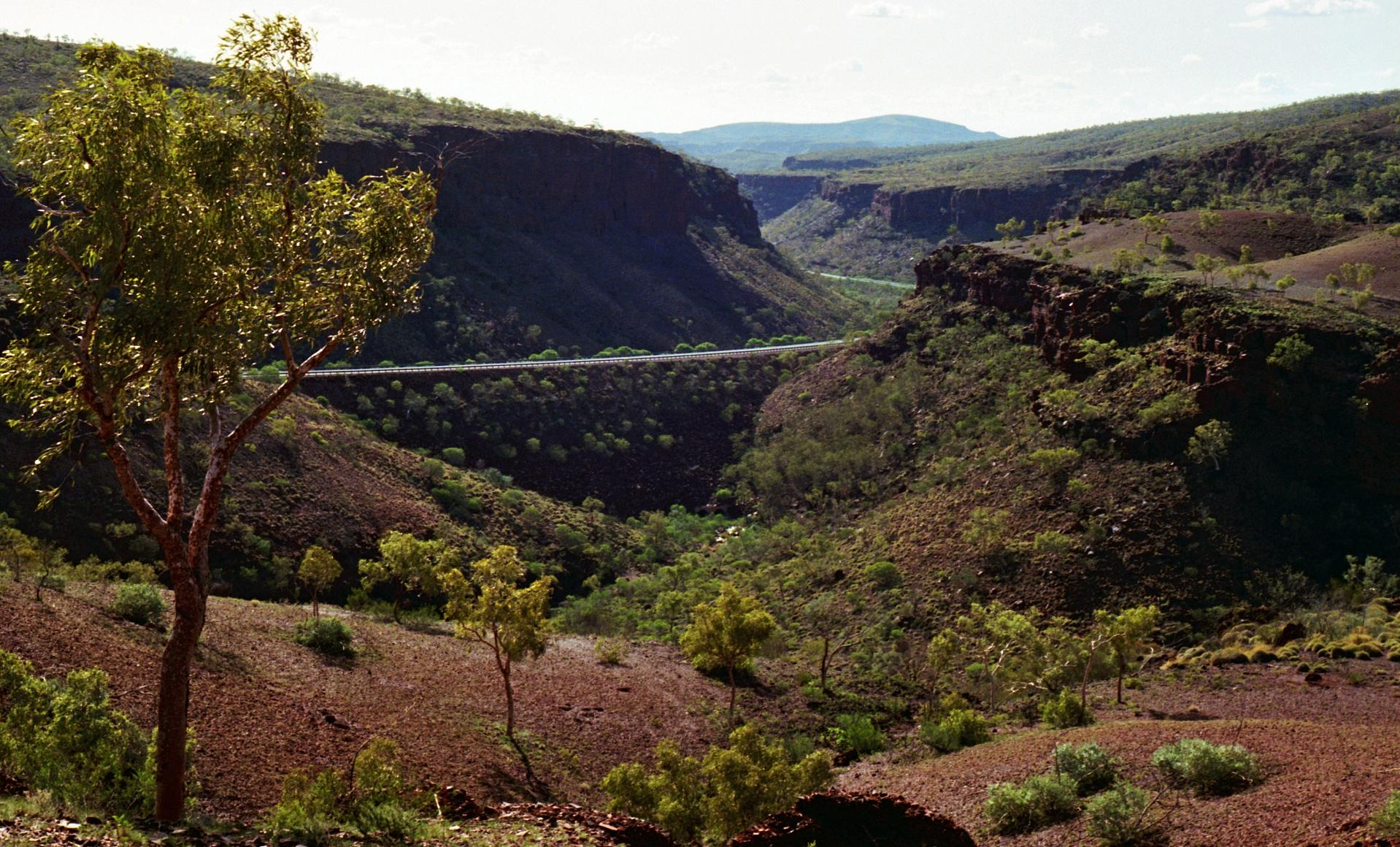
The Great Northern Highway curves down through Munjina Gorge.

As the highway would pass through the Hamersley National Park, (Note: Renamed Karijini National Park in 1991) the Environmental Protection Authority decided in 1983 that an Environment Review and Management Program report was required for the Newman to White Springs section. Consultants prepared the report for Main Roads, which found that the key risks were erosion, visual impact, and possible damage to flora. A detailed survey was carried out, which included the use of laser and infra-red measuring devices from within a helicopter, and numerous field trips to determine the final alignment and bridge sites. A comprehensive Environmental Impact Statement was then produced, and the project was approved in mid-1984.

In early 1986, the contract for this 12-kilometre (7.5 mi) segment through the Munjina and Mungina East gorges was awarded. Construction of this segment involved tight control over earthworks and machinery movements, to protect the National Park ecology. The finished road was a scenic route curving down through the Munjina Gorge and out onto the Fortescue River flood plain, with cuttings and embankments blending it in with the natural environment. It was opened on 12 June 1987 by the federal Minister for Transport, Peter Morris, having cost $28.4 million.

Other portions of the Newman – Port Hedland link were completed over the next two years, (Note: The contractors involved in the construction of the route between Newman and Port Hedland were Leighton Contractors, F.K. Kanny and Sons, Thiess Contractors, John Holland Group and Henry Walker Contracting.) with the last part officially opened on 16 December 1989 by Bob Brown and Bob Pearce, the federal and state transport ministers. This last section of the Great Northern Highway also completed the sealing of the National Highway, and the opening ceremony, held on location 212 kilometres (132 mi) south of Port Hedland, received national media coverage.

=== Fitzroy River crossing, Willare ===
In the late 1960s, Main Roads investigated alternative crossing points over the Fitzroy River, to replace the existing low-level bridge at Yeeda. Flooding in January 1966 had demonstrated that Willare was the best site. The new route would be thirteen kilometres (8 mi) longer, and required two bridges, but would result in a better quality road. When tenders were called, the river flooded again, washing away 52 metres (171 ft) of the old bridge. Rather than reconstruct the low-level crossing, the construction timeframe was shortened from 18 months to 38 weeks. The 390-metre-long (1,280 ft) Willare Bridge and 200-metre-long (660 ft) Minnie River Bridge opened on 12 June 1968, having cost almost $700,000. While situated two point one metres (6 ft 11 in) higher than the worst known flood level, the single-lane bridges were designed to accommodate more extensive flood levels, with the water flowing over them if necessary.

By the early 1980s, it was clear that the Fitzroy River crossing was still inadequate. Seasonal flooding had closed the road several times, and damaged the embankments leading up the bridges. The crossing had been closed for twenty four days in 1982; while in 1983, the most severe flooding since 1914 extensively damaged 2.6 kilometres (1.6 mi) of the highway, closing it for twenty-five days. To alleviate the problem, two new bridges were built in 1985, and the road was widened and raised two to three metres (6 ft 7 in to 9 ft 10 in) above the flood plain. The earthworks for the project included constructing guide banks to direct excess water to flow over floodways, which were protected with rocks. This was designed to minimise the time the road would be closed in such a scenario. The $11 million upgraded crossing was opened on 19 December 1985 by the federal Minister for Transport, Peter Morris. Then, one month later, Cyclone Hector produced 70% more water than the crossing had been designed for. Water overflowed the road all along the flood plain, not just at designated floodways, ravaging the shoulders and then destroying sections of road. Four to five kilometres (2.5 to 3.1 mi) of the highway was washed away, leaving the bridges isolated and disconnected. The road was closed from 27 January to 14 February 1986, with $200,000 spent just to make the crossing passable. It was then redesigned and rebuilt at a cost of $1.9 million to make it more flood resistant.

=== Further improvements ===
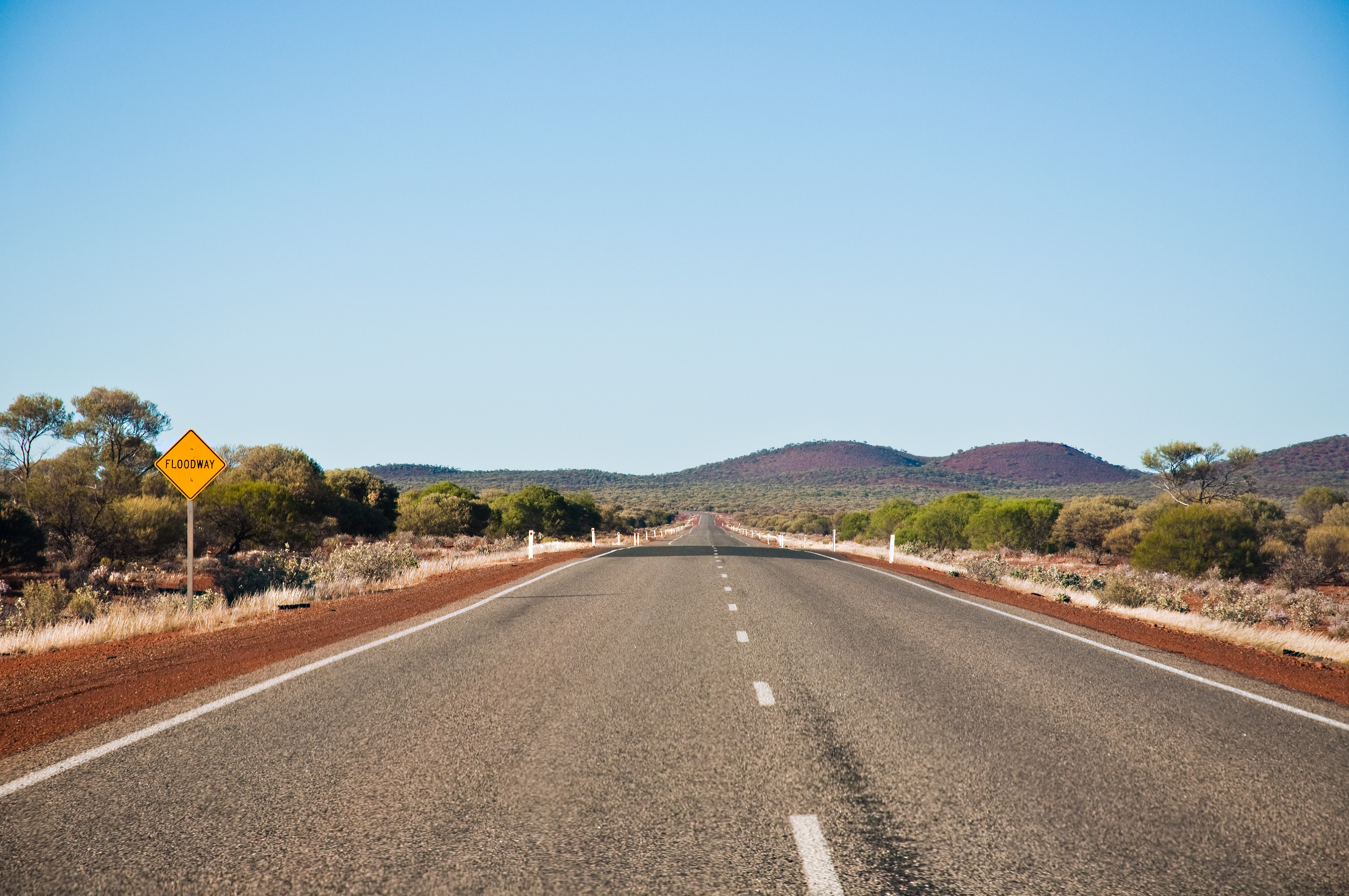
Standard two-lane road with unsealed shoulders near Paynes Find in 2010

Despite the provision of a completely sealed road, there was still much work to be done on the highway, with many older sections either worn out or not up to modern standards. Narrow sections were widened to a full seven metres (23 ft), and repairs made to the road, shoulders, fencing, and line markings as required, with work carried out in sections and progressing along the length of the highway. Four overtaking lanes were constructed between Mount Magnet and Cue in 1991; and between 1991 and 1993, there were eight contracts awarded to widen, reconstruct, and seal a combined total of more than 190 kilometres (120 mi) of the highway.

A range of projects were carried out across the length of the highway between 1996 and 2006. By 1998, a 157-kilometre (98 mi) section between the Sandfire Roadhouse and Victoria Highway had been improved at a cost of $1.1 million, and another 42 kilometres (26 mi) north of Meekatharra was improved for $12 million in 1999. Two bridges were constructed in the vicinity of Halls Creek in 2000, and another four in 2004/05, replacing floodways so that the highway would remain open during floods. Similarly, 100 kilometres (62 mi) north of Halls Creek, the 240-metre-long (0.15 mi) Jarlalu Bridge over the Ord River was constructed to replace a single-lane floodway, and was opened in January 2003. That same year, the bridges over the Fortescue and Gascoyne Rivers were strengthened to increase the highway's load capacity. Modifications were made to the steep ascent of the Darling Scarp at Bindoon Hill between February 2002 and April 2003, and the Great Northern Highway was realigned to bypass the Dalwallinu town centre.

Work on the Great Northern Highway has been continuous. From 2004 to 2010, the Muchea to Wubin section was upgraded, with parts reconstructed and realigned, and traffic lights installed at the intersection with Brand Highway. In the Kimberley, five sections between Halls Creek and Victoria Highway were improved between 2008 and 2009 with regards to pavement strength, alignment, safety, and flood resistance. From 2005 to 2010, the Perth section, through the Swan Valley, was upgraded, with the road widened, turning and overtaking lanes constructed, and street lighting improved. Construction of a realignment around Port Hedland's Wedgefield industrial area, including a new parclo interchange at Wilson Street, began towards the end of 2012. It was opened to traffic on 17 June 2014, and on 23 July 2014, Deputy Prime Minister Warren Truss, Federal Member for Durack Melissa Price, and Pilbara MLA Brendon Grylls officially opened the project. It was finalised in August. In October 2013, construction began on a project to straighten and widen the Great Northern Highway's curves around Bindi Bindi. The project was completed and opened to traffic on 27 February 2015, and allowed the speed limit to be raised from 80 to 110 km/h (50 to 70 mph). A 21-kilometre-long (13 mi) section between Batty Bog Road (north of New Norcia) and Walebing was reconstructed between September 2014 and 2015.

=== Perth Darwin National Highway ===
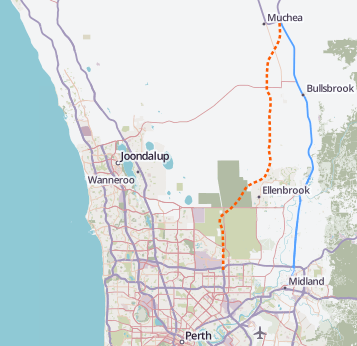
Perth Darwin National Highway Swan Valley bypass (dashed orange line)

In the early 1990s, a corridor study conducted by Main Roads into the long-term needs of the Perth to Darwin National Highway concluded the existing Great Northern Highway, with bypasses around rural towns and the Swan Valley, was the most suitable route for the National Highway. Planning the alignment for the southernmost section, from Reid Highway in Perth to Bindoon, was undertaken from 2003 to 2013. It resulted in the planned alignment commencing from Tonkin Highway, bypassing the Swan Valley and Bullsbrook before reconnecting with the Great Northern Highway near Brand Highway. The Great Northern Highway is then followed until the Brockman River, where the planned route deviates to the east to bypass Bindoon, reconnecting with the existing Highway near Bindoon–Moora Road.

The first stage of construction was undertaken as part of the NorthLink WA project. Tonkin Highway's original northern section was made grade separated, and a dual carriageway extended from the original northern end of Tonkin Highway (near Reid Highway) past Ellenbrook and through the Swan Valley to an interchange with the Great Northern Highway and a new part of Brand Highway, with the extension continuing on as the Great Northern Highway. The previously planned route of the bypass, prior to 2012, followed Lord Street, east of Whiteman Park. The project is funded by both the state and federal governments. Construction began in June 2017, and was completed on 23 April 2020.

=== Environmental hazards ===
As observed in the 2018 Broome flood, the highway, and its river crossings are always at risk in extreme weather situations.

In 2023, Rio Tinto lost a radioactive capsule somewhere along the Great Northern Highway between Perth and Newman. On 2 February 2023, the capsule was found by a search vehicle which detected its radiation south of Newman.

== Future ==
Further upgrading is planned for the Great Northern Highway towards its southern end, as well as elsewhere along the highway. Planning has been completed for widening an 11.4-kilometre (7.1 mi) section of Fitzroy Crossing, including replacing two single-lane bridges. As of 2014, the project is awaiting federal approval, and construction is unfunded.

=== Muchea to Wubin Stage 2 Upgrade ===
In late 2015 Main Roads completed a planning review for an upgrade of the highway between Muchea and Wubin. Known as Muchea to Wubin Stage 2 Upgrade, the project continues work undertaken on this section from 2000 to improve the road to National Highway standards. Several bypasses, realignments, and other improvements have been planned at or near Muchea, Bindoon, New Norcia, Walebing, Miling, Pithara, Dalwallinu, Nugadong, and Wubin. Sections near Bindi Bindi and Batty Bog, completed in 2015, were included in the review. These include the New Norcia Bypass, Miling Straight section, Muchea North section (designed to link to the NorthLink WA project), and Miling Bypass. As of November 2015, designs are being finalised for the Walebing Curve, Dalwallinu Bypass, Nugadong, and Wubin Bypass section, while funding has not been confirmed for the Bindoon upgrades.

== Further upgrades ==
The Northern Australia Roads Program announced in 2016 included three projects for the Great Northern Highway.

=== Maggie Creek to Wyndham ===
The project for widening and reconstruction works and improvements to road alignments on the Wyndham Spur was completed in mid 2019 at a total cost of $48.1 million.

=== Bow River bridge ===
The project for replacement of the existing low-level single lane bridge with a new two-lane high-level bridge was completed in late 2018 at a total cost of $23.2 million.

=== Ord River north section (stage 2) ===
The project for widening and reconstruction works, including building a new bridge over Tickalara Creek is due to complete in late 2024 at a total cost of $43.5 million.

== Beef road upgrade ==
The Northern Australia Beef Roads Program announced in 2016 included the following project for the Great Northern Highway.

=== Ord River north section (stage 1) ===
The project for widening, overlay and reconstruction works, including realigning 8 kilometres (5.0 mi) of road was completed in late 2019 at a total cost of $15.6 million.

== Major intersections ==
LGA	Location	km	mi	Destinations	Notes
Swan	Midland	0.00	0.00	Morrison Road (National Route 1 west / Tourist Drive 203 west) / Keane Street south – Perth, Midland	Southern highway terminus; traffic light intersection; National Route 1 and Tourist Drive 203 southern concurrency termini
Swan	Middle Swan	1.31	0.81	Toodyay Road (State Route 50 northeast) – Toodyay, Swan District Hospital	Traffic light intersection
Swan	Middle Swan	2.72	1.69	Roe Highway (National Highway 95 / State Route 3) east / Reid Highway (State Route 3) west – Perth, Guildford, Morley, Joondalup	Traffic light intersection; National Highway 95 southern concurrency terminus
Swan	Belhus–Upper Swan boundary	12.56	7.80	West Swan Road (State Route 52 / Tourist Drive 203) – Guildford, Ellenbrook	Traffic light controlled intersection; Tourist Drive 203 northern concurrency terminus; Tourist Drive 360 southern terminus
Swan	Bullsbrook	25.51	15.85	Chittering Road (Tourist Drive 359) – Chittering	Tourist Drive 359 southern concurrency terminus
Swan	Bullsbrook	28.20	17.52	Rutland Road (State Route 85 / Tourist Drive 359) – Wanneroo	Tourist Drive 359 northern concurrency terminus
Chittering	Muchea	36.86	22.90	Granary Drive west / Muchea East Road east – Muchea, Chittering	Traffic light intersection
Chittering	Muchea	37.50	23.30	Brand Highway (National Route 1) west / Tonkin Highway (State Route 4) southbound – Gingin, Geraldton, Ellenbrook	Roundabout interchange favouring Tonkin Highway flowing directly onto the northern continuation of Great Northern Highway and vice versa. Southbound highway traffic turns east, northbound traffic turns north; National Route 1 northern concurrency terminus
Chittering	Chittering	56.37	35.03	Chittering Road (Tourist Drive 359) – Chittering	
Chittering	Bindoon	67.53	41.96	Bindoon–Moora Road (State Route 116) – Gingin, Moora, Geraldton	
Chittering	Bindoon	72.34	44.95	Bindoon Dewars Pool Road – Toodyay	
Chittering	Wannamal	92.84	57.69	Calingiri Road – Calingiri, Wongan Hills	
Victoria Plains	Yarawindah	108.19	67.23	Mogumber–Yarawinda Road – Mogumber	
Victoria Plains	New Norcia	112.70	70.03	Calingiri–New Norcia Rd – Calingiri	
Victoria Plains	Waddington	130.55	81.12	Waddington–Wongan Hills Road – Piawaning, Wongan Hills	
Moora	Walebing	148.9	92.5	The Midlands Road (Tourist Drive 360) – Moora, Geraldton	Tourist Drive 360 northern concurrency terminus
Moora	Bindi Bindi	166.42	103.41	Bindi Bindi–Toodyay Road south – Calcarra, Toodyay	T junction: southbound highway traffic turns west, northbound traffic turns north
Moora	Miling	178.66	111.01	Miling–Moora Road – Moora	
Dalwallinu	Marne	217.09	134.89	Northam–Pithara Road (State Route 115) – Wongan Hills, Northam	
Dalwallinu	Dalwallinu	231.87	144.08	Dalwallinu–Kalannie Road east / Dalwallinu West Road west – Kalannie	
Dalwallinu	Wubin	253.45	157.49	Mullewa–Wubin Road north – Perenjori, Mullewa	T junction: northbound highway traffic turns east, southbound traffic turns south
Yalgoo	Paynes Find	408.64	253.92	Paynes Find–Sandstone Road – Sandstone	
Mount Magnet	Mount Magnet	547.47	340.18	Geraldton–Mount Magnet Road (State Route 123) – Yalgoo, Geraldton	
Mount Magnet	Mount Magnet	550.42	342.02	Mount Magnet Sandstone Road east / Richardson Street west – Sandstone, Leinster	
Meekatharra	Meekatharra	746.13	463.62	Landor–Meekatharra Road west / Roberts Street east – Gascoyne Junction, Carnarvon	
Meekatharra	Meekatharra	747.38	464.40	Goldfields Highway (State Route 132) – Wiluna, Kalgoorlie	
East Pilbara	Newman	1,162.63	722.42	Marble Bar Road (State Route 138) – Nullagine, Marble Bar	Former highway alignment
Ashburton	Juna Downs	1,322.57	821.81	Karijini Drive (State Route 142) – Tom Price, Paraburdoo, Karijini National Park	
Ashburton	Karijini	1,357.72	843.65	Nanutarra Munjina Road – Tom Price	Unsealed road
Port Hedland	Mundabullangana	1,577.03	979.92	North West Coastal Highway (National Route 1) southwest – Whim Creek, Karratha, Roebourne	Route transition: National Highway 95 northern terminus, National Highway 1 southern terminus
Port Hedland	Port Hedland–Wedgefield boundary	1,609.34	1,000.00	Wilson Street northeast / Wallwork Road southeast – Port Hedland, South Hedland	Parclo interchange
Port Hedland	Strelley	1,649.21	1,024.77	Marble Bar Road (State Route 138) – Marble Bar, Nullagine, Newman	Former highway alignment
Broome	Roebuck	2,160.97	1,342.76	Broome Road west (State Route 150) – Broome	T junction: northbound highway traffic turns east, southbound traffic turns south
Derby-West Kimberley	Willare	2,306.29	1,433.06	Derby Highway north (State Route 154) – Derby	T junction: northbound highway traffic turns east, southbound traffic turns south
Derby-West Kimberley	Wunaamin Miliwundi Ranges	2,479.64	1,540.78	Leopold Downs Road (Tourist Drive 350) – Tunnel Creek National Park, Windjana Gorge National Park	Tourist Drive 350 western concurrency terminus
Derby-West Kimberley	Fitzroy Crossing	2,523.01	1,567.73	Forrest Road (Tourist Drive 350) – Fitzroy Crossing, Geikie Gorge National Park	Tourist Drive 350 eastern concurrency terminus
Halls Creek	Mueller Ranges	2,795.11	1,736.80	Tanami Road – Alice Springs	
Halls Creek	Halls Creek	2,819.53	1,751.97	Duncan Road – Nicholson, Wave Hill	
Wyndham–East Kimberley	Lake Argyle	3,133.42	1,947.02	Victoria Highway (National Highway 1) east – Kununurra, Katherine	T junction: northbound traffic turns west, southbound traffic turns south; route transition: National Highway 1 continues south and east. State Route 155 southern terminus
Wyndham–East Kimberley	Lake Argyle	3,141.46	1,952.01	Gibb River Road (State Route 152) – Mount Barnett	
Wyndham–East Kimberley	Wyndham	3,194.66	1,985.07	Harbour Road (State Route 155)	Northern highway terminus
1.000 mi = 1.609 km; 1.000 km = 0.621 mi: Concurrency terminus; Route transition

== See also ==
- Highways in Australia
- List of highways in Western Australia
- List of major roads in rural Western Australia
- List of roadhouses in Western Australia
