= Major roads in the Kimberley region of Western Australia =

Main Roads Western Australia controls the major roads in the state's Kimberley region. Great Northern Highway is the major road connection through the region, with sealed roads spurring off it to connect to population centres, and unsealed roads offering an alternative route between Derby and Wyndham.

The region's main roads are important to the Kimberley, as roads are the only transportation mode within the region. Great Northern Highway is the only sealed road linking the region to the rest of the state, and via Victoria Highway, the rest of the country; therefore, it is particularly important for defence, freight, and tourism. Freight needs include transportation of minerals to the ports at Derby and Wyndham for the mining industry, cattle to ports or abattoirs, and produce to markets (including to the Wyndham port for export) for the agricultural industry based around the Ord River Irrigation Scheme area.

== Broome Highway ==
Broome Highway
- Location: Roebuck – Broome
- Length: 30.90 km (19.20 mi)

Broome Highway, also known as Broome Road, is a major road in the Kimberley region of Western Australia. It connects Great Northern Highway in Roebuck to the coastal town of Broome.

== Derby Highway ==
Derby Highway
- Location: Willare – Derby
- Length: 40.18 km (24.97 mi)

Derby Highway is a major road in the Kimberley region of Western Australia. From Great Northern Highway in Willare, it travels north to the western end of Gibb River Road, and then on to Derby.

== Gibb River Road ==
Gibb River Road
- Location: Derby – Lake Argyle
- Length: 646.87 km (401.95 mi)

Gibb River Road, also known as Derby Gibb River Road and Gibb River Wyndham Road, is a major north-east to south-west road in the Kimberley region of Western Australia. The road offers a more direct route between Derby and Great Northern Highway south of Wyndham than travelling on the highway itself, but is an unsealed gravel road except for short sections at either end. The road is often closed due to flooding during the wet season, which is typically November through March, although delayed openings have been known to happen, frustrating the tourism industry.

== Great Northern Highway ==
Great Northern Highway (Kimberley region)
- Location: Eighty Mile Beach – Wyndham
- Length: 1,430.72 km (889.01 mi)
- Route number: National Highway 1

Great Northern Highway is a main highway through the Kimberley region, and part of the Perth to Darwin national highway. From the south-western edge of the region at Eighty Mile Beach near the Sandfire Roadhouse, the highway travels north-east along the coast to Roebuck, east of Broome. From here it heads east to the Willare Bridge Roadhouse at the Fitzroy River, south of Derby. The highway continues east to Fitzroy Crossing, where it crosses the Fitzroy River a second time. It continues east, curving around the Margaret River to the town of Halls Creek. From here the highway heads north past Warmun to Wyndham. The national highway route, however, turns off at Victoria Highway, west of Kununurra, to cross into the Northern Territory.

== Gubinge Road ==
Gubinge Road
- Location: Broome
- Length: 7.98 km (4.96 mi)

Gubinge Road is the continuation of Broome Highway within Broome, in Western Australia's Kimberley region. It bypasses development within Broome by travelling along the western side of the town's peninsula, near Cable Beach, and connects to Port Drive near the southern end of the peninsula.

== Harbour Road ==
Harbour Road
- Location: Wyndham
- Length: 2.2 km (1.4 mi)

Harbour Road is the continuation of Great Northern Highway beyond the Wyndham townsites. The northern half of the road is restricted to authorised vehicles, for access to the harbour.

== Loch Street ==
Loch Street
- Location: Derby
- Length: 2.68 km (1.67 mi)

Loch Street is the continuation of Derby Highway within Derby, in Western Australia's Kimberley region.

== Port Drive ==
Port Drive
- Location: Broome
- Length: 5.76 km (3.58 mi)

Port Drive is a major road within Broome, in Western Australia's Kimberley region. The southern half of the road continues south from Gubinge Road to the town's main jetty at Roebuck Bay, while the northern half connects that main route to the Broome townsite.

== Victoria Highway ==
Victoria Highway (Kimberley region)
- Location: Lake Argyle & Kununurra
- Length: 87.51 km (54.38 mi)
- Route number: National Highway 1

Victoria Highway is the main road link between Western Australia and the Northern Territory, and part of the Perth to Darwin national highway. From Great Northern Highway at Lake Argyle, the highway heads east-north-east to Kununurra, where it crosses the Dunham and Ord Rivers. It then continues on in a south-westerly direction, back into the locality of Lake Argyle, until it reaches Lake Argyle Road, before heading east a short distance to the state border. There are plans for a 26-kilometre-long (16 mi) bypass around the northern side of Kununurra.

== See also ==
- List of highways in Western Australia
- List of road routes in Western Australia
- List of major roads in rural Western Australia
- Major roads in the Gascoyne region of Western Australia
- Major roads in the Mid West region of Western Australia
- Major roads in the Pilbara region of Western Australia
- Major roads in the Wheatbelt region of Western Australia
- Tourist Drives in Western Australia
