= List of road routes in Western Australia =

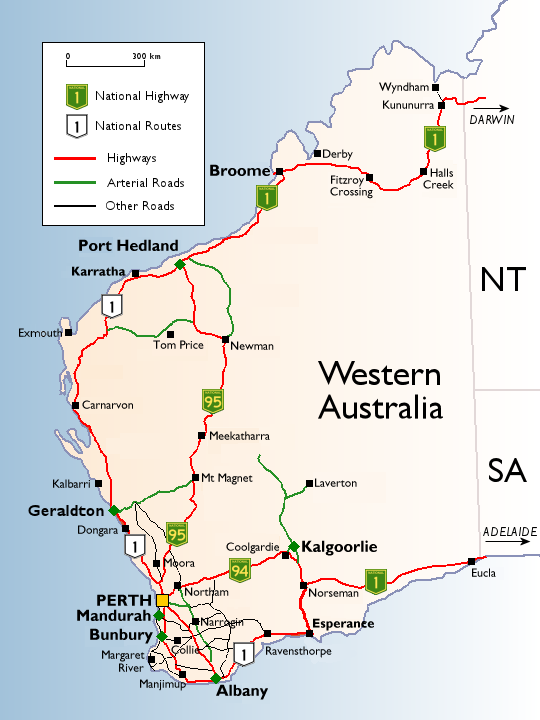
National Highways and Routes in Western Australia

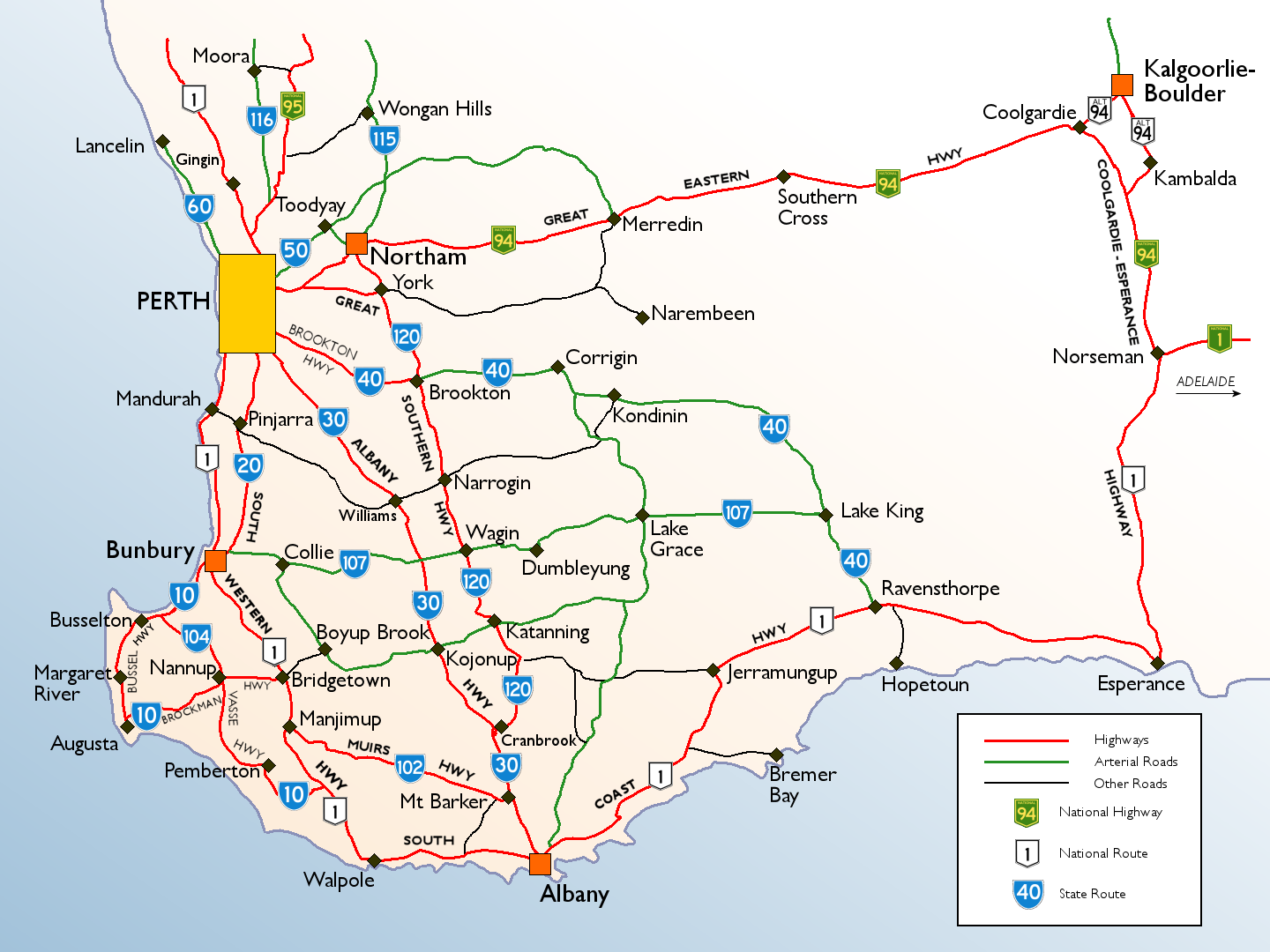
Highways in south-west Western Australia

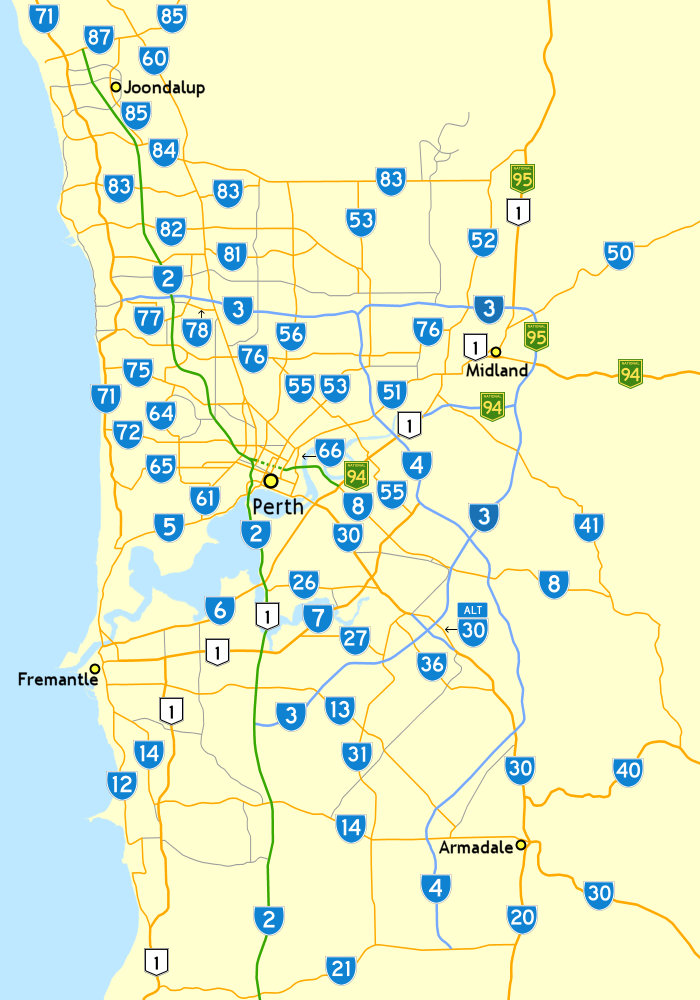
Road routes in Perth

Road routes in Western Australia assist drivers navigating roads in urban, rural, and scenic areas of the state. The route numbering system is composed of National Highways, National Routes, State Routes, and Tourist Drives. Each route has a unique number, except for National Highway 1 and National Route 1, which mark Highway 1 in Western Australia. Routes are denoted on directional signs and roadside poles by appropriately numbered markers, the design of which varies according to route type.

National Highways and National Routes are designated by the federal government along roads of national importance, whilst State Routes and Tourist Drives are designated by the State Government. Highways and some arterial roads are controlled and maintained by Main Roads Western Australia. The remaining roads are generally the responsibility of local governments, though there are also some private roads and Department of Environment and Conservation roads.

Many major roads in Perth and in rural Western Australia are not assigned a route number. Not many routes have been added in the Perth and Peel regions since the 1990s with the exceptions including the Graham Farmer Freeway in 2000 and Mandjoogoordap Drive in 2010. A subsequent review of the system was undertaken in 2024 which resulted in additional route numbers being assigned to a number of roads throughout regional Western Australia.

Western Australia is the only remaining state to use the 1950s system in full (other than there being 1 National Route), while other states have either discontinued it in favour of an alphanumeric system or switched to a cheaper hybrid system, followed by phasing out the National Highway system. There are no definite plans to stop using it.

== National Highways and Routes ==
National Highways are designated with gold numbers on a green shield. These are the most direct routes between Perth and other Australian capital cities. Black on white shields indicate National Routes that are not part of the National Highway system. Highway 1 is a route that circumnavigates Australia, joining all mainland state capitals, via roads numbered as National Highway 1 or National Route 1 (or as M1, A1, or B1 in states with an alphanumeric route numbering system).

Route	Component roads	From	Via	To	Length	Notes
National Highway 1	Victoria Highway; Great Northern Highway	WA/NT border	Halls Creek; Broome	Port Hedland	1,561 km (970 mi)	Continues west from Port Hedland as National Route 1
National Highway 1	Eyre Highway	WA/SA border	Balladonia	Norseman	720 km (447 mi)	Continues south from Norseman as National Route 1
National Highway 94	Great Eastern Highway; Great Eastern Highway Bypass; Roe Highway; Great Eastern Highway; Coolgardie–Esperance Highway	Victoria Park	Midvale; The Lakes; Northam; Southern Cross; Coolgardie	Norseman	715 km (444 mi)	
National Highway 95	Great Northern Highway; Roe Highway	Midvale	Bindoon; Dalwallinu; Mount Magnet; Meekatharra; Newman	Port Hedland	1,576 km (979 mi)	
National Route 1	North West Coastal Highway; Brand Highway; Great Northern Highway; Morrison Road; Great Eastern Highway; East Street; James Street; Johnson Street; Great Eastern Highway; Canning Highway; Kwinana Freeway; Leach Highway; Stock Road; Rockingham Road; Patterson Road; Ennis Avenue; Mandurah Road; Old Coast Road; Australind Bypass; Bunbury Bypass; South Western Highway; South Coast Highway; Chester Pass Road; South Coast Highway; Harbour Road; Norseman Road; Coolgardie–Esperance Highway	Port Hedland	Roebourne; Carnarvon; Northampton; Geraldton; Dongara; Eneabba; Gingin; Bullsbrook; Midland; Melville; Rockingham; Mandurah; Bunbury; Donnybrook; Bridgetown; Manjimup; Denmark; Albany; Ravensthorpe; Esperance	Norseman	2,903 km (1,804 mi)	Continues east from Port Hedland and Norseman as National Highway 1
Alternate National Route 94	Great Eastern Highway; Hannan Street; Goldfields Highway; Emu Rocks Road; Widgiemooltha Road	Coolgardie	Kalgoorlie; Boulder; Kambalda	Widgiemooltha	114 km (71 mi)	

== State Routes ==
State Routes in Western Australia are designated by a white number on a blue shield. Single digit routes travel completely or partially along urban freeways or highways. Two digit route numbers that end in zero are the major road routes out of Perth, except for Route 10, which designates rural highway connections in the South West region. Other two digit routes connect the urban centres of Perth, while three digit routes connect regional and remote areas of Western Australia.

Route	Component roads	From	Via	To	Length	Notes
State Route 2	Mitchell Freeway; Kwinana Freeway; Forrest Highway; Robertson Drive	Alkimos	Perth Lake Clifton	Bunbury	151 km (94 mi)	
State Route 3	Reid Highway; Roe Highway	North Beach	Middle Swan	Bibra Lake	58.6 km (36.4 mi)	
State Route 4	Tonkin Highway	Muchea	Perth Airport	Oakford	81.5 km (50.6 mi)	
State Route 5	Stirling Highway; Mounts Bay Road; Birdiya Drive; William Street; The Esplanade; Barrack Street; Riverside Drive; The Causeway	Fremantle	Perth	Victoria Park	20.3 km (12.6 mi)	(Note: "Driving directions – State Route 5" (Map). Google Maps. (westbound)) Realigned to Birdiya Drive from Mounts Bay Road in January 2022.
State Route 6	Canning Highway	Fremantle	Applecross	Victoria Park	16.1 km (10.0 mi)	
State Route 7	High Street; Leach Highway	Fremantle	Brentwood	Perth Airport	23.1 km (14.4 mi)	
State Route 8	Graham Farmer Freeway; Orrong Road; Welshpool Road East	West Perth	Wattle Grove	Carmel	24.7 km (15.3 mi)	
State Route 10	Bussell Highway; Perimeter Road	Bunbury	Karridale	Augusta	141 km (88 mi)	
State Route 10	Brockman Highway; Vasse Highway; Pemberton-Northcliffe Road; Zamia Street; Wheatley Coast Road; Middleton Road	Karridale	Nannup	Shannon	340 km (210 mi)	
State Route 12	Queen Victoria Street; James Street; Ord Street; Hampton Road; Cockburn Road	Fremantle	Henderson	Naval Base	20.7 km (12.9 mi)	
State Route 13	South Street; Ranford Road	Fremantle	Canning Vale	Haynes	25.2 km (15.7 mi)	
State Route 14	Spearwood Avenue; Beeliar Drive; Armadale Road	South Fremantle	Bibra Lake	Armadale	27.3 km (17.0 mi)	Rerouted after road upgrades and extensions
State Route 18	Patterson Road; Parkin Street; Safety Bay Road	East Rockingham	Safety Bay	Baldivis	20.3 km (12.6 mi)	
State Route 19	Mandjoogoordap Drive	Stake Hill	Meadow Springs	Mandurah	6.3 km (3.9 mi)	
State Route 20	South Western Highway	Armadale	Byford; Serpentine; Pinjarra; Waroona; Harvey	Bunbury	153 km (95 mi)	
State Route 21	Thomas Road	Kwinana Beach	Oakford	Byford	22.4 km (13.9 mi)	
State Route 22	Dixon Road; Mandurah Road; Kulija Road; Mundijong Road; Watkins Road; South Western Highway; Jarrahdale Road	Rockingham	Baldivis	Jarrahdale	49 km (30 mi)	
State Route 26	Manning Road	Manning	Bentley	Cannington	6.8 km (4.2 mi)	
State Route 27	High Road	Shelley	Riverton	Lynwood	5.5 km (3.4 mi)	
State Route 30	Shepperton Road; Albany Highway; Kenwick Link	Victoria Park	Armadale	Albany	403 km (250 mi)	
Alternate State Route 30	Albany Highway	Beckenham		Kenwick	3.5 km (2.2 mi)	Section bypassed by Kenwick Link Once mistakenly signed as Alternate National Route 30, Alternate National Highway 30 and briefly Alternate National Highway 94
State Route 31	Nicholson Road	Cannington	Forrestdale	Oakford	21.6 km (13.4 mi)	
State Route 36	Spencer Road; Corfield Street; Fremantle Road	Langford	Thornlie	Gosnells	7.8 km (4.8 mi)	
State Route 40	Brookton Highway; Brookton Corrigin Road; Kunjin Street; Corrigin Kondinin Road; Graham Street; Nicholls Street; Kondinin Hyden Road; Marshall Street; Hyden Lake King Road; Newdegate Ravensthorpe Road	Kelmscott	Brookton	Ravensthorpe	521 km (324 mi)	
State Route 41	Kalamunda Road; Canning Road	High Wycombe	Kalamunda	Karragullen	23.4 km (14.5 mi)	
State Route 50	Toodyay Road	Middle Swan	Jane Brook	Toodyay	62.5 km (38.8 mi)	
State Route 51	Hill Street (southbound); Wittenoom Street (eastbound); Lord Street; Guildford Road; Bridge Street; James Street; Great Eastern Highway; Victoria Street (westbound)	Perth	Guildford	Bellevue	18.2 km (11.3 mi)	
State Route 52	West Swan Road; Meadow Street	Belhus	Middle Swan	Guildford	15.3 km (9.5 mi)	
State Route 53	Barrack Street; Beaufort Street; Broun Avenue; Walter Road East; Beechboro Road North	Perth	Morley	Whiteman	18.5 km (11.5 mi)	
State Route 55	Grand Promenade; Whatley Crescent; Garratt Road; Grandstand Road; Stoneham Street; Belgravia Street; Fairbrother Street; Abernethy Road	Dianella	Ascot	Hazelmere	23.9 km (14.9 mi)	
State Route 56	Alexander Drive; Fitzgerald Street	Landsdale	Dianella	West Perth	16.6 km (10.3 mi)	Previously ended at Bulwer Street (State Route 72) although a 2024 update now has State Route 56 extending down to Roe Street.
State Route 60	Charles Street; Wanneroo Road; Indian Ocean Drive; Bashford Street	West Perth	Wanneroo; Lancelin; Jurien Bay	Arrowsmith	320 km (200 mi)	
State Route 61	Winthrop Avenue; Thomas Street; Loftus Street; London Street	Crawley	West Perth	Joondanna	8.4 km (5.2 mi)	
State Route 64	Cedric Street; Stephenson Avenue; Pearson Street; Flynn Street; Selby Street; Nash Street; Nicholson Road; Rokeby Road	Stirling	Osborne Park	Shenton Park	11.9 km (7.4 mi)	Previous alignment via Odin Road and Scarborough Beach Road was revoked in December 2023.
State Route 65	Rochdale Road; Stephenson Avenue; Underwood Avenue; Roberts Road (eastbound); Hay Street (westbound); Thomas Street (westbound); Wellington Street; Plain Street	City Beach	Floreat	Perth	12.7 km (7.9 mi)	
State Route 66	East Parade; Plain Street	Mount Lawley		East Perth	2.3 km (1.4 mi)	
State Route 71	Eric Street; Curtin Avenue; West Coast Highway; Marmion Avenue	Cottesloe	Hillarys; Merriwa	Yanchep	55 km (34 mi)	
State Route 72	Bulwer Street; Vincent Street; Lake Monger Drive; Grantham Street; The Boulevard	Perth	Leederville	City Beach	11.5 km (7.1 mi)	
State Route 75	Walcott Street; Green Street; Scarborough Beach Road	Mount Lawley	Osborne Park	Scarborough	13.2 km (8.2 mi)	
State Route 76	Karrinyup Road; Morley Drive; Lord Street; Benara Road	Trigg	Morley	Caversham	22 km (14 mi)	
State Route 81	Warwick Road; Wanneroo Road; Marangaroo Drive	Duncraig	Girrawheen	Ballajura	11.4 km (7.1 mi)	
State Route 82	Hepburn Avenue	Hillarys	Madeley	Cullacabardee	18 km (11 mi)	Route number extended from Wanneroo Road to Tonkin Highway in 2019
State Route 83	Whitfords Avenue; Wanneroo Road; Gnangara Road	Duncraig	Woodvale	Landsdale	8.4 km (5.2 mi)	Shortened after road upgrades and extensions
State Route 84	Ocean Reef Road; Gnangara Road	Ocean Reef	Mullaloo	Henley Brook	27.1 km (16.8 mi)	Rerouted after road upgrades and extensions
State Route 85	Joondalup Drive; Neaves Road	Edgewater	Joondalup	Bullsbrook	34.3 km (21.3 mi)	Previously extended to Great Northern Highway via Railway Parade and Rutland Road until 2019
State Route 87	Burns Beach Road	Burns Beach	Kinross	Neerabup	4.8 km (3.0 mi)	
State Route 101	Wilman Wadandi Highway	Australind	Picton East	Gelorup	27 km (17 mi)	Added as part of the 2024 expansion.
State Route 102	Muir Highway	Manjimup	Rocky Gully	Mount Barker	162 km (101 mi)	
State Route 103	Menang Drive	Mount Melville		King River	16.4 km (10.2 mi)	Added as part of the 2024 expansion.
State Route 104	Vasse Highway	Busselton	Jarrahwood	Nannup	60 km (37 mi)	
State Route 107	Coalfields Highway; Albany Highway; Arthur Road; Wagin Dumbleyung Road; Dumbleyung Lake Grace Road; Lake Grace Newdegate Road; Newdegate-Ravensthorpe Road	Roelands	Wagin	Lake King	408 km (254 mi)	
State Route 115	Northam–Pithara Road	Northam	Wongan Hills	Pithara	152 km (94 mi)	
State Route 116	Bindoon–Moora Road; The Midlands Road	Bindoon	Mingenew	Dongara	326 km (203 mi)	
State Route 120	Northam–Toodyay Road; Northam York Road; Great Southern Highway	Toodyay	Northam; Brookton; Katanning	Cranbrook	382 km (237 mi)	
State Route 123	Geraldton–Mount Magnet Road	Geraldton	Mullewa; Yalgoo; Sandstone	Mount Magnet	335 km (208 mi)	
State Route 132	Goldfields Highway	Meekatharra	Wiluna; Leonora; Kalgoorlie	Kambalda	789 km (490 mi)	Added as part of the 2024 expansion.
State Route 136	Nanutarra Munjina Road; Paraburdoo Road; Camp Road; Rocklea Road; Tom Price Road	Nanutarra	Paraburdoo	Tom Price	339 km (211 mi)	Shortened in 2024 as part of the regional route expansion. Previously routed via the mostly unsealed Nanutarra-Wittenoom Road.
State Route 138	Marble Bar Road	Newman	Marble Bar	Port Hedland	434 km (270 mi)	Approx 230 km is unsealed road
State Route 139	Red Bluff Road; George Grey Drive; Port Gregory Road	Northampton	Port Gregory	Kalbarri	100 km (62 mi)	Route signposted in March 2016 and extended to include Red Bluff Road in 2023
State Route 142	Manuwarra Red Dog Highway; Tom Price Road; Karijini Dirve	Karratha	Tom Price	Juna Downs	25 kilometres (16 mi) + 137 kilometres (85 mi)	Not yet completed, signposted at each end.
State Route 150	Broome Road; Gubinge Road; Port Drive	Minyirr	Broome	Roebuck	41.7 km (25.9 mi)	Added as part of the 2024 expansion.
State Route 151	Broome-Cape Leveque Road; One Arm Point Road	Broome	Cape Leveque	Ardyaloon	207 km (129 mi)	Added as part of the 2024 expansion.
State Route 152	Gibb River Road	Derby		Wyndham	660 km (410 mi)	Added as part of the 2024 expansion.
State Route 154	Derby Highway; Loch Street	Willare		Derby	43 km (27 mi)	Added as part of the 2024 expansion.
State Route 155	Great Northern Highway; O'Donnell Street; Harbour Road	Kununurra		Wyndham	62 km (39 mi)	Added as part of the 2024 expansion.

== Tourist Drives ==
Tourist Drives, designated by white numbers on a brown shield, are routes through areas of scenic or historic significance. Tourist Drives were introduced into Western Australia while Eric Charlton was the state government Minister for Transport in the 1990s. The 28 numbered routes collectively traverse more than 2,000 kilometres (1,200 mi) across the state. In addition to the Tourist Drives, there are also unnumbered routes such as the Golden Pipeline Heritage Trail, and local governments may designate and maintain local scenic drives, generally unnamed and unnumbered.

Route	Component roads	From	Via	To	Length	Notes
Kings Park Tourist Drive 200	Fraser Avenue; Forrest Drive; Lovekin Avenue; May Drive	Kings Park Road / Malcolm Street	Botanical Gardens; Synergy Parkland	State War Memorial	7 km (4.3 mi)	Kings Park circular routeDecommissioned
John Forrest Tourist Drive 201	Park Road	Great Eastern Highway, Darlington	Glen Brook Dam; Mahogany Creek Dame	Great Eastern Highway, Glen Forrest	10 km (6.2 mi)	Route through John Forrest National Park
Rockingham Coastal Tourist Drive 202	Kwinana Beach Road; Rockingham Beach Road; Harrison Street; Val Street; The Esplanade; Hymus Street; Point Peron Road; Memorial Drive; Lease Road; Arcadia Drive; Safety Bay Road	Kwinana Beach	Point Peron; Safety Bay	Warnbro	24 km (15 mi)	Rockingham coastal route
Swan Valley Tourist Drive 203	Meadow Street; West Swan Road; Great Northern Highway; Morrison Road; Great Eastern Highway; Terrace Road; Swan Street	Guildford	West Swan; Belhus; Midland	Guildford	31 km (19 mi)	Swan Valley circular route
Sunset Coast Tourist Drive 204	Stirling Highway; Tydeman Road; Port Beach Road; Curtin Avenue; Marine Parade; North Street	Stirling Bridge, North Fremantle	Cottesloe	Swanbourne	38 km (24 mi)	Route along Perth's northern beaches
Sunset Coast Tourist Drive 204	Challenger Parade; West Coast Highway; Karrinyup Road; West Coast Drive; Whitfords Avenue; Northshore Drive; Oceanside Promenade; Ocean Reef Road	City Beach	Scarborough; Trigg; North Beach; Hillarys; Mullaloo	Ocean Reef	38 km (24 mi)	Route along Perth's northern beaches
Heritage Country Tourist Drive 205	Albany Highway; Carradine Road; Canns Road; Churchman Brook Road; Soldiers Road; Brookton Highway; Croyden Road; McNess Drive; Canning Dam Road; Albany Highway; Springfield Road; Admiral Road; Albany Highway	Armadale	Churchman Brook Reservoir; Canning Dam; Wungong Dam	Armadale	44 km (27 mi)	Darling Range dams circular route
Kingsbury Tourist Drive 206	Kingsbury Drive; South Western Highway; Jarrahdale Road	Jarrahdale	Serpentine Dam; Serpentine; Serpentine National Park	Jarrahdale	45 km (28 mi)	Jarrah forest circular route
Darling Range Tourist Drive 207	Mundaring Weir Road	Mundaring	Mundaring Weir	Kalamunda	25 km (16 mi)	Mundaring Weir route
Caves Road Tourist Drive 250	Cape Naturaliste Road; Caves Road; Bussell Highway; Blackwood Avenue; Leeuwin Road	Cape Naturaliste	Dunsborough; Yallingup; Augusta	Cape Leeuwin	123 km (76 mi)	Cape Naturaliste–Cape Leeuwin coastal route
Blackwood River Tourist Drive 251	Balingup–Nannup Road; Grange Road; Brockman Highway	Balingup	Nannup	Bridgetown	87 km (54 mi)	Blackwood River route. The direct route from Balingup to Bridgetown is along South Western Highway.
Porongurup Tourist Drive 252	Oaklands Road; Mount Barker–Porongurup Road	Mount Barker	Porongurup	Chester Pass Road east of Porongurup	30 km (19 mi)	Porongurup National Park route
Avon Historic Tourist Drive 254	Toodyay Road; Northam–Toodyay Road; Katrine Road; Taylor Street; Fitzgerald Street; Burlong Road; Spencers Brook Road; Spencers Brook–York Road; Avon Terrace; Balladong Street; York Road; Top Beverley Road; Great Southern Highway	Toodyay	Northam; York	Beverley	98 km (61 mi)	Avon River route
Scotsdale Tourist Drive 255	Scotsdale Road; Mount Mcleod Rd; South Coast Highway; William Bay Road	Denmark	Scotsdale	Greens Pool	35 km (22 mi)	
Lake Argyle Tourist Drive 256	Lake Argyle Road	Victoria Highway near WA/NT border		Lake Argyle	34 km (21 mi)	
Albany Historic Tourist Drive 257	Marine Drive; Burgoyne Road; Cuddihy Road; Brunswick Road West; Stirling Terrace; Residency Road	Middleton Beach	Mount Adelaide; Princess Royal Fortress; Lawley Park	Western Australian Museum – Albany	6 km (3.7 mi)	Albany coastal route
Frenchman Bay Tourist Drive 258	Frenchman Bay Road	Torndirrup		Frenchman Bay	7 km (4.3 mi)	Route through Torndirrup National Park
Karri Tourist Drive 259	Gilbert Street; Chopping Street; South Western Highway; Eastbourne Road; Diamond Tree Road; Pemberton North Road; Vasse Highway; Pemberton Northcliffe Road; Zamia Street; Wheatley Coast Road	Manjimup	Pemberton; Northcliffe	South Western Highway near Quinninup	88 km (55 mi)	Karri forest route
Australind Bunbury Tourist Drive 260	Old Coast Road; Estuary Drive	Leschenault	Australind; Pelican Point	Bunbury	14 km (8.7 mi)	
Geikie–Windjana Tourist Way 350	Geikie Gorge Road; Russ Road; Forrest Road; Great Northern Highway; Leopold Downs Road; Fairfield–Leopold Downs Road	Geikie Gorge National Park	Fitzroy Crossing; Tunnel Creek National Park; Windjana Gorge National Park	Derby Gibb River Road near Lennard River	166 km (103 mi)	Only accessible in the dry season, from April to November
Cossack Tourist Way 351	Burrup Road; Dampier Highway; Karratha Road; North West Coastal Highway; Point Samson–Roebourne Road; Cossack Road	Burrup Peninsula	Dampier; Karratha; Roebourne; Cossack (via spur)	Point Samson	77 km (48 mi)	North West Shelf coastal route
Cape Range Tourist Way 352	Minilya–Exmouth Road; Murat Road; Laermonth Minilya Road; Yardie Creek Road	Learmonth	Exmouth	Yardie Creek in Cape Range National Park	121 km (75 mi)	North West Cape coastal route
Shark Bay Tourist Way 353	Shark Bay Road; Monkey Mia Road	Overlander Roadhouse	Hamelin Pool; Denham	Monkey Mia	155 km (96 mi)	Shark Bay route
Batavia Coast Tourist Way 354	Brand Highway; North West Coastal Highway; Kalbarri Road; Clotworthy Street; Grey Street; Red Bluff Road; George Grey Drive	Dongara	Greenough; Northampton; Kalbarri	Kalbarri National Park (south of Kalbarri)	244 km (152 mi)	
Collie Tourist Way 355	Coalfields Highway; Throssell Street; Cameron Road; Gibbs Road; Coalfields Road; Centaur Rd	South Western Highway near Roelands	Collie	Collie River in Muja	57 km (35 mi)	
Great Southern Tourist Way 356	Great Southern Highway; Albany Highway	Beverley	Pingelly; Narrogin; Wagin; Katanning; Cranbrook; Mount Barker	Albany	381 km (237 mi)	Great Southern Railway route
Goldfields Tourist Way 357	Great Eastern Highway	Coolgardie Camel Farm, 4 km (2.5 mi) west of Coolgardie	Coolgardie	Kalgoorlie	45 km (28 mi)	Goldfields route. Superseded by the Golden Pipeline Heritage Trail.
Esperance Tourist Way 358	Norseman Road; Dempster Street; Harbour Road; Smith Street; Twilight Beach Road; Eleven Mile Beach Road	Esperance	Blue Haven Beach; Twilight Beach; Nine Mile Beach	Pink Lake	30 km (19 mi)	Route along the Esperance coast and Pink Lake; forms most of a loop route (Pink Lake Road joins the two ends)
Chittering Valley Tourist Way 359	Pinjar Road; Joondalup Drive; Neaves Road; Muchea South Road; Rutland Road; Great Northern Highway; Chittering Road; Chittering Valley Road; Chittering Road	Ashby (north of Wanneroo)	Bullsbrook	Chittering	70 km (43 mi)	Gnangara-Moore River State Forest and Chittering Valley route
Midlands Tourist Way 360	Great Northern Highway; The Midlands Road	Upper Swan	Bullsbrook; Bindoon; New Norcia; Moora	Watheroo National Park	204 km (127 mi)	

== Decommissioned routes ==
Whilst the following routes are decommissioned, the component roads generally still exist as physical roads, but without route signposts.

Route	Component roads	From	Via	To	Length	Notes
State Route 34	Cornwall Street; Orrong Road	Rivervale		Kewdale	8.1 km (5.0 mi)	Replaced by State Route 8
State Route 35	Welshpool Road	East Victoria Park	Welshpool	Carmel	16.1 km (10.0 mi)	Replaced by State Route 8 (east of Roe Highway only).
State Route 77	North Beach Road; Erindale Road	Gwelup	Balcatta	Warwick	8.4 km (5.2 mi)	Revoked in March 2024. Replaced by Reid Highway
State Route 86	Pinjar Road; Neaves Road; Muchea South Road; Rutland Road	Ashby	Mariginiup	Bullsbrook	28 km (17 mi)	Replaced by Tourist Drive 359 (entire length) and State Route 85 on all but Pinjar Road.

== See also ==
- List of major roads in Perth, Western Australia
- List of major roads in rural Western Australia
- List of highways in Western Australia
