= Derby Highway =

Highway in Western Australia

Derby Highway Western Australia

General information
- Type: Highway
- Length: 42 km (26 mi)
- Route number(s): State Route 154

Major junctions
- North end: Loch Street, Derby
- Gibb River Road
- South end: Great Northern Highway (National Highway 1), south of Derby

Highway system
- Highways in Australia; National Highway • Freeways in Australia; Highways in Western Australia

Derby Highway is a highway linking Great Northern Highway in Western Australia with the town of Derby. It is a 42-kilometre-long (26 mi) 2-lane single carriageway. In the town of Derby, its name changes to Loch Street, where it becomes a 2-lane divided carriageway.

The RAAF Curtin inactive air force base is situated adjacent to Derby Highway near the intersection of Great Northern Highway. The base has been previously used as a refugee detention centre and civilian airport, but is not presently used for any functional purpose.

== Tourism ==
Derby Highway is the western terminus of the popular Gibb River Road. It is also a useful access for many local fishing "secret spots" at the mouth of the Fitzroy River, with one of the better known ones being the Cuttings.

== Reconstruction ==
A staged reconstruction of the highway has been taking place in recent years. So far, approximately 15 kilometres (9.3 mi) of the highway has been reconstructed and widened, with plans for the remainder to be completed in the near future.

== See also ==
- Highways in Australia
- List of highways in Western Australia
