= Municipality of Broome =

Former local government area in Western Australia

The Municipality of Broome was a local government area in Western Australia centred on the coastal town of Broome. It existed from 1904 to 1918.

== Establishment ==
It was established on 30 September 1904, separating the township of Broome from the original Broome Road District (1901–1908), which surrounded the town.

The first election was held on 22 November 1904, with William Lowes, a former mayor of the Municipality of Kanowna far inland, becoming the first Mayor of Broome. The council consisted of a directly elected mayor and nine councillors. The council chambers were based in the town's Literary Institute.

== In operation ==
A state government proclamation in August 1906 banned Aboriginal people and "half-castes" "not in lawful employment" from the entire municipality.

The municipality assumed control of Broome's relatively new bore water supply, initially established by the state government, c. 1907–09.

In 1908, the council administered the "Nor'West Typhoon Distress Fund" to assist with the Broome area's recovery from a devastating hurricane.

In 1910, the council protested the establishment of a Japanese Hospital to serve Japanese migrant workers in Broome, arguing that there would be inadequate revenue for health facilities without Japanese admissions and opposing having "a full-fledged medical practitioner of another race".

The council received positive attention elsewhere for what was reported as a strong financial position during the World War I years; in 1914 it was described as having "a credit balance of £342 3s 7d, assets valued at £1,450, and no liabilities", while in 1916 it was reported to be "without debt and [having] a credit balance of nearly £300", for which it was "probably the most unique municipality of the State". However, the same period was associated with a severe downturn in the pearling industry, which resulted in attempts to retrench the existing town clerk and to abolish the positions of health inspector and librarian in 1915. By 1917, it was reported that the municipality's credit balance was "quickly disappearing".

In 1916, the municipality was reported to have a town water system with seven miles of reticulation pipes, serviced from two 1500 ft deep bores, but to be "deficient in respect to lighting" with "no attempt at street illumination", reportedly due to widespread private use of acetylene light. By January 1918, however, the bore scheme was experiencing severe supply problems.

== Amalgamation ==
The Municipality of Broome ceased to exist on 13 December 1918 when it was merged into the West Kimberley Road District. One week later, on 20 December 2018, the Broome Road District was re-established, separating the broader Broome area from the West Kimberley district and establishing the body that later evolved into the modern Shire of Broome. The amalgamation and formation of the new road board followed a local campaign for that outcome on economic grounds, including a requisitioned public meeting and a formal petition to the state government. There were concerns raised regarding continued local control of the water supply, which was guaranteed, and the area of the new road board being much smaller than initially requested, which remained the same despite protests. The last mayor of the municipality strongly opposed the merger, and the council was persuaded to support a last-minute attempt to postpone the merger due to the issue of the proposed size. The former Municipality of Broome became the Broome ward of the Broome Road District.

Arthur Male was mayor of the council in 1905 and 1908–1909, while Sydney Pigott also served as a councillor.
