= Bilingurr =

- Suburb
- Interactive map of Bilingurr
- Coordinates: 17°55′30″S 122°14′02″E
- Country: Australia
- State: Western Australia
- City: Broome
- LGA: Shire of Broome

Government
  - State electorate: Kimberley
  - Federal division: Durack

Area
  - Total: 13.1 km^{2} (5.1 sq mi)

Population
  - Total: 1,540 (SAL 2021)
- Postcode: 6725
Suburbs around Bilingurr
Cable Beach	Bilingurr
	Djugun

Bilingurr is a northern suburb of Broome, Western Australia within the local government area of the Shire of Broome. Its population has increased from 231 at the 2006 Census to 1,354 at the 2016 census.

== Facilities ==
Broome North Primary School is located within the suburb.
