= Gibb River Road =

Track in Western Australia

Gibb River Road Western Australia
- Kimberley region map displaying the Gibb River Road route

General information
- Type: Rural road
- Length: 660 km (410 mi)
- Route number(s): State Route 152

Major junctions
- Southwest end: Derby Highway (State Route 154), Derby
- Northeast end: Great Northern Highway (State Route 155), Lake Argyle

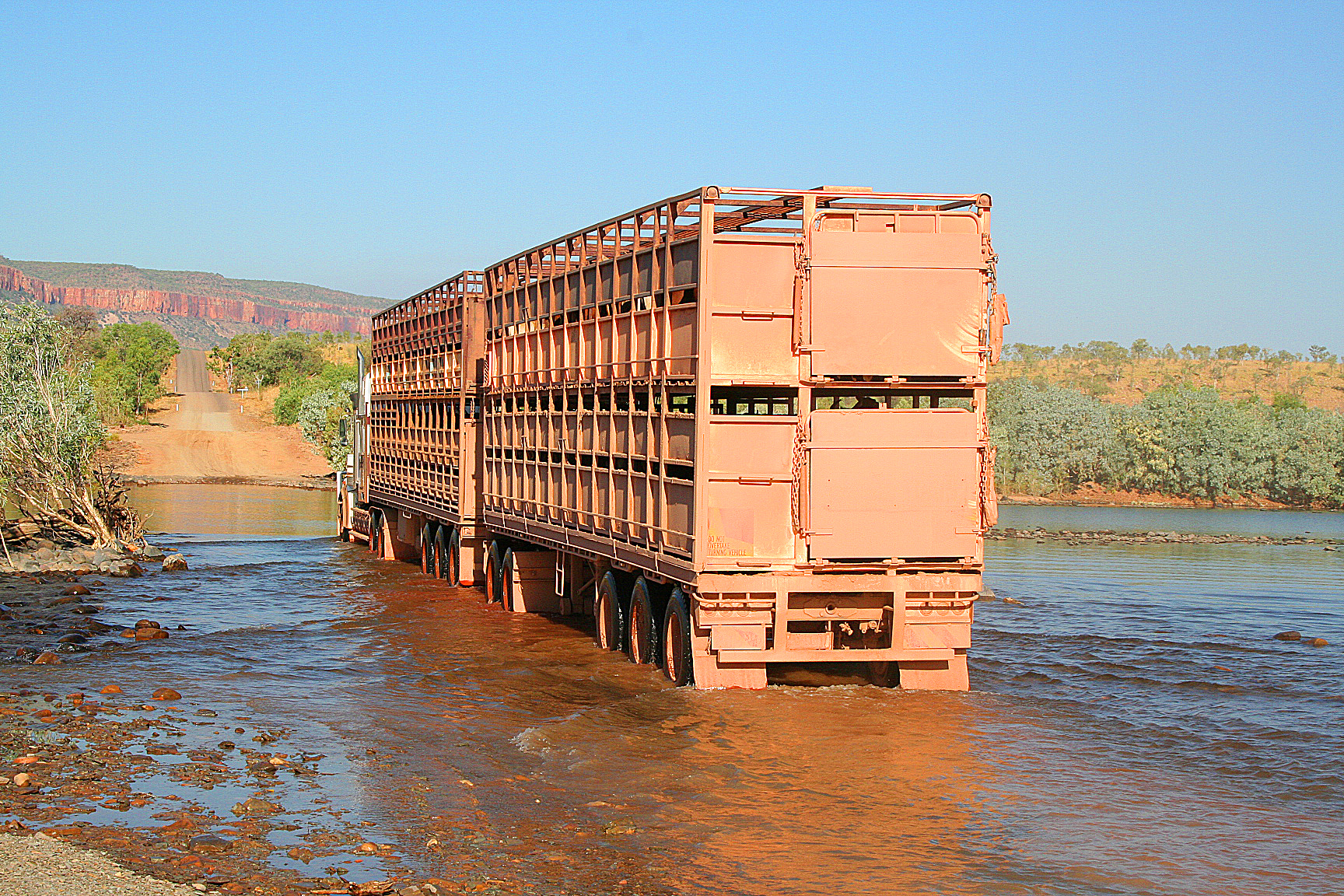
Road train on the Gibb River Road

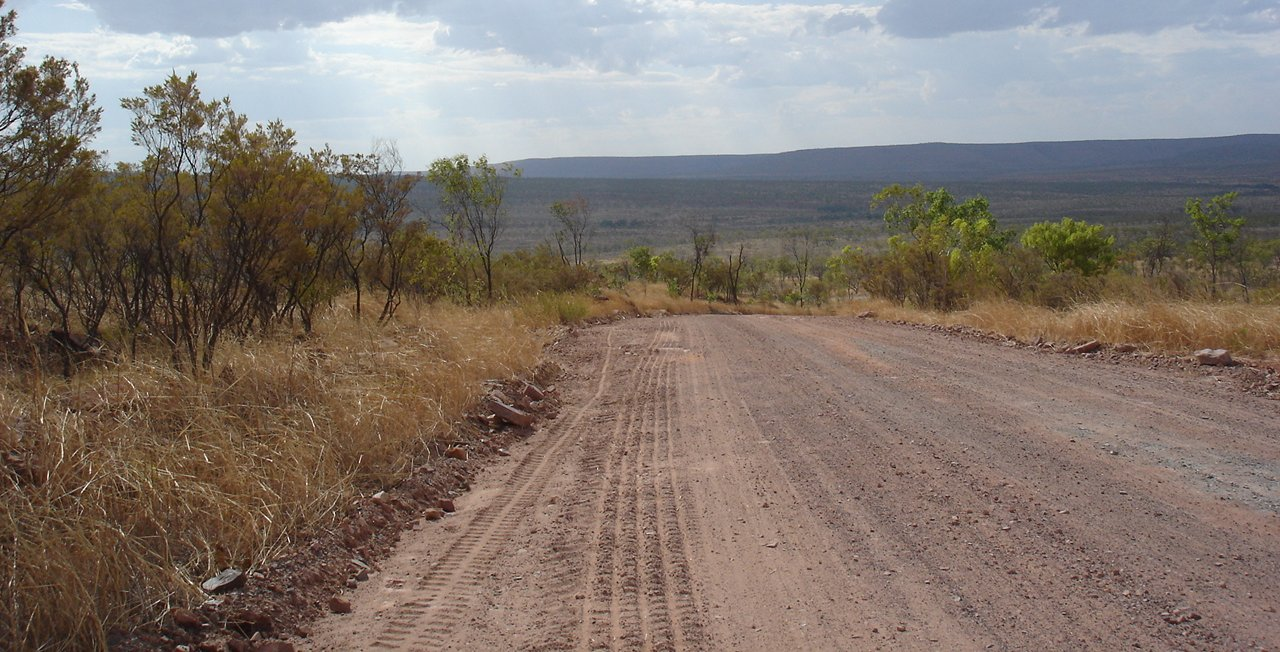
Stretch of the Gibb River Road

The Gibb River Road is a road in the Kimberley region of Western Australia.

== Description ==
The road is a former cattle route that stretches in an east–west direction almost 660 kilometres (410 mi) through the Kimberley between the towns of Derby and the Kununurra and Wyndham junction of the Great Northern Highway. Like its namesake river, which does not actually cross the road but runs nearby at 16°06.108′S 126°31.075′E, it is named after geologist and explorer Andrew Gibb Maitland. The Gibb River Road is one of the two major roads which dissect the Kimberley region—the other being the extreme northern section of Great Northern Highway which runs further to the south.

The road is often closed due to flooding during the wet season, which is typically November through March, although delayed openings have been known to happen, frustrating the tourism industry as well as locals who rely on the road. Since the mid-2000s, the road has been upgraded to a formed gravel two-lane road including a few short bitumenised sections, but 4WD vehicles are still recommended due to the water crossings and numerous heavily corrugated sections.

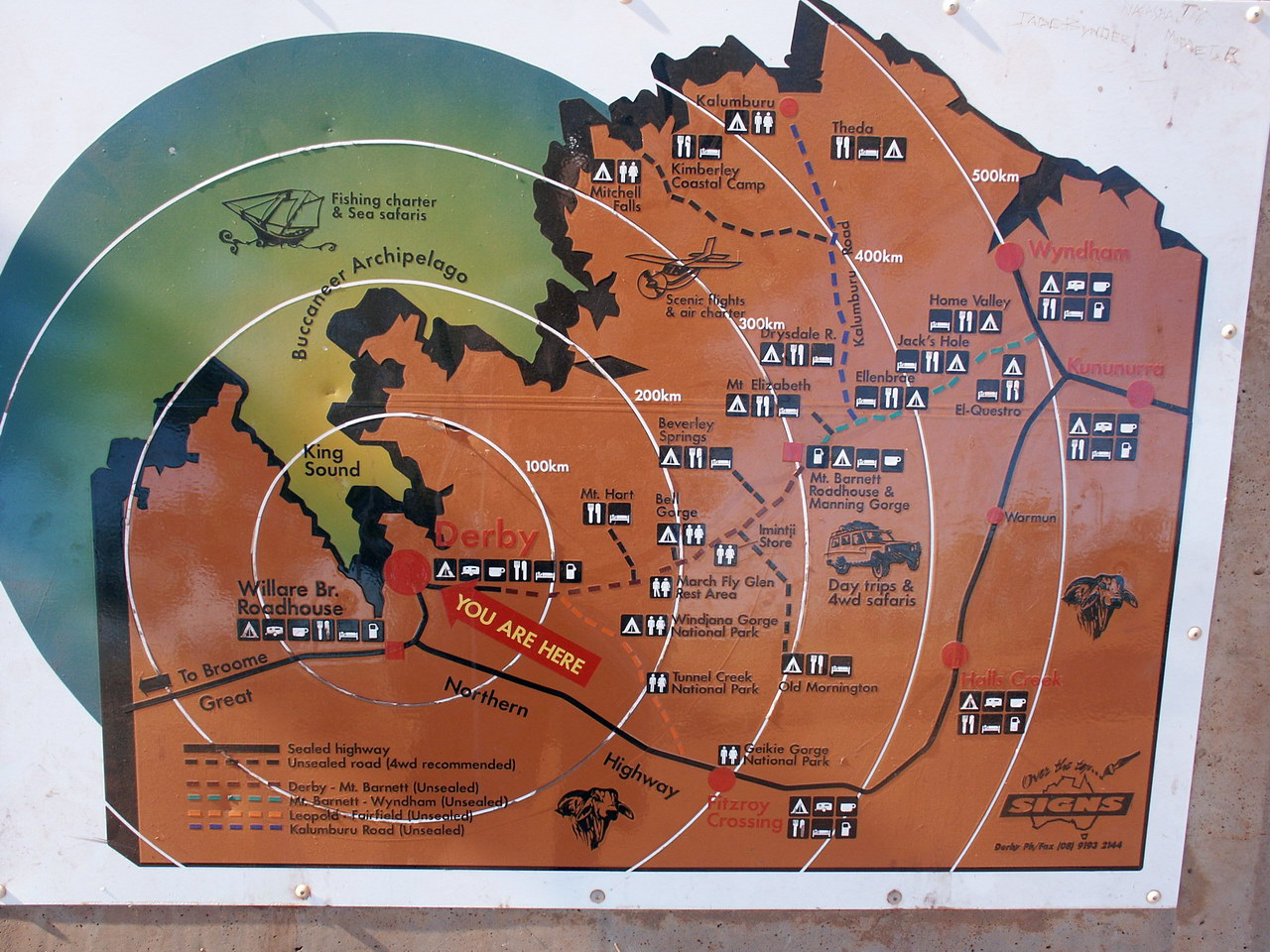
Map

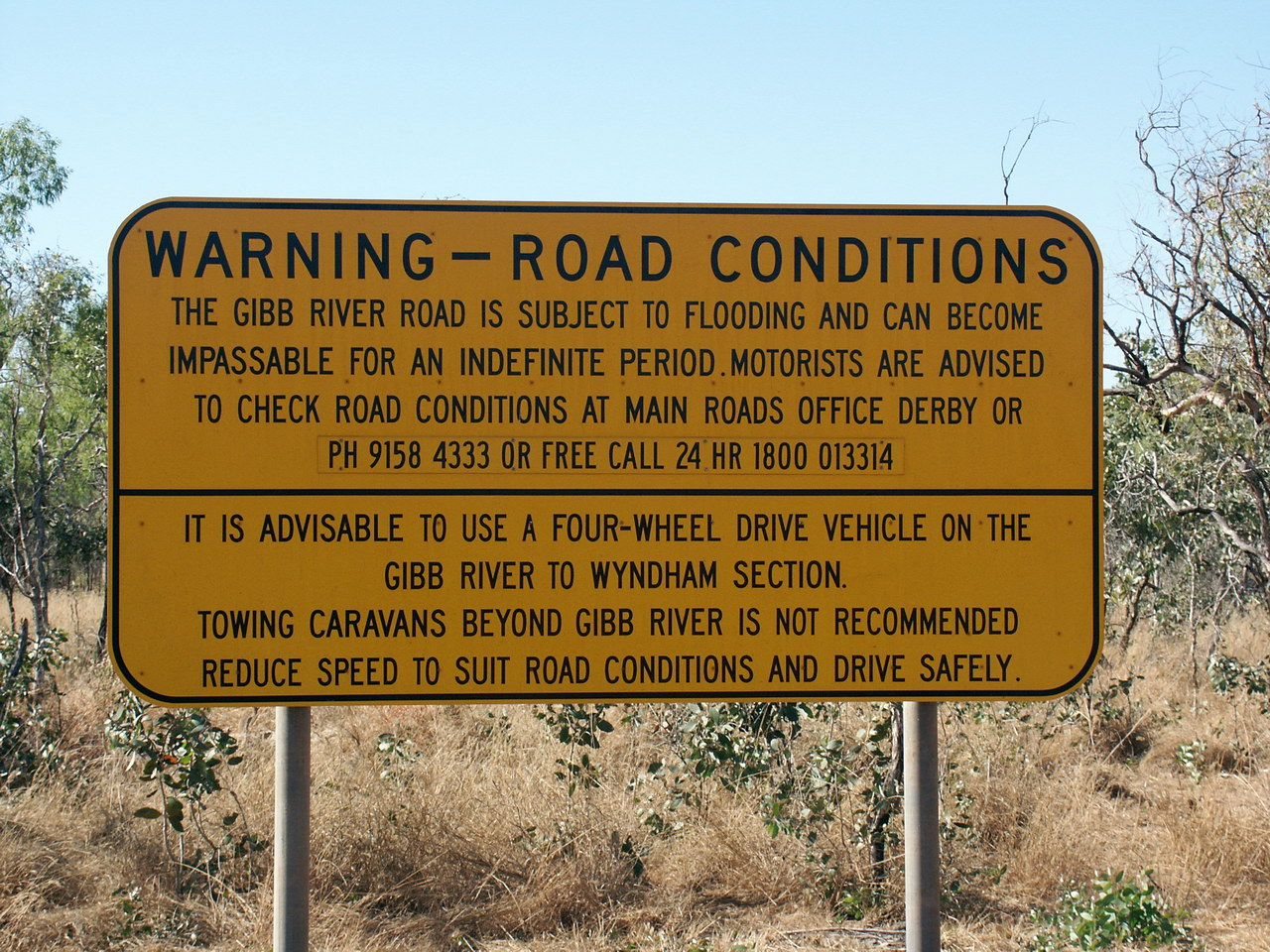
Sign

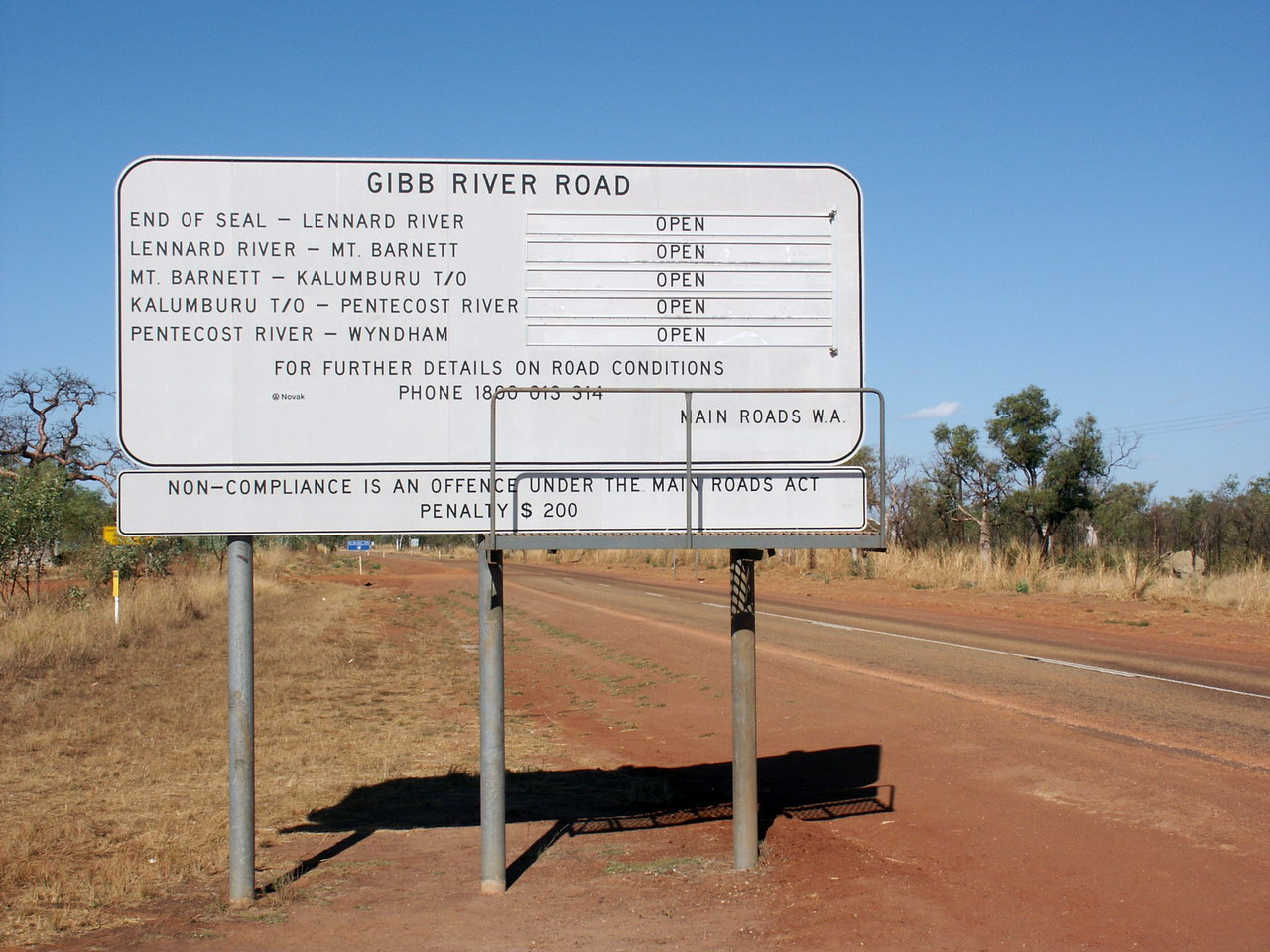
Sign

The Gibb River Road has scenic views of geological formations and natural scenery, Aboriginal and pastoral history, as well as rare and unique fauna and flora. Attractions along the road include Windjana Gorge National Park, Tunnel Creek National Park, Adcock Gorge, Manning Gorge, Galvans Gorge, Lennard Gorge, Bell Gorge, and Wunaamin Miliwundi Ranges. Accommodation is offered by several cattle stations in the area including Mount Hart Wilderness Lodge, Mount Barnett Station, Mount Elizabeth Station, Drysdale River Station, the El Questro Station, Ellenbrae and Charnley River Station.

== History ==
From 1948, an Air Beef Scheme operated between Glenroy Station and Wyndham. An abattoir, freezing works, and airstrip were built on the station and the meat airfreighted twice a day to the coast before being shipped to the southern cities. To develop the beef industry further, a Commonwealth Government grant to build a road was given in 1949 and the following year construction of a road to Derby commenced, one of a number of roads built as part of the so-called "Beef Roads Scheme". This southern section, which is sometimes referred to as the Derby-Gibb River Road, was completed in 1956 at a cost of £713,677 and was used for trucking live cattle.

The northern section of the road was under the control of the Shire of Wyndham–East Kimberley until 1996 when Main Roads Western Australia took over control and upgraded the full length of the highway.

== Native title ==
A joint native title claim, known as the Dambimangari claim and covering a large area of the Kimberley, was lodged in 1998 by the Wanjina-Wunggurr (Native Title) Aboriginal Corporation RNTBC on behalf of three peoples, the Worrorra of Dambimangari, the Wunambal Gaambera of Uunguu, and the Ngarinyin of Wilinggin. (Note: These three peoples make up a cultural bloc known as Wanjina Wunggur. Worrorra is the name of the people, Dambimangari their land; the land of the Wunambal Gaambera people is known as Uunguu; and that of the Ngarinyin is Wilinggin.) The Wilinggin portion of the claim, covering an area of more than 60,150 km^{2} (23,220 sq mi) along the Gibb River Road, was the first of the three to be determined for the Ngarinyin people, by litigation on 27 August 2004.

== See also ==
- Holland Track
- Gulf Developmental Road
