= Gingerah, Western Australia =

Gingerah
- Town
- Coordinates: 18.422°S 123.055°E
- Country: Australia
- State: Western Australia
- LGA(s): Shire of Broome

Government
  - State electorate(s): Kimberley
  - Federal division(s): Durack

Area
  - Total: 26,484.6 km^{2} (10,225.8 sq mi)

Population
  - Total(s): 0 (SAL 2021)
- Postcode: 6725

Gingerah is a locality in the Kimberley region of Western Australia. The locality is south-east of the townsite of Broome within the Shire of Broome local government area. Most of the locality is covered by the Karajarri Indigenous Protected Area.

Gingerah is the site of Gingerah Energy's proposed Gingerah Energy Hub, which will produce power using a combination of solar, geothermal and wind.
