= Djugun, Western Australia =

Djugun
- Suburb
- Interactive map of Djugun
- Coordinates: 17°56′28″S 122°13′52″E
- Country: Australia
- State: Western Australia
- City: Broome
- LGA: Shire of Broome

Government
  - State electorate: Kimberley
  - Federal division: Durack

Area
  - Total: 9.7 km^{2} (3.7 sq mi)

Population
  - Total: 3,291 (SAL 2021)
- Postcode: 6725
Suburbs around Djugun
	Bilingurr
Cable Beach	Djugun
	Broome

Djugun is a northern suburb of Broome, Western Australia within the local government area of the Shire of Broome. The name relates to the language of the local Djugun or Jukun Aboriginal people. Its population has increased from 2,067 at the 2006 census to 2,833 at the 2016 census.

== Facilities ==
Broome International Airport is located within the suburb, which also contains Roebuck Primary School and the Broome Recreation and Aquatic Centre.
