= Goldfields Highway =

Highway in Western Australia

Goldfields Highway Western Australia

General information
- Type: Highway
- Length: 797 km (495 mi)
- Route number(s): State Route 132; Alternate National Route 94 (Kalgoorlie to Coolgardie-Esperance Highway)

Major junctions
- Northwest end: Great Northern Highway (National Highway 95), Meekatharra
- Great Eastern Highway (Alternate National Route 94)
- Southeast end: Coolgardie-Esperance Highway (National Highway 95), Widgiemooltha

Location(s)
- Major settlements: Wiluna, Leonora, Menzies, Kalgoorlie, Kambalda

Highway system
- Highways in Australia; National Highway • Freeways in Australia; Highways in Western Australia

Goldfields Highway is a generally northwest–southeast highway in central Western Australia which links the Great Northern Highway at Meekatharra with Coolgardie-Esperance Highway south of Kalgoorlie. The highway is approximately 797 kilometres (495 mi) in length, and is designated as Alternate National Route 94 from Kalgoorlie to Coolgardie–Esperance Highway. The full highway has also been assigned State Route 132 since a review of state routes was conducted in 2024.

A large 180-kilometre (110 mi) section of the highway, from Meekatharra to Wiluna, is not a sealed road as of 2016. A project to upgrade Goldfields Highway by sealing this portion, over a three-year period, was scheduled to start in the 2017/18 financial year with $60 million of funding through Royalties for Regions. By July 2024, a total of 14.86 kilometres (9.23 mi) had been sealed.

== See also ==
- Highways in Australia
- List of highways in Western Australia
