= Shire of Broome =

Coordinates: 17°57′43″S 122°14′10″E

- Local government area
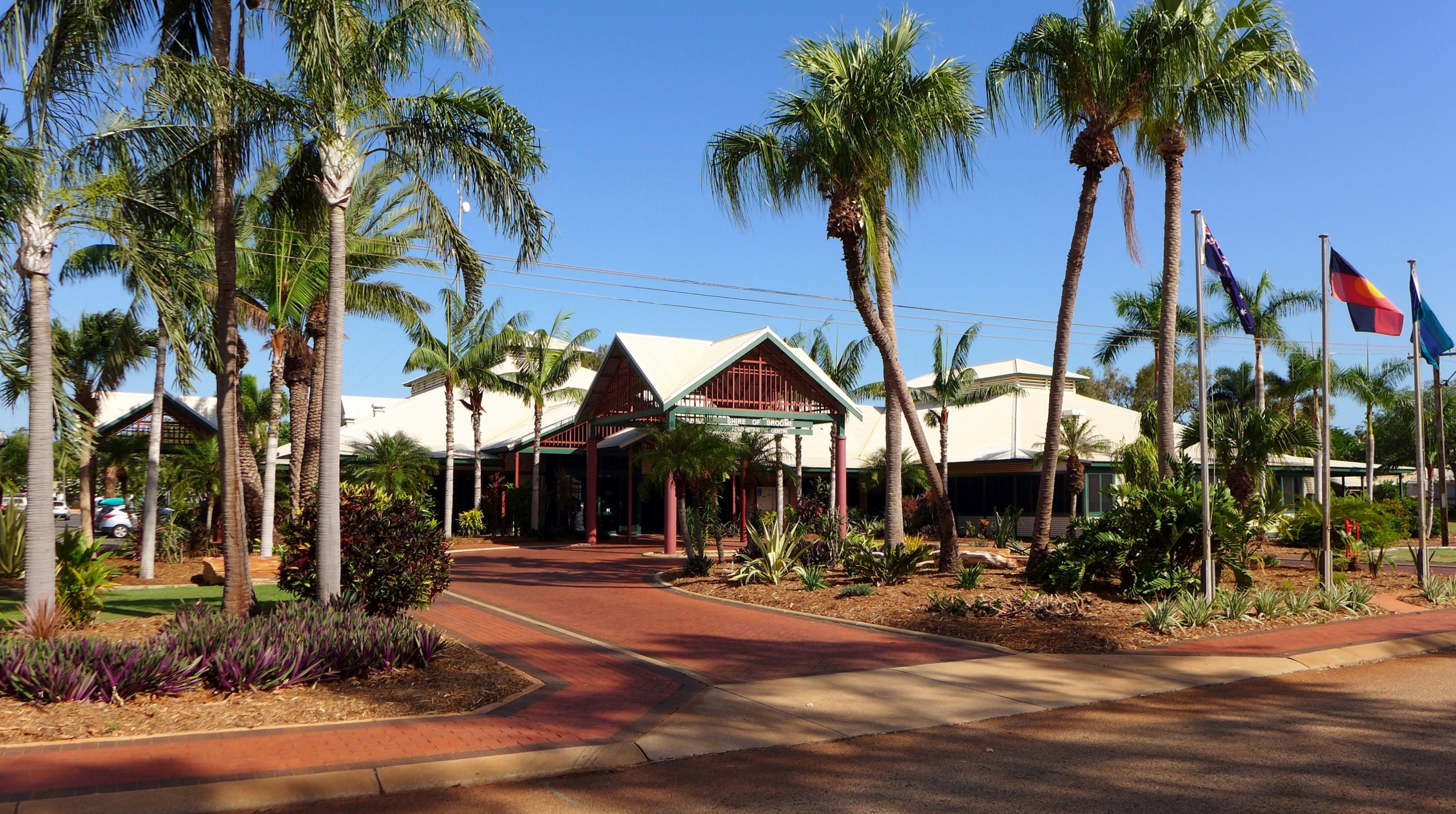
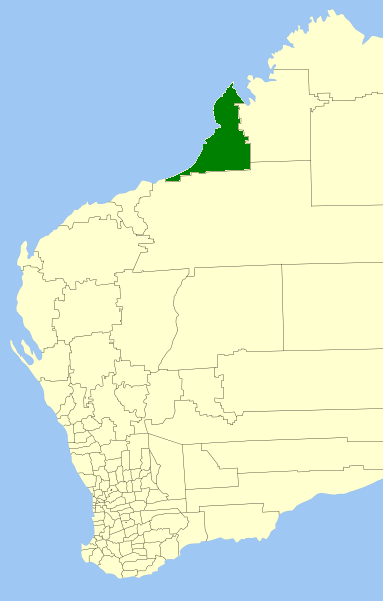
- The Shire Administration Centre, 2019 Location in Western Australia

- Interactive map of Shire of Broome
- Country: Australia
- State: Western Australia
- Region: Kimberley
- Established: 1918
- Council seat: Broome

Government
  - President: Chris Mitchell
  - State electorate: Kimberley
  - Federal division: Durack

Area
  - Total: 55,795.6 km^{2} (21,542.8 sq mi)

Population
  - Total: 16,959 (LGA 2021)
- Website: Shire of Broome
LGAs around Shire of Broome
| Cocos | Christmas Island | Derby-West Kimberley |
| Indian Ocean | Shire of Broome | Derby-West Kimberley |
| East Pilbara | East Pilbara | East Pilbara |

The Shire of Broome is one of the four local government areas in the Kimberley region of northern Western Australia, covering an area of 55,796 square kilometres (21,543 sq mi), most of which is sparsely populated. The Shire's estimated population as at the 2016 census was 16,222 most of whom reside in the town of Broome. Many Aboriginal communities are within the Shire, notably Beagle Bay and Bardi (One Arm Point).

The Shire of Broome includes the Rowley Shoals 260 km (162 mi) to the west.

== History ==
The Shire of Broome was first established as the second Broome Road District on 20 December 1918, when it was separated from the West Kimberley Road District. The area had been previously represented by an earlier Broome Road District (1901–1908) and the Municipality of Broome (1904–1918) but both had merged back into the West Kimberley district.

It was declared a shire with effect from 1 July 1961 following the passage of the Local Government Act 1960, which reformed all remaining road districts into shires.

== Elected council ==
The Shire is divided into two wards.

- Broome Ward (seven councillors)
- Dampier Ward (two councillors)

| Ward | Councillor | Position |
|---|---|---|
| Broome Ward | Harold Tracey | President |
| Broome Ward | Desiree Male | Deputy president |
| Broome Ward | Chris Mitchell JP | |
| Broome Ward | Bruce Rudeforth Jnr | |
| Broome Ward | Peter Taylor | |
| Broome Ward | Nik Wevers | |
| Broome Ward | Vacant | |
| Dampier Ward | Elsta Foy | |
| Dampier Ward | Philip Matsumoto | |

=== 2023 election results ===
2023 Western Australian local elections: Broome
| Party | Candidate | Votes | % | ±% |
|---|---|---|---|---|
| Independent | Melanie Virgo (elected) | 389 | 21.43 | |
| Labor | Ellen Smith (elected) | 288 | 15.87 | |
| Independent | Jan Lewis (elected) | 200 | 11.02 | |
| Independent | Elsta Foy | 162 | 8.93 | |
| Independent | Edward Fleming | 155 | 8.54 | |
| Independent | James Carpenter | 134 | 7.38 | |
| Independent | Gwen Knox | 131 | 7.22 | |
| Independent | Johani Mamid (elected) | 127 | 7.00 | |
| Independent | Brendan Renkin | 118 | 6.50 | |
| Independent | Mala Haji-Ali | 81 | 4.46 | |
| Independent | Jerome Herveux | 30 | 1.65 | |
| Total formal votes | | 1,815 | 98.64 | |
| Informal votes | | 25 | 1.36 | |
| Turnout | | 1,840 | 20.48 | |

== Towns and localities ==
The towns and localities of the Shire of Broome with population and size figures based on the most recent Australian census:

| Locality | Population | Area | Map |
|---|---|---|---|
| Bilingurr | 1,540 (SAL 2021) | 13.1 km^{2} (5.1 sq mi) | |
| Broome | 3,797 (SAL 2021) | 7.4 km^{2} (2.9 sq mi) | |
| Cable Beach | 5,730 (SAL 2021) | 9.4 km^{2} (3.6 sq mi) | |
| Dampier Peninsula | 1,051 (SAL 2021) | 4,898.4 km^{2} (1,891.3 sq mi) | |
| Djugun | 3,291 (SAL 2021) | 9.7 km^{2} (3.7 sq mi) | |
| Eighty Mile Beach | 120 (SAL 2021) | 9,001.3 km^{2} (3,475.4 sq mi) | |
| Gingerah | 0 (SAL 2021) | 26,484.6 km^{2} (10,225.8 sq mi) | |
| Lagrange | 634 (SAL 2021) | 3,228.1 km^{2} (1,246.4 sq mi) | |
| Minyirr | 76 (SAL 2021) | 13.1 km^{2} (5.1 sq mi) | |
| Roebuck * | 606 (SAL 2021) | 5,582.4 km^{2} (2,155.4 sq mi) | |
| Waterbank * | 110 (SAL 2021) | 6,634 km^{2} (2,561 sq mi) | |

- (* indicates locality is only partially located within this shire)

== Indigenous communities ==
Indigenous communities in the Shire of Broome:

- Ardyaloon (One Arm Point/Bardi)
- Beagle Bay
- Bidyadanga
- Djarindjin (Lombadina)

== Heritage-listed places ==
As of 2023, 144 places are heritage-listed in the Shire of Broome,^{[N1]} of which 51 are on the State Register of Heritage Places, among them the Sun Picture Gardens, Broome Cable House and Anglican Church of the Annunciation.^{[N2]}

== Notes ==
- ^[N1]A search for Broome LGA returns 356 hits, of which 216 are for the Broomehill-Tambellup LGA, 144 for Broome LGA and one for Wyndham-East Kimberley LGA
- ^[N2]A search for Broome LGA returns 56 hits, of which five are for the Broomehill-Tambellup LGA and 51 for Broome LGA
