= Remote Western Australia =

Remote Western Australia is that part of Western Australia that is either isolated or well away from the main concentrations of population and services found in the south west of the state.

The usage of the phrase remote Western Australia is considered synonymous with the term outback Western Australia.

Designated "remote areas" are found in the regions of the north and north east of the state.

== Communities ==
Considerable efforts have been made to provide services and facilities in isolated and remote communities in Western Australia.

== Pastoral industry ==
Almost all of the existing pastoral leases of Western Australia exist within the region considered as the "remote" or "outback".

== Telecommunications ==
There are specific designations as to locations and areas in remote Western Australia for services.

== Department of Transport definition ==
The Department of Transport has a very clear definition:

All that portion of Western Australia not included in the South West Land Division nor that area south of the 30th degree parallel south latitude and west of the 123rd meridian. This also includes the area further than 80km radius from Esperance bounded on the northern side by a line drawn in a north-east direction from Esperance on the eastern side by the 123 meridian and on the southern side by the coast.

== Health facilities ==
Frequently, communities in the remote area are referred to as being in the category of "remote communities", and in the University of Western Australia there is a centre specifically related to the practice of remote and rural medicine.

== See also ==
- Aboriginal communities in Western Australia
- List of pastoral leases in Western Australia
- Outback (Australia)
- Regions of Western Australia
