= Roebuck, Western Australia =

Roebuck
- Suburb
- Coordinates: 17.9866°S 122.61492°E
- Country: Australia
- State: Western Australia
- LGA: Shire of Broome; Shire of Derby–West Kimberley

Government
  - State electorate: Kimberley
  - Federal division: Durack

Area
  - Total: 5,582.4 km^{2} (2,155.4 sq mi)

Population
  - Total: 606 (SAL 2021)
- Postcode: 6725

Roebuck is a locality in the Kimberley region of Western Australia. It contains Roebuck Plains Station.
