= Port Hedland Saltworks Important Bird Area =

Bird area on coast of Western Australia

Coordinates: 20°14′55″S 118°55′56″E

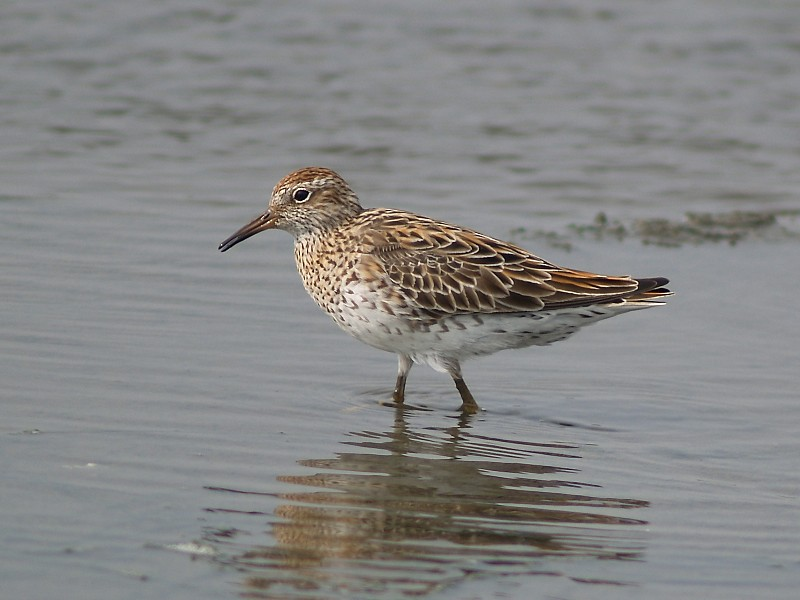
The site is an important area for sharp-tailed sandpipers

The Port Hedland Saltworks Important Bird Area is a 103 km^{2} tract of originally intertidal land, now containing a saltern, lying about 20 km east of the port of Port Hedland on the coast of the Pilbara region of north-west Western Australia. The salt processing facility is operated by Dampier Salt Ltd, part of the Rio Tinto Group.

== Description ==
The Important Bird Area (IBA) comprises a system of evaporation ponds, the intake zone where seawater enters, and the adjacent intertidal mudflats. The system includes levee banks and scattered mangroves. During low tides, waterbirds forage on the mudflats and along nearby creeks. During high tides, they move to the saltworks to continue feeding or to roost.

=== Port Hedland Saltworks ===
The Port Hedland Saltworks was purchased by Dampier Salt in 2001 and covers an operational area of about 91 km^{2} of which the nine evaporation ponds take up 78 km^{2}. It has an annual production capacity of 3.2 Mt.

=== Birds ===
The site has been identified by BirdLife International as an IBA because it regularly supports over 1% of the world populations of red-necked stints and sharp-tailed sandpipers, as well as a population of the range-restricted dusky gerygone. It previously supported much greater numbers of several more species of waterbirds, especially waders, with counts of up to 66,800 birds present; however, since the expansion of the saltworks in the 1990s numbers have dropped to 5000–10,000. Species that have strongly declined since the 1980s are broad-billed sandpipers, Asian dowitchers, curlew sandpipers, red-necked avocets, banded stilts, Oriental plovers, Oriental pratincoles and white-winged black terns. Other species present include Australian bustards, bush stone-curlews, western bowerbirds, painted finches and canary white-eyes.

== See also ==
- Dampier Saltworks Important Bird Area
