= List of shipwrecks in September 1843 =

The list of shipwrecks in September 1843 includes ships sunk, foundered, wrecked, grounded or otherwise lost during September 1843.

== 1 September ==
List of shipwrecks: 1 September 1843
Ship	State	Description
Duke of Wellington	United Kingdom	The barque was wrecked on "Starkjaar", in the Gulf of Finland. She was on a voyage from Dundee, Forfarshire to Narva, Russia.
Formosa	Prussia	The barque was wrecked on the Mare's Rock, off Tiree, Inner Hebrides with the loss of two of her eleven crew. She was on a voyage from Liverpool, Lancashire, United Kingdom to Königsberg.
Oxford	United Kingdom	The ship was wrecked off Rodrigues, Mauritius. All on board were rescued by John Renwick (United Kingdom). Oxford was on a voyage from Calcutta, India to London.
Queen	United Kingdom	The paddle steamer ran aground and sank on the north coast of Skokholm, Pembrokeshire with the loss of one life. Survivors were rescued by the coaster Hope (United Kingdom). Queen was on a voyage from Bristol, Gloucestershire to Dublin.
Salus	United Kingdom	The ship sprang a leak and foundered in the Atlantic Ocean. Her crew were rescued by Guido (France). Salus was on a voyage from Sunderland, County Durham to a port in New Brunswick, British North America.

== 2 September ==
List of shipwrecks: 2 September 1843
Ship	State	Description
Jim	United Kingdom	The ship was driven ashore at Lancaster, Lancashire.
Neptune	United Kingdom	The ship was driven ashore near Höganäs, Öland, Sweden. She was on a voyage from St. David's, Pembrokeshire to Saint Petersburg, Russia.
Themis	France	The ship ran aground on Saltholm, Denmark. She was on a voyage from Cette, Hérault to a Baltic port. She was refloated and resumed her voyage.

== 3 September ==
List of shipwrecks: 3 September 1843
Ship	State	Description
Adventure	United Kingdom	The ship was abandoned in the Atlantic Ocean. Her crew were rescued by Empress (United Kingdom). Adventure was on a voyage from London to Quebec City, Province of Canada, British North America.
Empress	United States	The ship departed from Málaga, Spain for New York. No further trace, presumed foundered with the loss of all hands.
Levant Star	United Kingdom	The ship ran aground on the Spaniard Sand, in the North Sea off the coast of Kent. She was on a voyage from a Welsh port to London. She was refloated and resumed her voyage.

== 4 September ==
List of shipwrecks: 4 September 1843
Ship	State	Description
Astrea	United Kingdom	The ship was driven ashore and wrecked at Thisted, Denmark. She was on a voyage from Cádiz, Spain to Saint Petersburg, Russia.
Atlas	United Kingdom	The ship foundered in the Baltic Sea off Gotland, Sweden. She was on a voyage from Christianstad, Sweden to Grimsby, Lincolnshire.
Atten Sodskende	Sweden	The ship was driven ashore and wrecked at "Grimmershom". Her crew were rescued. She was on a voyage from Gotland to the Firth of Forth. She was refloated on 8 September and taken into Cuxhaven.
Borussia	Prussia	The ship was driven ashore on Rügen. She was on a voyage from Stettin to an English port.
Ino	United Kingdom	The ship was driven ashore at Zhoushan, China.
Margaretha	Denmark	The ship was driven ashore at "Lyenas". She was on a voyage from Newcastle upon Tyne, Northumberland, United Kingdom to Nykøbing. She was later refloated and towed into "Holbeck".
Moire	United Kingdom	The ship was driven ashore on Tea Island, Chusan.
Victoria	United Kingdom	The ship was wrecked near Helsingør, Denmark. Her crew were rescued. She was on a voyage from Dundee, Forfarshire to Memel, Prussia.
Welint	(Russian Empire) Grand Duchy of Finland	The ship was wrecked off Halmstad, Sweden. Her crew were rescued. She was on a voyage from Hull, Yorkshire, United Kingdom to Oulu.
William	United Kingdom	The ship was wrecked on the Anholt Reefs, off the coast of Denmark. Her crew were rescued. She was on a voyage from Hull to Saint Petersburg, Russia.

== 5 September ==
List of shipwrecks: 5 September 1843
Ship	State	Description
Christine Maria	Flag unknown	The ship ran aground off "Haunsee" and was wrecked.
Ferret	United Kingdom	The ship ran aground at Saint Petersburg, Russia. She was later refloated.
Glory	United Kingdom	The ship was wrecked near Thisted, Denmark. Her crew were rescued. She was on a voyage from Hartlepool, County Durham to Saint Petersburg.
Good Intent	United Kingdom	The sloop capsized and sank in the North Sea off the Bull Lightship ( Trinity House) with the loss of three of the five people on board. Survivors were rescued by a Grimsby pilot cutter.
Haabet	Norway	The ship was driven ashore near "Nusevig", Russia. Her crew were rescued.
Nuestra Señora de la Piedad	Spain	The ship ran aground on the Long Sand, in the North Sea off the coast of Essex, United Kingdom. She was on a voyage from Bergen, Norway to Bilbao. She was refloated and taken into Margate, Kent, United Kingdom in a sinking condition.
Vesta	Prussia	The ship was driven ashore on Bornholm, Denmark. Her crew were rescued. She was on a voyage from Pillau to Leith, Lothian, United Kingdom.

== 6 September ==
List of shipwrecks: 6 September 1843
Ship	State	Description
Johanna	Portugal	The ship was driven ashore and wrecked at Manasquan, New Jersey, United States. She was on a voyage from Lisbon to New York, United States.
Socrates	(United Kingdom of Great Britain and Ireland) Van Diemen's Land	The barque was driven ashore and wrecked at Port Fairy. Her crew survived.

== 7 September ==
List of shipwrecks: 7 September 1843
Ship	State	Description
Aire	United Kingdom	The ship struck a sunken rock off "Bridsand", Norway. She was abandoned on 9 September and set afire. Her crew were rescued by Hannah Moore (United Kingdom). Aire was on a voyage from Arkhangelsk, Russia to London.
Caledonia	United Kingdom	The brig was wrecked at Sharpnose Point, Cornwall with the loss of all but one of her crew. She was on a voyage from Falmouth, Cornwall to Gloucester.
Mary Jane	United Kingdom	The brig sprang a leak and capsized in the Seine.

== 8 September ==
List of shipwrecks: 8 September 1843
Ship	State	Description
Ariadne	Danzig	The ship ran aground off Hellesund, Norway. She was on a voyage from Danzig to London, United Kingdom.

== 9 September ==
List of shipwrecks: 9 September 1843
Ship	State	Description
Cordelia	United Kingdom	The schooner was driven ashore 5 nautical miles (9.3 km) south of Bridlington, Yorkshire. She was on a voyage from Brixham, Devon to Newcastle upon Tyne, Northumberland. She was refloated on 11 September and taken into Bridlington.
Dorothea Bertha	Flag unknown	The ship ran aground on the Holme Sand, in the North Sea. She was on a voyage from London to South Shields, County Durham. She was refloated and anchored off Great Yarmouth, Norfolk.
Lady Huntley	United Kingdom	The ship was driven ashore on Cook's Island, Nova Scotia, British North America. She was on a voyage from Liverpool, Lancashire to Prince Edward Island, British North America.
Lapwing	United Kingdom	The ship was driven ashore and wrecked 2 nautical miles (3.7 km) north of Flamborough Head, Yorkshire. Her crew were rescued. She was on a voyage from Sunderland, County Durham to London.
Malta	United Kingdom	The ship was driven ashore at Bridlington. She was refloated with assistance from HMS Blazer and towed into North Shields, County Durham.
Victory	United Kingdom	The ship was wrecked at the Kullen Lighthouse, Sweden. She was on a voyage from Dundee, Forfarshire to Memel, Prussia.

== 10 September ==
List of shipwrecks: 10 September 1843
Ship	State	Description
Ann Kenny	United Kingdom	The ship was driven ashore in the Magdalen Islands, Nova Scotia, British North America. She was on a voyage from London to Prince Edward Island, British North America. She was refloated and towed in to Canso, Nova Scotia.
Fairfield	United Kingdom	The barque was wrecked on the Keith Reef, in the Mediterranean Sea between Sicily and the cost of Africa. Her fourteen crew were rescued by the brig Christina ( Grand Duchy of Mecklenburg-Schwerin). Fairfield was on a voyage from Ancona, Papal States to Pembroke Dockyard.
Karen Andrea	Denmark	The ship ran aground on the Wresen Ground. She was on a voyage from Newcastle upon Tyne, Northumberland, United Kingdom to Nakskov. She was refloated and put in to Nyborg.
Regatta	United Kingdom	The brig was wrecked at Keiss, Caithness. She was on a voyage from Kronstadt, Russia to Belfast, County Antrim. She was refloated in late October and taken into Pulteneytown, Caithness for repairs.

== 11 September ==
List of shipwrecks: 11 September 1843
Ship	State	Description
Astrea	United Kingdom	The ship was driven ashore at Quillebeuf-sur-Seine, Eure, France. She was refloated the next day.
Jane	(United Kingdom of Great Britain and Ireland) Jersey	The ship was driven ashore at Arichat, Nova Scotia, British North America. She was refloated and taken into Arichat.
Page	United Kingdom	The schooner was driven ashore and wrecked at Quillebeuf-sur-Seine.
Paragon	United Kingdom	The ship was driven ashore at Quillebeur-sur-Seine. She was refloated the next day.

== 12 September ==
List of shipwrecks: 12 September 1843
Ship	State	Description
Ann Marvel	United Kingdom	The ship was abandoned in the Atlantic Ocean. Her crew were rescued. She was on a voyage from Hull, Yorkshire to Saint John, New Brunswick, British North America.
Caroline's Haab	Danzig	The ship foundered in the Baltic Sea off Bornholm, Denmark. Her crew were rescued.
Daphne	United Kingdom	The brig sprang a leak and foundered in the North Sea 10 nautical miles (19 km) off Flamborough Head, Yorkshire. Her crew were rescued.

== 13 September ==
List of shipwrecks: 13 September 1843
Ship	State	Description
Aimable Eugene	France	The ship was driven ashore at Quillebeuf-sur-Seine, Eure.
Bee	United Kingdom	The ship was driven ashore at Quillebeuf-sur-Seine.
Duncannon	United Kingdom	The steamship foundered in the North Sea off Spurn Point, Yorkshire. All on board were rescued. She was refloated on 15 September and beached on Spurn Point.
Lehore	France	The ship was driven ashore at Quillebeuf-sur-Seine.
St. Jean	France	The ship was driven ashore at Quillebeuf-sur-Seine.

== 14 September ==
List of shipwrecks: 14 September 1843
Ship	State	Description
Amelia	(United Kingdom of Great Britain and Ireland) Tobago	The cutter was driven ashore at Scarborough. She was refloated.
Caroline	(United Kingdom of Great Britain and Ireland) Tobago	The sloop was driven ashore and wrecked in Tyrrell's Bay.
Countess of Dunmore	United Kingdom	The ship was driven ashore at Therapia, Ottoman Empire. She was on a voyage from Taganrog, Russia to Constantinople, Ottoman Empire. She was refloated and taken into Constantinople.

== 15 September ==
List of shipwrecks: 15 September 1843
Ship	State	Description
North America	United Kingdom	The ship ran aground off Governor's Island, Massachusetts, United States. She was on a voyage from Halifax, Nova Scotia, British North America to Boston, Massachusetts. She was refloated the next day and taken into Boston.
William	United Kingdom	The ship was wrecked on the Anholt Reef, off the coast of Denmark.

== 16 September ==
List of shipwrecks: 16 September 1843
Ship	State	Description
Chester	United Kingdom	The ship ran aground on the Romer Shoals, off Sandy Hook, New Jersey, United States. She was on a voyage from Liverpool, Lancashire to New York, United States. Chester was refloated on 27 September and taken into New York.
Loxandra	Greece	The ship was wrecked near Marmara Ereğlisi, Ottoman Empire.
Ranger	United Kingdom	The whaler was holed by ice and sank off the coast of Greenland. Her crew were rescued.

== 17 September ==
List of shipwrecks: 17 September 1843
Ship	State	Description
Aurora	Stettin	The ship struck rocks at Buoy Head, Aberdeenshire, United Kingdom. She was on a voyage from Wick, Caithness to Stettin. She put into Fraserburgh, Aberdeenshire.
Charlotte	United Kingdom	The smack was abandoned in the Irish Sea off Point Lynas, Anglesey. Her crew were rescued by the steamship Caledonia (United Kingdom).

== 18 September ==
List of shipwrecks: 18 September 1843
Ship	State	Description
Borneo	United Kingdom	The ship was wrecked at Cranberry Head, New Brunswick, British North America. Her crew were rescued. She was on a voyage from Liverpool, Lancashire to St. John's, Newfoundland, British North America.
Caledonian	United States	The ship was wrecked at Port-Vendres, Pyrénées-Orientales, France. Her crew were rescued. She was on a voyage from New Orleans, Louisiana to Cette, Hérault, France.
Johanna	Sweden	The ship sprang a leak and foundered in the Baltic Sea. Her crew were rescued.
Sally	(United Kingdom of Great Britain and Ireland) New South Wales	The schooner was wrecked whilst of a voyage from the Richmond River to Sydney with the loss of five of the six people on board.
Sylvanus	United Kingdom	The ship was wrecked on Scatterie Island, Nova Scotia, British North America. Her crew were rescued. She was on a voyage from Truro, Cornwall to Miramichi, New Brunswick, British North America.

== 19 September ==
List of shipwrecks: 19 September 1843
Ship	State	Description
Beaver	United Kingdom	The ship foundered in the North Sea off Dimlington, Yorkshire. Her crew were rescued.
Clipper	United States	The steamboat suffered a boiler explosion and sank in the Mississippi River at Bayou Sara, Louisiana with the loss of 31 of her 40 crew. She was on a voyage from Bayou Sara to Tunica, Louisiana.
Robert Morrow	United Kingdom	The ship foundered in the Mediterranean Sea off Algiers, Algeria. Her crew were rescued by Somerset (United Kingdom). Robert Morrow was on a voyage from Bristol, Gloucestershire to Constantinople, Ottoman Empire.

== 20 September ==
List of shipwrecks: 20 September 1843
Ship	State	Description
Angeline	United Kingdom	The ship was driven onto rocks at Duncansby Head, Caithness. She was on a voyage from Saint Petersburg, Russia to Liverpool, Lancashire. She was refloated and put into Stromness, Orkney Islands.
Ann	United Kingdom	The ship ran aground off Redcar, Yorkshire. She was on a voyage from Hartlepool, County Durham to London. She was refloated and made for Whitby, Yorkshire.
Delhi	United Kingdom	The barque was driven ashore at the Cape of Good Hope. Her crew were rescued.
Elizabeth Rowell	United Kingdom	The ship was driven ashore at the Cape of Good Hope. Her crew were rescued.
Laura	United Kingdom	The brig was driven ashore at the Cape of Good Hope with the loss of most of her crew.
Sea Gull	United Kingdom	The brig was driven ashore at the Cape of Good Hope with the loss of most of her crew.
Williams	United Kingdom	The ship ran aground on the north point of Hogland, Russian Empire. She was on a voyage from Inverkeithing, Fife to Saint Petersburg, Russia. She was refloated on 22 September and taken into Saint Petersburg.

== 21 September ==
List of shipwrecks: October 1843
Ship	State	Description
Anne	United Kingdom	The smack sprang a leak and foundered off Bardsey Island, Pembrokeshire.
Mary	United Kingdom	The ship was driven ashore at Stornoway, Isle of Lewis. She was on a voyage from Riga, Russia to Belfast, County Antrim. Mary was refloated on 24 September and taken into Stornoway for repairs.
Pieterelena	Netherlands	The ship was sighted in the Øresund whilst on a voyage from Danzig to Amsterdam, North Holland. No further trace, presumed foundered with the loss of all hands.

== 22 September ==
List of shipwrecks: 22 September 1843
Ship	State	Description
Alida	Bremen	The ship was driven ashore and wrecked on Ameland, Friesland, Netherlands with the loss of her captain. She was on a voyage from Hull, Yorkshire, United Kingdom to Bremen.
Duke of Cambridge	United Kingdom	The ship was driven ashore between Hjørring and Thisted, Denmark. Her crew were rescued. She was on a voyage from Liverpool, Lancashire to Narva, Russia. Her crew were rescued.
Hanna	United Kingdom	The ship was driven ashore and sank on Ryvingen Island, Norway. She was on a voyage from an English port to Mandal, Norway.
Joanna	(United Kingdom of Great Britain and Ireland) New South Wales	The schooner was wrecked between Cape Otway and Moonlight Head with the loss of a crew member. She was on a voyage from Launceston, Van Diemen's Land to Sydney.
Lady Stafford	(United Kingdom of Great Britain and Ireland) British North America	The ship was driven ashore at Pinchard Island, Newfoundland.

== 23 September ==
List of shipwrecks: 23 September 1843
Ship	State	Description
Africaine	United Kingdom	The barque was wrecked at Cape St. Lawrence, British North America with the loss of two of her crew. She was on a voyage from South Shields, County Durham to Quebec City, Province of Canada, British North America.
Echo	(United Kingdom of Great Britain and Ireland) Jersey	The ship was driven onto rocks at St. Helier and damaged. She was on a voyage from Plymouth, Devon to St. Helia. She was refloated and taken into port.
Eleanore	Danzig	The ship was driven ashore near Glettkau. She was on a voyage from Danzig to London, United Kingdom. She was refloated on 30 September and taken into Danzig.
Emma	(United Kingdom of Great Britain and Ireland) New South Wales	The ship was driven ashore at Adelaide, South Australia. She was on a voyage from Sydney to Adelaide.

== 25 September ==
List of shipwrecks: 25 September 1843
Ship	State	Description
Andrew Marvel	United Kingdom	The ship foundered in the Atlantic Ocean. Her crew were rescued by Lotus (United Kingdom. She was on a voyage from Hull, Yorkshire to Saint John, New Brunswick, British North America.
Alert	United Kingdom	The schooner was destroyed by fire in the English Channel off Dover, Kent. Her crew were rescued. She was on a voyage from London to Vila Nova or vice versa.
Heber	United Kingdom	The brig was wrecked on Hogland, Russia. Her crew were rescued. She was on a voyage from Newcastle upon Tyne, Northumberland to Saint Petersburg, Russia.
Lord Yarborough	United Kingdom	The steamship ran aground on the Goose-wing Rock, off the Isle of Wight. All 70 passengers were taken off by a local fishing boat.
Vestal	United Kingdom	The ship foundered 40 nautical miles (74 km) off Cephalonia, United States of the Ionian Islands. Her crew were rescued. She was on a voyage from England to Crete.

== 26 September ==
List of shipwrecks: 26 September 1843
Ship	State	Description
Coriolanus	United Kingdom	The ship foundered. Her crew were rescued.
Euphemia	United Kingdom	The brig was destroyed by fire on the Herd Sand, in the North Sea off the coast of County Durham. Her crew were rescued. She was on a voyage from Sunderland to South Shields.
Trinculo	United Kingdom	The ship departed from Nassau, Bahamas for Liverpool, Lancashire. No further trace, presumed foundered with the loss of all hands.
Vesta	Sweden	The ship was driven ashore on Texel, North Holland, Netherlands.

== 27 September ==
List of shipwrecks: 27 September 1843
Ship	State	Description
Don	United Kingdom	The ship was driven ashore at Fraserburgh, Aberdeenshire. Her crew were rescued.
Ettina	United Kingdom	The ship foundered in the North Sea off Ameland, Friesland, Netherlands. Her crew were rescued. She was on a voyage from a Scottish port to Stade, Kingdom of Hanover.
Henry	United Kingdom	The smack was driven ashore on Hilbre Island, Flintshire. Her crew were rescued. She was on a voyage from Liverpool, Lancashire to Amlwch, Anglesey.
Wanstead	United Kingdom	The ship was abandoned in the Atlantic Ocean at 46°00′N 55°30′E. Apollo, of Dundee (United Kingdom), rescued the master and crew and brought them into Quebec. (United Kingdom).

== 28 September ==
List of shipwrecks: 28 September 1843
Ship	State	Description
Anna Dorothea	France	The ship ran aground and sank at Honfleur, Calvados. She was refloated on 30 September and taken into Honfleur.
Don	United Kingdom	The ship was driven ashore and wrecked north of Rattray Head, Aberdeenshire. Her crew were rescued. She was on a voyage from Wick, Caithness to Leith, Lothian.
Moira	United Kingdom	The ship departed from Chusan, China for Hong Kong. No further trace, presumed foundered with the loss of all hands.
Paul Emille	France	The ship collided with Cecelia (United Kingdom) and sank in the Atlantic Ocean 200 nautical miles (370 km) off Cape Finisterre, Spain with the loss of four of her crew. Survivors were rescued by Cecelia. Paul Emille was on a voyage from St. Jago de Cuba, Cuba to Bordeaux, Gironde.
Tug	United Kingdom	The ship ran aground on the Goodwin Sands, Kent. She was on a voyage from Inverkeithing, Fife to Rouen, Seine-Inférieure, France. Tug was refloated and taken into The Downs.

== 29 September ==
List of shipwrecks: 29 September 1843
Ship	State	Description
Radford	United Kingdom	The ship was discovered derelict at sea and taken into Terschelling, Friesland, Netherlands.
Rapid	United Kingdom	The ship sprang a leak and sank in the North Sea. Her crew were rescued by Sympathy (United Kingdom). Rapid was on a voyage from Newcastle upon Tyne, Northumberland to Saint Petersburg, Russia.
Sarah Marks	(United Kingdom of Great Britain and Ireland) British North America	The ship was wrecked on Cape Sable Island, Nova Scotia. Her crew were rescued. She was on a voyage from St. Stephen, New Brunswick to the West Indies.

== 30 September ==
List of shipwrecks: 30 September 1843
Ship	State	Description
Albion	United Kingdom	The schooner sprang a leak and foundered in the North Sea off St. Abbs Head, Berwickshire. Her crew were rescued.
Don Juan	United States	The full-rigged ship was wrecked on the east coast of Grand Bahama, Bahamas in a hurricane. All on board were rescued. She was on a voyage from New Orleans, Louisiana to New York.
Jupiter	United Kingdom	The ship was driven ashore and sank in St. Brides Bay.
United States	United States	The full-rigged ship was wrecked on Key Gotha in a hurricane. All on board were rescued. She was on a voyage from New Orleans to Philadelphia, Pennsylvania.
Uruguay	Spain	The brig was wrecked on a reef off Watling's Island, Bahamas in a hurricane. All on board were rescued. She was on a voyage from St. Jago de Cuba, Cuba to Barcelona and Cádiz.

== Unknown date ==
List of shipwrecks: Unknown date in September 1843
Ship	State	Description
Alert	United Kingdom	The ship was driven ashore at Country Harbour, Nova Scotia, British North America. She was on a voyage from Halifax, Nova Scotia to Portsmouth, Hampshire. She was refloated and taken into Country Harbour.
Arannah	United Kingdom	The schooner was driven ashore in Chaleur Bay with the loss of seven lives before 13 September.
Bride	United Kingdom	The ship was driven ashore in the Gut of Canso. She was refloated.
Cassadra	Stettin	The schooner foundered in the North Sea between 3 and 7 September. Her crew were rescued by a Norwegian vessel. She was on a voyage from Sunderland, County Durham, United Kingdom to Stettin.
Chapman	United Kingdom	The ship was driven ashore at St. Thomas, Newfoundland, British North America before 5 September. She was on a voyage from Halifax to Portsmouth. Chapman was refloated and resumed her voyage.
Don Cossack	United Kingdom	The ship was driven ashore and wrecked in Murkle Bay.
Gazelle	United Kingdom	The ship foundered in the North Sea in late September.
Henrietta	United States	The schooner was lost in the Bay of St. Lawrence. Crew saved.
Jane Scott	(United Kingdom of Great Britain and Ireland) New South Wales	The cutter was wrecked in the Macleay River. All on board were rescued.
Jubilee	United Kingdom	The brig was abandoned in the Atlantic Ocean before 9 September. Her crew were rescued by Emma Zoller (United Kingdom).
June	(United Kingdom of Great Britain and Ireland) Jersey	The ship was driven ashore at Alicante, Spain. She was refloated on 12 September.
Levant Packet	United Kingdom	The ship was wrecked in the Yangtze.
Margaret	United Kingdom	The ship was abandoned whilst on a voyage from Bristol, Gloucestershire to Quebec City, Province of Canada, British North America. Her crew were rescued.
Mary Ann	(United Kingdom of Great Britain and Ireland) New South Wales	The schooner was driven ashore and wrecked north of Seal Rock Bay. Her crew were rescued. She was on a voyage from Sydney to the Manning River.
Princess Victoria	(United Kingdom of Great Britain and Ireland) British North America	The schooner capsized in the Atlantic Ocean 50 nautical miles (93 km) west of Cape Sable Island, Nova Scotia with the loss of four of her five crew. The survivor was rescued after five days on the wreck by the schooner Margaret (United Kingdom).
Queen	(United Kingdom of Great Britain and Ireland) New South Wales	The cutter was driven ashore north of Seal Rock Bay. Her crew were rescued. She was on a voyage from Sydney to the Manning River.
Recovery	United Kingdom	The ship was driven ashore near "Tackeroth", Russia. She had been refloated and taken into Bolderāja by 13 September.
Retrieve	United Kingdom	The schooner was driven ashore at "Mixmate". She was on a voyage from Boston, Massachusetts, United States to Parrsboro, Nova Scotia. She was refloated on 23 September and put in to Parrsboro.
Wild Irish Girl	United Kingdom	The ship ran aground on the Red Island Reef. She was refloated on 25 September and taken into Quebec City, Province of Canada, British North America.
