= Wedgefield, Western Australia =

Wedgefield
- Town
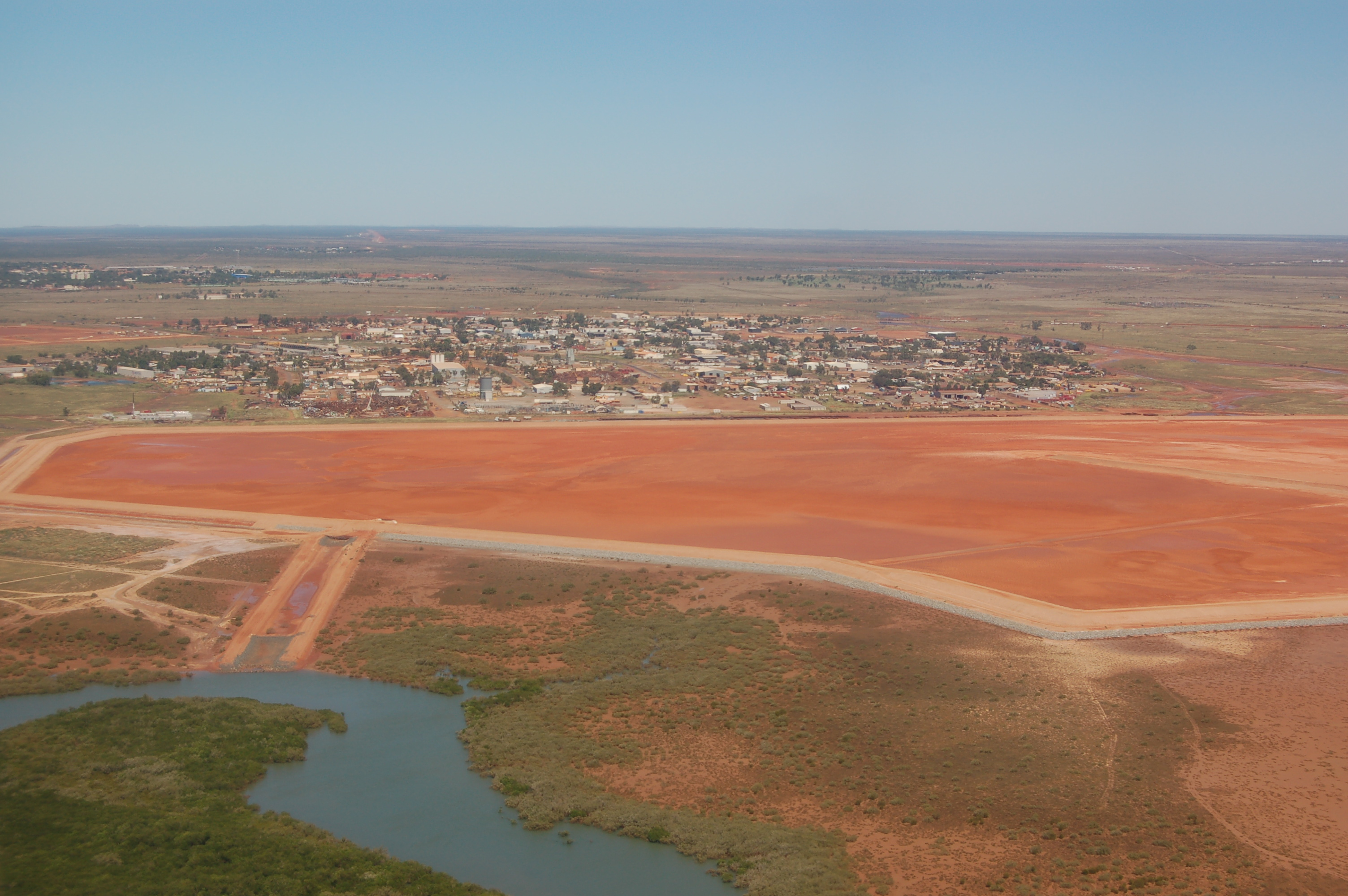
- Aerial view of Wedgefield from the north, April 2012

- Interactive map of Wedgefield
- Coordinates: 20°22′25″S 118°35′34″E
- Country: Australia
- State: Western Australia
- LGA: Town of Port Hedland
- Location: 1,634 km (1,015 mi) from Perth; 16 km (9.9 mi) from Port Hedland
- Established: 1960s

Government
  - State electorate: Pilbara
  - Federal division: Durack

Area
  - Total: 20.1 km^{2} (7.8 sq mi)
- Elevation: 7 m (23 ft)

Population
  - Total: 127 (SAL 2021)
- Postcode: 6721
- Mean max temp: 33.2 °C (91.8 °F)
- Mean min temp: 19.3 °C (66.7 °F)
- Annual rainfall: 313.5 mm (12.34 in)

Wedgefield is an industrial area in Western Australia's Pilbara region, off Great Northern Highway 2 km north of South Hedland, and was gazetted in 1973. It contains a variety of light and service industry premises, and also supports a small residential population. It was named for government surveyor Charles Wedge who, in June 1866, investigated Port Hedland as an alternative to Port Walcott to service the De Grey River pastoral industry. At the 2006 census, Wedgefield had a population of 538.
