= Dampier Saltworks Important Bird Area =

Important Bird Area in Western Australia

Coordinates: 20°43′08″S 116°43′38″E

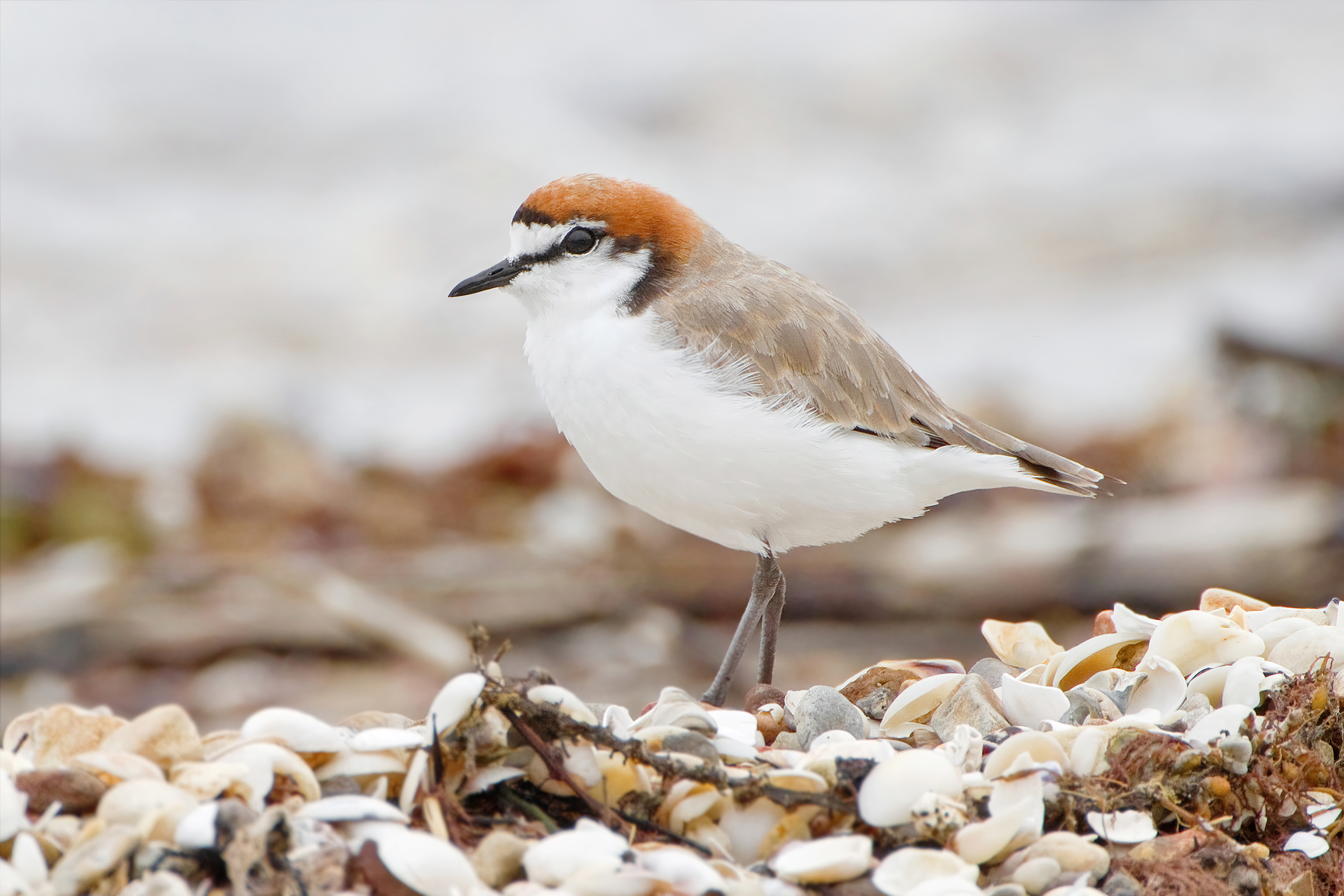
The saltworks is an important site for the red-capped plover

The Dampier Saltworks Important Bird Area is a 52 km^{2} saltern lying close to the town of Dampier, an industrial port in the Pilbara region of north-west Western Australia. The salt processing facility is operated by Dampier Salt Ltd, part of the Rio Tinto Group.

== Birds ==
The solar evaporation ponds at Dampier have been identified by BirdLife International as an Important Bird Area (IBA). They regularly support over 1% of the world populations of the red-capped plover and red-necked stint and similarly support the Oriental plover and sharp-tailed sandpiper occasionally. The saltworks is also home to small numbers of the range-restricted dusky gerygone.

== See also ==
- Port Hedland Saltworks Important Bird Area
