= Matthew Curling Friend =

Matthew Curling Friend (1792–1871) was an Australian inventor and public servant. He was the son of John Friend of Ramsgate and Mary Curling of the Isle of Thanet. He joined the Royal Navy as a Midshipman in July 1806 and was promoted to Lieutenant in February 1815. At the end of the Napoleonic Wars he was put on half pay. Friend then pursued scientific interests and was made a Fellow of the Royal Society in 1820. He subsequently entered Cambridge in 1822 and married Mary Anne Ford in 1826.

Like many other officers on half-pay, Friend was obliged to seek his living in the colonies to support his wife and growing family in respectable circumstances. In 1829 Friend sailed with his family as captain of Wanstead. The wife and daughters of Edward Davy Wedge were on board, ultimately resulting in the marriage of Thomas Wedge with daughter Anna Maria Friend.

With his wife he stayed at the Swan River Colony from 30 January 1830 until 19 March, before leaving for Tasmania. While at the Swan River he collected mammal and bird specimens. Wanstead arrived in Hobart Town in April 1830.

He presented his collection of specimens of flora and fauna from the Australian continent at the Zoological Society in England during 1831. Friend was a member of the Royal Society of London.

Friend arrived back in Van Diemen’s Land in 1832 with other members of his family, this time on the Norval. Friend was appointed Port Officer in Launceston in 1832 and also engaged in pastoral pursuits. Friend was involved in controversy relating to his appointment as Port Officer, and eventually won a libel action.

Friend was also at the centre of cultural and scientific life in the colony. He lectured on natural history, helped organise the first Tamar Regatta in 1830, and assisted greatly with the Launceston Horticultural Society and the local committee of the Hobart Town Launceston and Port Phillip Steam Ship Company.

Ill health and increasing blindness forced him to resign in 1852, and he and his second wife returned to England, where he died at Clevedon, Somerset, in October 1871. During his last years he continued his interest in nautical science, inventing an indicator compass and the pelorus for measuring the local magnetism in iron ships.
