= List of shipwrecks in September 1846 =

The list of shipwrecks in September 1846 includes ships sunk, foundered, wrecked, grounded, or otherwise lost during September 1846.

== 1 September ==
List of shipwrecks: 1 September 1846
Ship	State	Description
Carib	France	The ship departed from La Rochelle, Charente-Maritime for New York, United States. No further trace, presumed foundered with the loss of all hands.
Harbinger	United Kingdom	The ship was driven ashore at Redcar, Yorkshire. She was on a voyage from Scarborough, Yorkshire to Warkworth, Northumberland. She was refloated and resumed her voyage.
Loch Ryan	United Kingdom	The steamship ran aground on the Droogden, in the North Sea and was damaged. She was on a voyage from Tönning, Duchy of Holstein to London. She was refloated and put back to Tönning.
Mariner	United Kingdom	The ship was driven ashore at Redcar. She was on a voyage from Plymouth, Devon to Seaham, County Durham. She was refloated and resumed her voyage.

== 2 September ==
List of shipwrecks: 2 September 1846
Ship	State	Description
Helen Stewart	United Kingdom	The ship departed from Whampoa. China for Shanghai. No further trace, presumed foundered with the loss of all hands.

== 3 September ==
List of shipwrecks: 3 September 1846
Ship	State	Description
Doubletten	France	The ship departed from Enez, Ottoman Empire for Marseille, Bouches-du-Rhône. No further trace, presumed foundered in the Mediterranean Sea with the loss of all hands.
Elizabeth	United Kingdom	The ship departed from Newcastle upon Tyne, Northumberland for Galaţi, Ottoman Empire. No further trace, presumed foundered with the loss of all hands.
Martha	United Kingdom	The ship ran aground on The Shingles, off the Isle of Wight. She was on a voyage from Liverpool, Lancashire to Antwerp, Belgium. She was refloated and put in to Ramsgate, Kent in a leaky condition.
Sophia Moffatt	United Kingdom	The ship ran aground on a reef off Green Island. She was on a voyage from London to Quebec City, Province of Canada, British North America. She was later refloated and completed her voyage, arriving on 7 September.

== 4 September ==
List of shipwrecks: 4 September 1846
Ship	State	Description
Beau Ideal	United Kingdom	The ship departed from Salcombe, Devon for Saint John's, Newfoundland, British North America. No further trace, presumed foundered with the loss of all hands.
Diana	United Kingdom	The whaler, a schooner, was wrecked on Desolation Island, South Shetland Islands. Her crew were rescued.
Prince	United Kingdom	The ship was driven ashore on Green Island, Province of Canada, British North America.

== 5 September ==
List of shipwrecks: 5 September 1846
Ship	State	Description
China	United Kingdom	The ship ran aground on the Manicougan Shoals. She was consequently dismantled in situ.
Coolangatta	(United Kingdom of Great Britain and Ireland) New South Wales	The schooner was driven ashore north of the mouth of the River Tweed.
Cousin Mary	United Kingdom	The ship sank on the Redcliffe Sand, in the Humber. She was on a voyage from Woodbridge, Suffolk to Wakefield, Yorkshire. She was refloated on 17 September and found to be severely damaged.
Detroit	(United Kingdom of Great Britain and Ireland) British North America	The ship was driven ashore on Cape Sable Island, Nova Scotia, British North America. She was on a voyage from London to Pictou, Nova Scotia.
Providence	United Kingdom	The ship ran aground on the Faxfleet Sand, in the Humber. She capsized and sank. Her crew were rescued.

== 6 September ==
List of shipwrecks: 6 September 1846
Ship	State	Description
Antoine	Belgium	The barque was driven ashore at Galveston, Texas, United States.
Isabella	United Kingdom	The ship was driven ashore on North Ronaldsay, Orkney Islands. She was on a voyage from Sunderland, County Durham to Saint John, New Brunswick, British North America. She was refloated but consequently sank. Her crew were rescued.
Venezuela	United Kingdom	The steamship ran aground in the River Thames at Rotherhithe, Kent. She was on a voyage from London to Havre de Grâce, Seine-Inférieure, France. She was refloated.

== 7 September ==
List of shipwrecks: 7 September 1846
Ship	State	Description
Hoffnung	Hamburg	The ship was driven ashore on Ameland, Friesland, Netherlands. Her crew were rescued. She was on a voyage from Goole, Yorkshire to Hamburg. Hoffnung was consequently condemned.
Koning der Nederlanden	Netherlands	The ship was driven ashore and wrecked at "Poele Dafour", Netherlands East Indies. She was on a voyage from Amsterdam, North Holland to Batavia, Netherlands East Indies.
Isabella	United Kingdom	The sloop ran aground on the Black Rocks, off the coast of Lothian.

== 8 September ==
List of shipwrecks: 8 September 1846
Ship	State	Description
Peter G. Washington	United States Coast Survey	Peter G. Washington The survey brig was wrecked in a hurricane in the Atlantic Ocean off North Carolina with the loss of 11 lives.
Express	United Kingdom	The schooner foundered in the Atlantic Ocean off Tory Island, County Donegal with the loss of all hands.

== 9 September ==
List of shipwrecks: 9 September 1846
Ship	State	Description
Rosebud	United Kingdom	The brig struck the Oscars, in the North Channel and sank. Her crew were rescued. She was on a voyage from St. Davids, Pembrokeshire to Newcastle upon Tyne, Northumberland.
Sjofna	Norway	The yacht foundered in the Norwegian Sea off Stadt. Her crew were rescued.

== 10 September ==
List of shipwrecks: 10 September 1846
Ship	State	Description
Anna Maria	United Kingdom	The sloop sprang a leak and sank 2 nautical miles (3.7 km) south of Aberystwyth, Cardiganshire. Her crew were rescued.
Caroline	United Kingdom	The ship was driven ashore at Marsala, Sicily. She was on a voyage from Smyrna, Ottoman Empire to Gloucester. She was refloated on 13 September and put in to Malta, where she arrived on 15 September.
Forager	United Kingdom	The barque was abandoned in the Atlantic Ocean. Her crew were rescued by Spring (United Kingdom). She was on a voyage from Havana, Cuba to London.
Loyalty	United Kingdom	The ship was foundered 10 nautical miles (19 km) south east of Fowey, Cornwall. Her crew were rescued. She was on a voyage from Helford, Cornwall to Plymouth, Devon.
USS Shark	United States Navy	The schooner, under Captain Howison, was wrecked at the mouth of the Columbia River. Her crew made it ashore without loss of life.

== 11 September ==
List of shipwrecks: 11 September 1846
Ship	State	Description
March	United Kingdom	The ship ran aground and was wrecked at Arkhangelsk, Russia. She was on a voyage from Arkhangelsk to London.
Only Daughter	(United Kingdom of Great Britain and Ireland) British North America	The schooner was abandoned at sea. Both crew were rescued by Cremona (United Kingdom).
Venus	United Kingdom	The ship departed from Eastport, Maine, United States for Liverpool, Lancashire. No further trace, presumed foundered with the loss of all hands.
William Stoveld	United Kingdom	The ship ran aground on the Taman Bank, in the Strait of Kerch with the loss of her captain. She was on a voyage from Taganrog, Russia to Cork or Falmouth, Cornwall. She was refloated.

== 12 September ==
List of shipwrecks: 12 September 1846
Ship	State	Description
Agnes	United Kingdom	The ship was driven ashore and wrecked on Barbados.
Arrow	(United Kingdom of Great Britain and Ireland) Virgin Islands	The brigantine was driven ashore on Grenada.
Dapper	(United Kingdom of Great Britain and Ireland) Antigua	The sloop was driven ashore on the north coast of Antigua.
George Polloc	United States	The ship ran aground and was holed by an anchor at New York. She was on a voyage from New York to Curaçao.
Janet and Mary	United Kingdom	The ship ran aground at Kronstadt, Russia. She was on a voyage from Kronstadt to Leith, Lothian. She was refloated on 14 September.
Johan Auguste	Sweden	The ship was wrecked off Gothenburg.
Mary Ann Peters	United Kingdom	The ship was driven ashore on the Horseshoe Bank. She was refloated on 14 September and put back to Quebec City, Province of Canada, British North America.
Manchester	United Kingdom	The ship was driven ashore and wrecked on Barbados.
Nautilus	United Kingdom	The ship was driven ashore at Helsingør, Denmark. She was on a voyage from South Shields, County Durham to Saint Petersburg, Russia. She was refloated and resumed her voyage.
Ocean Star	United Kingdom	The ship was wrecked in Raine Bay, Madagascar. She was on a voyage from South Shields to Aden.

== 13 September ==
List of shipwrecks: 13 September 1846
Ship	State	Description
Adriana	United Kingdom	The ship departed from the Virginia Capes for Demerara, British Guiana. No further trace, presumed foundered with the loss of all hands.
Clara	United States	The brig struck a sunken rock and was damaged at Porto Plata, Saint Domingo.
Desire	France	The ship ran aground on the Long Sand, in the North Sea off the coast of Essex, United Kingdom. She was on a voyage from Gothenburg, Sweden to L'Orient, Morbihan. She was refloated but consequently sank. Her crew were rescued.
Hoppet	Rostock	The ship was wrecked at "Salfvoref". She was on a voyage from Rostock to Turku, Grand Duchy of Finland.
Indemnity	United Kingdom	The ship was driven ashore and wrecked at Narva, Russia. Her crew were rescued.
Konigin	Stettin	The ship was driven ashore and wrecked near Swinemünde, Prussia. Her crew were rescued. She was on a voyage from Middlesbrough, Yorkshire, United Kingdom to Stettin.

== 14 September ==
List of shipwrecks: 14 September 1846
Ship	State	Description
Alexander Forbes	United Kingdom	The ship was destroyed by fire at "Arth Hope", Orkney Islands. She was on a voyage from Sunderland, County Durham to Thurso, Caithness.
Egersund	Norway	The ship collided with Weichsel ( Danzig) and sank off the coast of Norway. Her crew were rescued.
Gnome	United Kingdom	The steamboat was in collision with the steamship Ruby (United Kingdom) and sank in the River Thames at Grays, Essex. All on board were rescued by Ruby. Gnome was operating an excursion from London to the Nore and back.
Thomas	United Kingdom	The ship was wrecked on the Millevaches Shoals.

== 15 September ==
List of shipwrecks: 15 September 1846
Ship	State	Description
Betsey	United Kingdom	The ship ran aground in the River Neath and was severely damaged. She was refloated on 17 September.
Charlotte	United Kingdom	The ship was driven ashore at Memel, Prussia. Her crew were rescued. She was on a voyage from Pillau, Prussia to Whitby, Yorkshire. Charlotte had become a wreck by 21 September.
Margaretta	Norway	The ship ran aground off "Skarpsunde Molen" and was wrecked with the loss of ten of her thirteen crew. She was on a voyage from Onega, Russia to Havre de Grâce, Seine-Inférieure, France.
Ostergotland	Sweden	The sloop was wrecked near Stockholm. She was on a voyage from Burg, Duchy of Schleswig to Kalmar.
Port Packet	United Kingdom	The ship ran aground on the Long Sand, in the North Sea off the coast of Essex and was abandoned by her crew. She was on a voyage from London to Antwerp, Belgium. She was later refloated and towed in to Harwich in a waterlogged condition.
Warlock	United Kingdom	The ship was driven ashore and wrecked at Chinchew, China. Her crew were rescued.

== 16 September ==
List of shipwrecks: 16 September 1846
Ship	State	Description
Eucharis	Norway	The ship ran aground off Ljugarn. Sweden. She was on a voyage from Sundsvall, Sweden to London, United Kingdom. She was refloated and resumed her voyage.
John White	United Kingdom	The ship was driven ashore near the Agger Canal, Denmark. Her crew were rescued. She was on a voyage from Sunderland, County Durham to Saint Petersburg, Russia.
Lord Goodridge	United Kingdom	The ship was partly abandoned in the Arctic Ocean. Eight crew were taken off by William (United Kingdom). Lord Goodridge was on a voyage from Onega, Russia to London.
Pusey Hall	United Kingdom	The ship ran aground at Santa Cruz, Patagonia while engaged in acquiring guano. She was subsequently refloated but found to have suffered irreparable damage.
Robert and Hannah	United Kingdom	The ship ran aground at Redcar, Yorkshire. She sank the next day.
Triton	United Kingdom	The ship was sighted whilst on a voyage from London to Cuba. No further trace, presumed foundered with the loss of all hands.

== 17 September ==
List of shipwrecks: 17 September 1846
Ship	State	Description
Fidelity	United Kingdom	The ship ran aground at Port Talbot, Glamorgan.
New York	United States	The paddle steamer foundered in a hurricane in the Gulf of Mexico with the loss of seventeen lives.
Tirga	United Kingdom	The ship departed from Matanzas, Cuba for Cowes, Isle of Wight. No further trace, presumed foundered with the loss of all hands.

== 18 September ==
List of shipwrecks: 18 September 1846
Ship	State	Description
Arragon	United States	The ship was wrecked off the Sand Heads, India. Her crew were rescued. She was on a voyage from Boston, Massachusetts to Calcutta, India.
Cicero	United Kingdom	The ship was driven ashore at Savanilla, Republic of New Granada. She was on a voyage from Savanilla to Liverpool, Lancashire. She subsequently floated off, no further trace.
Cuthbert	United Kingdom	The brig was driven ashore north of Flamborough Head, Yorkshire. She was refloated.
Dove	United States	The ship was driven ashore in the Gut of Canso.
Duncan	United States	The ship departed from New York for the Clyde. No further trace, presumed foundered with the loss of all hands.
George Canning	United Kingdom	The ship was wrecked between Pará and Maranhão, Brazil. Her crew were rescued. She was on a voyage from Liverpool, Lancashire to Maranhão.
Helen Jane	United Kingdom	The ship foundered in the Atlantic Ocean with the loss of six of her twelve crew. She was on a voyage from British Honduras to London.
Hulda	Hamburg	The ship foundered between Langeoog and Spiekeroog, Kingdom of Hanover. She was on a voyage from Calcutta, India to Hamburg.
Sir Robert Frankland	United Kingdom	The brig was driven ashore north of Flamborough Head. She was refloated.
Young	United Kingdom	The brig was driven ashore north of Flamborough Head. She was refloated.

== 19 September ==
List of shipwrecks: 19 September 1846
Ship	State	Description
Annandale	United Kingdom	The ship was abandoned in the Atlantic Ocean with the loss of a crew member.
Dartford	(United Kingdom of Great Britain and Ireland) British North America	The schooner was wrecked at Bay Bulls, Newfoundland.
Eliza	United Kingdom	The ship was abandoned in the Atlantic Ocean with some loss of life. Survivors were rescued by Lord Sandon (United Kingdom).
Emperor	United Kingdom	The brig was abandoned in the Atlantic Ocean with the loss of five of her nine crew. They were rescued by Industry (United Kingdom). Emperor was on a voyage from Stockton-on-Tees, County Durham to Quebec City, Province of Canada, British North America.
Hants	United Kingdom	The ship capsized in the Atlantic Ocean. Her crew were rescued on 22 September by Pomona (United Kingdom). Hants was on a voyage from Saint John, New Brunswick, British North America to Aberdeen.
John	United Kingdom	The ship was wrecked on the "Ourscheere" with the loss of at least four lives. She was on a voyage from Strömsholm, Sweden to an English port.
Ocean	United Kingdom	The ship sprang a leak and was abandoned in the Atlantic Ocean. Her crew were rescued by Ruby ( (United Kingdom of Great Britain and Ireland) ).
Pomona	United Kingdom	The ship was abandoned in the Atlantic Ocean. Nineteen crew were rescued by Patrick Henry (United Kingdom), others were rescued by the barque Nova Scotia ( (United Kingdom of Great Britain and Ireland) British North America). Pomona was on a voyage from Saint John, New Brunswick, British North America to Liverpool, Lancashire.
Rosamond	United Kingdom	The barque was abandoned at sea with the loss of four of her crew. Survivors were rescued by the fishing brig Jacques (France). Rosamond was on a voyage from Quebec City to Liverpool.
Sirion	(United Kingdom of Great Britain and Ireland) British North America	The ship capsized in the Atlantic Ocean. She was abandoned on 21 September. Her crew were rescued by Thetis (United Kingdom).
Sisters	United Kingdom	The ship was driven ashore in Freshwater Bay.
William Watson	United Kingdom	The ship ran aground at Llanelly, Glamorgan and was severely damaged. She was on a voyage from Llanelly to London. She was refloated.

== 20 September ==
List of shipwrecks: 20 September 1846
Ship	State	Description
Anne Marie	United Kingdom	The ship was driven ashore near Harboøre, Denmark. Her crew were rescued. She was on a voyage from London to a Baltic port.
Brave	United Kingdom	The ship foundered in the Atlantic Ocean with the loss of all but one of her crew.
Ellen Jane	United Kingdom	The barque was partly abandoned in the Atlantic Ocean, eight crew taking to the long boat, leaving five on board. Two of them survived to be rescued on 27 October by Rose and Eliza (United Kingdom) Ellen Jane was on a voyage from Belize City, British Honduras to London.
Hill	United Kingdom	The ship capsized in the Atlantic Ocean. Her crew were rescued by Lord Glenelg (United Kingdom). Hill was on a voyage from Tralee, County Kerry to Quebec City, Province of Canada, British North America.
Jacoba	Spain	The barque was driven ashore and wrecked at Charleston, South Carolina, United States. Her crew were rescued. She was on a voyage from Havana, Cuba to Cowes, Isle of Wight, United Kingdom.
Martha	United Kingdom	The ship foundered in the Atlantic Ocean (48°08′N 50°00′W). Her crew were rescued.
Normahul	United Kingdom	The ship was abandoned at sea. Her crew were rescued by Jacques (France).
Spring	United Kingdom	The sloop was driven ashore on Stroma, Orkney Islands. She was on a voyage from Peterhead, Aberdeenshire to an Irish port. She was refloated and put in to Stromness, Orkney Islands.
St. John's Packet	(United Kingdom of Great Britain and Ireland) British North America	The ship was abandoned in the Atlantic Ocean. Her crew were rescued by Louisiana (United States). Saint John's Packet was on a voyage from Saint John, New Brunswick to London.
Victoria	United Kingdom	The ship was driven ashore and capsized at Ventava, Courland Governorate. Her crew were rescued. She was on a voyage from Liverpool, Lancashire to Ventspils.
Voltigeur	France	The ship ran aground on the Lille Klamp. She was on a voyage from Saint Petersburg, Russia to Nantes, Loire-Inférieure. She was later refloated and put in to Rørvig, Norway, proceeding the next day.

== 21 September ==
List of shipwrecks: 21 September 1846
Ship	State	Description
Anna	Netherlands	The ship was driven ashore on Hogland, Russia. She was on a voyage from Saint Petersburg, Russia to Schiedam, South Holland.
Catherina Maria	Stralsund	The ship was driven ashore on Hiddensee, Prussia. Her crew were rescued.
Chieftain	United Kingdom	The ship sprang a leak off Fårö, Sweden. She was abandoned the next day. Her crew were rescued. She was on a voyage from Inverkeithing, Fife to Saint Petersburg, Russia.
Cornelia	United Kingdom	The ship was abandoned in the Atlantic Ocean. Her crew were rescued by Culso (United Kingdom). Cornelia was on a voyage from Saint John, New Brunswick, British North America to the Clyde.
Dalmarnock	United Kingdom	The ship was abandoned in the Atlantic Ocean with the loss of all but four of her crew. Survivors were rescued by Clydesdale (United Kingdom.
Findlay	United Kingdom	The ship ran aground on the Nore. She was on a voyage from South Shields, County Durham to London. She was refloated and resumed her voyage.
Jane	(United Kingdom of Great Britain and Ireland) New Zealand	The schooner ran aground and was wrecked at Long Point on Māhia Peninsula.
Lady Raffles	United Kingdom	The ship was abandoned in the Atlantic Ocean. Her crew were rescued by Queen (United Kingdom). Lady Raffles was on a voyage from Saguenay, Province of Canada, British North America to London.
Lanark	United Kingdom	The ship was abandoned in the Atlantic Ocean. Her crew were rescued by Superior (United Kingdom). Lanark was on a voyage from Quebec City, Province of Canada to Liverpool, Lancashire.
Louisa	United Kingdom	The barque was wrecked on the coast of Newfoundland, British North America. Her passengers and crew were rescued the next day by Lord Sandon (United Kingdom).
Rasamala	United Kingdom	The ship was abandoned in the Atlantic Ocean with the loss of four of her crew. Survivors were rescued by a French brig. She was on a voyage from Quebec City to Liverpool.
Samdany	United Kingdom	The ship was driven ashore at Saugor, India. She was on a voyage from Calcutta, India to Ceylon.
T. H. Haviland	United Kingdom	The ship was wrecked on Stoneskar, Russia. She was on a voyage from Saint Petersburg to the Clyde.
Victoria	United Kingdom	The ship was abandoned in the Atlantic Ocean. Her crew were rescued by Trafalgar and the brig Torrance (both United Kingdom).
Victoria	United Kingdom	The ship capsized at Ventava, Courland Governorate. Her crew were rescued.

== 22 September ==
List of shipwrecks: 22 September 1846
Ship	State	Description
Agenoria	United Kingdom	The brig was abandoned in the Atlantic Ocean. Her six crew were rescued by Joanna (United Kingdom). Agenoria was on a voyage from Quebec City, Province of Canada, British North America to Exeter, Devon.
Cecilia	United Kingdom	The ship was abandoned in the Atlantic Ocean. Her crew were rescued by Iona (United Kingdom).
Count de Paris	France	The ship was abandoned in the Atlantic Ocean. Her eleven surviving crew were rescued by Marchioness of Clydesdale (United Kingdom). Count de Paris was on a voyage from the Grand Banks of Newfoundland to La Rochelle, Charente-Maritime.
Flora Macdonald	United Kingdom	The ship was abandoned in the Atlantic Ocean. Her crew were rescued by Corsair (United Kingdom). Flora Macdonald was on a voyage from Dublin to Saint Stephen, New Brunswick, British North America.
Friedrich Carl	Hamburg	The ship ran aground and sank at the mouth of the Elbe. Her crew were rescued. She was on a voyage from Hull, Yorkshire, United Kingdom to Hamburgh.
Great Britain	United Kingdom	Great Britain The passenger ship ran aground in Dundrum Bay. She was on a voyage from Liverpool, Lancashire to New York, United States. She was refloated on 25 August 1847 and taken in to Liverpool.
Guadiana	United Kingdom	The ship was driven ashore and wrecked at Narva, Russia. Her crew were rescued.
Mary Ann	United Kingdom	The ship was abandoned in the Atlantic Ocean. All on board were rescued by Gypsey, Lord Sandon and Thetis (all United Kingdom). Mary Ann was on a voyage from Saint John, New Brunswick, British North America to Glasgow, Renfrewshire.
Northesk	United Kingdom	The brig was destroyed by fire at Port Glasgow, Renfrewshire.
Wassily Wiliky	Russia	The ship was wrecked on the south coast of Stoneskar.

== 23 September ==
List of shipwrecks: 23 September 1846
Ship	State	Description
Antonia	United Kingdom	The ship was wrecked on the Goodwin Sands, Kent.
Clifton	United Kingdom	The brig was abandoned in the Atlantic Ocean (46°45′N 41°07′W) with the loss of six of her eleven crew. Survivors were rescued by the barque Secret (United Kingdom).
Dempster	United Kingdom	The brig was abandoned in the Atlantic Ocean with the loss of five of the twelve people on board. Survivors were rescued by Saxon (United Kingdom).
England	United Kingdom	The ship was abandoned in the Atlantic Ocean. Her 27 crew were rescued by Warren (United Kingdom). England was on a voyage from Quebec City, Province of Canada, British North America to Liverpool, Lancashire.
Equity	United Kingdom	The ship was driven ashore and severely damaged at Tynemouth, Northumberland. She was on a voyage from Rouen, Seine-Inférieure, France to South Shields, County Durham. She was refloated on 2 October and beached.
James and Mary Sinnot	United Kingdom	The ship was abandoned in the Atlantic Ocean. Twenty-eight people were rescued by Lord Glenelg (United Kingdom); the remainde were rescued by a French brig.
John and Ann	United Kingdom	The ship was driven ashore near Bridlington, Yorkshire. She was on a voyage from Stockton-on-Tees, County Durham to Spalding, Lincolnshire. She was refloated and taken in to Bridlington.

== 24 September ==
List of shipwrecks: 24 September 1846
Ship	State	Description
Agnes	United Kingdom	The ship was driven ashore and wrecked on Barbados.
Apollo	United Kingdom	The barque was abandoned in the Atlantic Ocean (45°51′N 35°18′W) with the loss of one life. Survivors were rescued by the schooner Paragon (United Kingdom) and the schooner Victoria ( (United Kingdom of Great Britain and Ireland) British North America). Apollo was on a voyage from Dundee, Forfarshire to Montreal, Province of Canada, British North America.
Caleb Angus	United Kingdom	The ship was driven ashore and wrecked on Barbados.
Cove	United Kingdom	The ship was wrecked on the Red Island Reef. She was on a voyage from Hull, Yorkshire to Quebec City, Province of Canada, British North America.
Cromwell	United Kingdom	The ship was abandoned in the Atlantic Ocean. Her 30 crew were rescued by Roscius (United Kingdom). Cromwell was on a voyage from Quebec City to Liverpool, Lancashire.
Deptford	United Kingdom	The ship was abandoned in the Atlantic Ocean. Her crew were rescued by Ruby and Scotsman (both United Kingdom). Deptford was on a voyage from Quebec City to Maldon, Essex.
Fame	United Kingdom	The ship was driven ashore and severely damaged on Barbados.
Flora	United Kingdom	The ship was beached at Milford Haven, Pembrokeshire. She was on a voyage from the Clyde to Cardiff, Glamorgan.
Guiana	(United Kingdom of Great Britain and Ireland) South Australia	The ship was wrecked on a reef near Adelaide.
Isabella	United Kingdom	The ship capsized at Hull, Yorkshire. She was on a voyage from Arkhangelsk, Russia to Hull.
Kron Prins	Flag unknown	The ship was wrecked on the Courdouan Rocks. Her crew were rescued. She was on a voyage from Hull to Bordeaux, Gironde, France.
Manchester	United Kingdom	The ship was driven ashore and wrecked on Barbados.
Margaret Thompson	United Kingdom	The ship was abandoned in the Atlantic Ocean. Her crew were rescued by Lord Eldon (United Kingdom). Margaret Thompson was on a voyage from Donegal to Miramichi, New Brunswick, British North America.
Mary Ann	United Kingdom	The ship was driven ashore and wrecked on Barbados.

== 25 September ==
List of shipwrecks: 25 September 1846
Ship	State	Description
Christopher	United Kingdom	The brig ran aground on the Cross Sand, in the North Sea off the coast of Norfolk. She was refloated and taken in to Great Yarmouth in a leaky condition.
General Wolfe	United Kingdom	The ship was wrecked on the Espirito Santo Reef, off the coast of British Honduras. Her crew were rescued. She was on a voyage from "Zaporte" to Liverpool, Lancashire.
Harvey	United Kingdom	The ship was driven ashore near the Montmorency Falls, Province of Canada, British North America. She was refloated on 27 September and taken in to "Cul de Sac".
New Brunswick	(United Kingdom of Great Britain and Ireland) British North America	The barque was abandoned in the Atlantic Ocean. Her crew were rescued by Henry (United Kingdom). New Brunswick was on a voyage from Londonderry to Saint Andrews, New Brunswick.
St. Andrew	United Kingdom	The ship was driven ashore and wrecked near the Montmorency Falls, in the Saint Lawrence River. All on board were rescued. She was on a voyage from the Clyde to Montreal, Province of Canada, British North America.

== 26 September ==
List of shipwrecks: 26 September 1846
Ship	State	Description
Antelope	Norway	The ship was run down and sunk off "Tomfrueland" by Gogstadt's Minde (Norway) with the loss of eight of her crew.
Aristomini	Ottoman Empire	The ship was lost at Sulina.
Diadem	United Kingdom	The ship departed from New York, United States for Hull, Yorkshire. No further trace, presumed foundered with the loss of all hands.
John Lloyd	United Kingdom	The schooner was run down and sunk in the Irish Sea by the East Indiaman Lord Dufflyn (United Kingdom) 10 nautical miles (19 km) off Tory Island, County Donegal with the loss of all but three of her crew. They took to a boat and were rescued the next day by Juliet (United Kingdom), John Lloyd was on a voyage from Arkhangelsk, Russia to Belfast, County Antrim. The wreck came ashore on Tiree on 3 October.
Pytheus	France	The polacca brig was wrecked on the Longsand, in the North Sea off the coast of Essex, United Kingdom. Her crew were rescued by HMRC Desmond ( Board of Customs). She was on a voyage from Newcastle upon Tyne, Northumberland, United Kingdom to Dunkirk, Nord, Bayonne, Basses-Pyrénées and Oran, Algeria.
Waterloo	United Kingdom	The ship ran aground on the Swarefort Reef. She was on a voyage from Riga, Russia to London. She was refloated and put in to Helsingør, Denmark.

== 27 September ==
List of shipwrecks: 27 September 1846
Ship	State	Description
Gipsy	United Kingdom	The brig ran aground on the Cockle Sand, in the North Sea off the coast of Norfolk. She was refloated.
Hope	United Kingdom	The ship foundered in the North Sea 10 nautical miles (19 km) off Sheringham, Norfolk. Her crew were rescued.
Lyra	United Kingdom	The schooner was driven ashore at Spiddal, County Galway. She was on a voyage from Liverpool, Lancashire to Galway.
Oriental	France	The ship ran aground off São João da Barra, Brazil with the loss of two lives. She was on a voyage from Havre de Grâce, Seine-Inférieure to Rio de Janeiro, Brazil.

== 28 September ==
List of shipwrecks: 28 September 1846
Ship	State	Description
Betsy and Isabella	United Kingdom	The sloop was holed by an anchor and sank at South Shields, County Durham. She was refloated and repaired.
Carnatic	United Kingdom	The ship was wrecked at Middleton Point, India.
Eugene	France	The ship was wrecked near Aigues-Mortes, Gard. She was on a voyage from Riga, Russia to Marseille, Bouches-du-Rhône.
Guardian	United Kingdom	The ship sank at Narva, Russia.
Hercule	France	The ship sank off Whitehill Point, County Durham, United Kingdom. She was on a voyage from South Shields, County Durham to Toulon, Var, France. She was refloated on 5 October and beached.
Raven	United Kingdom	The ship ran aground on the Seskar Reef, in the Baltic Sea. She subsequently became a wreck.

== 29 September ==
List of shipwrecks: 29 September 1846
Ship	State	Description
Elizabeth	United Kingdom	The ship was abandoned in the Atlantic Ocean by all but one of her carpenters, who were rescued by Northumberland (United States). The carpenter was taken off the next day.
Hercule	France	The ship was holed by an anchor and sank off Whitehill Point, Ireland.

== 30 September ==
List of shipwrecks: 30 September 1846
Ship	State	Description
Ann	United Kingdom	The schooner ran aground on the Sandhammer. She was on a voyage from Riga, Russia to Hull, Yorkshire. She was refloated and put in to Ystad, Sweden.
Beatrice	United Kingdom	The ship was driven ashore at the mouth of the Saint Charles River. She was on a voyage from Cardiff, Glamorgan to Quebec City, Province of Canada, British North America. She was refloated on 2 October.
Commerce	(United Kingdom of Great Britain and Ireland) British North America	The ship was abandoned in the Atlantic Ocean. Her crew were rescued by Roscius (United Kingdom). She was on a voyage from Quebec City, Province of Canada to Liverpool, Lancashire.
Cove	United Kingdom	The ship was wrecked on the Red Island Reef.
Douglas	(United Kingdom of Great Britain and Ireland) Isle of Man	The ship was driven ashore on the Pollock Rocks, near Douglas. She was refloated.
Mercur	Kingdom of Hanover	The ship was wrecked on the Swedish coast with the loss of seven of her eight crew. She was on a voyage from Saint Petersburg, Russia to Havre de Grâce, Seine-Inférieure, France.
Robert Stride	United Kingdom	The ship was wrecked on Green Island, British North America.

== Unknown date ==
List of shipwrecks: Unknown date in September 1846
Ship	State	Description
Agenoria	United Kingdom	The ship was abandoned in the Atlantic Ocean before 26 September.
Brothers	(United Kingdom of Great Britain and Ireland) British North America	The ship was abandoned in the Atlantic Ocean before 24 September.
Bowyer Smith	United Kingdom	The ship ran aground on Brier Island, Nova Scotia, British North America. She was on a voyage from Saint John, New Brunswick, British North America to Liverpool, Lancashire. She was refloated and put back to Saint John, where she arrived on 13 September.
Caroline	Sweden	The ship was abandoned in the Atlantic Ocean before 24 September. She was on a voyage from Stockholm, Sweden to New York.
Cato	United Kingdom	The barque was abandoned in the Atlantic Ocean before 23 September. Some of her crew were rescued by Mary Ann (United Kingdom).
Chapman	United Kingdom	The ship ran aground on the Saguenay Reef. She was refloated on 29 September and towed in to Quebec City, Province of Canada, British North America.
Cologne	France	The whaler was wrecked on Banks Peninsula, New Zealand before 9 September. Her crew were rescued.
Condor	Bremen	The brig was driven ashore and wrecked at Punta Maternilla, Cuba in early September.
Courrier	Netherlands	The ship departed from Saint George del Mina, Dutch Guinea in early September for Amsterdam, North Holland. No further trace, presumed foundered with the loss of all hands.
Dolphin	(United Kingdom of Great Britain and Ireland) British North America	The ship was wrecked at Dominica with the loss of a crew member.
Eclipse	United Kingdom	The barque was abandoned in the Atlantic Ocean before 9 September. Her sixteen crew were rescued by William Henry (United Kingdom). Eclipse was on a voyage from London to the Saint Lawrence River.
Elizabeth	United Kingdom	The ship was abandoned in the Atlantic Ocean before 25 September. Fourteen of her fifteen crew were rescued by Northumberland (United Kingdom), the ship's carpenter refusing to leave. Elizabeth was on a voyage from London to Quebec City.
Elvira	United Kingdom	The brig was abandoned in the Atlantic Ocean before 27 September. Her crew were rescued by Hebe (United Kingdom). She was on a voyage from Prince Edward Island, British North America to Liverpool, Lancashire.
Emerald	(United Kingdom of Great Britain and Ireland) British North America	The full-rigged ship was abandoned in the Atlantic Ocean between 19 and 22 September.
Fortitude	United Kingdom	The brig was abandoned in the Atlantic Ocean before 23 September.
Freiheden	Norway	The ship was lost in the North Sea before 17 September. Two crew survived.
George Canning	United Kingdom	The brig was wrecked at Trinidad da Cuba, Cuba.
Good Intent	United Kingdom	The ship ran aground at the entrance of the Dardanelles before 5 September. She was on a voyage from Liverpool, Lancashire to Constantinople, Ottoman Empire.
Intrepid, or Rapid	United Kingdom	The brig was abandoned in the Atlantic Ocean before 23 September. Eight crew were rescued by Samuel (United Kingdom).
Isabella	(United Kingdom of Great Britain and Ireland) Van Diemen's Land	The schooner was wrecked at Port Albert, New South Wales before 15 September. Her crew survived.
James Scott	United Kingdom	The ship sank at Antwerp, Belgium. She was refloated on 26 September.
Joseph and Mary	United Kingdom	The brig was abandoned in the Atlantic Ocean before 22 September.
Kate	United Kingdom	The ship ran aground in the Traverse. She was refloated and beached on Goose Island. She was on a voyage from Cromarty to Quebec City. Kate was refloated and towed in to Quebec City, arriving on 7 September.
Kate	United Kingdom	The brig was abandoned in the Atlantic Ocean before 23 September. Seven crew were rescued by Samuel (United Kingdom).
King	United Kingdom	The ship was abandoned in the Strait of Sunda before 20 September.
Kingston	United Kingdom	The ship was abandoned in the Atlantic Ocean before 23 September.
Lord John Russell	United Kingdom	The ship was abandoned in the Atlantic Ocean before 29 September. She was on a voyage from Cowes, Isle of Wight to Quebec City.
Margaret and Ann	United Kingdom	The ship departed from South Shields, County Durham for Saint-Valery-sur-Somme, France in late September. No further trace, presumed foundered with the loss of all hands.
Olive Branch	United Kingdom	The ship sank at Lewes, Delaware, United States. She was on a voyage from Bristol, Gloucestershire to Boston, Massachusetts, United States.
Promise	United Kingdom	The ship was driven ashore at Point St. Laurent, Province of Canada before 1 October. She was on a voyage from Liverpool to Montreal, Province of Canada. Promise was refloated on 5 October and towed in to Quebec City.
Ruby	United Kingdom	The smack was wrecked on the West Rocks, in the North Sea off the coast of Essex.
Sea Nymph	(United Kingdom of Great Britain and Ireland) British North America	The ship was abandoned in the Atlantic Ocean before 29 September.
Stirlingshire	United Kingdom	The ship ran aground on the Odensholm Reef. She was on a voyage from Leith, Lothian to Saint Petersburg, Russia. She was refloated and completed her voyage, arriving on 24 September.
St. Louis	France	The brig was abandoned in the Atlantic Ocean before 11 October.
Theodore	United Kingdom	The ship caught fire and was abandoned in the Arctic Ocean before 27 September. Her crew were rescued by Sunbeam (United Kingdom).
Treasurer	United Kingdom	The ship departed from Quebec City for Newcastle upon Tyne. No further trace, presumed foundered with the loss of all hands.
