= Condon, Western Australia =

Former settlement and port in Western Australia

Coordinates: 20.001°S 119.377°E

Condon, officially gazetted as Shellborough, is a former settlement and port in the Pilbara region of Western Australia. Originating as an unofficial pearlers' camp in the late 1860s, the town was abandoned some time around 1930. Located on Condon Creek, the former townsite is 15 km east of the mouth of the De Grey River and 86 km east of Port Hedland; it is in the Shire of Port Hedland.

Condon had its origins as an unofficial campsite established by pearlers during the 1860s. At the time, Mystery Landing, on the banks of the De Grey itself, was used by settlers to unload and load livestock, passengers and goods from ships. While Port Hedland had similar origins, as a natural harbour and pearling base, the denser mangroves in that area initially restricted its use.

The origin of the name Condon is unknown. Similar place names nearby, possibly derived from an Indigenous Australian language, include Condina Bore and Condini Landing. Another popular theory suggests that it originated as a misspelling of the surname of Daniel Congdon, who was active in the area as a mariner and pearler. However, the name was first recorded in 1870 as "Condong". The settlement was not surveyed officially and gazetted until 1872, when it was given the name Shellborough – probably a reference to pearlshell. However, the new name was never widely used and the town remained commonly known as Condon.

Condon, like the main pearling base at Tien Tsin Harbour (later Cossack), about 160 km west-south-west, declined in importance as pearling operations gradually shifted north. During the 1880s, the pearling fleet itself shifted from Condon to the newly founded port of Broome about 525 km (325 mi) north east. Similarly, the clearing of mangroves in Port Hedland (and the town's belated gazetting in 1896) had seen its use increase dramatically. While the number of people officially residing in Condon peaked at about 200 in 1898, the population evidently decreased rapidly afterwards. By 1905 only 12 people were officially living in Condon. Subsequently, official services were withdrawn, including the town's telegraph station (closed in 1927) and post office.

The centreline of a solar eclipse, in September 1922, transited close to Condon. The town's location therefore made it one of the places best suited to observations of the eclipse.

== Sources ==
- Landgate, 2021, Town names, Western Australian Land Information Authority.
- Town of Port Hedland, 1996–2019, Condon Creek Townsite, Heritage Council of Western Australia.
