= Town of Port Hedland =

Local government area of Western Australia

Coordinates: 20°18′36″S 118°36′04″E

- Local government area
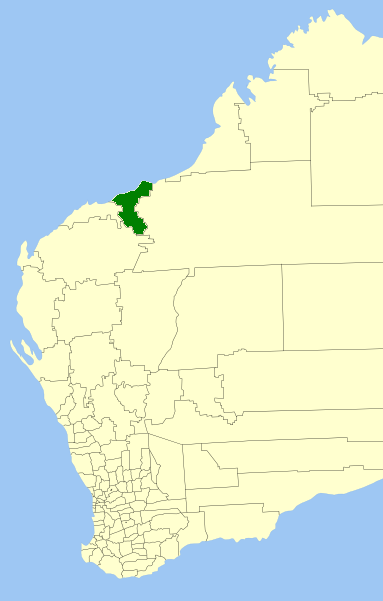
- Location in Western Australia

- Interactive map of Town of Port Hedland
- Country: Australia
- State: Western Australia
- Region: Pilbara
- Council seat: Port Hedland

Government
  - Mayor: None
  - State electorate: Pilbara
  - Federal division: Durack

Area
  - Total: 10,587 km^{2} (4,088 sq mi)

Population
  - Total: 15,684 (LGA 2021)
- Website: Town of Port Hedland
LGAs around Town of Port Hedland
Indian Ocean	Indian Ocean	East Pilbara
Indian Ocean	Town of Port Hedland	East Pilbara
Karratha	Ashburton	East Pilbara

The Town of Port Hedland is a local government area in the Pilbara region of Western Australia containing the twin settlements of Port Hedland and South Hedland and the industrial precinct of Wedgefield. It had a population of approximately 14,500 as at the 2016 Census of which only a few hundred live outside the settlement boundaries.

== History ==
The Pilbara Road District was gazetted on 22 June 1894. It lost some territory to the new Nullagine Road District on 8 July 1898. It was renamed the Port Hedland Road District on 18 March 1904.

It became the Shire of Port Hedland on 1 July 1961 under the Local Government Act 1960, which reformed all remaining road districts into shires. It underwent substantial boundary changes on 28 April 1972, losing approximately 5,669 square kilometres to the Shire of Marble Bar and gaining approximately 18.3 square kilometres from the Shire of Roebourne. It assumed its current name when it gained town status on 18 March 1989.

In June 2019 the council was suspended by the state government and replaced with a commissioner.

In October 2019, the government of Western Australia announced that there would be no further residential development of the West End of Port Hedland to protect sensitive population groups from health effects caused by dust generated by Port activities.

In August 2025, the council was again dissolved following the resignation of five councillors including the mayor.

== Wards ==
The town has eight councillors and no wards.

== Towns and localities ==
The towns and localities of the Port Hedland with population and size figures based on the most recent Australian census:

Locality	Population	Area	Map
Boodarie	182 (SAL 2021)	862.2 km^{2} (332.9 sq mi)	
De Grey	24 (SAL 2021)	3,167.6 km^{2} (1,223.0 sq mi)	
Finucane	0 (SAL 2016)	1.9 km^{2} (0.73 sq mi)	
Indee	16 (SAL 2021)	1,624 km^{2} (627 sq mi)	
Marble Bar *	927 (SAL 2021)	35,032.9 km^{2} (13,526.3 sq mi)	
Mundabullangana	14 (SAL 2021)	2,632 km^{2} (1,016 sq mi)	
Pippingarra	49 (SAL 2021)	882.5 km^{2} (340.7 sq mi)	
Port Hedland	4,081 (SAL 2021)	75.1 km^{2} (29.0 sq mi)	
Redbank	48 (SAL 2021)	9.5 km^{2} (3.7 sq mi)	
South Hedland	11,046 (SAL 2021)	22.3 km^{2} (8.6 sq mi)	
Strelley	41 (SAL 2021)	809.6 km^{2} (312.6 sq mi)	
Wallareenya	0 (SAL 2016)	608.3 km^{2} (234.9 sq mi)	
Wedgefield	127 (SAL 2021)	20.1 km^{2} (7.8 sq mi)	

- (* indicates locality is only partially located within this shire)

== Former towns ==
- Condon (a.k.a. Shellborough)

== Heritage-listed places ==
As of 2023, 81 places are heritage-listed in the Town of Port Hedland, of which seven are on the State Register of Heritage Places.
