= Hedland College =

School in South Hedland

Hedland College was an independent regional training facility located at the corner of Hamilton Road and Forrest Circle in South Hedland, Western Australia, established in 1980 under the Colleges Act 1978 (WA). It catered for trade training offering courses in Metal, Electrical and Automotive trades as well as Hospitality and Childcare.

The college was amalgamated into the Pilbara Institute before the campus was closed at the end of 2015, with services relocated to Pundulmurra College.

Facilities also included student accommodation for remote students to attend block release training located in a number of duplex houses located in the now closed College Court (off Somerset Crescent).
