= Charles Wedge =

Surveyor and explorer

Charles Wedge (1810–1895) was a surveyor and explorer of the North-West regions of Western Australia.

Wedge was born in Cambridgeshire, England; he was the eldest son of Edward Davy Wedge and a nephew of John Helder Wedge. In 1824, he emigrated to the Colony of Van Diemens Land (later Tasmania) with his father, uncle and cousin, John Charles Darke.

Charles Wedge worked initially as an assistant government surveyor with the Survey Department in Van Diemen's Land.

He resigned in 1836, to work with John Helder Wedge on a sheep station in the Port Phillip District (later the Colony of Victoria). Charles Wedge managed the family's property at Werribee and then established a sheep station in the Western District of Victoria.

In 1846 Charles Wedge informed Edward Stone Parker, the Assistant Protector of Aborigines in Port Phillip, that an aboriginal man had been shot by a shepherd in his employ, named John Fox, near the Avoca River. Wedge described this shooting as ‘most wanton and unjustifiable’ and wanted Fox brought to justice. Parker then requested La Trobe send a mounted constable or trooper to apprehend Fox, but Fox fled to South Australia to avoid arrest.

In a letter to Governor Charles Latrobe in 1853 he complained of the troubles with Tjapwurrung aboriginals attacking shepherds and driving away flocks of sheep, to which Wedge wrote:

"these depredations did not cease till many lives were sacrificed, and, I may say, many thousands of sheep destroyed".

In the mid-1860s, he became a shareholder in the Denison Plains Pastoral Company (often referred to as the Denison Plains Association), which was founded with the intention of settling in North-West Australia on the Denison Plains (a remote area in what would be known later as the south-east Kimberley).

Following the failure of the Denison Plains scheme, Wedge was employed at Roebourne as a Western Australian government surveyor. Among other projects, in 1866 the Government Resident, Robert John Sholl tasked Wedge with finding a suitable harbour in the Port Hedland area, to encourage and service settlement further north, in areas such as the De Grey River. The natural harbour of Port Hedland itself was already considered unsuitable, due to the thick mangroves. Following heavy, unseasonal rain and swollen tidal creeks, Wedge was unable to reach the harbour itself or find another site. Wedge reported: "Independently of the Port being difficult of access from the land sides, the want of a natural supply of water must always be a serious impediment to its being made available as a shipping port." He also felt that the deep sand and lack of wood for building made the area unsuitable.

The Port Hedland light industrial estate of Wedgefield, Western Australia was named after Wedge.
