= Shire of Nullagine =

Former local government area in Western Australia

The Shire of Nullagine was a local government area in the Pilbara region of Western Australia.

It was formally established as the Nullagine Road District on 8 July 1898, with part of its territory being severed from the Pilbarra Road District (which evolved into the Town of Port Hedland). It was based in the town of Nullagine. However, its practical establishment and the inaugural election of board members was delayed well into 1899 due to local "differences of opinion".

It was declared a shire and named the Shire of Nullagine with effect from 1 July 1961 following the passage of the Local Government Act 1960, which reformed all remaining road districts into shires.

The shire ceased to exist on 27 May 1972, when it amalgamated with the Shire of Marble Bar to form the Shire of East Pilbara.

Politician Noel Butcher was a member of the Nullagine Roads Board prior to his election to parliament.
