= Peter Hedland =

Peter Hedland originally Lars Peter Hedlund, 14 March 1829 (Hudiksvall, Sweden) – 1881 (Lagrange Bay, Western Australia), was a significant figure in European settlement in North-West Australia. A mariner, explorer, and pearler; he was widely known as "Captain Hedland". Some contemporary accounts and some of Hedland's descendants have spelt the surname Headland, although it is not clear that he ever used this spelling.

In 1863, he and the cutter Mystery he built and captained came to prominence after Hedland informed settlers of the existence of several landing places in the Pilbara region, including Port Hedland.

== Life ==
After emigrating from Sweden to Western Australia in the 1850s, Hedland married Ellen Adams at Fremantle, Western Australia on 15 October 1858.

Hedland built the 16-ton cutter Mystery, at Point Walter on the banks of the Swan River. As its master, he was involved in shipping cargo for the earliest European settlers in the North-West. In early 1863, Hedland discovered the landing at Butcher Inlet (named after the harbour master at Albany) in Tien Tsin (known later as Cossack). That April, the Mystery ran aground in a natural harbour as Hedland searched for a suitable location for a port suitable for the pastoral industry. (While Dutch mariners had visited the area as early as 1628, there is no evidence that they saw the harbour.) Hedland also noted Mystery Landing, in the estuary of the De Grey River, which was named after his cutter.

He operated his small ship, named Mystery, along the North-West coast and made frequent journeys to and from Fremantle to ship cargo for settlers.

In January 1871, Hedland and three other mariners were tried on charges of forcing Aboriginal people to work for them. They were acquitted following a trial at Geraldton in March.

He was allegedly killed near Lagrange Bay in 1881, by Aboriginal people. His remains, and that of his companion were located on an island near Roebuck Bay. There was evidence to show that after his murder the Aboriginal people who attacked him sank his schooner and stole his dingy which they used to escape to the mainland. Hedland was survived by his wife and 11 children.

== Memorials ==
The natural harbour and later town of Port Hedland were named after Hedland, after he became the first European to describe the natural harbour, in June 1863. Port Hedland is known by the Indigenous Kariyarra and Nyamal people as Marapikurrinya, which, as the town's website states, "refers to the hand like formation of the tidal creeks coming off the harbour (marra - hand, pikurri - pointing straight and nya - a place name marker)". According to Dreamtime legend, there was a huge blind water snake living in the landlocked area of water known as Jalkawarrinya. This landlocked area is now the turning basin for the ships that enter the port and as the story goes, "the coming of the big ships meant it was unable to stay".
