= Dampier Salt =

Australian salt company

- Company type: Private
- Industry: Salt production
- Founded: 1972
- Headquarters: Perth, Western Australia
- Products: Salt
- Production output: 9 million tonnes per annum
- Owners: 68.4% Rio Tinto Group; 21.5% Marubeni; 10.1% Sojitz

Dampier Salt is an Australian salt company located in Western Australia, with operations in Dampier and Port Hedland, headquarters in Perth. Since beginning operations at Dampier in 1972, the company has developed into one of the world's largest private salt producers, with production capacity of over four million tonnes per annum at Dampier and nine million tonnes per annum company-wide. Most of this salt is naturally sourced from the Punt Road region and is known for its high purity.

Dampier Salt is 68.4% owned by the Rio Tinto Group, 21.5% by Marubeni, and the remaining 10.1% by Sojitz.

== Important Bird Areas ==
The 52 km^{2} solar evaporation pond complex at Dampier has been identified by BirdLife International as the Dampier Saltworks Important Bird Area, while the 78 km^{2} complex near Port Hedland has been identified as the Port Hedland Saltworks Important Bird Area.

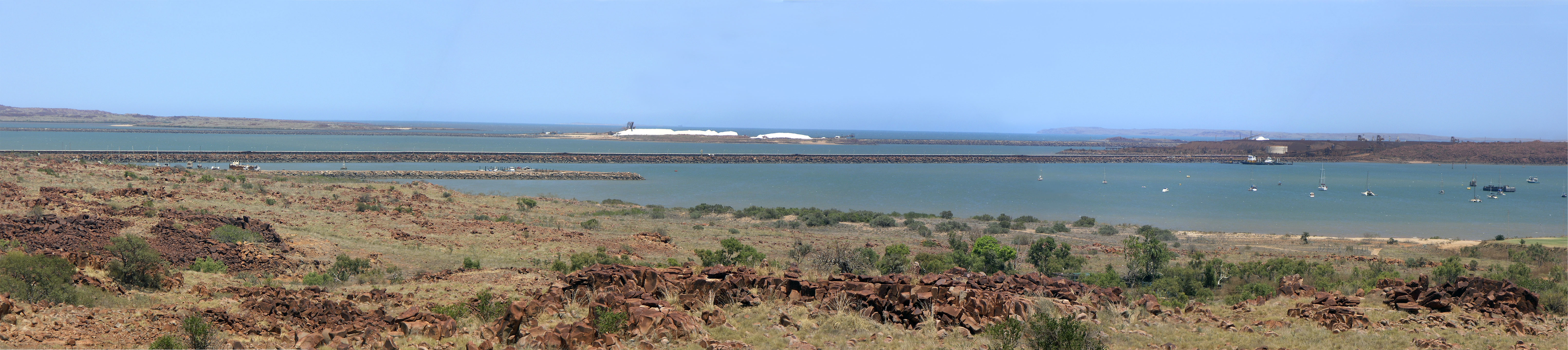
Panorama of saltworks at Dampier, November 2006
