= Port Hedland, Western Australia =

Port Hedland Marapikurrinya (Kariyarra)
- Town
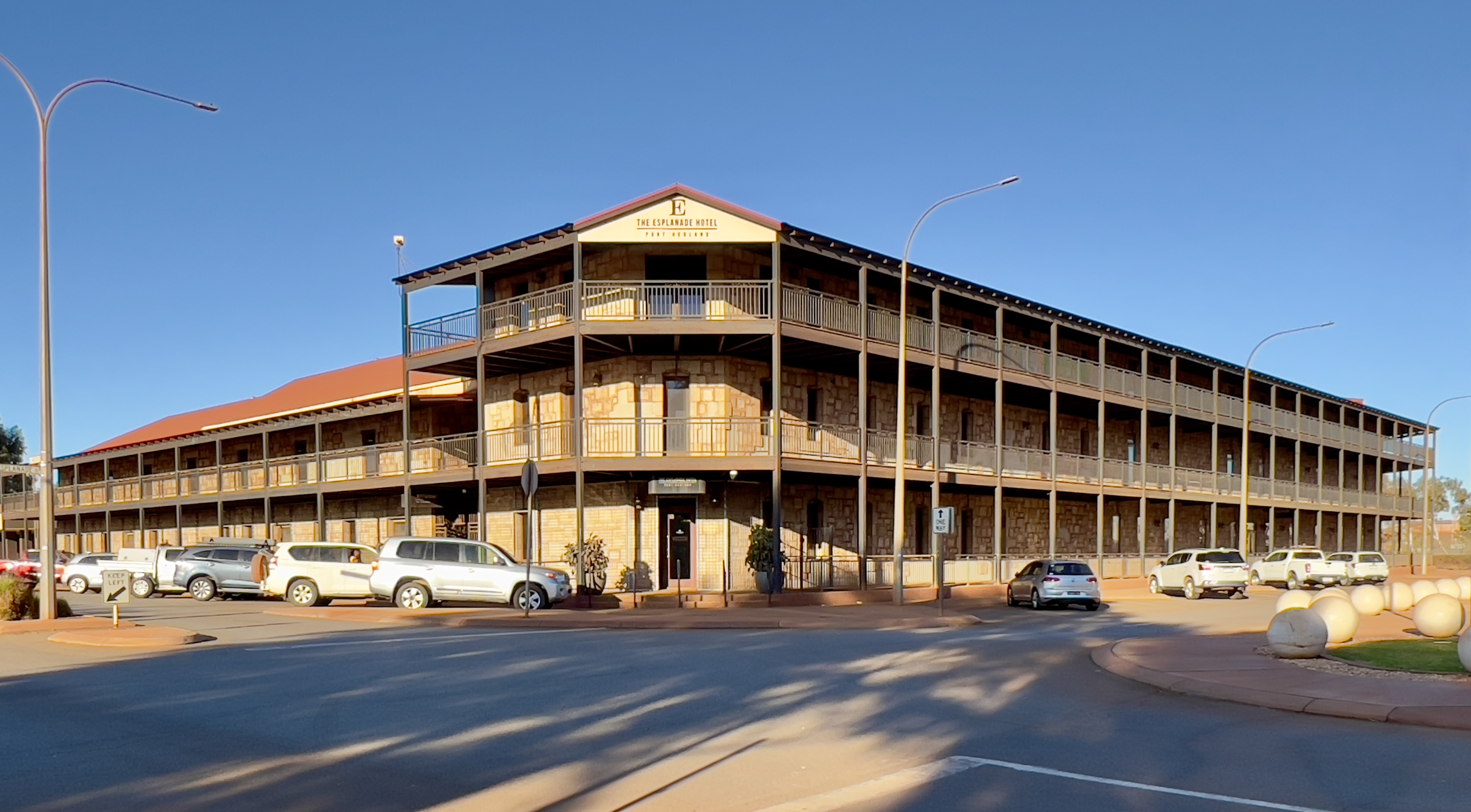
- Esplanade Hotel, Port Hedland, April 2023

- Coordinates: 20°18′36″S 118°36′04″E
- Country: Australia
- State: Western Australia
- LGA: Town of Port Hedland
- Location: 1,322 km (821 mi) from Perth; 612 km (380 mi) from Broome
- Established: 22 October 1896

Government
  - State electorate: Pilbara
  - Federal division: Durack
- Elevation: 6 m (20 ft)

Population
  - Total: 15,298 (2021 census)
- Time zone: UTC+8 (AWST)
- Postcode: 6721
- Mean max temp: 33.3 °C (91.9 °F)
- Mean min temp: 19.5 °C (67.1 °F)
- Annual rainfall: 318.9 mm (12.56 in)

Port Hedland (Kariyarra: Marapikurrinya) is the second largest town in the Pilbara region of Western Australia, with an urban population of 15,298 as of the 2021 census, including the satellite town of South Hedland, 18 kilometres (11 mi) away. It is also the site of the highest tonnage port in Australia.

== Toponymy ==
The town is named after Peter Hedland, master of the ship Mystery, which visited the area in April 1863. Hedland was the first European to note the existence of the harbour adjacent to the present day townsite, and the area's possible use as a port. The name was bestowed later in 1863 by government surveyor Joseph Beete Ridley, during a visit of his own to the area.

Port Hedland is known to the Indigenous Kariyarra and Nyamal people as Marapikurrinya, which, as the town's website states, "refers to the hand like formation of the tidal creeks coming off the harbour (marra - hand, pikurri - pointing straight and nya - a place name marker)".

== History ==
According to Dreamtime legend, there was a huge blind water snake living in the landlocked area of water in the Port Hedland area known as Jalkawarrinya. This landlocked location is now the turning basin for the ships that enter the port and as the story goes, "the coming of the big ships meant it was unable to stay".

The coastline in the area was seen by European mariners as early as 1628, when the Dutch merchant ship Vianen, captained by Gerrit Franszoon de Witt visited.

Swedish-born mariner Peter Hedland was the first European to note the harbour's existence and the possibility of using it as a port. Peter Hedland arrived in the area in April 1863 on board his boat Mystery, which he had built himself at Point Walter on the banks of the Swan River. He named the harbour Mangrove Harbour and reported that it would make a good landing site with a well protected harbour, and that there was also fresh water available. However, the port was initially regarded as unusable, due to a sandbar that frequently sealed the entrance and thick mangroves around the shore; further, the narrow entrance made the harbour difficult to enter in bad weather.

Later in 1863, government surveyor Joseph Beete Ridley examined Mangrove Harbour while exploring the country between Nicol Bay and the Fitzroy River, describing it as "an excellent anchorage and perfectly landlocked". He named it Port Hedland after the master of Mystery. Ridley located a firm landing place above the mangroves, and a practicable stockroute from there to the De Grey River.

In 1866, the Government Resident at Roebourne, Robert John Sholl, directed Charles Wedge to re-examine Port Hedland as an alternative port, because the distance from Tien Tsin Harbour (later known as Cossack) was discouraging settlement in areas such as the De Grey River. Wedge encountered difficulties in his efforts, as he was hampered by heavy rain and the tidal creeks around Mangrove Harbour and was unable to reach the proposed port site to survey its suitability.

In 1891, exploration of the area by Tom Traine, John Wedge (son of Charles Wedge) and Syd Hedley identified two landings and described the harbour as "pretty as well as safe". In September 1895, Cossack residents requested the District Surveyor survey the headland at Port Hedland in order to establish a town and requested that the Government build a jetty.

In 1896, the Port Hedland town site was surveyed by government surveyor E.W. Geyer, who named the grid of streets after the pastoral pioneers, including Richardson, Withnell, Wedge and McKay streets, and in October 1896, the town site was gazetted.

By 1905, the Roads Board had made considerable improvements to the roads and streets. In 1909 port facilities were built, and in 1911 a rail link to Marble Bar commenced operation.

On 30 July 1942 the town was bombed by the Japanese, killing one soldier at the local airfield.

By 1946, approximately 150 people lived in the area.

The population of the town in 1968 was about 3,000 people.

=== Mining ===
Goldsworthy Mining developed an iron ore mine approximately 100 kilometres east of Port Hedland in the early 1960s and built the towns of Goldsworthy and later Shay Gap as mine sites. A rail line was then built to Port Hedland, where dredging was undertaken to deepen and widen the port's channel, and a wharf was built opposite the township of Port Hedland on Finucane Island. Shipment of ore began on 27 May 1966, when the Harvey S. Mudd sailed from Port Hedland to Japan with 24,900 tonnes of ore.

In 1967, iron ore was discovered at Mount Whaleback, and a mining venture was undertaken that included the establishment of a new town, Newman, 426 km of rail from the mine to the port and the development of processing equipment at both Newman and Port Hedland. In 1986, at a cost of $87 million, the existing channel was dredged to allow larger ships to enter the port. Prior to dredging, the port was only able to load vessels of less than 2,000 tonnes, but today it is able to accommodate ships over 250,000 tonnes.

In 2013, finance was being raised for yet another iron ore mine, railway and port, this time for the Roy Hill project. It requires a 344 km railway.

With the neighbouring ports of Port Walcott and Dampier, Port Hedland is one of three major iron ore exporting ports in the Pilbara region.

=== 1968 plane crash ===
On 31 December 1968, a Vickers Viscount operated by MacRobertson Miller Airlines crashed at nearby Indee Station. The plane had flown from Perth without incident until about 10 minutes before landing at Port Hedland. The aircraft suffered catastrophic failure of the spar in the right wing. The wing suddenly separated from the fuselage. All 26 on board, including both pilots and two flight attendants, were killed.

=== Immigration detention facility ===
In 1991, an immigration detention facility, the Port Hedland Immigration Reception and Processing Centre, was opened to deal with the arrival of boat people seeking asylum. Port Hedland was seen as a good location, as it is in an area where many asylum seekers arriving by boat were entering Australia, and it had an international airport that would allow for easy deportations when required. The detention centre, situated on the beach front, was formerly a single-men's quarters for Mount Newman Mining Co. The centre was privatised by the first Howard Ministry in the late 1990s. It was closed in 2004 due to the falling number of asylum seekers arriving by boat in Australia's north-west. The town mayor called for the federal government to allow the town to use the detention centre to accommodate the many new mine workers needed for the town's mining boom. A lack of accommodation made it difficult for companies to operate efficiently, as they were unable to house staff or consultants within the town's small number of hotels. The centre is now operating as the Beachfront Village.

=== West End ===
In October 2019 the state government announced an Improvement Plan would be imposed over the West End of Port Hedland. The purpose of the plan was to prohibit all future residential development due to the health impacts caused by dust levels generated by Port activities.

=== Cyclones ===
On 13 April 2023 Cyclone Ilsa, a large and destructive category 5 tropical cyclone, made landfall just east of the port city.

In January 2025, the port was closed by its operator Pilbara Ports Authority due to a tropical cyclone threat.

== Climate ==
Port Hedland has a hot desert climate (Köppen BWh) although subject to the influence of tropical cyclones. Port Hedland is very warm to sweltering all year round, with mean maximum temperatures of 36.8 °C (98.2 °F) in March and 27.2 °C (81.0 °F) in July. Maximum temperatures in summer are usually moderated by a warm but humid sea breeze. Port Hedland is very sunny, averaging over 10 hours of sunshine per day annually and being in the sunniest region of Australia, receiving around 218.9 clear days annually. Dewpoint in the warmer months typically ranges from 19 to 22 °C (66.2 to 71.6 °F).

Annual rainfall (falling almost exclusively between December and June) averages 311.5 mm (12.26 in) but because of erratic cyclones is subject to some of the largest variations in annual precipitation in the world. As an illustration, in 1942, 1,040 millimetres or 40.94 inches fell, but two years later in 1944 only 32 millimetres or 1.26 inches fell and the town went for over 300 days with no rain. The town received record daily rainfall on 27 January 1967 when a total of 387.1 millimetres or 15.24 inches of rainfall was recorded for 24 hours, which is more than the mean annual rainfall. The high summer temperatures experienced in Port Hedland mean that most tourists to the area choose to visit in the cooler months between May and September.

According to the Bureau of Meteorology, the Western Pilbara, including Port Hedland is the sunniest place in Australia; being the only place to record an annual average of more than 10 hours a day of sunshine.

Climate data for Port Hedland (Port Hedland Airport 1942–2019); extremes 1948–present
Month	Jan	Feb	Mar	Apr	May	Jun	Jul	Aug	Sep	Oct	Nov	Dec	Year
Record high °C (°F)	49.0 (120.2)	48.2 (118.8)	47.0 (116.6)	42.8 (109.0)	38.8 (101.8)	35.5 (95.9)	34.4 (93.9)	39.9 (103.8)	42.3 (108.1)	46.9 (116.4)	47.4 (117.3)	47.9 (118.2)	49.0 (120.2)
Mean daily maximum °C (°F)	36.4 (97.5)	36.3 (97.3)	36.8 (98.2)	35.2 (95.4)	30.6 (87.1)	27.6 (81.7)	27.2 (81.0)	29.2 (84.6)	32.3 (90.1)	35.0 (95.0)	36.3 (97.3)	36.6 (97.9)	33.3 (91.9)
Daily mean °C (°F)	31.0 (87.8)	30.9 (87.6)	30.7 (87.3)	28.4 (83.1)	24.0 (75.2)	20.9 (69.6)	19.8 (67.6)	21.2 (70.2)	23.9 (75.0)	26.8 (80.2)	28.9 (84.0)	30.4 (86.7)	26.4 (79.5)
Mean daily minimum °C (°F)	25.6 (78.1)	25.5 (77.9)	24.6 (76.3)	21.5 (70.7)	17.3 (63.1)	14.2 (57.6)	12.4 (54.3)	13.2 (55.8)	15.4 (59.7)	18.6 (65.5)	21.4 (70.5)	24.1 (75.4)	19.5 (67.1)
Record low °C (°F)	18.1 (64.6)	16.3 (61.3)	15.8 (60.4)	12.2 (54.0)	7.0 (44.6)	4.7 (40.5)	3.2 (37.8)	3.7 (38.7)	7.7 (45.9)	11.1 (52.0)	12.4 (54.3)	16.6 (61.9)	3.2 (37.8)
Average rainfall mm (inches)	62.8 (2.47)	91.3 (3.59)	47.8 (1.88)	21.9 (0.86)	27.7 (1.09)	23.5 (0.93)	11.0 (0.43)	4.8 (0.19)	1.2 (0.05)	1.0 (0.04)	2.5 (0.10)	19.0 (0.75)	314.5 (12.38)
Average rainy days (≥ 0.2 mm)	5.1	7.1	4.4	1.9	3.3	3.1	2.1	1.2	0.9	0.8	0.6	1.8	32.3
Average afternoon relative humidity (%)	51	53	45	37	36	35	32	31	31	35	39	45	39
Mean monthly sunshine hours	315	260	290	285	280	255	295	320	320	340	340	330	3,630
Mean daily sunshine hours	10.2	9.2	9.3	9.5	9.3	8.5	9.4	10.3	10.5	11.0	11.3	10.6	9.9
Source: Bureau of Meteorology

Climate data for Port Hedland/Pardoo (Pardoo Airport 1985–2015)
Month	Jan	Feb	Mar	Apr	May	Jun	Jul	Aug	Sep	Oct	Nov	Dec	Year
Average dew point °C (°F)	23 (73)	23 (73)	21 (70)	17 (63)	11 (52)	9 (48)	7 (45)	7 (45)	11 (52)	15 (59)	17 (63)	21 (70)	15 (59)
Source: Time and Date

== Economy ==
Iron ore mines in the Pilbara region.

Port Hedland has a natural deep anchorage harbour which, as well as being the main fuel and container receival point for the region, was seen as perfect for shipment of the iron ore being mined in the ranges located inland from the town. The ore is moved by railway from four major iron ore deposits to the east and south of the Port Hedland area. The port exported 519,408,000 tonnes (1.1 trillion pounds) of iron ore (2017–2018). Other major resource activities supported by the town include the offshore natural gas fields, salt, manganese, and livestock. Major deposits of lithium are being developed and exploited south of the town as well. Grazing of cattle and sheep was formerly a major revenue earner for the region, but this has slowly declined. Port Hedland was also formerly the terminus for the WAGR Marble Bar Railway, which serviced the gold mining area of Marble Bar from July 1911 until closure on 31 October 1951. The locomotive from the Port Hedland to Marble Bar rail service is now preserved at the Kalamunda Historical Village in the south of the state. Located between Port Hedland and South Hedland are the large salt hills of Dampier Salt, a subsidiary of Rio Tinto. These large mounds have almost become a tourist attraction in their own right.

== Infrastructure ==
=== Harbour ===
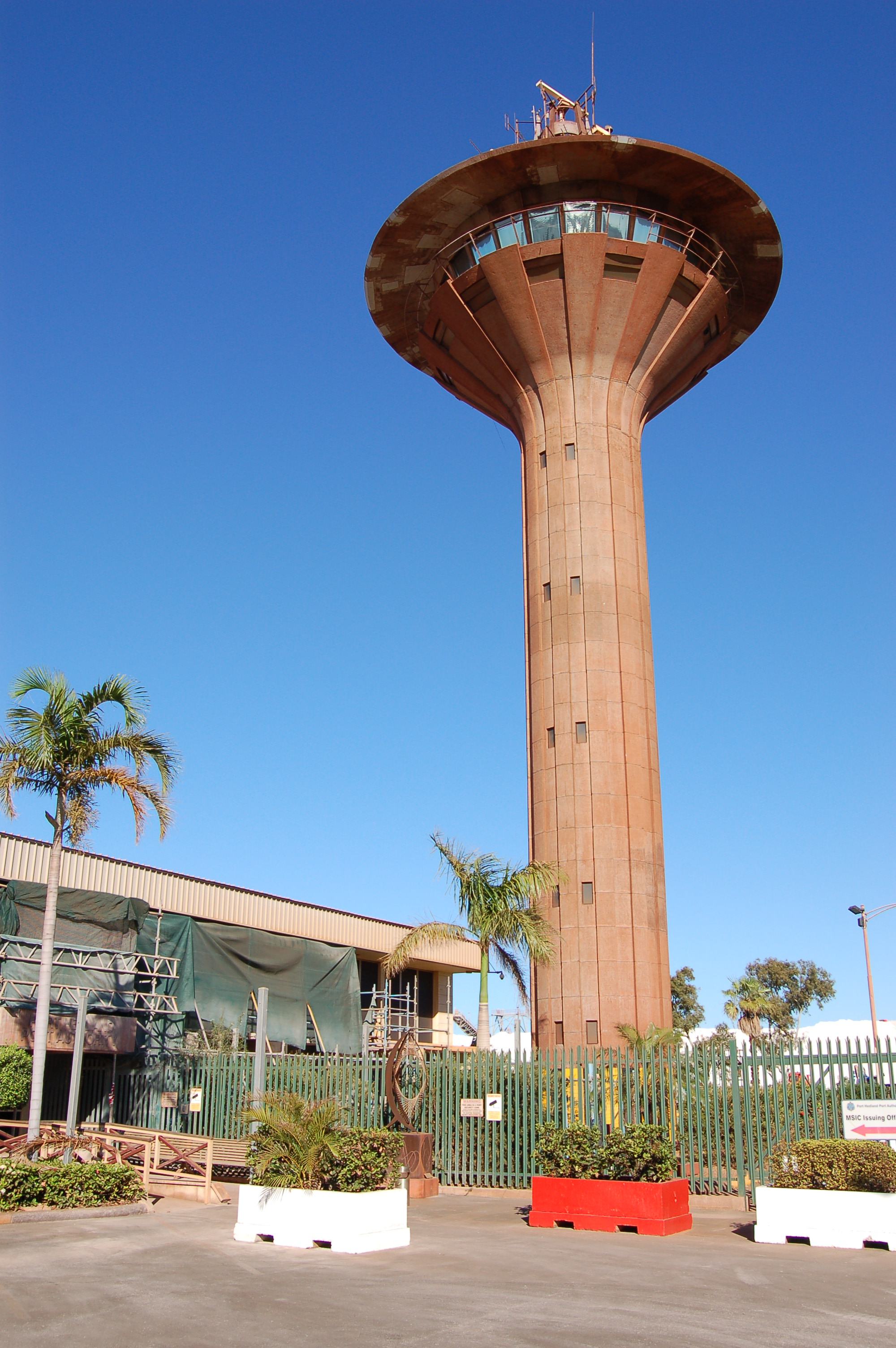
Geoff Monks Port Control Tower (1970–2019)

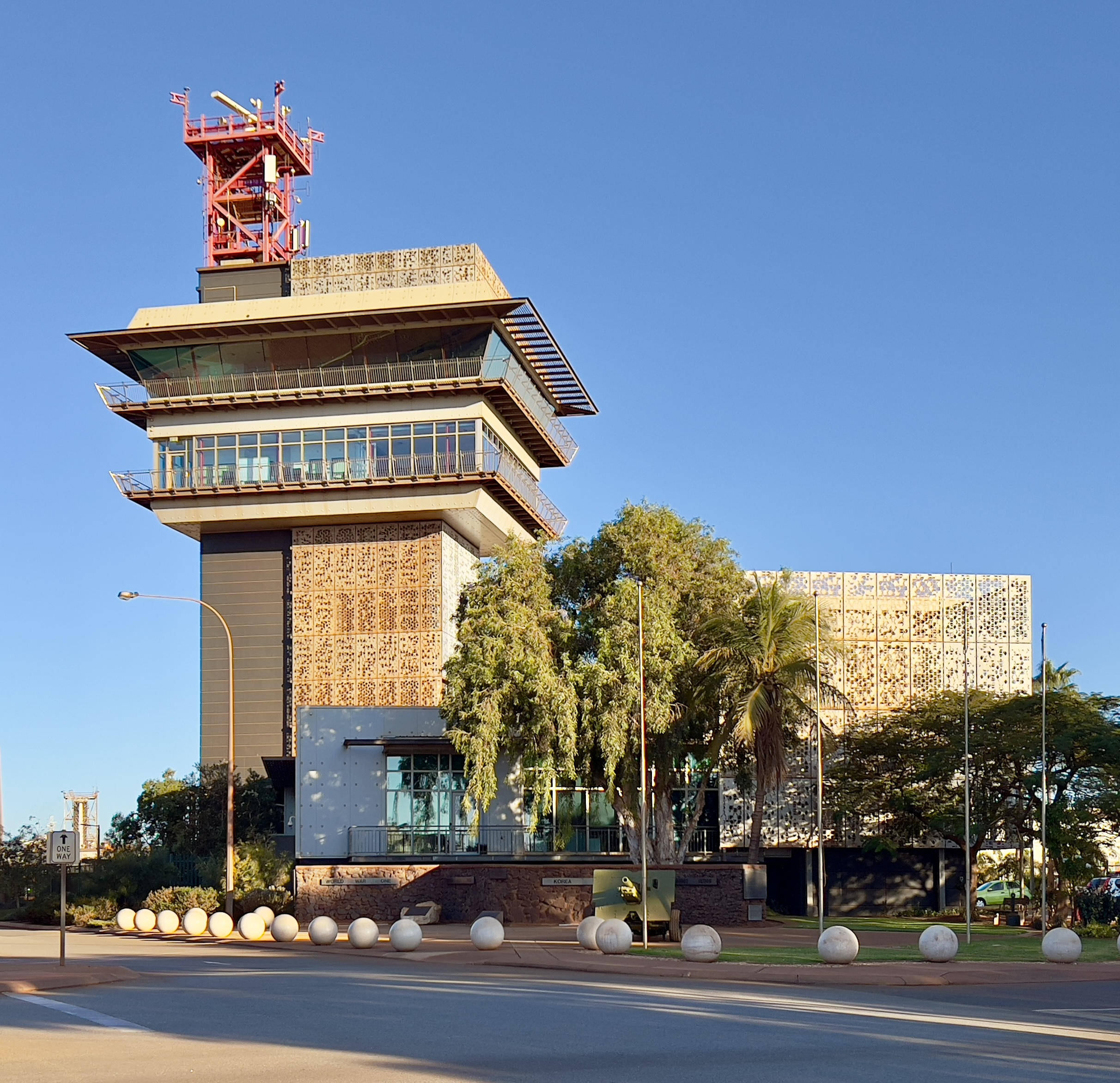
Hedland Tower Integrated Marine Operations Centre (opened 2019)

Hedland control towers

Port Hedland's harbour is managed by the Pilbara Ports Authority, a state government instrumentality. The Port Authority's headquarters, control tower and heliport are at Mangrove Point, just to the west of The Esplanade at the western end of Port Hedland. The tugboat pen, customs office and public jetty are at nearby Laurentius Point.

The harbour's wharves are located on both sides of the harbour: Finucane Island to the west and Port Hedland to the east. Access by oceangoing vessels into and out of the harbour is via a narrow curved channel.

The current control tower was opened in 2019.

=== Airport ===
Port Hedland is served by Port Hedland International Airport, located 5 nautical miles (9.3 km; 5.8 mi) south-east of Port Hedland and 11 km (6.8 mi) from South Hedland.

=== Education ===
The area contains five primary schools (four government, one Catholic), along with Hedland Senior High School, Port Hedland School of the Air and the Cassia Education Support Centre.

== Fauna and flora ==
Port Hedland has a flatback sea turtle rookery, located on the main beach front. Several lookouts along the beach front path allow views of marine mammals including Indo-Pacific bottlenose dolphins, Indo-Pacific humpbacked dolphins and Australian snubfin dolphins.

The Port Hedland Saltworks Important Bird Area is a 103 km^{2} tract of originally intertidal land, now containing a saltern, about 20 km east of the port of Port Hedland. The site regularly supports over 1% of the world populations of red-necked stints and sharp-tailed sandpipers, as well as a population of the range-restricted dusky gerygone. Species that have strongly declined since the 1980s are broad-billed sandpipers, Asian dowitchers, curlew sandpipers, red-necked avocets, banded stilts, Oriental plovers, Oriental pratincoles and white-winged black terns. Other species present include Australian bustards, bush stone-curlews, western bowerbirds, painted finches and canary white-eyes.

Estuaries such as Pretty Pool support mangroves, marine fish, and birds.

== Environmental issues ==
Pollution from iron ore dust regularly exceeds national standards. The local hospitalisation rate for respiratory infections is 30% higher than the Western Australian average.

== Blackrock Stakes ==
The Blackrock Stakes was a 122 km race from Goldsworthy to Port Hedland in which competitors, either in teams or as individuals, push wheelbarrows weighed down with iron ore. It was first run in 1971, and competitors pushed a wheelbarrow full of iron ore from a remote mine site into Port Hedland. After that the race grew to raise more than $1 million for charity as a modified version where teams of 10, trios, duos and lone runners pushed modified wheelbarrows containing 11 kg of iron ore over the distance. The last race was run in 2010, as the growth in mining made the route too dangerous.

== See also ==
- Don Rhodes Mining and Transport Museum
- Pilbara historical timeline
- Pilbara newspapers
- Port Hedland International Airport
- Port Hedland Saltworks Important Bird Area
- Silver Star Cafe (Port Hedland)
