= Wanstead (1826 ship) =

History

United Kingdom
- Name: Wanstead
- Namesake: Wanstead
- Builder: Saint John, New Brunswick
- Launched: 1826
- Fate: Foundered 27 September 1843

General characteristics
- Tons burthen: 360, or 363 (bm)
- Length: 105 ft (32.0 m)

Wanstead was launched in 1826 at St John, New Brunswick. From 1826 on she sailed from England, first as a West Indiaman. She made two voyages transporting passengers to Tasmania, one voyage in 1827–28, and the other in 1829–30, stopping at the Swan River Colony. Between 1831 and 1837 she made one voyage as a whaler, catching whales off Japan, and New Zealand. She then returned to trading with the West Indies. Her crew abandoned her at sea in September 1843.

== Career ==
Wanstead first appeared in Lloyd's Register (LR) in 1826, Wanstead, Plunkett, master, arrived at Gravesend from Saint John, New Brunswick, on 8 October 1826.

Year	Master	Owner	Trade	Source & notes
1826	Lacy	Gale & Son	London–Jamaica	LR
1827	Lacy; Langdon	Gale & Son	London–Jamaica	LR
1828	Langdon	Gale & Son	London–New South Wales	LR

Wanstead, Langdon, master, sailed for Van Diemen's Land on 30 December 1827 and arrived at Hobart on 18/20 May 1828 with 23 passengers on board.

Then Wanstead Matthew Curling Friend, master, left London on 14 August 1829. She arrived at the Swan River Colony on 30 January 1830. She sailed for Hobart on 19 March and arrived at Hobart on 11/14 April 1830 with 44 passengers and four prisoners on board.

Year	Master	Owner	Trade	Source & notes
1831	Friend; M'Culliff	Gale & Son	London-Swan River Colony	LR
1832	M'Culliff	Gale & Son	London-South Seas	LR

Captain McAuliff sailed from London on 16 October 1831, bound for the whaling grounds off Japan. She arrived at Sydney on 5 September 1833. There she transhipped 1300 barrels of oil, leaving Sydney clean after affecting repairs. On 29 December 1834 she returned to Sydney to procure fresh food as the crew was suffering from scurvy. She returned to England on 24 April 1837.

Year	Master	Owner	Trade	Source & notes
1838		Gale & Co.	London–West Indies	LR; small repairs 1837
1839	Fawkener	Gale & Co.	London–West Indies	LR; small repairs 1837

James Gale & Son offered Wanstead for sale by auction on 17 June 1842.

Year	Master	Owner	Trade	Source & notes
1842	Fawkener; Moodie	Gale & Co. Mustart	London–West Indies; London	LR; small repairs 1837
1843	Moodie	Mustart	London	LR; small repairs 1837 & 1842

== Fate ==
Her crew abandoned Wanstead, Moodie, master, at 46°00′N 55°30′E on 27 September 1843 in the Atlantic Ocean. Apollo, of Dundee, Walker, master, rescued the master and crew and brought them into Quebec. The LR volume for 1843 carried the annotation "LOST" by her name.
