= Shire of Marble Bar =

The Shire of Marble Bar was a local government area in the Pilbara region of Western Australia. It was established as the Bamboo Road District on 4 September 1896, and was based in the now-former town of Bamboo Creek. The first election was held in January 1897.

It was renamed the Marble Bar Road District on 28 March 1904, after which the board seat moved to Marble Bar.

It was declared a shire and named the Shire of Marble Bar with effect from 1 July 1961 following the passage of the Local Government Act 1960, which reformed all remaining road districts into shires.

The shire ceased to exist on 27 May 1972, when it amalgamated with the Shire of Nullagine to form the Shire of East Pilbara.

Senator and Liberal Party powerbroker Noel Crichton-Browne and state parliamentarians George Miles and Arthur Bickerton served on the board before their respective elections to parliament, with Miles serving as road board chairman and Crichton-Browne as shire president.
