= Edward Davy Wedge =

Edward Davy Wedge (1777–1852), brother of John Helder Wedge, became a colonist in Van Diemen's Land and the Port Phillip District of Australia.

The Wedges imported sheep and a saw mill into the Van Diemen's Land colony. Mr Wedge obtained a 2,000 acre (8 km²) grant, which he called Forton, but at first he tried to establish the saw mill at Oyster Cove, just south of Hobart Town. The mill was not a success financially, and was eventually abandoned at a loss of £2,000. He then turned to agricultural pursuits, and established Forton with the assistance of convict labour.

After the settlement of Port Phillip in 1835, he and his brother John established a squatters run at Werribee, near Melbourne, and in the 1840s Davy and his wife left Forton for the Werribee run.

In May 1852 the Werribee River flooded and the Wedge house was engulfed. The family was forced onto the roof, which collapsed during the night, and the family was washed away. Davy and his wife Lucy both died, as did their eldest daughter, Lucy. Davy, his wife and daughter Lucy were all buried at the Williamstown Cemetery.
