= South Hedland, Western Australia =

South Hedland
- Suburb
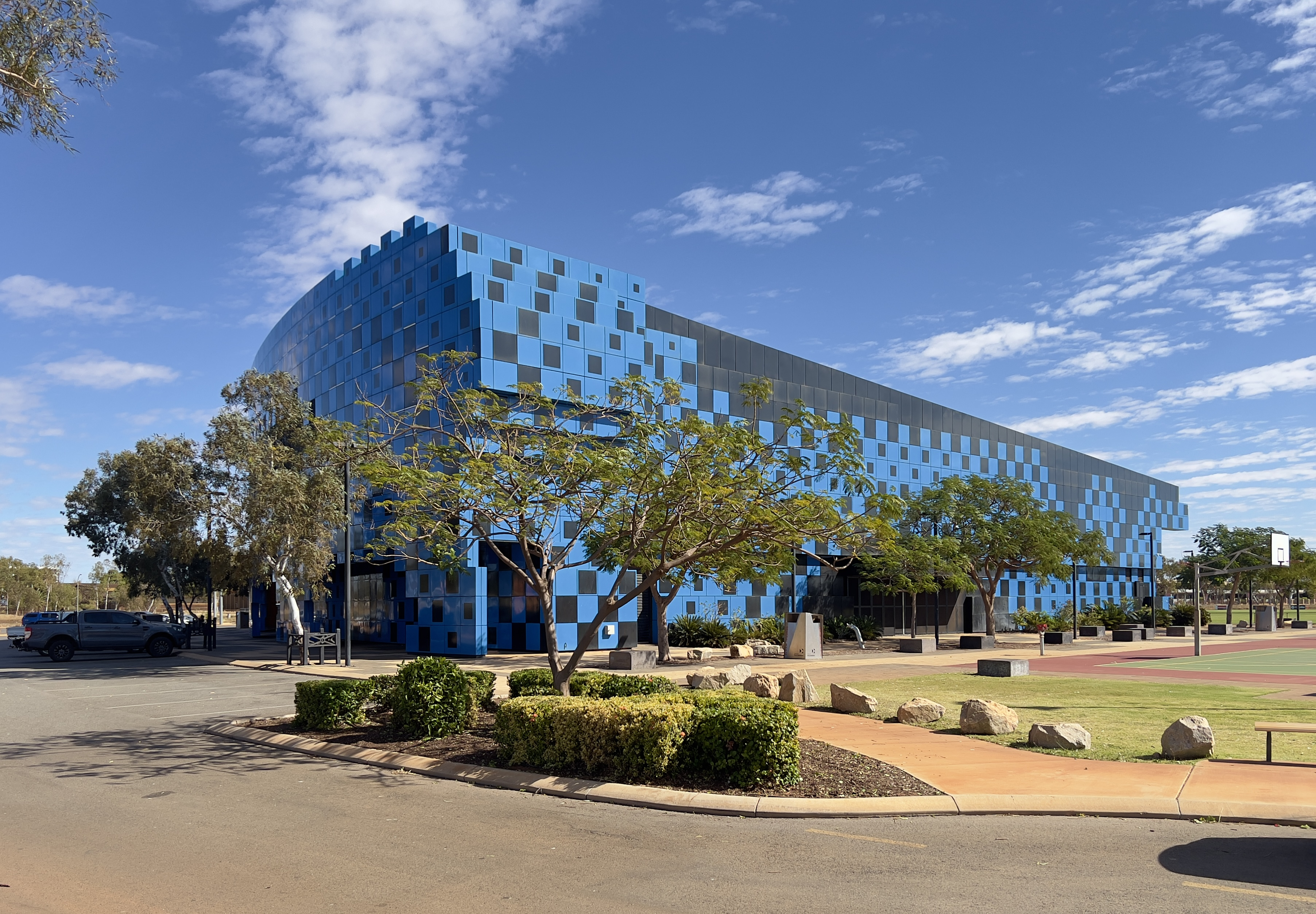
- Wanangkura Stadium in South Hedland in July 2023

- Interactive map of South Hedland
- Coordinates: 20°24′00″S 118°37′00″E
- Country: Australia
- State: Western Australia
- City: Port Hedland
- LGA: Town of Port Hedland
- Location: 1,313 km (816 mi) from Perth; 18 km (11 mi) from Port Hedland
- Established: 1970s

Government
  - State electorate: Pilbara
  - Federal division: Durack

Area
  - Total: 22.3 km^{2} (8.6 sq mi)
- Elevation: 7 m (23 ft)

Population
  - Total: 11,046 (SAL 2021)
- Postcode: 6722
- Mean max temp: 33.2 °C (91.8 °F)
- Mean min temp: 19.3 °C (66.7 °F)
- Annual rainfall: 313.5 mm (12.34 in)

South Hedland (or Port Hedland City Centre) is a suburb of the Town of Port Hedland, in the Pilbara region in north-western Western Australia. It is the CBD of the Town of Port Hedland and is the Port Hedland Town Centre. It can be reached by the North West Coastal Highway and Great Northern Highway. It contains Hedland Senior High School.

== History ==
The Commonwealth Government's 1960 decision to lift an embargo on iron ore exports led to the rapid expansion of mining in the Pilbara and the creation of several new towns, including South Hedland.

The original design of the South Hedland townsite was inspired by the Radburn principles. Four residential neighbourhoods were to cluster around a commercial core connected by parkways and pedestrian connections. Following the completion of the first neighbourhood the design was considered a failure by residents and government authorities and abandoned in 1974, although it has continued to shape the overall town layout to the present day.
