= Apollo (1819 ship) =

History

United Kingdom
- Name: Apollo
- Namesake: Apollo
- Builder: Hilhouse, Bristol
- Launched: 1819
- Fate: Abandoned 24 September 1846

General characteristics
- Tons burthen: Old Act:248, or 254, or 25447/94 (bm); New Act (post 1836):276 (bm)
- Length: 96 ft 8 in (29.5 m)
- Beam: 24 ft 5 in (7.4 m)

Apollo was launched in Bristol in 1819 as a West Indiaman. New owners in 1838 shifted her homeport to Dundee; she then sailed between Dundee and Montreal. In September 1843 she rescued the crew of a vessel that had foundered. In September 1846 a hurricane so damaged her that the crew and passengers abandoned her. Two passing schooners rescued them.

== Career ==
Apollo first appeared in Lloyd's Register (LR) in 1820.

Year	Master	Owner	Trade	Source & notes
1820	George Mereweather	A. Hunt	Bristol–Dominica	LR
1824	Mereweather; J.Curtis	A.Hunt; Davidson	Bristol–Antigua	LR
1826	R.Blyth	Davidson	London–Berbice	LR
1829	R.Blyth; Kendall	Davidson	London–Berbice	LR
1836	W.Rayner; Jack	Davidson; Willis & Co.	London–Danzig	LR
1838	H.Walker	[David] Crighton	Dundee–Montreal	LR; small repairs 1838

In 1838 new owners moved Apollo's homeport and registry to Dundee.

Year	Master	Owner	Trade	Source & notes
1843	H.Walker	Crighton	Dundee–Montreal	LR; small repairs 1840 & 1843

Her crew abandoned Wanstead at 46°00′N 55°30′E on 27 September 1843 in the Atlantic Ocean. Apollo, of Dundee, Walker, master, rescued the master and crew and brought them into Quebec.

Year	Master	Owner	Trade	Source & notes
1846	H.Walker	Crighton	Dundee–Montreal	LR; small repairs 1840 & 1843

== Fate ==
Apollo was on a voyage from Dundee to Montreal when a gale on 19 September 1846 in the Atlantic Ocean (45°51′N 35°18′W) turned into a hurricane that washed a boy overboard and so damaged her that she was in danger of foundering. On 24 September the schooners Victoria and Paragon rescued the passengers and crew; Victoria took 23 to Waterford and Paragon took the rest. LR for 1846 carried the annotation "Abandoned" by her name.

Her hulk was reportedly last sighted on 12 December at 29°N 20°W. However, this may have been the wreck of another Apollo that was lost in December.
