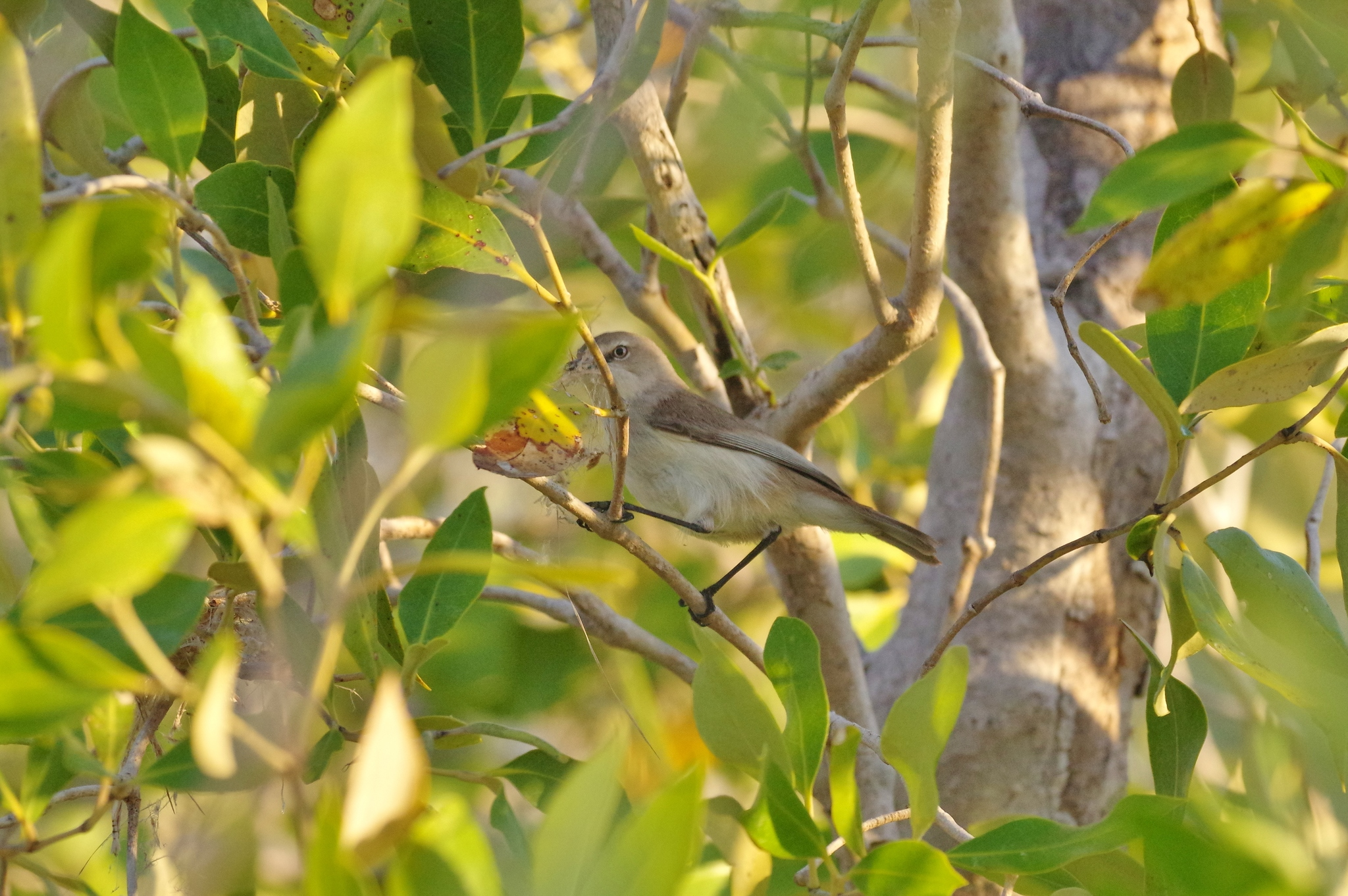

Conservation status
- Least Concern (IUCN 3.1)

Scientific classification
- Kingdom: Animalia
- Phylum: Chordata
- Class: Aves
- Order: Passeriformes
- Family: Acanthizidae
- Genus: Gerygone
- Species: G. tenebrosa

Binomial name
- Gerygone tenebrosa (R. Hall, 1901)

Subspecies
- G. t. tenebrosa - (Hall, R, 1901); G. t. christophori - Mathews, 1912

Synonyms
- Pseudogerygone tenebrosa (protonym)

= Dusky gerygone =

Species of bird

The dusky gerygone (Gerygone tenebrosa) is a species of bird in the family Acanthizidae. It is endemic to coastal central and northern areas of Western Australia, from Shark Bay to Kunmuya.

Its natural habitat is subtropical or tropical mangrove forests.

== Description ==
The dusky gerygone is about 10-13 cm in length, with the upper parts grey-brown and tinged olive. The underparts are a greyish white, legs and beak are black.
