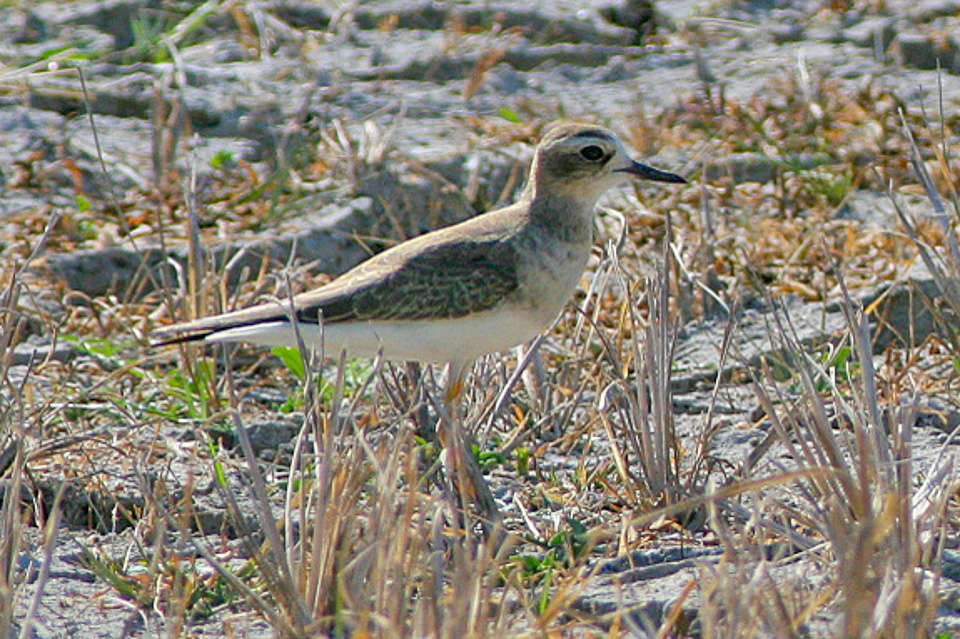

Conservation status
- Least Concern (IUCN 3.1)

Scientific classification
- Kingdom: Animalia
- Phylum: Chordata
- Class: Aves
- Order: Charadriiformes
- Family: Charadriidae
- Genus: Anarhynchus
- Species: A. veredus

Binomial name
- Anarhynchus veredus (Gould, 1848)

Synonyms
- Charadrius veredus (protonym)

= Oriental plover =

Species of bird

The oriental plover (Anarhynchus veredus), also known as the oriental dotterel, is a medium-sized plover closely related to the Caspian plover. It breeds in parts of Mongolia and China, migrating southwards each year to spend its non-breeding season in Indonesia, New Guinea and northern Australia.

== Description ==
Adult male in breeding plumage: white face, throat and fore-crown; grey-brown hind-crown, hind-neck and back; belly white, demarcated with narrow black band and then broad chestnut breast band merging into white throat. Female, juvenile and non-breeding male: generally grey-brown upperparts and white belly; pale face with white streak above eye. Measurements: length 21–25 cm; wingspan 46–53 cm; weight 95 g. Among the red-breasted Charadrius plovers, this bird is relatively large, long-legged and long-winged.

== Distribution and habitat ==
Breeds in Mongolia, eastern Russia and Manchuria; migrates through eastern China and South-East Asia to Indonesia and northern Australia. Rare in New Guinea; straggler to New Zealand and Europe four times (Finland, Norway, Sweden and the Netherlands). The oriental plover breeds in dry steppes, deserts, arid grasslands and saltpans. Its non-breeding habitat includes grasslands, salt-fields and coastal areas.

== Food ==
The oriental plover feeds mainly on insects.

== Breeding ==
The breeding of this bird has not been much studied but it nests on the ground.

== Conservation ==
About 90% of the oriental plovers that make the long journey south overwinter in Australia and it has been estimated that there may be 160,000 individuals of this species. With a large range and no evidence of significant population decline, this species' conservation status is rated by the IUCN as being of Least Concern.
