= List of Aboriginal communities in Western Australia =

Aboriginal communities in Western Australia are built communities for indigenous Australians within their ancestral country; the communities comprise families with continuous links to country that extend before the European settlement of Australia.

== A ==
- Ardyaloon

== B ==
- Badjaling Community
- Balgo
- Balginjirr community
- Barrel Well Community
- Bayulu Community
- Beagle Bay Community
- Bell Springs Community
- Bidan Community
- Bidyadanga Community
- Bilinue Community
- Bilgungurr Community
- Bindi Bindi Community
- Blackstone see Papulankutja
- Bobieding Community
- Bondini community
- Brunbrunganjal Community
- Burringurrah Community
- Buttah Windee Community

== C ==
- Cheeditha Community
- Coonana
- Cosmo Newbery
- Cotton Creek Community
- Crocodile Hole Community
- Cundeelee

== D ==
- Djarindjin Community
- Djugerari Community

== F ==
- Four Mile Community
- Frazier Downs Community

== G ==
- Ganinyi Community
- Gidgee Gully Community
- Gilaroong Community
- Girriyoowa Community
- Gooda Binya Community
- Goolarabooloo Millibinyarri Community
- Guda Guda Community
- Gulgagulganeng community

== I ==
- Ilkulka Community
- Imintji Community
- Innawonga Community
- Iragul Community
- Irrungadji Community

== J ==
- Jameson Community
- Jarlmadangah Burru Community
- Jigalong Community
- Jimbalakudunj Community
- Jimbilum Community
- Joy Springs Community
- Jundaru community
- Junjuwa community

== K ==
- Kadjina Community
- Kalumburu
- Kandiwal community
- Karalundi Community
- Karnparri community
- Kearney Range Community
- Kiwirrkurra Community
- Koorabye community
- Kunawaritji Community
- Kundat Djaru Community
- Kupartiya Community
- Kupungarri Community
- Kurnangki community
- Kurrawang community
- Kutkabubba Community

== L ==
- Lamboo Gunian Community
- Lombadina
- Looma Community
- Lundja community

== M ==
- Madunka Ewurry Community
- Mallingbar community
- Mandangala Community
- Mantamaru Community
- Marribank Community
- Marta Marta Community
- Marunbabidi Community
- Mindibungu Community
- Mingullatharndo Community
- Mingalkala Community
- Mirima community
- Moongardie Community
- Morrell Park community
- Mount Margaret Aboriginal Community
- Mowanjum Community
- Mowla Bluff Community
- Mud Springs Community
- Mulan Community
- Mulga Queen Community
- Muludja Community
- Mungullah Community
- Munthamar Community

== N ==
- Nambi Village Community
- Neem Community
- Ngalingkadji Community
- Ngallagunda Community
- Ngumpan Community
- Ngunulum Community
- Ngurrawaana Community
- Ngurtuwarta Community
- Nicholson Block Community
- Ninga Mia Village Community
- Noonkanbah Community
- Nygah Nygah Community

== O ==
- Oombulgurri Community

== P ==
- Pandanus Park Community
- Papulankutja Community
- Parnngurr Community
- Parnpajinya community
- Patjarr Community
- Pia Wadjari Community
- Punmu Community
- Punju Njamal Community

== R ==
- Rollah Community

== S ==
- Shire of Ngaanyatjarraku
- Swan Valley Nyungah Community

== T ==
- Tjirrkarli Community
- Tjukurla Community
- Tjuntjunjtarra Community
- Tkalka Boorda Community

== W ==
- Wakathuni Community
- Wanamulnyndong Community
- Wanarn Community
- Wandanooka community
- Wangkatjungka Community
- Warakurna Community
- Warburton
- Warmun Community
- Warralong Community
- Warrayu community
- Weymul Community
- Wijilawarrim Community
- Wingellina
- Wollergerberleng Community
- Wongatha Wonganarra Community
- Woodstock Homestead Community
- Woolah Community
- Wuggubun Community
- Wungo Community
- Wurrenranginy Community

== Y ==
- Yakanarra Community
- Yandarinya Community
- Yandeyarra Community
- Yarrunga Community
- Yirrallelm Community
- Yiyili Community
- Youngaleena Community
- Yulga Jinna Community
- Yungngora Community
