= Gillarong =

Community in Western Australia

Gilaroong
- Coordinates: 18.3074°S 125.595°E
- Country: Australia
- State: Western Australia
- LGA: Shire of Derby-West Kimberley
- Location: 15 km (9.3 mi) south of Fitzroy Crossing, Western Australia

Government
  - State electorate: Kimberley
  - Federal division: Durack
- Elevation: 114 m (374 ft)
- Postcode: 6765
- Mean max temp: 35.96 °C (96.73 °F)
- Mean min temp: 19.1 °C (66.4 °F)
- Annual rainfall: 541.2 mm (21.31 in)

Gillarong (also spelt Gilaroong) is a small Aboriginal community, located adjacent to the Bayulu Community approximately 15 kilometres (9 mi) south east of Fitzroy Crossing in the Kimberley region of Western Australia, within the Shire of Derby-West Kimberley.

== Native title ==
The community is located within the registered area of the Gooniyandi Combined #2 (WAD6008/2000) native title claim.

== Governance ==
The community is managed through its incorporated body, Gilaroong Aboriginal Corporation, incorporated under the Aboriginal Councils and Associations Act 1976 on 28 February 1989.

== Town planning ==
Gillarong does not have its own Layout Plan, but comes under the Bayulu Layout Plan No.1, which includes Gillarong and Karnparni. This has been prepared in accordance with State Planning Policy 3.2 Aboriginal Settlements, and was endorsed by the Gillarong community on 19 May 2011 and by the Western Australian Planning Commission on 9 October 2012.
