= Moongardie Community =

Community in Western Australia

Coordinates: 18°46′53″S 126°26′53″E

Moongardie Western Australia
- Postcode(s): 6770
- Elevation: 422 m (1,385 ft)
- Location: 110 km (68 mi) west of Halls Creek, Western Australia
- LGA(s): Shire of Halls Creek
- State electorate(s): Kimberley
- Federal division(s): Durack
Mean max temp	Mean min temp	Annual rainfall
33.6 °C; 92 °F	20.0 °C; 68 °F	557.4 mm 21.9 in

Moongardie is a small Aboriginal community, located 110 kilometres (68 mi) east of Halls Creek in the Kimberley region of Western Australia, within the Shire of Halls Creek.

== Native title ==
The community is located within the registered Gooniyandi Combined 2 (WAD6008/00) native title claim area.

== Education ==
Children of school age at Moongardie attend the Yiyili Community School. The school caters for students in kindergarten to Year 10 from Yiyili and the surrounding outstations of Ganinyi, Girriyoowa, Goolgaradah, Kurinyjarn, and Rocky Springs. In 2010 there were 72 students enrolled. A daily bus service operated by the school collects students from other nearby communities including Moongardie 30 kilometres (19 mi) distant. The school provides lunch for students. Students who progress beyond Year 10 attend boarding school in Darwin, Northern Territory, and other larger towns.

== Governance ==
The community is managed through its incorporated body, Moongardie Indigenous Corporation (formerly Moongardie Aboriginal Corporation), incorporated under the Aboriginal Councils and Associations Act 1976 on 11 February 1992.

== Moongardie ==
Moongardie Layout Plan No.1 was prepared in accordance with State Planning Policy 3.2 Aboriginal Settlements, and was endorsed by the community in 1999 and the Western Australian Planning Commission in 2001. The layout plan map-set and background report can be viewed at Planning Western Australia.
