= Lamboo Gunian Community =

Community in Western Australia

Lamboo Gunian Western Australia
- Coordinates: 18.338°S 127.537°E
- Postcode(s): 6770
- Elevation: 422 m (1,385 ft)
- Location: 20 km (12 mi) east of Halls Creek, Western Australia
- LGA(s): Shire of Halls Creek
- State electorate(s): Kimberley
- Federal division(s): Durack
Mean max temp	Mean min temp	Annual rainfall
33.6 °C; 92 °F	20.0 °C; 68 °F	557.4 mm 21.9 in

Lamboo Gunian (also referred to as Koongie Park) is a small Aboriginal community, located 20 kilometres (12 mi) east of Halls Creek in the Kimberley region of Western Australia, within the Shire of Halls Creek.

== Native title ==
The community is located within the registered Koongie Elvire (WAD6157/98) native title claim area.

== Governance ==
The community is managed through its incorporated body, Koongie Elvira Aboriginal Corporation (formally Lamboo Gunian Aboriginal Corporation), incorporated under the Aboriginal Councils and Associations Act 1976 on 2 June 1980.

== Town planning ==
Lamboo Gunian Layout Plan No.2 has been prepared in accordance with State Planning Policy 3.2 Aboriginal Settlements. Layout Plan No.2 was endorsed by the community on 17 December 2002 and the Western Australian Planning Commission on 9 September 2003. The layout plan map-set and background report can be viewed at Planning Western Australia's website.
