= Girriyoowa (Pullout Springs) =

Community in Western Australia

- Coordinates: 18.72°S 126.768°E
- Country: Australia
- State: Western Australia
- LGA: Shire of Halls Creek
- Location: 110 km (68 mi) west of Halls Creek, Western Australia

Government
  - State electorate: Kimberley
  - Federal division: Durack
- Elevation: 422 m (1,385 ft)
- Postcode: 6770
- Mean max temp: 33.6 °C (92.5 °F)
- Mean min temp: 20.0 °C (68.0 °F)
- Annual rainfall: 557.4 mm (21.94 in)

Girriyoowa (also known as Pullout Springs) is a small Aboriginal community, located approximately 110 kilometres (68 mi) west of Halls Creek in the Kimberley region of Western Australia, within the Shire of Halls Creek.

== Native title ==
The community is located within the registered area of the Gooniyandi Combined #2 (WAD6008/2000) native title claim.

== Governance ==
The community is managed through its incorporated body, Marralgni (Granite Community) Indigenous Corporation.

Originally named, Girriyoowa Aboriginal Corporation, which was incorporated under the Aboriginal Councils and Associations Act 1976 on 2 May 1994, Grriyoowa Aboriginal Corporation officially changed its name to Marralgni (Granite Community) Indigenous Corporation on 15 May 2009.

== Education ==
Children of school age at Girriyoowa attend the Yiyili Community School. The school caters for students in kindergarten to Year 10 from Yiyili and the surrounding outstations of Ganinyi, Girriyoowa, Goolgaradah, Kurinyjarn, and Rocky Springs. In 2010 there were 72 students enrolled. A daily bus service operated by the school collects students from other nearby communities including Moongardie 30 km distant. The school provides lunch for students. Students who progress beyond Year 10 attend boarding school in Darwin and other larger towns.

== Town planning ==
Girriyoowa does not have its on Layout Plan, but comes under the Yiyili including Ganinyi, Girriyoowa and Kurinyjarn Layout Plan No.2. This was prepared in accordance with State Planning Policy 3.2 Aboriginal Settlements, and was endorsed by the Girriyoowa community on 2 December 2010, and by the Western Australian Planning Commission in on 29 September 2011.

The Layout Plan map-set and background report can be viewed at Planning Western Australia's web site.
