= Karnparnmi =

Community in Western Australia

Karnparnmi Western Australia
- Coordinates: 18.313841°0′S 125.617464°0′E
- Location: 13 km (8 mi) east of Fitzroy Crossing
- LGA(s): Shire of Derby–West Kimberley
- State electorate(s): Kimberley

Karnparnmi is a small Aboriginal community, located proximate to Fitzroy Crossing in the Kimberley region of Western Australia, within the Shire of Derby–West Kimberley. Karnparnmi is located adjacent the much larger Bayulu community.

Most community members were previously living at Bayulu. The first dwelling, which still remains at the centre of the community, was constructed around 1997. Community members are both Gooniyandi and Walmajarri people. Approximately seven adults plus children reside permanently at the community in six dwellings.

== Native title ==
The community is located within the registered Gooniyandi Combined 2 native title claim (WC2000/010) area.

== Town planning ==
Karnparnmi Layout Plan No.1 was prepared in 2009 in accordance with State Planning Policy 3.2 Aboriginal Settlements. The plan has not yet been endorsed by the community or Western Australian Planning Commission. The layout plan has been incorporated within the Bayulu plan which can be viewed at Planning Western Australia's website.
