= Imintji Community =

Community in Western Australia

Imintji
- Town
- Coordinates: 17°09′02″S 125°27′41″E
- Country: Australia
- State: Western Australia
- LGA: Shire of Derby-West Kimberley
- Location: 220 km (140 mi) east of Derby, Western Australia

Government
  - State electorate: Kimberley
  - Federal division: Durack
- Postcode: 6728

Imintji is a small Aboriginal community located 220 km from Derby in the Kimberley region of Western Australia, within the Shire of Derby-West Kimberley.

Imintji community is located on the Gibb River Road. The community reserve lies within the greater ancient Devonian limestone reef of the Wunaamin Miliwundi Ranges, and is located on the northern face and lower drainage flats of the smaller southern Precipice Range.

== Native title ==
The community is located within the Wanjina – Wunggurr Wilinggin (WAD6016/96) native title determination area.

== History ==
Imintji, meaning "the place to sit down" in the Ngarinyin language, was first proposed as a community settlement area in the 1950s. It became a central "tablelands" outstation made up of many family members working at the nearby Mount Hart, Mount House and Mount Barnett Stations. It also developed into an important stop-over place and roadhouse facility alongside the Gibb River Road in the 1960s.

The roadhouse closed in March 2015, then re-opened in May 2016.

== Governance ==
The community is managed through its incorporated body, Imintji Aboriginal Corporation, incorporated under the Aboriginal Councils and Associations Act 1976 on 13 April 1985.

== Town planning ==
Imintji Layout Plan No.1 has been prepared in accordance with State Planning Policy 3.2 Aboriginal Settlements. Layout Plan No.1 was endorsed by the community on 25 August 2008 and the Western Australian Planning Commission on 2 February 2010.
