= Guda Guda Community =

Community in Western Australia

Guda Guda Community Western Australia
- Coordinates: 15.536°S 128.192°E
- Population: 46 (2001 CHINS)
- Location: 10 km (6 mi) from Wyndham
- LGA(s): Shire of Wyndham-East Kimberley
- State electorate(s): Kimberley
- Federal division(s): Durack

Guda Guda is a small Aboriginal community, located on Great Northern Highway, in the Nine Mile Area of the Kimberley region township of Wyndham, Western Australia, approximately 10 kilometres south-east of the town centre.

== Background ==
The majority of people residing at Guda Guda have personal histories and affiliations at Forrest River Mission (Oombulgurri). During the wet season Guda Guda community is regularly visited by people from Oombulgurri, Halls Creek, One Arm Point and Lombadina.

== History ==
Guda Guda was initially a stopover on the droving track to Wyndham meatworks and Wyndham port. Cattle were mustered from Doon Doon Station, Bow River and Gibb River. Drovers came from Maple Downs, Gurranji, Lissadel station and Home Valley station to the Wyndham meatworks, which closed in 1989.

In the 1950s and 1960s people who are currently living at the Guda Guda community, used to live in the flat areas on the western side of the current community for a period of at least 20 years. Because of the long period of residence in this area people developed personal histories and affiliations in the region and chose the area where Guda Guda community is now located.

== Governance ==
The community is managed by the Guda Guda Aboriginal Community Inc, which represents the community's residents. The corporation is an incorporated body under the Commonwealth Incorporations and Associations Act.

== Native title ==
The community is located within the Balanggarra 3 native title determination (WCD2013/006) area and native title has been determined to exist on the community land.

== Town planning ==
Guda Guda Layout Plan No.1 was prepared in accordance with State Planning Policy 3.2 Aboriginal Settlements. Layout Plan No.1 was endorsed by the Western Australian Planning Commission on 15 April 2003. The Layout Plan map-set can be viewed at Planning Western Australia's website.

== See also ==
- List of reduplicated Australian place names
