= Kupungarri Community =

Community in Western Australia

Kupungarri Western Australia
- Coordinates: 16.715°S 125.918°E
- Population: 75 (2016)
- Postcode(s): 6728
- Location: 300 km (186 mi) NE of Derby, Western Australia
- LGA(s): Shire of Derby-West Kimberley
- State electorate(s): Kimberley
- Federal division(s): Durack

Kupungarri is a medium-sized Aboriginal community, located 300 km north east of Derby in the Kimberley region of Western Australia, within the Shire of Derby-West Kimberley. The community had a population of 75 residents at the time of the 2016 census.

== Native title ==
The community is located within the Wanjina – Wunggurr Wilinggin (WAD6016/96) native title determination area.

== Governance ==
The community is managed through its incorporated body, Kupungarri Community Aboriginal Corporation, incorporated under the Aboriginal Councils and Associations Act 1976 on 23 August 1985.

== Town planning ==
Kupungarri Layout Plan No.1 has been prepared in accordance with State Planning Policy 3.2 Aboriginal Settlements. Layout Plan No.1 was endorsed by the community on 14 May 2003 and the Western Australian Planning Commission on 16 March 2004. The Layout Plan map-set and background report are accessible online.
