= Djugerari (Cherrabun) =

Community in Western Australia

- Town
- Coordinates: 18°59′13″S 125°30′38″E
- Country: Australia
- State: Western Australia
- LGA: Shire of Derby-West Kimberley
- Location: 110 km (68 mi) south east of Fitzroy Crossing, Western Australia

Government
  - State electorate: Kimberley
  - Federal division: Durack
- Elevation: 211 m (692 ft)
- Postcode: 6765

Djugerari (also known as Cherrabun) is a small Aboriginal community located within the Shire of Derby-West Kimberley.

Djugerari is 110 km by road from Fitzroy Crossing. Access is via the Great Northern Highway (54 km) and then by the unsealed Cherrabun Road.

In the 2011 census, Djugerari had a total population of 83, including 77 Aboriginal and Torres Strait Islander people.

== History ==
Djugerari was established as a permanent Aboriginal community in the early 1980s by Walmajarri people moving from Cherrabun Pastoral Station where many of the men had previously worked as stockmen. The community became incorporated in 1983. Most of the people from Djugerari are part of the Walmajarri language group from the northern Great Sandy Desert region of Western Australia.

== Native title ==
The community is located within the registered area of the Yi-Martuwarra Ngurrara (WAD25/2012) native title claim.

== Governance ==
The community is managed through its incorporated body, Djugerari Aboriginal Corporation, incorporated under the Aboriginal Councils and Associations Act 1976 on 18 January 1983.

== Town planning ==
Djugerari Layout Plan No.1 has been prepared in accordance with State Planning Policy 3.2 Aboriginal Settlements. Layout Plan No.1 was endorsed by the community on 20 October 2010, and by the Western Australian Planning Commission on 14 December 2010.

The Layout Plan map-set and report can be viewed at Planning Western Australia's web site.
