= Joy Springs Community =

Community in Western Australia

Joy Springs Western Australia
- Coordinates: 18°19′56″S 125°41′32″E
- Postcode(s): 6765
- Elevation: 114 m (374 ft)
- Location: 30 km (19 mi) south of Fitzroy Crossing, Western Australia
- LGA(s): Shire of Derby–West Kimberley
- State electorate(s): Kimberley
- Federal division(s): Durack
Mean max temp	Mean min temp	Annual rainfall
35.6 °C; 96 °F	19.1 °C; 66 °F	541.2 mm 21.3 in

Joy Springs is a small Aboriginal community, located 30 km south east of Fitzroy Crossing in the Kimberley region of Western Australia, within the Shire of Derby–West Kimberley.

Joy Springs was established in 1987, as part of the broader outstation movement. It is often referred to as Eight Mile as the Joy Springs community is located at the site of the existing windmill at 8 Mile Well, on Gogo Station.

== Native title ==
The community is located within the registered Gooniyandi Combined 2 (WAD6008/00) native title claim area.

== Governance ==
The community is managed through its incorporated body, Eight Mile (Aboriginal Corporation), incorporated under the Aboriginal Councils and Associations Act 1976 on 22 November 1988.

== Town planning ==
Joy Springs Layout Plan No.1 has been prepared in accordance with State Planning Policy 3.2 Aboriginal Settlements. Layout Plan No.1 was endorsed by the community on 16 October 2008 and the Western Australian Planning Commission on 13 January 2009. The Layout Plan map-set and background report can be viewed at Planning Western Australia's website.
