= Ngalingkadji Community =

Community in Western Australia

Ngalingkadji Western Australia
- Coordinates: 18°39′27.6696″S 125°42′30.5634″E
- Postcode(s): 6765
- Location: 60 km (37 mi) south east of Fitzroy Crossing, Western Australia
- LGA(s): Shire of Derby–West Kimberley
- State electorate(s): Kimberley
- Federal division(s): Durack

Ngalingkadji is a small Aboriginal community located within the Shire of Derby–West Kimberley in Western Australia. It is located south-east of Fitzroy Crossing; 54 km by the sealed Great Northern Highway and 9 km by the unsealed Cherrabun Road. Ngalingkadji community is also referred to as Chestnut Bore.

== History ==
Most of the people from the community are part of the Gooniyandi language group from the Fitzroy Valley region of Western Australia. Ngalingkadji was established as a permanent Aboriginal community in the early 1980s by Gooniyandi people moving from Gogo Station where many of the men had worked as stockmen. The community became incorporated in 1983.

== Native title ==
The community is located within the registered Kurungal (WAD6217/98) native title claim area.

== Governance ==
The community is managed through its incorporated body, Ngalingkadji (Aboriginal Corporation), incorporated under the Aboriginal Councils and Associations Act 1976 on 24 June 1987.

== Town planning ==
Ngalingkadji Layout Plan No.1 has been prepared in accordance with State Planning Policy 3.2 Aboriginal Settlements. Layout Plan No.1 was endorsed by the community on 27 August 2010 and the Western Australian Planning Commission on 14 December 2010. The Layout Plan map-set and background report can be viewed at Planning Western Australia's website.
