= Koorabye community =

Community in Western Australia

Koorabye Western Australia
- Coordinates: 18.586°0′S 124.757°0′E
- Location: 100 km (62 mi) south west of Fitzroy Crossing
- LGA(s): Shire of Derby–West Kimberley
- State electorate(s): Kimberley
- Federal division(s): Durack

Koorabye is an Aboriginal community in the Kimberley region of Western Australia, within the Shire of Wyndham-East Kimberley.

== Background ==
Koorabye is located approximately 100 km south west of Fitzroy Crossing. Development at the community began in 1992 however secure land title to the site has not yet been received. The community is accessed from an unsealed road that extends approximately 95 km from Great Northern Highway, passing through Yungngora community. The community has an approximate population of 50 people.

The community consists of 14 houses, located around a central open space area. The community also contains a women's centre, single men's quarters and a primary school.

== Native title ==
The community is covered by the SDWK Nyikina Mangala Indigenous land use agreement (WI2005/001). Members of the community have cultural affiliations with the Walmatjarri people of the Great Sandy Desert.

== Governance ==
Koorabye does not have its own registered community corporation. The community is managed more broadly by the Marra Worra Worra Aboriginal Corporation, who provide CDEP and other services to the community.

== Town planning ==
Koorabye Layout Plan No.2 was prepared in accordance with State Planning Policy 3.2 Aboriginal Settlements. It was endorsed by the community and the Western Australian Planning Commission in 2007.
