= Ngallagunda Community =

Community in Western Australia

Ngallagunda
- Town
- Interactive map of Ngallagunda
- Coordinates: 16.426°0′S 126.43°0′E
- Country: Australia
- State: Western Australia
- LGA: Shire of Wyndham-East Kimberley
- Location: 300 km (190 mi) south west of Kununurra

Government
  - State electorate: Kimberley
  - Federal division: Durack
- Elevation: 47 m (154 ft)
- Postcode: 6743
- Mean max temp: 32.3 °C (90.1 °F)
- Mean min temp: 16.4 °C (61.5 °F)
- Annual rainfall: 999.3 mm (39.34 in)

Ngallagunda is a medium-sized Aboriginal community, located in the Kimberley region of Western Australia, within the Shire of Wyndham-East Kimberley.

== Native title ==
The community is located within the fully determined Wanjina-Wunggurr Wilinggin (WAD6016/96) native title claim area.

== Governance ==
The community is managed through its incorporated body, Ngallagunda Aboriginal Corporation, incorporated under the Aboriginal Councils and Associations Act 1976 on 13 October 1989.

== Town planning ==
Ngallagunda Layout Plan No.2 has been prepared in accordance with State Planning Policy 3.2 Aboriginal Settlements. Layout Plan No.2 was endorsed by the community on 7 July 2010 and the Western Australian Planning Commission on 14 December 2010. The Layout Plan map-set and background report can be viewed at Planning Western Australia's website.

== Climate ==
The nearby Mount Elizabeth Weather Station is the most northerly place in Australia to record a temperature below freezing. It dropped to -1.3 °C (29.7 °F) on 26 June 1998. This is also the lowest temperature recorded in the Kimberly region.

Climate data for Mount Elizabeth (1973–2013)
Month	Jan	Feb	Mar	Apr	May	Jun	Jul	Aug	Sep	Oct	Nov	Dec	Year
Record high °C (°F)	39.4 (102.9)	38.8 (101.8)	37.0 (98.6)	37.0 (98.6)	35.0 (95.0)	32.9 (91.2)	33.6 (92.5)	35.9 (96.6)	38.6 (101.5)	41.5 (106.7)	41.5 (106.7)	40.9 (105.6)	41.5 (106.7)
Mean daily maximum °C (°F)	33.0 (91.4)	32.1 (89.8)	32.3 (90.1)	32.5 (90.5)	29.9 (85.8)	28.0 (82.4)	28.5 (83.3)	30.5 (86.9)	34.1 (93.4)	35.9 (96.6)	36.2 (97.2)	34.1 (93.4)	32.3 (90.1)
Mean daily minimum °C (°F)	22.0 (71.6)	21.8 (71.2)	20.4 (68.7)	16.7 (62.1)	12.0 (53.6)	8.8 (47.8)	8.1 (46.6)	9.5 (49.1)	15.0 (59.0)	19.1 (66.4)	21.6 (70.9)	22.3 (72.1)	16.4 (61.5)
Record low °C (°F)	16.5 (61.7)	15.7 (60.3)	12.2 (54.0)	6.9 (44.4)	−0.9 (30.4)	−1.3 (29.7)	−0.1 (31.8)	0.0 (32.0)	2.8 (37.0)	9.0 (48.2)	13.8 (56.8)	12.0 (53.6)	−1.3 (29.7)
Average rainfall mm (inches)	255.7 (10.07)	225.3 (8.87)	165.1 (6.50)	39.6 (1.56)	13.4 (0.53)	12.8 (0.50)	3.1 (0.12)	1.9 (0.07)	8.6 (0.34)	32.5 (1.28)	74.4 (2.93)	166.9 (6.57)	999.3 (39.34)
Average rainy days (≥ 0.2mm)	16.9	15.3	11.6	3.4	1.5	0.9	0.5	0.3	1.1	3.9	8.0	11.6	75
Source: Bureau of Meteorology
