= Lundja community =

Community in Western Australia

Lundja Western Australia
- Coordinates: 18.1778°S 125.597°E
- Postcode(s): 6765
- Elevation: 747 m (2,451 ft)
- Location: 0 km (0 mi) north of Halls Creek, Western Australia
- LGA(s): Shire of Derby-West Kimberley
- State electorate(s): Kimberley
- Federal division(s): Durack

Lundja is a small Aboriginal community, located within the town of Halls Creek in the Kimberley region of Western Australia, within the Shire of Derby-West Kimberley.

== History ==
Jaru people, originally from Flora Valley Station, Ruby Plains and Old Halls Creek and who had previously camped around Number Two Reserve, moved to Red Hill in 1977. These people stated that this move was prompted by the need to move away from the heavy drinking and its associated problems at Number Two Reserve. A ban on the use of alcohol in the newly founded community was and is successfully maintained.

The current residents of Lundja are the descendendants of the people who initially established the community. The community is a cohesive group who maintain their language and are active in maintaining their customary practices and beliefs.

== Governance ==
The community is managed through its incorporated body, Lundja Aboriginal Corporation, incorporated under the Aboriginal Councils and Associations Act 1976 on 27 August 1979.

== Town planning ==
Lundja Layout Plan No.1 has been prepared in accordance with State Planning Policy 3.2 Aboriginal Settlements. The Layout Plan was endorsed by the community on 6 February 2003 and the Western Australian Planning Commission on 15 April 2003. The Layout Plan map-set and background report are available at the Department of Planning, Lands and Heritage website.
