= Four Mile, Western Australia =

Community in Western Australia

Four Mile
- Town
- Coordinates: 15.897415°0′S 128.939932°0′E
- Country: Australia
- State: Western Australia
- LGA: Shire of Wyndham-East Kimberley
- Location: 20 km (12 mi) south west of Kununurra

Government
  - State electorate: Kimberley
  - Federal division: Durack
- Elevation: 47 m (154 ft)
- Postcode: 6743
- Mean max temp: 35.0 °C (95.0 °F)
- Mean min temp: 21.6 °C (70.9 °F)
- Annual rainfall: 790.7 mm (31.13 in)

Four Mile is a small Aboriginal community, located proximate to Kununurra in the Kimberley region of Western Australia, within the Shire of Wyndham-East Kimberley.

== Native title ==
The community is located within the determined area of the Miriuwung-Gajerrong (Western Australia) (WAD6001/1995) native title claim.

The Miriuwung Gajerrong people are also signatories to the Ord Final Agreement, a broad package of measures which implements a platform for future partnerships between the Miriuwung Gajerrong people, WA State Government, industry and developers for the benefit of the wider community and the East Kimberley region.

== Governance ==
At a broader governance level, Yawoorroong Miriuwung Gajerrong Yirrgeb Noong Dawang Aboriginal Corporation (MG Corp) acts in trust on behalf of all MG native title holders to ensure compliance with its obligations under the Ord Final Agreement including those relating to community living areas.

MG Corp was incorporated under the Corporations (Aboriginal and Torres Strait Islander) Act 2006 in 2006 and its constitution was subsequently amended in 2008.

Although membership to MG Corp is limited to native title holders, MG Corp is not a native title prescribed body corporate. However MG Corp has the authority to assist MG peoples in relation to planning, management and use of traditional lands.

The community is also managed through its incorporated body, Four Mile Aboriginal Corporation, incorporated under the Aboriginal Councils and Associations Act 1976 on 28 June 1993.

== Town planning ==
Four Mile Layout Plan No.1 has been prepared in accordance with State Planning Policy 3.2 Aboriginal Settlements. Layout Plan No.1 was endorsed by the community on 17 January 2011, and by the Western Australian Planning Commission on 29 September 2011.

== External references ==
- Planning Western Australia's official site - Four Mile Layout Plan:
