= Gulgagulganeng community =

Community in Western Australia

Gulgagulganeng Western Australia
- Coordinates: 15.814139°0′S 128.790673°0′E
- Elevation: 47 m (154 ft)
- Location: 8 km (5 mi) south east of Kununurra
- LGA(s): Shire of Wyndham-East Kimberley
- State electorate(s): Kimberley
- Federal division(s): Durack

Gulgagulganeng (also referred to as Emu Creek) is a small Aboriginal community, located proximate to Kununurra in the Kimberley region of Western Australia, within the Shire of Wyndham-East Kimberley.

== Background ==
The community has a population which fluctuates between 10 people and 60 people. There are four main houses within the community, as well as multiple other informal shelters. Some residents at Emu Creek have genealogical and cultural affiliations with the Mirima community.

== Native title ==
The community's people are signatories to the Ord Final Agreement, a broad package of measures which implements a platform for future partnerships between the Miriuwung Gajerrong people, WA State Government, industry and developers for the benefit of the wider community and the East Kimberley region.

== Governance ==
The community is managed through its incorporated body, Gulgagulganeng Aboriginal Corporation, incorporated under the Aboriginal Councils and Associations Act 1976 on 10 September 1986.

== Town planning ==
Gulgagulganeng Layout Plan No. 1 has been prepared in accordance with State Planning Policy 3.2 Aboriginal Settlements. Layout Plan No. 1 was endorsed by the community on 26 February 2003 and the Western Australian Planning Commission on 15 April 2003. The layout plan map-set can be viewed at Planning Western Australia official site.
