= Kandiwal community =

Community in Western Australia

Kandiwal
- Interactive map of Kandiwal
- Coordinates: 14.820666°0′S 125.841971°0′E
- Country: Australia
- State: Western Australia
- LGA: Shire of Wyndham-East Kimberley
- Location: 300 km (190 mi) north west of Kununurra

Government
  - State electorate: Kimberley
  - Federal division: Durack
- Elevation: 47 m (154 ft)
- Postcode: 6743
- Mean max temp: 35.0 °C (95.0 °F)
- Mean min temp: 21.6 °C (70.9 °F)
- Annual rainfall: 790.7 mm (31.13 in)

Kandiwal, also spelt Kandijwal, is a small Aboriginal community, located in the Kimberley region of Western Australia, within the Shire of Wyndham-East Kimberley.

== Native title ==
The community is located within the determined Uunguu (WAD6033/1999) native title claim area.

== Governance ==
The community is managed through its incorporated body, Kandiwal (Aboriginal Corporation), incorporated under the Aboriginal Councils and Associations Act 1976 on 30 April 1987.

== Town planning ==
Kandiwal Layout Plan No.1 has been prepared in accordance with State Planning Policy 3.2 Aboriginal Settlements. Layout Plan No.1 was endorsed by the community on 28 April 2010 and the Western Australian Planning Commission on 8 June 2010.
