= Kurnangki community =

Community in Western Australia

Kurnangki Western Australia
- Coordinates: 18.1778°S 125.597°E
- Postcode(s): 6765
- Elevation: 747 m (2,451 ft)
- Location: 0 km (0 mi) north of Fitzroy Crossing, Western Australia
- LGA(s): Shire of Derby-West Kimberley
- State electorate(s): Kimberley
- Federal division(s): Durack

Kurnangki is a medium-sized Aboriginal community, located within the town of Fitzroy Crossing in the Kimberley region of Western Australia, within the Shire of Derby-West Kimberley.

== History ==
The Kurnangki "village" was designed and constructed by the community with the assistance of the State Housing Commission of Western Australia. The community was opened on 28 June 1985.

== Governance ==
The community is managed through its incorporated body, Kurnangki Aboriginal Corporation, incorporated under the Aboriginal Councils and Associations Act 1976 on 27 August 1979.

== Town planning ==
Kurnangki Layout Plan No.1 has been prepared in accordance with State Planning Policy 3.2 Aboriginal Settlements. Layout Plan No.1 was endorsed by the community on 24 February 2004 and the Western Australian Planning Commission on 8 April 2008.
