= Ganinyi =

Community in Western Australia

- Town
- Coordinates: 18°42′41″S 126°42′59″E
- Country: Australia
- State: Western Australia
- LGA: Shire of Halls Creek
- Location: 110 km (68 mi) W of Halls Creek, Western Australia

Government
  - State electorate: Kimberley
  - Federal division: Durack
- Elevation: 422 m (1,385 ft)
- Postcode: 6770
- Mean max temp: 33.6 °C (92.5 °F)
- Mean min temp: 20.0 °C (68.0 °F)
- Annual rainfall: 557.4 mm (21.94 in)

Ganinyi is a small Aboriginal community 110 km west of Halls Creek in the Kimberley region of Western Australia, within the Shire of Halls Creek.

== Education ==
Children of school age in Ganinyi attend Yiyili Community School. The school provides education from kindergarten through Year 10 for students from Yiyili as well as nearby outstations including Ganinyi, Girriyoowa, Goolgaradah, Kurinyjarn, and Rocky Springs. In 2010, the school had an enrolment of 72 students. A daily bus service operated by the school collects students from other nearby communities including Moongardie 30 km distant. The school provides lunch for students. Students who progress beyond Year 10 attend boarding school in Darwin and other larger towns.

== Native title ==
The community is located within the registered area of the Gooniyandi Combined #2 (WAD6008/2000) native title claim.

== Governance ==
The community is managed through its incorporated body, Ganinyi Aboriginal Corporation, incorporated under the Aboriginal Councils and Associations Act 1976 on 23 November 1988.

== Town planning ==
Ganinyi does not have its on Layout Plan, but comes under the Yiyili including Ganinyi, Girriyoowa and Kurinyjarn Layout Plan No.2. This was prepared in accordance with State Planning Policy 3.2 Aboriginal Settlements, and was endorsed by the Ganinyi community on 2 December 2010, and by the Western Australian Planning Commission in on 29 September 2011.

The Layout Plan map-set and background report can be viewed at Planning Western Australia's web site.
