= Woolah Community =

Community in Western Australia

Woolah
- Town
- Interactive map of Woolah
- Coordinates: 16.199°0′S 128.268°0′E
- Country: Australia
- State: Western Australia
- LGA: Shire of Wyndham-East Kimberley
- Location: 60 km (37 mi) south west of Kununurra

Government
  - State electorate: Kimberley
  - Federal division: Durack
- Elevation: 47 m (154 ft)

Population
  - Total: 43 (ILOC 2021)
- Postcode: 6743
- Mean max temp: 35.0 °C (95.0 °F)
- Mean min temp: 21.6 °C (70.9 °F)
- Annual rainfall: 790.7 mm (31.13 in)

Woolah (also referred to as Doon Doon) is a medium-sized Aboriginal community, located in the Kimberley region of Western Australia, within the Shire of Wyndham-East Kimberley.

== Background ==
Woolah is located approximately 300 metres off the Great Northern Highway, 120 kilometres south of Kununurra. The community was established as part of Doon Doon Station in the mid-1970s. The population consists predominantly of Gija people. Population is estimated at around 80 people, in 14 houses.

== Native title ==
The community is located within the registered Yurriyangem Taam (WAD268/10) native title claim area.

== Governance ==
The community is managed through its incorporated body, Woolah Aboriginal Corporation, incorporated under the Aboriginal Councils and Associations Act 1976 on 27 October 1980.

== Town planning ==
Woolah Layout Plan No.1 has been prepared in accordance with State Planning Policy 3.2 Aboriginal Settlements. Layout Plan No.1 was endorsed by the community on 24 May 2000 and the Western Australian Planning Commission on 1 March 2001. The Layout Plan map-set and background report can be viewed at Planning Western Australia's website.
