= Bidan Community =

Community in Western Australia

Bidan Western Australia
- Coordinates: 17°38′41.2″S 123°10′2.5″E
- Postcode(s): 6728
- Location: 100 km (62 mi) E of Broome
- LGA(s): Shire of Derby-West Kimberley
- State electorate(s): Kimberley
- Federal division(s): Durack

Bidan is a small Aboriginal community, located 110 km east of Broome in the Kimberley region of Western Australia, within the Shire of Derby-West Kimberley. Bidan occupies a unique location in the West Kimberley settlement pattern in the sense that it is proximate to the midway point between the coastal regional centres of Broome and Derby.

== History ==
Bidan Community (formally Bedunburru) was loosely established in 1985 on the lower black soils of the "old camp" to the east of the current settlement. In earlier times the Nyikina people would bring their children to stop in the Bidan area during the dry season. However, due to periodic inundation the existing community moved to higher ground. The existing settlement, with more permanent buildings, was established during the 1990s.

== Native title ==
The community is located within the registered Nyikina Mangala (WAD 6099/98) Indigenous land use agreement area.

== Governance ==
The community is managed through its incorporated body, Bidan Aboriginal Corporation (formally Bedunburru (Aboriginal Corporation)), incorporated under the Corporations (Aboriginal and Torres Strait Islander) Act 2006 on 26 August 1988.

== Town planning ==
Bidan Layout Plan No.1 has been prepared in accordance with State Planning Policy 3.2 Aboriginal Settlements. Layout Plan No.1 was endorsed by the community on 26 May 2011 and the Western Australian Planning Commission 29 September 2011. The Layout Plan map-set and background report can be viewed at Planning Western Australia.
