= Junjuwa community =

Community in Western Australia

Junjuwa Western Australia
- Coordinates: 18.176°S 125.567°E
- Location: 0 km (0 mi) N of Fitzroy Crossing, Western Australia
- LGA(s): Shire of Derby-West Kimberley
- State electorate(s): Kimberley
- Federal division(s): Durack

Junjuwa is a large Aboriginal community, located within the town of Fitzroy Crossing in the Kimberley region of Western Australia, within the Shire of Derby-West Kimberley.

== History ==
The Junjuwa settlement was first established between 1974 and 1976. Government policies in the 1970s led to the inappropriate grouping of clan and language groups. Gradually this mix of language groups has changed so that the local Bunuba people are the majority inhabitants of Junjuwa.

== Governance ==
The community is managed through its incorporated body, Bunuba Aboriginal Corporation, incorporated under the Aboriginal Councils and Associations Act 1976 on 16 September 1991.

== Town planning ==
Junjuwa Layout Plan No.1 has been prepared in accordance with State Planning Policy 3.2 Aboriginal Settlements. Layout Plan No.1 was endorsed by the community on 24 February 2004 and the Western Australian Planning Commission on 8 April 2008.
