= Ngumpan Community =

Community in Western Australia

Coordinates: 18°46′S 126°02′E

Ngumpan Western Australia
- Postcode(s): 6765
- Location: 95 km (59 mi) south east of Fitzroy Crossing, Western Australia
- LGA(s): Shire of Halls Creek
- State electorate(s): Kimberley
- Federal division(s): Durack
Mean max temp	Mean min temp	Annual rainfall
33.6 °C; 92 °F	20.0 °C; 68 °F	557.4 mm 21.9 in

Ngumpan is a small Aboriginal community, located 95 km south east of Fitzroy Crossing in the Kimberley region of Western Australia, within the Shire of Halls Creek.

== Native title ==
The community is located within the registered Kurungal (WAD6217/98) native title claim area.

== Governance ==
The community is managed through its incorporated body, Ngumpan Aboriginal Corporation, incorporated under the Aboriginal Councils and Associations Act 1976 on 1 July 1981.

== Town planning ==
Ngumpan Layout Plan No.1 has been prepared in accordance with State Planning Policy 3.2 Aboriginal Settlements. Layout Plan No.1 was endorsed by the community on 26 July 2002 and the Western Australian Planning Commission on 4 May 2004. The Layout Plan map-set can be viewed at Planning Western Australia's website.
