= Ngunulum Community =

Community in Western Australia

Ngunulum Western Australia
- Coordinates: 15.94645°0′S 128.952151°0′E
- Postcode(s): 6743
- Elevation: 47 m (154 ft)
- Location: 25 km (16 mi) south west of Kununurra
- LGA(s): Shire of Wyndham-East Kimberley
- State electorate(s): Kimberley
- Federal division(s): Durack
Mean max temp	Mean min temp	Annual rainfall
35.0 °C; 95 °F	21.6 °C; 71 °F	790.7 mm 31.1 in

Ngunulum (also referred to as Cockatoo Springs) is a small Aboriginal community, located proximate to Kununurra in the Kimberley region of Western Australia, within the Shire of Wyndham-East Kimberley.

== Native title ==
The Miriuwung Gajerrong people are signatories to the Ord Final Agreement, a broad package of measures which implements a platform for future partnerships between the Miriuwung Gajerrong people, WA State Government, industry and developers for the benefit of the wider community and the East Kimberley region.

== Governance ==
At a broader governance level, Yawoorroong Miriuwung Gajerrong Yirrgeb Noong Dawang Aboriginal Corporation (MG Corp) acts in trust on behalf of all MG native title holders to ensure compliance with its obligations under the Ord Final Agreement including those relating to community living areas.

MG Corp was incorporated under the Corporations (Aboriginal and Torres Strait Islander) Act 2006 in 2006 and its constitution was subsequently amended in 2008.

Although membership to MG Corp is limited to native title holders, MG Corp is not a native title prescribed body corporate. However MG Corp has the authority to assist MG peoples in relation to planning, management and use of traditional lands.

== Town planning ==
Ngunulum Layout Plan No.1 has been prepared in accordance with State Planning Policy 3.2 Aboriginal Settlements, and was endorsed by the community on 17 January 2011 and the Western Australian Planning Commission on 29 September 2011. The Layout Plan map-set and background report can be viewed at Planning Western Australia's website.
