= Jimbalakudunj Community =

Community in Western Australia

Jimbalakudunj Western Australia
- Coordinates: 17.8924°S 124.6447°E
- Postcode(s): 6728
- Location: 100 km (62 mi) north west of Fitzroy Crossing, Western Australia
- LGA(s): Shire of Derby–West Kimberley
- State electorate(s): Kimberley
- Federal division(s): Durack

Jimbalakudunj is a small Aboriginal community located approximately 100 kilometres (62 mi) north west of Fitzroy Crossing in the Kimberley region of Western Australia, within the Shire of Derby–West Kimberley.

Jimbalakudunj occupies a unique location in the West Kimberley settlement pattern in the sense that it is proximate to the midway point between the coastal regional centres of Broome/Derby and the inland regional centre of Fitzroy Crossing.

== History ==
Jimbalakudunj was established in the early 1990s by members of the Nargoodah family moving away from Noonkanbah and Fitzroy Crossing onto Paradise Downs Station. An entity to manage the affairs of the community was established in 199.

== Native title ==
The community is located within the SDWK Nyikina Mangala (WI2005/001) Indigenous land use agreement area.

== Governance ==
The community is managed through its incorporated body, Jimbalakudunj Aboriginal Corporation, incorporated under the Aboriginal Councils and Associations Act 1976 on 27 May 1991.

== Town planning ==
Jimbalakudunj Layout Plan No.1 has been prepared in accordance with State Planning Policy 3.2 Aboriginal Settlements. Layout Plan No.1 was endorsed by.
