= Munthamar Community =

Community in Western Australia

Munthamar Western Australia
- Coordinates: 15.883353°0′S 128.773735°0′E
- Postcode(s): 6743
- Elevation: 47 m (154 ft)
- Location: 10 km (6 mi) south east of Kununurra
- LGA(s): Shire of Wyndham-East Kimberley
- State electorate(s): Kimberley
- Federal division(s): Durack
Mean max temp	Mean min temp	Annual rainfall
35.0 °C; 95 °F	21.6 °C; 71 °F	790.7 mm 31.1 in

Munthamar is a small Aboriginal community, located proximate to Kununurra in the Kimberley region of Western Australia, within the Shire of Wyndham-East Kimberley.

== History ==
Permanent dwellings were established in Munthamar in the early 1990s. Prior to that community members lived in self-made shacks in the vicinity, on what is now the Mud Springs reserve. The initial dwellings were self-made shelters and not connected to reticulated power and water. While living conditions were modest, the newly established camp offered space away from town life. Ruins from the initial camp site remain.

== Native title ==
The Miriuwung Gajerrong people are signatories to the Ord Final Agreement, a broad package of measures which implements a platform for future partnerships between the Miriuwung Gajerrong people, WA State Government, industry and developers for the benefit of the wider community and the East Kimberley region.

== Governance ==
At a broader governance level, Yawoorroong Miriuwung Gajerrong Yirrgeb Noong Dawang Aboriginal Corporation (MG Corp) acts in trust on behalf of all MG native title holders to ensure compliance with its obligations under the Ord Final Agreement including those relating to community living areas.

MG Corp was incorporated under the Corporations (Aboriginal and Torres Strait Islander) Act 2006 in 2006 and its constitution was subsequently amended in 2008.

Although membership to MG Corp is limited to native title holders, MG Corp is not a native title prescribed body corporate. However MG Corp has the authority to assist MG peoples in relation to planning, management and use of traditional lands.

== Town planning ==
Munthamar Layout Plan No.1 has been prepared in accordance with State Planning Policy 3.2 Aboriginal Settlements. Layout Plan No.1 was endorsed by the community on 16 November 2010 and the Western Australian Planning Commission on 29 September 2010. The Layout Plan map-set and background report can be viewed at Planning Western Australia's website.
