= Mount Margaret Aboriginal Community =

Community in Western Australia

Mount Margaret
- Coordinates: 28.794°0′S 122.186°0′E
- Country: Australia
- State: Western Australia
- LGA: Shire of Laverton
- Location: 20 km (12 mi) south west of Laverton

Government
  - State electorate: Kalgoorlie
  - Federal division: O'Connor
- Postcode: 6440

Mount Margaret Community (formerly Mount Margaret Mission) is a medium-sized Aboriginal community 20 km south west of Laverton in the Goldfields-Esperance region of Western Australia, within the Shire of Laverton.

The community is managed through its incorporated body, Aboriginal Movement for Outback Survival Aboriginal Corporation, incorporated under the Aboriginal Councils and Associations Act 1976 on 12 September 1997.

== History ==
The site of the community that is now Mount Margaret was founded as a mission by the United Aborigines Mission in 1921, and soon drew Aboriginal people from surrounding areas. By 1928, after the mission became the central rationing station for the whole district, the WA Government moved the Mount Margaret mission further east.

The process of establishing formal independence from the United Aborigines Mission was concluded in 1976, with the Aboriginal Movement for Outback Survival Aboriginal Corporation, an association formed by past and present Mount Margaret residents taking over responsibility for the community.

The hospital building has been assessed for heritage value.

== Native title ==
The community is located within the registered Nyalpa Pirniku (WAD91/2019) native title claim area.

== Education ==
Children of school age at Mount Margaret attend The Mount Margaret Remote Community School. The school caters for K to Year 7. Aboriginal English is the first language of most of the students, but there are some small cohorts for whom Ngaanyatjarra or Wangkatha is their first language. The traditional language, Wangkatha, is taught as a subject. The large school playground is enhanced by mature trees and neat garden and lawn areas. The students share the responsibility for maintaining the environment.

== Town planning ==
Mt Margaret Layout Plan No.1 has been prepared in accordance with State Planning Policy 3.2 Aboriginal Settlements. Layout Plan No.1 was endorsed by the community on 14 August 2001 and the Western Australian Planning Commission on 9 October 2001.
