= Pia Wadjari Community =

Community in Western Australia

Pia Wadjari Western Australia
- Coordinates: 27.121°0′S 116.394°0′E
- Postcode(s): 6630
- Location: 320 km (199 mi) NE of Geraldton; 200 km (124 mi) WSW of Cue
- LGA(s): Shire of Murchison
- State electorate(s): North West
- Federal division(s): Durack

Pia Wadjari is a medium-sized Aboriginal community, located in the Mid-West region of Western Australia, within the Shire of Murchison.

== Native title ==
The community is located within the registered Wajarri Yamatji (WAD6033/98) native title claim area.

== Education ==
Children of school age at Pia Wadjari attend the Pia Wadjarri Remote Community School. The school caters for students in years K–12 and has an enrolment of up to 20 students.

== Governance ==
The community is managed through its incorporated body, Pia Wadjari Aboriginal Corporation, incorporated under the Aboriginal Councils and Associations Act 1976 on 11 September 1986.

== Town planning ==
Pia Wadjari Layout Plan No.1 has been prepared in accordance with State Planning Policy 3.2 Aboriginal Settlements. Layout Plan No.1 was endorsed by the community on 2 September 2002 and the Western Australian Planning Commission on 1 July 2003.
