= Iragul Community =

Community in Western Australia

Iragul Western Australia
- Coordinates: 32.118133°0′S 121.69529°0′E
- Postcode(s): 6443
- Location: 15 km (9 mi) north of Norseman
- LGA(s): Shire of Dundas
- State electorate(s): Eyre
- Federal division(s): O'Connor

Iragul is a small Aboriginal community, located in the Goldfields–Esperance region of Western Australia, within the Shire of Dundas.

== Native title ==
The community is located within the registered Ngadju (WAD6020/98) native title claim area.

== Governance ==
The community is managed through its incorporated body, Iragul Aboriginal Corporation, incorporated under the Aboriginal Councils and Associations Act 1976 on 13 February 1989.

== Town planning ==
Layout Plan No.1 has been prepared in accordance with State Planning Policy 3.2 Aboriginal Settlements. Layout Plan No.1 was endorsed by the community on 20 April 2004 and the Western Australian Planning Commission on 17 January 2006.
