= Bondini =

Community in Western Australia

Bondini Western Australia
- Coordinates: 26.601°0′S 120.265°0′E
- Postcode(s): 6646
- Location: 10 km (6 mi) east of Wiluna
- LGA(s): Shire of Wiluna
- State electorate(s): Kalgoorlie
- Federal division(s): Durack
Mean max temp	Mean min temp	Annual rainfall
29.1 °C; 84 °F	14.2 °C; 58 °F	257.6 mm 10.1 in

Bondini is a small Aboriginal community, located 10 km east of Wiluna in the Goldfields-Esperance region of Western Australia, within the Shire of Wiluna. In the 2001 census, Bondini had a population of 105, including 102 Aboriginal and Torres Strait Islander people.

== Native title ==
The community is located within the determination area of the Wiluna (WAD6164/1998, WAD248/2007, WAS181/2012) native title claim area.

== Governance ==
Bondini is not represented by an Incorporated Community Council. As a replacement the community is semi represented by the Mid-west Employment Education Development Aboriginal Corporation.

== Town planning ==
Bondini Layout Plan No.1 has been prepared in accordance with State Planning Policy 3.2 Aboriginal Settlements. Layout Plan No.1 was endorsed by the community on 8 August 2012, and by the Western Australian Planning Commission on 24 February 2004.

The Layout Plan map-set and background report can be viewed at Planning Western Australia's website.
