= Warrayu community =

Community in Western Australia

Warrayu
- Coordinates: 15.479°0′S 128.12°0′E
- Country: Australia
- State: Western Australia
- LGA: Shire of Wyndham-East Kimberley

Government
  - State electorate: Kimberley
  - Federal division: Durack
- Elevation: 47 m (154 ft)

Warrayu is a small Aboriginal community, located proximate to Wyndham in the Kimberley region of Western Australia, within the Shire of Wyndham-East Kimberley.

== Background ==
The Warrayu community was established in the early seventies and maintains cultural and genealogical connections with Forrest River Mission community, otherwise known as Oombulgurri. The older residents of Warrayu community are originally from ancestral grounds near Oombulgurri.

== Native title ==
The community is covered by the registered Balangarra 3 native title claim (WC00/6).

== Governance ==
The community is managed by the Warrayu Aboriginal Corporation, incorporated under the Commonwealth's Incorporations and Associations Act.

== Town planning ==
Warrayu Layout Plan No.1 has been prepared in accordance with State Planning Policy 3.2 Aboriginal Settlements, and was endorsed by the community on 23 January 2003 and the Western Australian Planning Commission on 15 April 2003. The Layout Plan map-set and background report can be viewed at Planning Western Australia's website.
