= Yarrunga Community =

Community in Western Australia

Yarrunga Western Australia
- Coordinates: 17.867°0′S 127.865°0′E
- Postcode(s): 6770
- Location: 50 km (31 mi) north east of Halls Creek
- LGA(s): Shire of Halls Creek
- State electorate(s): Kimberley
- Federal division(s): Durack
Mean max temp	Mean min temp	Annual rainfall
33.6 °C; 92 °F	20.00 °C; 68 °F	557.4 mm 21.9 in

Yarrunga is a small Aboriginal community, located 50 km north east of Halls Creek in the Kimberley region of Western Australia, within the Shire of Halls Creek.

== History ==
The Community was set up in the late 1980s largely as a community to house aged persons away from the Halls Creek townsite.

== Governance ==
The community is managed through its incorporated body, Yarrunga Aboriginal Corporation, incorporated under the Aboriginal Councils and Associations Act 1976 on 15 September 1983.

== Town planning ==
Yarrunga Layout Plan No.1 has been prepared in accordance with State Planning Policy 3.2 Aboriginal Settlements. Layout Plan No.1 is yet to be endorsed by the community. As such the Layout Plan exists only as a draft. The DRAFT Layout Plan map-set and background report can be viewed at Planning Western Australia's website.
