= Kupartiya Community =

Community in Western Australia

Kupartiya
- Town
- Coordinates: 18.893°0′S 126.243°0′E
- Country: Australia
- State: Western Australia
- LGA(s): Shire of Halls Creek
- Location: 130 km (81 mi) south east of Fitzroy Crossing

Government
  - State electorate(s): Kimberley
  - Federal division(s): Durack

Area
  - Total: 6.1 km^{2} (2.4 sq mi)

Population
  - Total(s): 56 (SAL 2021)
- Mean max temp: 33.6 °C (92.5 °F)
- Mean min temp: 20.00 °C (68.00 °F)
- Annual rainfall: 557.4 mm (21.94 in)

Kupartiya is a small Aboriginal community, located 130 km south east of Fitzroy Crossing in the Kimberley region of Western Australia, within the Shire of Halls Creek.

== Native title ==
The community is located within the registered Gooniyandi Combined 2 (WAD6008/00) native title claim area.

== Town planning ==
Kupartiya Layout Plan No.1 has been prepared in accordance with State Planning Policy 3.2 Aboriginal Settlements. The Draft Layout Plan map-set is online.
