= Jarlmadangah Burru Community =

Community in Western Australia

Jarlmadangah Burru
- Town
- Coordinates: 18°00′49″S 124°00′41″E
- Country: Australia
- State: Western Australia
- LGA: Shire of Derby-West Kimberley
- Location: 86 km (53 mi) southeast of Derby, Western Australia

Government
  - State electorate: Kimberley
  - Federal division: Durack

Area
  - Total: 7.2 km^{2} (2.8 sq mi)

Population
  - Total: 35 (SAL 2021)
- Postcode: 6728

Jarlmadangah Burru is an Aboriginal community located 86 kilometres (53 mi) southeast of Derby in the Kimberley region of Western Australia, within the Shire of Derby-West Kimberley.

Jarlmadangah Burru is in the Grant Ranges of the West Kimberley, close to the Fitzroy River. Camballin and Looma are the nearest towns, approximately 19 kilometres (12 mi) east and 15 kilometres (9.3 mi) ESE, respectively, from Jarlmadangah Burru.

== History ==
Jarlmadangah Burru was established in 1987 by the traditional owners of the country. The community land holding was excised from Mt Anderson Station. The land that the community has been built on was chosen by the traditional owners as a place where activity would not compromise culture and heritage sites. The people of Jarlmadangah Burru maintain a close association with Mt Anderson Station.

== Native title ==
The community is located within the SDWK Nyikina Mangala (WI2005/001) Indigenous land use agreement area.

== Education ==
Children of school age at Jarlmadangah Burru attend the Nyikina Mangala Community School, which was established in 2000 to provide an appropriate educational service for the Jarlmadangah Burru Aboriginal community. The school is currently registered from kindergarten to year 10 and caters for 35 students grouped into three classes, junior primary, middle primary, and upper primary/secondary.

== Governance ==
The community is managed through the Jarlmadangah Burru Aboriginal Corporation, which was incorporated under the Aboriginal Councils and Associations Act 1976 on 3 December 1987.

== Town planning ==
The Jarlmadangah Layout Plan No.2 was prepared in accordance with State Planning Policy: 3.2 Aboriginal Settlements. Layout Plan No.2 was endorsed by the community on 1 May 2007 and the Western Australian Planning Commission on 24 July 2007.
