= Mandangala Community =

Community in Western Australia

Mandangala Western Australia
- Coordinates: 16.544°0′S 128.357°0′E
- Population: 72 (2020)
- Postcode(s): 6743
- Elevation: 47 m (154 ft)
- Location: 130 km (81 mi) south west of Kununurra
- LGA(s): Shire of Wyndham-East Kimberley
- State electorate(s): Kimberley
- Federal division(s): Durack
Mean max temp	Mean min temp	Annual rainfall
35.0 °C; 95 °F	21.6 °C; 71 °F	790.7 mm 31.1 in

Mandangala is a medium-sized Aboriginal community, located in the Kimberley region of Western Australia, within the Shire of Wyndham-East Kimberley. The local Aboriginal languages of the community are Miriwoong and Kija; most people in the community speak those languages.

== Governance ==
The community is managed through its incorporated body, Mandangala Aboriginal Corporation, incorporated under the Aboriginal Councils and Associations Act 1976 on 10 September 1986.

== Town planning ==
Mandangala Layout Plan No.1 has been prepared in accordance with State Planning Policy 3.2 Aboriginal Settlements. Layout Plan No.1 was endorsed by the Western Australian Planning Commission on 1 June 2001.
