= Weymul Community =

Community in Western Australia

Weymul Western Australia
- Coordinates: 21.016°0′S 116.801°0′E
- Postcode(s): 6718
- Location: 30 km (19 mi) south of Karratha
- LGA(s): City of Karratha
- State electorate(s): North West
- Federal division(s): Durack
Mean max temp	Mean min temp	Annual rainfall
34.0 °C; 93 °F	20.5 °C; 69 °F	311.3 mm 12.3 in

Weymul (also referred to as Chirrata) is a small Aboriginal community, located 30 km south of Karratha in the Pilbara region of Western Australia, within the City of Karratha.

== Native title ==
The community is located within the fully determined Ngarluma / Yindjibarndi (WAD6017/96) native title claim area.

== Governance ==
The community is managed through its incorporated body, Weymul Aboriginal Corporation, incorporated under the Aboriginal Councils and Associations Act 1976.

== Town planning ==
Weymul Layout Plan No.2 has been prepared in accordance with State Planning Policy 3.2 Aboriginal Settlements. Layout Plan No.2 was endorsed by the community on 10 April 2007 and the Western Australian Planning Commission on 1 July 2008. The Layout Plan map-set and background report can be viewed at Planning Western Australia's website.
