= Pandanus Park Community =

Community in Western Australia

Coordinates: 17°44′17″S 123°39′36″E

Pandanus Park Western Australia
- Population: 125 (2016 census)
- Postcode(s): 6728
- Location: 60 km (37 mi) south of Derby, Western Australia
- LGA(s): Shire of Derby–West Kimberley
- State electorate(s): Kimberley
- Federal division(s): Durack
Mean max temp	Mean min temp	Annual rainfall
33.9 °C; 93 °F	21.7 °C; 71 °F	622.4 mm 24.5 in

Pandanus Park is a medium-sized Aboriginal community, located 60 kilometres (37 mi) south of Derby in the Kimberley region of Western Australia, within the Shire of Derby–West Kimberley. It is on the banks of the Fitzroy River just off the Great Northern Highway opposite the Willare Roadhouse.

== Native title ==
The community is an area where exclusive native title rights and interests has been determined by the Federal Court to exist: Watson on behalf of the Nyikina Mangala People v State of Western Australia (No 6).

== Governance ==
The community is managed through its incorporated body, Yurmulun Aboriginal Corporation (formally Pandanus Park (Aboriginal Corporation)), incorporated under the Corporations (Aboriginal and Torres Strait Islander) Act 2006 on 5 August 1987.

In 2011 the community was the 13th in Western Australia to be declared to be alcohol free. The restrictions made it illegal to sell, supply or bring alcohol into the community.

== Town planning ==
Pandanus Park Layout Plan No.1 has been prepared in accordance with State Planning Policy 3.2 Aboriginal Settlements. Layout Plan No. was endorsed by. The Layout Plan map-set and background report can be viewed at Planning Western Australia's website.
