= Yulga Jinna Community =

Community in Western Australia

Yulga Jinna Western Australia
- Coordinates: 25.612°0′S 118.558°0′E
- Postcode(s): 6642
- Location: 130 km (81 mi) north of Meekatharra
- LGA(s): Shire of Meekatharra
- State electorate(s): North West
- Federal division(s): Durack
Mean max temp	Mean min temp	Annual rainfall
28.8 °C; 84 °F	15.8 °C; 60 °F	236.9 mm 9.3 in

Yulga Jinna is a medium-sized Aboriginal community located 130 km north of Meekatharra in the Mid-West region of Western Australia, within the Shire of Meekatharra.

== Native title ==
The community is located within the fully determined Nharnuwangga (WAD72/98) native title claim area.

== Education ==
Children of school age at Yulga Jinna attend the Yulga Jinna Remote Community School. The school caters for years K-10.

== Governance ==
The community is managed through its incorporated body, Yulga Jinna Aboriginal Corporation, incorporated under the Aboriginal Councils and Associations Act 1976 on 30 April 1993.

== Town planning ==
Yulga JinnaLayout Plan No1. has been prepared in accordance with State Planning Policy 3.2 Aboriginal Settlements. Layout Plan No.1 was endorsed by the community on 2 April 2007 and the Western Australian Planning Commission on 13 November 2007. The Layout Plan map-set and background report can be viewed at Planning Western Australia's website.
