= Mingullatharndo Community =

Community in Western Australia

Mingullatharndo Western Australia
- Coordinates: 20.799°0′S 117.215°0′E
- Postcode(s): 6718
- Location: 5 km (3 mi) south east of Roebourne
- LGA(s): City of Karratha
- State electorate(s): North West
- Federal division(s): Durack
Mean max temp	Mean min temp	Annual rainfall
34.0 °C; 93 °F	20.5 °C; 69 °F	311.3 mm 12.3 in

Mingullatharndo is a small Aboriginal community, located in the Pilbara region of Western Australia, within the City of Karratha.

== Background ==
Mingullatharndo Aboriginal Community (also known as 5 Mile) is located approximately 8 km south east of the Roebourne townsite. Access to the community is via a sealed road which connects with North West Coastal Highway.

The Mingullatharndo Association Inc. was established in 1986 by members of the Apostolic Church in Roebourne. The purpose of the community is to provide support for displaced persons and others with social or abuse problems.

== Native title ==
The community is located within the fully determined Ngarluma / Yindjibarndi (WAD6017/96) native title claim area.

== Governance ==
The community is managed through its incorporated body, Mingullatharndo Association Inc.

== Town planning ==
Mingullatharndo Layout Plan No.2 was prepared in accordance with State Planning Policy 3.2 Aboriginal Settlements and was endorsed by the community in 2007 and the Western Australian Planning Commission in 2008.
