= Morrell Park community =

Community in Western Australia

Morrell Park Community Western Australia
- Coordinates: 17.962°S 122.236°E
- Location: 0 km (0 mi) north of Broome, Western Australia
- LGA(s): Shire of Broome
- State electorate(s): Kimberley
- Federal division(s): Durack

Morrell Park is an Aboriginal community, located within the town of Broome in the Kimberley region of Western Australia.

== History ==
The Morrell Park area (Lot 82) was originally developed by John Morrell for use as a citrus and cashew nut plantation in the 1970s. The Aboriginal Lands Trust subsequently purchased Lot 82 and called for applications from Indigenous people interested in establishing horticultural projects based upon single family enterprise and leases were issued. Over subsequent years it was found that the conditions were unsuitable for horticulture, and the area evolved into a rural residential area with blocks leased from the ALT to around 23 families.

== Governance ==
Morrell Park is not a traditional community in that blocks are individually leased, and as such no community association exists to represent their interests. Individual lease holders negotiate directly with service providers.

== Town planning ==
Morrell Park Layout Plan No.1 was prepared in accordance with State Planning Policy 3.2 Aboriginal Settlements, and was endorsed by the community on 1 December 2005 and the Western Australian Planning Commission on 6 March 2007. The map-set is available at the Department of Planning, Lands and Heritage website.
