= Bell Springs Community =

Community in Western Australia

Bell Springs
- Town
- Interactive map of Bell Springs
- Coordinates: 15.885094°0′S 128.791306°0′E
- Country: Australia
- State: Western Australia
- LGA: Shire of Wyndham-East Kimberley
- Location: 10 km (6.2 mi) south of Kununurra

Government
  - State electorate: Kimberley
  - Federal division: Durack
- Elevation: 47 m (154 ft)
- Time zone: UTC+8 (AWST)
- Postcode: 6743
- Mean max temp: 35.0 °C (95.0 °F)
- Mean min temp: 21.6 °C (70.9 °F)
- Annual rainfall: 790.7 mm (31.13 in)

Bell Springs is a small Aboriginal community, located proximate to Kununurra in the Kimberley region of Western Australia, within the Shire of Wyndham-East Kimberley.

== Native title ==
The Miriuwung Gajerrong people are signatories to the Ord Final Agreement, a broad package of measures that implements a platform for future partnerships between the Miriuwung Gajerrong people, WA state government, industry and developers for the benefit of the wider community and the east Kimberley region.

== Governance ==
At a broader governance level, Yawoorroong Miriuwung Gajerrong Yirrgeb Noong Dawang Aboriginal Corporation (MG Corp) acts in trust on behalf of all MG native title holders to ensure compliance with its obligations under the Ord Final Agreement including those relating to community living areas.

MG Corp was incorporated under the Corporations (Aboriginal and Torres Strait Islander) Act 2006 in 2006 and its constitution was subsequently amended in 2008.

Although membership to MG Corp is limited to native title holders, MG Corp is not a native title prescribed body corporate. However MG Corp has the authority to assist MG peoples in relation to planning, management and use of traditional lands.

== Town planning ==
Bell Springs Layout Plan No. 1 has been prepared in accordance with State Planning Policy 3.2 (Aboriginal Settlements). Layout Plan No. 1 was endorsed by the community on 3 August 2012 and the Western Australian Planning Commission on 12 February 2013. The Layout Plan map-set and background report can be viewed at the Planning Western Australia official site.
