= Bayulu Community =

Community in Western Australia

Bayulu Western Australia
- Coordinates: 18.294°S 125.600°E
- Population: 320 (2011 census)
- Postcode(s): 6765
- Elevation: 114 m (374 ft)
- Location: 10 km (6 mi) south of Fitzroy Crossing, Western Australia
- LGA(s): Shire of Derby-West Kimberley
- State electorate(s): Kimberley
- Federal division(s): Durack
Mean max temp	Mean min temp	Annual rainfall
35.6 °C; 96 °F	19.1 °C; 66 °F	541.2 mm 21.3 in

Bayulu is a large Aboriginal community located 10 km south of Fitzroy Crossing in the Kimberley region of Western Australia, within the Shire of Derby–West Kimberley. At the 2011 census, Bayulu had a population of 320.

== History ==
Bayulu was originally established as part of Gogo Station but was relocated to its current position in 1987.

== Native title ==
The community is located within the registered Gooniyandi Combined 2 (Federal Court file nos. WAD6008/2000) native title claim area.

== Education ==
Children of school age at Bayulu attend Bayulu Community School. The school is located on Gogo Station. It caters for 125 children from K-7, all of whom are Aboriginal. Their first language is Kriol with some Gooniyandi and Walmajarri being spoken. Australian English is the children's second language.

== Governance ==
The community is managed through its incorporated body, Bayulu Community Incorporated, incorporated under the Aboriginal Councils and Associations Act 1976 on 5 November 1975.

== Town planning ==
Bayulu Layout Plan No.1 has been prepared in accordance with State Planning Policy 3.2 Aboriginal Settlements. Layout Plan No.1 was endorsed by the community on 30 March 2011 and the Western Australian Planning Commission on 14 May 2002.
