= Mallingbar community =

Community in Western Australia

Mallingbar Community
- Interactive map of Mallingbar Community
- Coordinates: 17°57′26″S 122°14′36″E
- Country: Australia
- State: Western Australia
- LGA: Shire of Broome
- Location: 0 km (0 mi) north of Broome, Western Australia

Government
  - State electorate: Kimberley
  - Federal division: Durack
- Elevation: 747 m (2,451 ft)
- Time zone: UTC+8 (AWST)
- Postcode: 6725

Mallingbar is a small Aboriginal community, located within the town of Broome in the Kimberley region of Western Australia.

== History ==
The Mallingbar Aboriginal Corporation was officially established in 1987 at the Roebuck Bay shoreline location known as Kennedy Hill. The hill is significant to indigenous people in the region, as attested by the presence of a large shell midden immediately adjacent to the community.

The community has a total of 11 dwellings that were built in 1986. Four of the houses were demolished in 2014 after being declared unfit for human habitation.

== Governance ==
The community is managed through its incorporated body, Mallingbar Aboriginal Corporation, incorporated under the Aboriginal Councils and Associations Act 1976 on 26 April 1983.

== Town planning ==
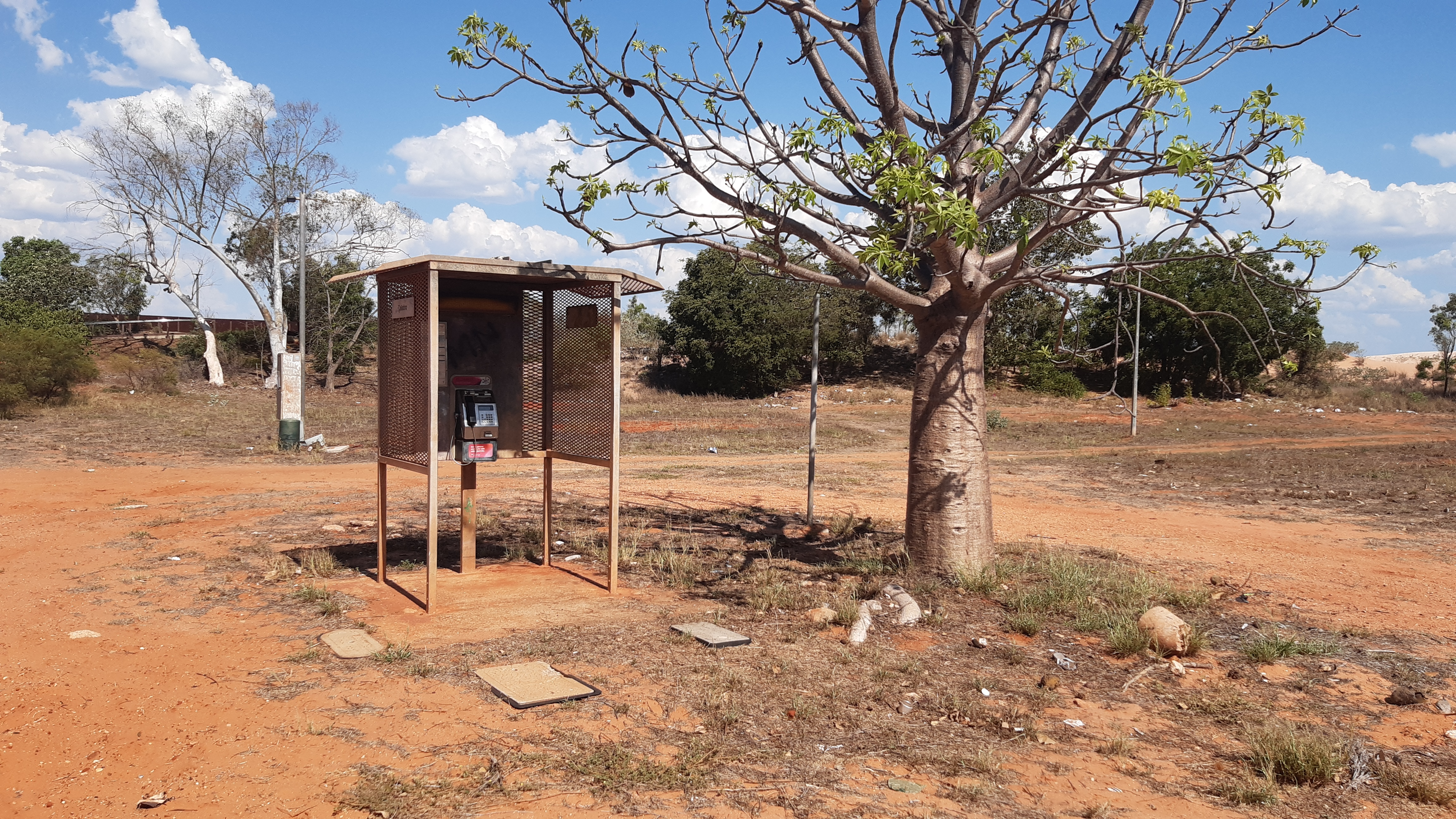
An isolated payphone remaining where the community once stood, October 2024

Mallingbar Layout Plan No.1 has been prepared in accordance with State Planning Policy 3.2 Aboriginal Settlements. The Layout Plan was endorsed by the community on 10 January 2005 and the Western Australian Planning Commission on 17 January 2005. The Layout Plan and map-set can be viewed at Planning Western Australia's official site.
