= Buttah Windee Community =

Community in Western Australia

Buttah Windee Western Australia
- Coordinates: 26.605°0′S 118.449°0′E
- Postcode(s): 6642
- Location: 5 km (3 mi) east of Meekatharra
- LGA(s): Shire of Meekatharra
- State electorate(s): North West
- Federal division(s): Durack
Mean max temp	Mean min temp	Annual rainfall
28.8 °C; 84 °F	15.8 °C; 60 °F	236.9 mm 9.3 in

Buttah Windee is a small Aboriginal community 5 km (3.1 mi) west of Meekatharra in the Mid-West region of Western Australia, within the Shire of Meekatharra.

== Native title ==
The community is located within the registered Wajarri Yamatji (WAD6033/98) native title claim area.

== Governance ==
The community is managed through its incorporated body, Buttah Windee Aboriginal Corporation, incorporated under the Aboriginal Councils and Associations Act 1976 on 16 June 1993.

== Town planning ==
Buttah Windee Layout Plan No.1 has been prepared in accordance with State Planning Policy 3.2 Aboriginal Settlements. Layout Plan No.1 was endorsed by the community on 21 March 2007 and the Western Australian Planning Commission on 13 November 2007. The Layout Plan map-set and background report are available at the Department of Planning, Lands and Heritage website.

Uranium contamination is a concern in the local water supply. A hydropanel array has been installed to provide safe drinking water.
