= Mirima community =

Community in Western Australia

Mirima Community Western Australia
- Coordinates: 15.758°S 128.739°E
- Location: 0 km (0 mi) north of Kununurra, Western Australia
- LGA(s): Shire of Wyndham-East Kimberley
- State electorate(s): Kimberley
- Federal division(s): Durack

Mirima is a small Aboriginal community, located on the edge of the town of Kununurra in the Kimberley region of Western Australia.

== History ==
In 1971, the Mirima Council was established under Catholic priest Peter Willis. The community included mainly Miriwung and Gajerong people. The ancestral lands of the Miriwung people are located near the southern part of the Ord River and therefore Miriwung people occupy the southern section of the Mirima community. The Gajerong people occupy the northern part of Mirima community.

== Native title ==
The community is covered by the determined Miriuwung–Gajerrong (Western Australia) native title claim (WC94/2).

== Governance ==
The community is managed through its incorporated body, Mirima Council Aboriginal Corporation, incorporated under the Aboriginal Councils and Associations Act 1976 on 25 November 1986.

== Town planning ==
Mirima Layout Plan No.1 has been prepared in accordance with State Planning Policy 3.2 Aboriginal Settlements. The Layout Plan was endorsed by the Western Australian Planning Commission on 15 April 2003.
