= Kutkabubba Community =

Community in Western Australia

Kutkabubba Western Australia
- Coordinates: 26.330003°0′S 120.234063°0′E
- Population: 40 (2011)
- Postcode(s): 6646
- Location: 30 km (19 mi) north of Wiluna
- LGA(s): Shire of Wiluna
- State electorate(s): Kalgoorlie
- Federal division(s): Durack
Mean max temp	Mean min temp	Annual rainfall
29.1 °C; 84 °F	14.2 °C; 58 °F	257.6 mm 10.1 in

Kutkabubba is a small Aboriginal community, located 40 km north of Wiluna, Western Australia in the Goldfields–Esperance region, within the Shire of Wiluna.

== Native title ==
The community is located within the Wiluna (WAD6164/98) native title claim area.

== Governance ==
The community is managed through its incorporated body, Kutkabubba Aboriginal Corporation (formally Kukabubba Aboriginal Corporation), incorporated under the Corporations (Aboriginal and Torres Strait Islander) Act 2006 on 16 November 1994.

== Town planning ==
Kutkabubba Layout Plan No.1 has been prepared in accordance with State Planning Policy 3.2 Aboriginal Settlements. Layout Plan No.1 is yet to be endorsed by the community.
