= Mulga Queen Community =

Community in Western Australia

Mulga Queen
- Town
- Coordinates: 27.557°0′S 122.041°0′E
- Country: Australia
- State: Western Australia
- LGA: Shire of Laverton
- Location: 150 km (93 mi) north west of Laverton

Government
  - State electorate: Kalgoorlie
  - Federal division: O'Connor
- Postcode: 6440

Mulga Queen is a medium-sized Aboriginal community, located 150 km north west of Laverton in the Goldfields-Esperance region of Western Australia, within the Shire of Laverton.

== History ==
The permanent buildings making up Mulga Queen were established in the mid-1980s. The settlement originally came about as a result of gold discoveries in the region in the late 1900s and the arrival of prospectors. These events and increasing contact with Europeans were accompanied by a breakdown of the traditional lifestyle of the Aboriginal people living in the area. Later a food depot was established by the government and Mulga Queen became established as a semi permanent camping ground for Aboriginal people.

== Governance ==
The community is managed through its incorporated body, Nurra Kurramunoo Aboriginal Corporation, incorporated under the Aboriginal Councils and Associations Act 1976 on 9 September 1987.

== Town planning ==
Mulga Queen Layout Plan No.1 has been prepared in accordance with State Planning Policy 3.2 Aboriginal Settlements. Layout Plan No. was endorsed by the community on 8 September 2001 and the Western Australian Planning Commission on 18 June 2002.
