= Mud Springs =

Mud Springs may refer to:

- El Dorado, California
- Richardson Springs, California
- An early settlement that preceded San Dimas, California was called Mud Springs.
- Mud Spring (Antelope Valley), California
- Mud Springs Station Archeological District, Nebraska
- Mud Springs Community, Western Australia
