= Ardyaloon, Western Australia =

Community in Western Australia

Ardyaloon
- Town
- Interactive map of Ardyaloon
- Coordinates: 16°26′47″S 123°03′38″E
- Country: Australia
- State: Western Australia
- LGA: Shire of Broome
- Location: 1,870 km (1,160 mi) N of Perth; 114 km (71 mi) NW of Derby; 189 km (117 mi) NE of Broome

Government
  - State electorate: Kimberley
  - Federal division: Durack
- Elevation: 7 m (23 ft)

Population
  - Total: 325 (UCL 2021)
- Time zone: UTC+8 (AWST)
- Mean max temp: 32.4 °C (90.3 °F)
- Mean min temp: 21.2 °C (70.2 °F)
- Annual rainfall: 818.7 mm (32.23 in)

Ardyaloon or One Arm Point, also known as Bardi, is an Aboriginal Australian community town on the Dampier Peninsula, in the Kimberley region of Western Australia. It is located 2,446 kilometres (1,520 mi) north of Perth and the closest populated town is Derby. At the 2016 census, Bardi had a population of 365.

The Bardi Ardyaloon hatchery has successfully produced trochus shell at One Arm Point for a number of years, including reseeding the reef surrounding the area.

The area is home to the Bardi people.

According to the local Indigenous people, the name One Arm Point originated from the tale of an unfortunate pearler who had an accident with dynamite while attempting to catch fish using explosives in the bay.

== Native title ==
The community is located within the Bardi Jawi native title determination area, determined by the Federal Court of Australia on 30 November 2005. (Federal Court file nos. WAD49/1998, WAD6001/2004) It is managed through its incorporated body, Ardyaloon Incorporated, registered under the Associations Incorporations Act 1987 and the Aboriginal Communities Act 1979.

The town plan follows the Ardyaloon Community Layout Plan No.2 has been prepared in accordance with State Planning Strategy 3.2 Aboriginal Settlements. Layout Plan No.2 was endorsed by the community on 15 September 2004 and the Western Australia Planning Commission on 15 February 2005, with various amendments up until 2017.

== Town planning ==
Ardyaloon Layout Plan No.2 was prepared in accordance with State Planning Policy 3.2 and was endorsed by the community in 2004 and the Western Australian Planning Commission in 2005.

== Climate ==
Ardyaloon has a tropical savanna climate bordering on a tropical semi-arid climate (Köppen: Aw/BSh); with a short wet season from December to March and a very long dry season from April to November. Climate data was sourced from the nearest weather station at Cygnet Bay. The area is very sunny, experiencing 167.7 clear days and only 67.5 cloudy days per annum. Extreme temperatures have ranged from 42.0 °C (107.6 °F) on 8 November 2003 to 6.3 °C (43.3 °F) on 1 July 1994. The wettest recorded day was 27 December 2017 with 291.5 mm (11.48 in) of rainfall.

Climate data for Cygnet Bay (16.45°S 123.01°E) (7 m (23 ft) AMSL) (1963-2025)
Month	Jan	Feb	Mar	Apr	May	Jun	Jul	Aug	Sep	Oct	Nov	Dec	Year
Record high °C (°F)	40.6 (105.1)	38.3 (100.9)	39.5 (103.1)	39.1 (102.4)	37.1 (98.8)	33.4 (92.1)	34.3 (93.7)	35.5 (95.9)	38.9 (102.0)	40.0 (104.0)	42.0 (107.6)	40.1 (104.2)	42.0 (107.6)
Mean daily maximum °C (°F)	33.7 (92.7)	33.3 (91.9)	33.7 (92.7)	33.6 (92.5)	31.0 (87.8)	28.7 (83.7)	28.1 (82.6)	29.8 (85.6)	32.7 (90.9)	34.2 (93.6)	35.4 (95.7)	34.7 (94.5)	32.4 (90.4)
Mean daily minimum °C (°F)	25.7 (78.3)	25.4 (77.7)	24.8 (76.6)	22.6 (72.7)	19.3 (66.7)	16.7 (62.1)	14.7 (58.5)	15.0 (59.0)	18.2 (64.8)	21.7 (71.1)	24.3 (75.7)	25.7 (78.3)	21.2 (70.1)
Record low °C (°F)	19.0 (66.2)	20.0 (68.0)	17.5 (63.5)	12.8 (55.0)	9.8 (49.6)	7.2 (45.0)	6.3 (43.3)	7.2 (45.0)	10.4 (50.7)	13.5 (56.3)	17.5 (63.5)	18.6 (65.5)	6.3 (43.3)
Average precipitation mm (inches)	246.5 (9.70)	194.4 (7.65)	161.3 (6.35)	42.4 (1.67)	38.6 (1.52)	18.7 (0.74)	9.7 (0.38)	0.9 (0.04)	1.5 (0.06)	2.3 (0.09)	6.6 (0.26)	98.6 (3.88)	818.7 (32.23)
Average precipitation days (≥ 0.2 mm)	11.7	10.5	9.2	3.0	2.2	1.1	0.5	0.1	0.2	0.6	1.1	5.4	45.6
Average afternoon relative humidity (%)	64	68	64	56	54	54	50	45	45	49	52	58	55
Average dew point °C (°F)	24.4 (75.9)	24.9 (76.8)	24.6 (76.3)	22.2 (72.0)	19.0 (66.2)	16.7 (62.1)	15.5 (59.9)	14.9 (58.8)	16.8 (62.2)	20.0 (68.0)	22.0 (71.6)	23.3 (73.9)	20.4 (68.6)
Source: Bureau of Meteorology (1963-2025)

== See also ==
- List of Aboriginal communities in Western Australia
