= Yiyili Community =

Community in Western Australia

Yiyili
- Town
- Interactive map of Yiyili
- Coordinates: 18°43′S 126°45′E
- Country: Australia
- State: Western Australia
- LGA: Shire of Halls Creek
- Location: 110 km (68 mi) west of Halls Creek, Western Australia

Government
  - State electorate: Kimberley
  - Federal division: Durack
- Elevation: 422 m (1,385 ft)
- Postcode: 6770
- Mean max temp: 33.6 °C (92.5 °F)
- Mean min temp: 20.0 °C (68.0 °F)
- Annual rainfall: 557.4 mm (21.94 in)

Yiyili is a small Aboriginal community, located 110 kilometres (68 mi) west of Halls Creek in the Kimberley region of Western Australia, within the Shire of Halls Creek.

== History ==
Yiyili Community was established in 1981 with the purchase of Louisa Downs Station by the Louis Downs Pastoral Aboriginal Corporation. The community was developed on land excised from the station pastoral lease. Louisa Station is still owned and operated by Yiyili community members under the Louisa Downs Pastoral Aboriginal Corporation.

== Native title ==
The community is located within the registered Gooniyandi Combined 2 (WAD6008/00) native title claim area.

== Town planning ==
Yiyili Layout Plan No.2 was prepared in accordance with State Planning Policy 3.2 Aboriginal Settlements and was endorsed by the community in 2010. The layout plan map-set and background report can be viewed at the Planning Western Australia website.

== Education ==
Children of school age at Yiyili attend the Yiyili Community School. The school caters for students in kindergarten to Year 10 from Yiyili and the surrounding outstations of Ganinyi, Girriyoowa, Goolgaradah, Kurinyjarn, and Rocky Springs.

In 2010 there were 72 students enrolled. A daily bus service operated by the school collects students from other nearby communities including Moongardie 30 kilometres (19 mi) distant. The school provides lunch for students. Students who progress beyond Year 10 attend boarding school in Darwin, Northern Territory and other larger towns.

== Governance ==
The community is managed through its incorporated body, Yiyili Community Indigenous Corporation (formally Yiyili Community Aboriginal Corporation), incorporated under the Aboriginal Councils and Associations Act 1976 on 27 November 1981.
