= Wurrenranginy Community =

Community in Western Australia

Wurreranginy Western Australia
- Coordinates: 17.276°0′S 128.051°0′E
- Location: 30 km (19 mi) south of Warmun
- LGA(s): Shire of Halls Creek
- State electorate(s): Kimberley
- Federal division(s): Durack
Mean max temp	Mean min temp	Annual rainfall
33.6 °C; 92 °F	20.00 °C; 68 °F	557.4 mm 21.9 in

Wurreranginy (also known as Frog Hollow) is a small Aboriginal community, located 30 km south of Warmun in the Kimberley region of Western Australia, within the Shire of Halls Creek.

== History ==
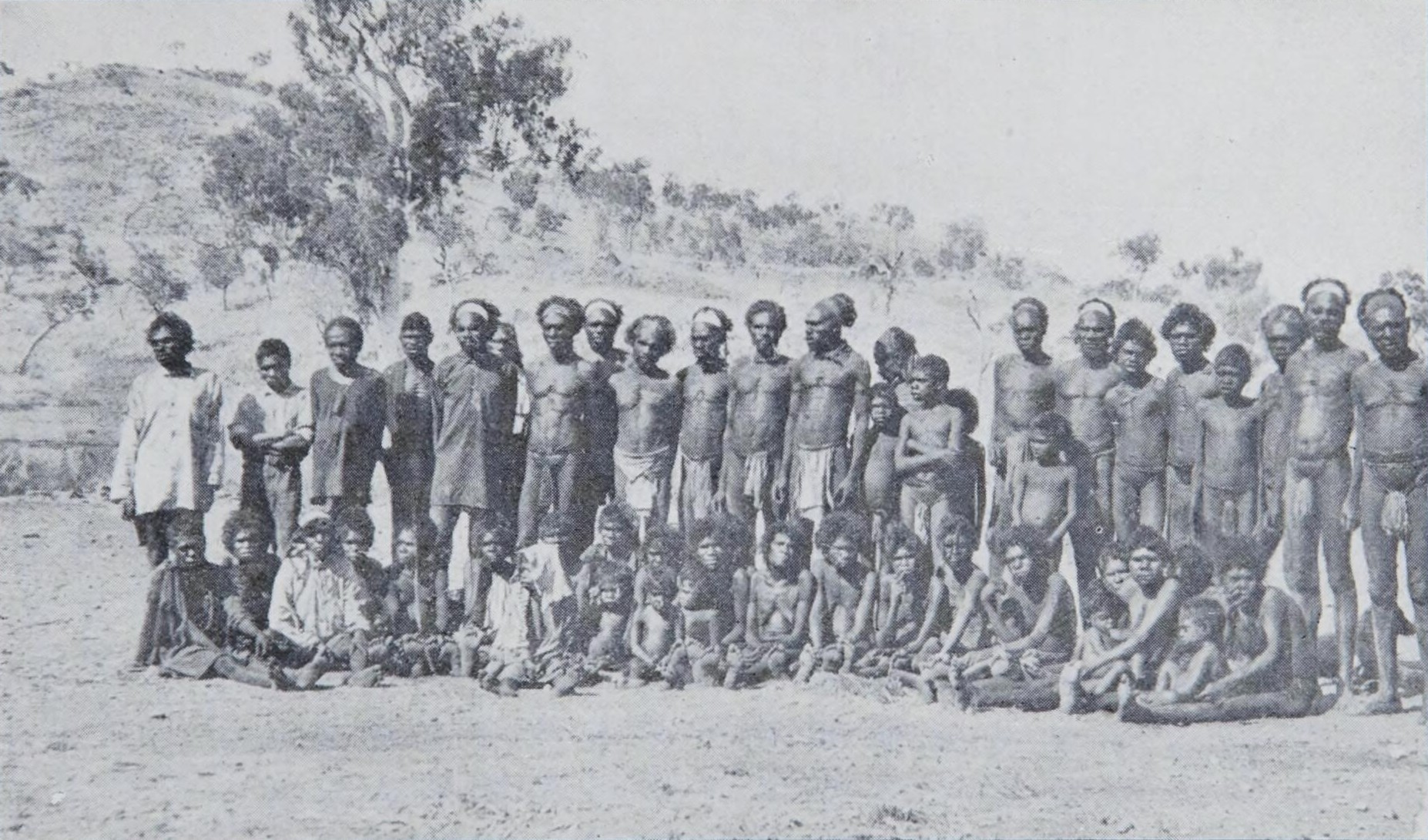
Aboriginal Australians at Frog Hollow c. 1912

The original residents of Frog Hollow moved to Wurreranginy in 1981 from Guda Guda, near Wyndham, where they had gone to live after being expelled from cattle stations in the early 1970s. The people of Wurreranginy are Kija speakers with a mixture of adults, pensioners and children being present in the community.

== Education ==
Children of school age at Wurreranginy attend the Purnululu Aboriginal Independent Community School. The school enrols approximately 50 students in years K-10 and hosts an Early Learning Centre for children aged 0–3.

== Town planning ==
Wurrenraginy Layout Plan No.1 was prepared in accordance with State Planning Policy 3.2 Aboriginal Settlements and was endorsed by the community and the Western Australian Planning Commission in 2005. The layout plan map-set and background report can be viewed at Planning Western Australia's website.

== Governance ==
The community is managed through its incorporated body, Wurreranginy Aboriginal Corporation, incorporated under the Aboriginal Councils and Associations Act 1976 on 28 May 1986.
