= Parnpajinya community =

Community in Western Australia

Parnpajinya Western Australia
- Coordinates: 23.341°0′S 119.743°0′E
- Elevation: 47 m (154 ft)
- Location: 2 km (1 mi) north-east of Newman
- LGA(s): Shire of East Pilbara

Parnpajinya is a small Aboriginal community, located proximate to Newman in the Pilbara region of Western Australia, within the Shire of East Pilbara.

== Background ==
The community is accessed via a sealed road from Great Northern Highway, approximately 2 km north-east of Newman. The estimated population of Parnpajinya is 40 people. The residents generally identify themselves as being either Martu or Niabali people. The population fluctuates considerably due to its location proximate to Newman.

== Town planning ==
Parnpajinya Layout Plan No.1 has been prepared in accordance with State Planning Policy 3.2 Aboriginal Settlements, and was endorsed by the community on 8 August 2002 and the Western Australian Planning Commission on 25 January 2006.
