= Frog Hollow =

Frog Hollow may refer to:

- Wurrenranginy Community, Western Australia
- Frog Hollow, Hartford, Connecticut, a city neighborhood
- Frog Hollow, a community in Elizabeth, New Jersey, United States

== See also ==
- Frogs Hollow, New South Wales, Australia
