= Wakathuni Community =

Community in Western Australia

Wakathuni Western Australia
- Coordinates: 22.865°S 117.842°E
- Postcode(s): 6751
- Elevation: 747 m (2,451 ft)
- Location: 20 km (12 mi) south east of Tom Price, Western Australia
- LGA(s): Shire of Ashburton
- State electorate(s): Central Kimberley-Pilbara
- Federal division(s): Durack
Mean max temp	Mean min temp	Annual rainfall
33.3 °C; 92 °F	18.7 °C; 66 °F	280.8 mm 11.1 in

Wakathuni is a small Aboriginal community, located 20 km south east of Tom Price in the Pilbara region of Western Australia, within the Shire of Ashburton.

== Native title ==
The community is located within the registered Yinhawangka Part A (WAD340/2010) native title claim area.

== Governance ==
The community is managed through its incorporated body, Wakuthuni Aboriginal Corporation, incorporated under the Aboriginal Councils and Associations Act 1976 on 28 November 1991.

== Town planning ==
Wakathuni Layout Plan No.1 has been prepared in accordance with State Planning Strategy 3.2 Aboriginal Settlements. Layout Plan No.1 was endorsed by on 6 July 2001 and the Western Australian Planning Commission on 2 October 2001.
