= Waterbank, Western Australia =

Place in Western Australia

Waterbank
- Suburb
- Coordinates: 17.79318°S 122.23405°E
- Country: Australia
- State: Western Australia
- LGA: Shire of Broome; Shire of Derby–West Kimberley

Government
  - State electorate: Kimberley
  - Federal division: Durack

Area
  - Total: 6,634 km^{2} (2,561 sq mi)

Population
  - Total: 110 (SAL 2021)
- Postcode: 6725

Waterbank is a locality in the Kimberley region of Western Australia.
