= Wuggubun Community =

Community in Western Australia

Wuggubun Western Australia
- Coordinates: 15.956003°0′S 128.37894°0′E
- Postcode(s): 6743
- Elevation: 47 m (154 ft)
- Location: 40 km (25 mi) west of Kununurra
- LGA(s): Shire of Wyndham-East Kimberley
- State electorate(s): Kimberley
- Federal division(s): Durack
Mean max temp	Mean min temp	Annual rainfall
35.0 °C; 95 °F	21.6 °C; 71 °F	790.7 mm 31.1 in

Wuggubun is a small Aboriginal community, located in the Kimberley region of Western Australia, within the Shire of Wyndham-East Kimberley.

== Governance ==
The community is managed through its incorporated body, Wuggubun Aboriginal Corporation, incorporated under the Aboriginal Councils and Associations Act 1976 on 8 August 1990.

== Town planning ==
Wuggubun Layout Plan No.1 has been prepared in accordance with State Planning Policy 3.2 Aboriginal Settlements. Layout Plan No.1 is yet to be endorsed by the community. As such the Layout Plan exists only as a draft.
