= Kurrawang community =

Community in Western Australia

Kurrawang Aboriginal Christian Community Incorporated
- Town
- Coordinates: 30.8297°S 121.3306°E
- Country: Australia
- State: Western Australia
- LGA: Shire of Coolgardie
- Location: 574 km (357 mi) ENE of Perth; 15 km (9.3 mi) SW of Coolgardie
- Established: 1910

Government
  - State electorate: Eyre
  - Federal division: O'Connor
- Elevation: 369 m (1,211 ft)
- Postcode: 6430

Kurrawang is a medium-sized Aboriginal community, located 12 km south-west of Kalgoorlie in the state of Western Australia, within the Goldfields-Esperance region of Western Australia.

== History ==
Kurrawang was established as a mission settlement in 1953 on a Crown Land Title reserve. During the 1960s Kurrawang set up dormitories for children. In the 1970s the dormitories were replaced with a detached housing accommodation system. In 1984 mission control was replaced by a community based executive committee. In March 1995 the Kurrawang Aboriginal Christian Community was issued with the title to land in freehold.

== Town planning ==
Kurrawang Layout Plan No.2 has been prepared in accordance with State Planning Policy 3.2 Aboriginal Settlements. Layout Plan No.2 was endorsed by the community on 7 February 2006 and the Western Australian Planning Commission on 21 March 2006. The Layout Plan map-set and background report can be viewed at Planning Western Australia's website.
