= Wandanooka community =

Community in Western Australia

Ngunulum Western Australia
- Coordinates: 28.383°0′S 115.611°0′E
- Location: 130 km (81 mi) north east of Geraldton
- LGA(s): City of Greater Geraldton

Wandanooka is a small Aboriginal community in the Mid-West region of Western Australia, within the City of Greater Geraldton.

== Native title ==
The community is part of the Mallewa-Wadjury joint native title claim over the Tallering Peak Iron Ore area.

== Governance ==
The community is managed through its incorporated body, the Wandanooka Aboriginal Corporation, which was incorporated under the Commonwealth Aboriginal Councils and Associations Act 1976 on 28 July 1992.

== Town planning ==
Wandanooka town plan
