= Ngurrawaana Community =

Community in Western Australia

Ngurrawaana Western Australia
- Coordinates: 21.412°S 116.985°E
- Location: 100 km (62 mi) south east of Karratha, Western Australia
- LGA(s): Shire of Ashburton
- State electorate(s): Central Kimberley-Pilbara
- Federal division(s): Durack

Ngurrawaana is a medium-sized Aboriginal community, located 100 km south east of Karratha in the Pilbara region of Western Australia, within the Shire of Ashburton.

The Ngurrawaana community is situated in the heart of Yindjibarndi country, providing a central location for the continuing activities associated with the cultural, spiritual and religious maintenance of the significant sites and locations within Yindjibarndi territory.

== Native title ==
The community is located within the determined Ngarluma/Yindjibarndi (WAD6017/96) native title claim area.

== Education ==
Children of school age at Ngurrawaana community attend the Ngurrawaana Remote Community School. The school teaches up to twenty children, with the principal and one of the school teachers living on site.

== Governance ==
The community is managed through its incorporated body, Ngurawaana Group (Aboriginal Corporation), incorporated under the Aboriginal Councils and Associations Act 1976 on 10 March 1982.

== Town planning ==
Ngurawaana Draft Layout Plan No.1 is not yet endorsed by the community and exists only in draft format.
