= Innawonga Community =

Community in Western Australia

Innawonga Western Australia
- Coordinates: 23.045°S 117.8894°E
- Postcode(s): 6751
- Elevation: 747 m (2,451 ft)
- Location: 40 km (25 mi) southeast of Tom Price, Western Australia
- LGA(s): Shire of Ashburton
- State electorate(s): Central Kimberley-Pilbara
- Federal division(s): Durack
Mean max temp	Mean min temp	Annual rainfall
33.3 °C; 92 °F	18.7 °C; 66 °F	280.8 mm 11.1 in

Innawonga is a small Aboriginal community 40 kilometres (25 mi) southeast of Tom Price in the Pilbara region of Western Australia, within the Shire of Ashburton.

== Native title ==
The community is located within the registered Yinhawangka Part A (WAD340/2010) native title claim area.

== Governance ==
The community is managed through its incorporated body, Innawonga Aboriginal Corporation, incorporated under the Aboriginal Councils and Associations Act 1976 on 6 February 1990.

== Town planning ==
Innwonga Draft Layout Plan No.1 is not yet endorsed by the community and exists only in draft format.
