= Halls Creek, Western Australia =

Town in the Kimberley region of Western Australia

Halls Creek
- Town
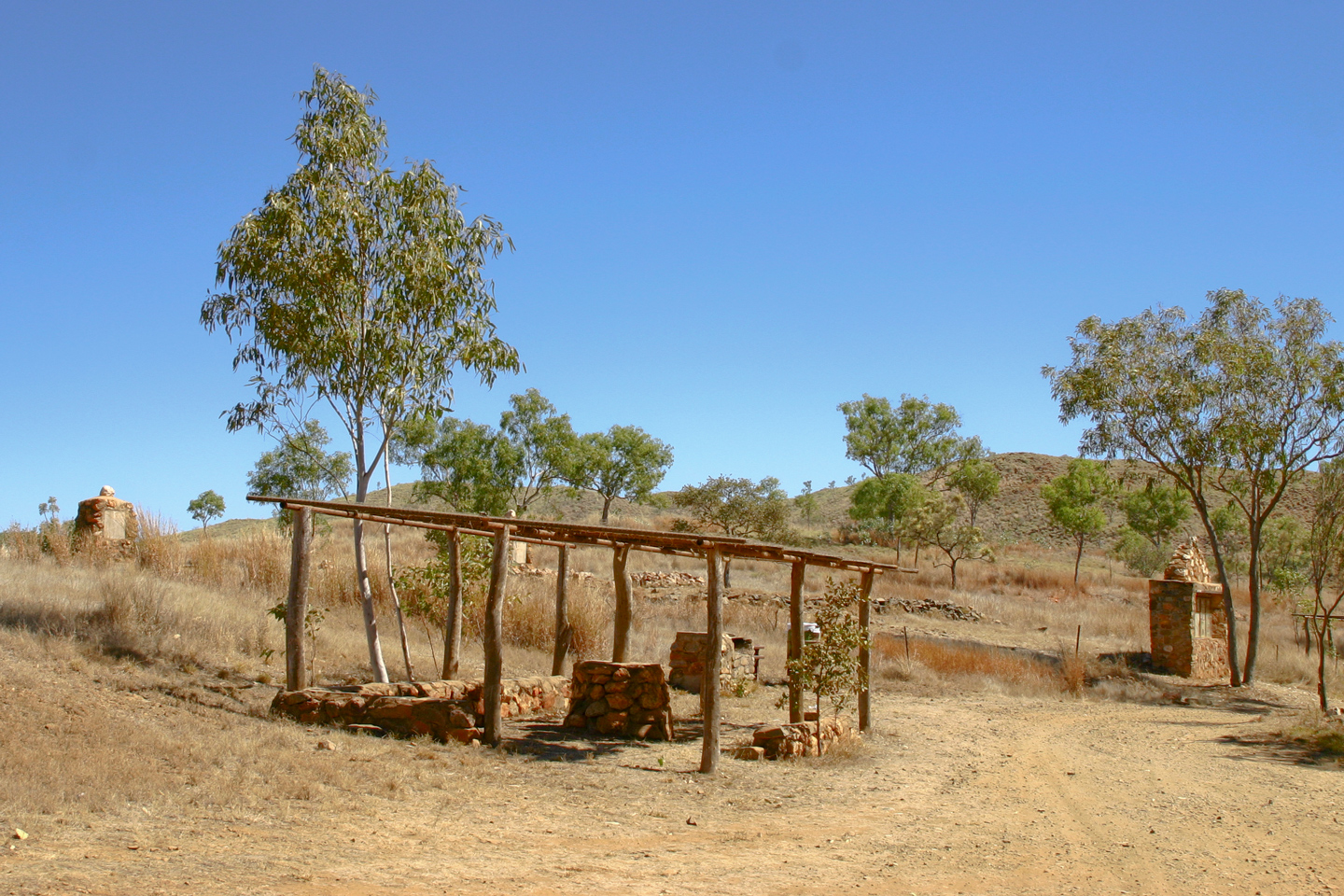
- Ruins of Old Halls Creek

- Interactive map of Halls Creek
- Coordinates: 18.23°S 127.67°E
- Country: Australia
- State: Western Australia
- LGA: Shire of Halls Creek
- Location: 366 km (227 mi) from Kununurra; 546 km (339 mi) from Derby; 2,715 km (1,687 mi) from Perth; 1,186 km (737 mi) from Darwin
- Established: 1887/1949

Government
  - State electorate: Kimberley
  - Federal division: Durack

Area
  - Total: 44 km^{2} (17 sq mi)
- Elevation: 422 m (1,385 ft)

Population
  - Total: 1,605 (UCL 2021)
- Postcode: 6770
- Mean max temp: 33.6 °C (92.5 °F)
- Mean min temp: 20.0 °C (68.0 °F)
- Annual rainfall: 571.5 mm (22.50 in)

Halls Creek is a town situated in the east Kimberley region of Western Australia. It is located between the towns of Fitzroy Crossing and Turkey Creek (Warmun) on the Great Northern Highway. It is the only sizable town for 600 kilometres (370 mi) on the Highway.

Halls Creek is also the northern end of the Canning Stock Route, which runs 1,850 kilometres (1,150 mi) through the Great Sandy Desert until the southern end of the route at Wiluna.

The town functions as a major hub for the local Indigenous population and as a support centre for cattle stations in the area.

Halls Creek is the administration centre for Halls Creek Shire Council.

== History ==
The land now known as Halls Creek has been occupied for thousands of years by Aboriginal peoples. The land is crossed by songlines and trading paths stretching from the coasts to the deserts, some passing near the modern town. The story of that long occupation remains alive today and it is revealed in the culture of the Jaru, Kija, Kukatja, Walmajarri, Gooniyandi and other Indigenous people who live in Halls Creek Shire.

Late in the 19th century, Europeans arrived, searching for land for cattle and sheep, as well as minerals. On Christmas Day 1885, prospector Charlie Hall found a 870-gram (28-troy-ounce) gold nugget at a site that would eventually be named after him. News of the discovery drew more than 15,000 people to what is now Old Halls Creek to try their luck. It proved a barren land for these people, and some graves can be found in Old Town's small cemetery.

The gold rush lasted less than three months, and Halls Creek became a trading centre for cattle stations, Aboriginal communities and miners who stayed there. The post office with its telegraph line that terminated here, the police station, government office, racecourse and stores gave the town a purpose. In 1918 the Australian Inland Mission built a hospital and the old town continued, with few inhabitants and little water.

In 1948, an airfield was built near the site of the present town, and over the next decade, the old town moved nearer to this new site. Except for the police station, which was finally relocated in 1961, the old town was abandoned by 1954.

The nearby settlements known as Chinaman's Garden (Yarrunga) and Wangu Outstation (Flora Valley Station) were funded by the federal government as outstations during the 1980s.

== Crime ==
Halls Creek has a very high crime rate and has grown quite famous in more recent years for its youth crime and large, violent, public brawls.

There are alcohol restrictions within Halls Creek. In May 2009, the state Director of Liquor Licensing imposed a "prohibition on the sale of packaged liquor with an alcohol content greater than 2.7 per cent from licensed premises" in the town.

== Tourism ==
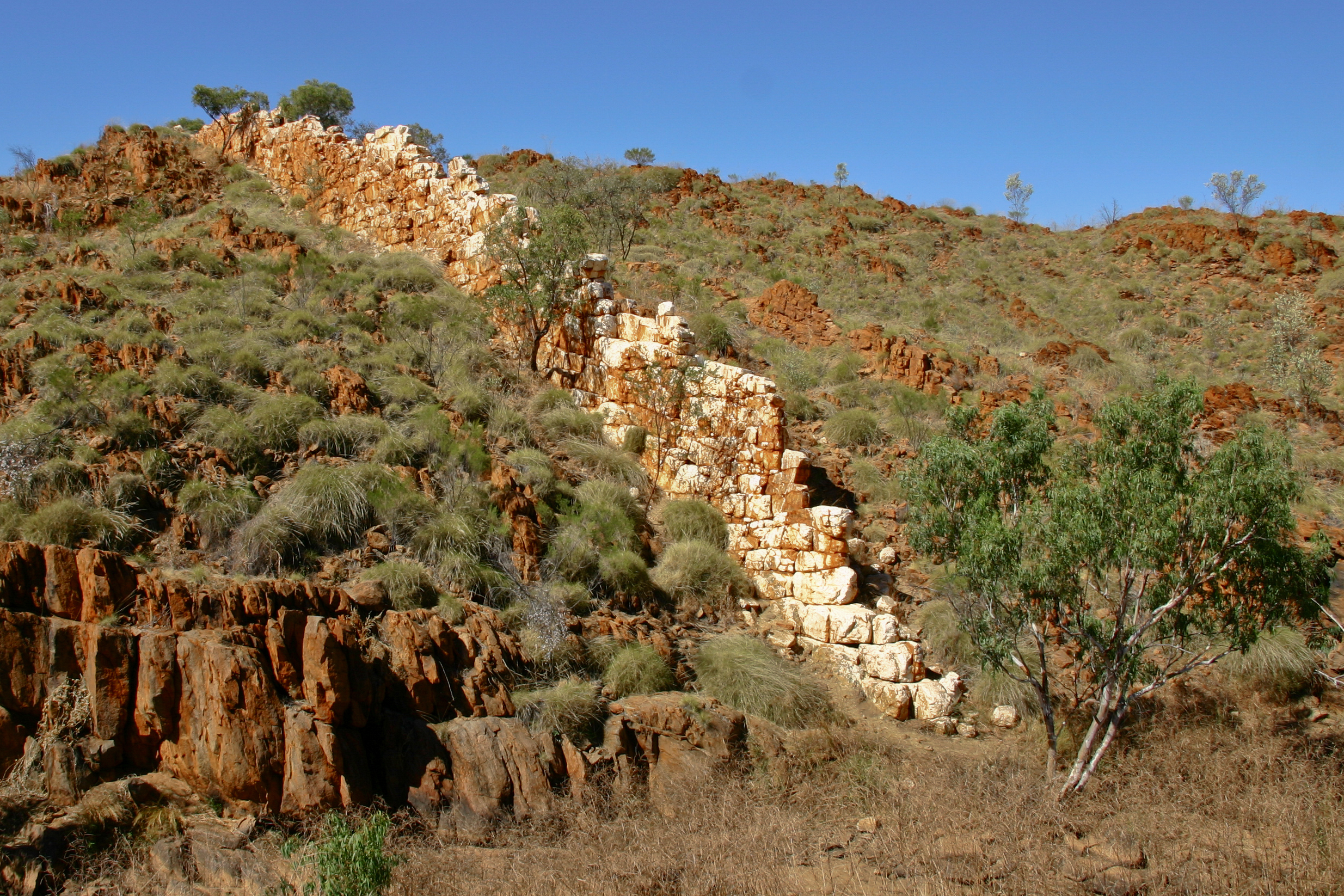
The so-called "China Wall"

For tourists, there are several nearby attractions such as:

- China Wall
- Old Halls Creek
- Palm Springs
- Saw Pit Gorge
- Duncan Road
- Wolfe Creek Crater, 200 kilometres (120 mi) to the south on the Tanami Road
- Purnululu National Park (the Bungle Bungles), 120 km to the north.
- Canning Stock Route

Tourism information is available.

=== Indigenous Australian art ===
Many talented artists produce Indigenous Australian art live in Halls Creek and the surrounding communities. Some artists sell directly, and there is also an art centre in town, where buyers can meet the artists and purchase works.

- Yarliyil Art Centre, Halls Creek

Permits are required in some areas.

== Impact craters ==
Aside from the well known and well preserved Wolfe Creek Crater, averaging about 875 metres (2,871 ft) in diameter, nearby there is also Goat Paddock crater, 7 kilometres (4.3 mi) in diameter and 106 kilometres (66 mi) west-southwest of Halls Creek, and Piccaninny crater, 7 kilometres (4.3 mi) in diameter, within the Purnululu (Bungle Bungle) National Park. Near the other end of the Tanami Road in the Northern Territory, over 1,000 kilometres (620 mi) away from Halls Creek, is Gosses Bluff crater, with the 5 kilometres (3.1 mi) diameter, 180 metres (590 ft) high crater-like feature, now exposed, being interpreted as the eroded relic of the crater's central uplift.

== Indigenous population ==
In the 2016 Census, there were 1,546 people in Halls Creek. Aboriginal and Torres Strait Islander people made up 66.9% of the population.

It is home to the Indigenous Djaru and Gija peoples, as well as some Tjurabalan peoples from the desert to the south of the town. Indigenous people have lived in the region for at least 30,000 years.

"Aboriginal people in Halls Creek are predominantly Jaru and Kija peoples. Many residents celebrate both Jaru and Kija heritage. There are also significant numbers of Gooniyandi people from further east, Walmajarri from the south-east and Kukatja people originally from the desert country to the south. Over the years, other Aboriginal people from nearby groups have moved to Halls Creek. These include the Gurindji and the Walpiri from the east, the Ngardi from the south-east and Malngin from the north-east."

== Climate ==
Halls Creek has a warm semi-arid climate (BSh according to the Köppen climate classification) with a dry season and a wet season. The temperature is warm year-round, with July, the coolest month, having an average high of 27.2 °C (81.0 °F) and an average low of 12.6 °C (54.7 °F). November has the highest average high of 38.3 °C (100.9 °F), while December has the highest average low at 24.7 °C (76.5 °F). The highest temperature ever recorded was 45.0 °C (113.0 °F) on 8 November 1988, and the lowest recorded temperature was 0.2 °C (32.4 °F) on 18 July 1945. Halls Creek has never recorded a temperature below the freezing point.

Halls Creek has two distinct seasons, the wet season (November - March) and the dry season (April - October). Permanent surface water sources are scarce during the dry season. During the wet season, Halls Creek is often cut off due to flooding; water levels can rise and fall very rapidly.

Halls Creek receives 571.5 millimetres (22.50 in) of precipitation annually. There is a wet season from December to March and a dry season for the rest of the year. The hottest time of year is just before the wet season and at the start of it, from October to January. The dry season is cooler and has a higher diurnal temperature variation. January is the wettest month, receiving 155.2 millimetres (6.11 in) of rain on average. August is the driest month, receiving only 2.1 millimetres (0.083 in) of rainfall. August has the fewest precipitation days with 0.5, and January has the most with 13.5 days. Humidity is low year-round, but it is higher during the wet season. Halls Creek receives 3439 hours of sunshine annually, with July having the most sunshine and February having the least.

Climate data for Halls Creek (1944–2018)
Month	Jan	Feb	Mar	Apr	May	Jun	Jul	Aug	Sep	Oct	Nov	Dec	Year
Record high °C (°F)	44.9 (112.8)	43.3 (109.9)	42.2 (108.0)	40.3 (104.5)	37.5 (99.5)	35.0 (95.0)	34.4 (93.9)	37.2 (99.0)	40.2 (104.4)	43.8 (110.8)	45.0 (113.0)	44.9 (112.8)	45.0 (113.0)
Mean daily maximum °C (°F)	36.7 (98.1)	35.6 (96.1)	35.4 (95.7)	33.9 (93.0)	30.0 (86.0)	27.3 (81.1)	27.3 (81.1)	30.0 (86.0)	34.2 (93.6)	37.2 (99.0)	38.3 (100.9)	37.8 (100.0)	33.6 (92.5)
Mean daily minimum °C (°F)	24.3 (75.7)	23.7 (74.7)	22.8 (73.0)	20.4 (68.7)	16.7 (62.1)	13.7 (56.7)	12.7 (54.9)	14.7 (58.5)	19.0 (66.2)	22.7 (72.9)	24.5 (76.1)	24.8 (76.6)	20.0 (68.0)
Record low °C (°F)	15.6 (60.1)	17.7 (63.9)	15.6 (60.1)	11.0 (51.8)	7.1 (44.8)	3.0 (37.4)	0.2 (32.4)	4.9 (40.8)	8.3 (46.9)	12.8 (55.0)	13.5 (56.3)	15.6 (60.1)	0.2 (32.4)
Average rainfall mm (inches)	159.8 (6.29)	143.5 (5.65)	82.9 (3.26)	21.4 (0.84)	12.7 (0.50)	5.1 (0.20)	6.0 (0.24)	2.1 (0.08)	4.3 (0.17)	17.7 (0.70)	39.5 (1.56)	83.0 (3.27)	575.4 (22.65)
Average rainy days	13.6	12.8	8.3	2.6	2.0	0.9	0.8	0.5	0.9	3.3	6.6	11.0	63.3
Average afternoon relative humidity (%)	36	40	33	25	26	25	21	18	16	17	22	29	26
Average dew point °C (°F)	19 (66)	18 (64)	17 (63)	10 (50)	6 (43)	4 (39)	1 (34)	0 (32)	2 (36)	6 (43)	12 (54)	17 (63)	9 (49)
Mean monthly sunshine hours	251.1	221.2	269.7	297.0	272.8	297.0	322.4	319.3	315.0	306.9	300.0	266.6	3,439
Mean daily sunshine hours	10.5	10.2	9.1	9.5	9.4	9.0	8.1	9.9	9.9	9.8	9.6	10.2	9.6
Source 1: Australian Bureau of Meteorology
Source 2: Time and Date (dewpoints 2005-2015) Weather Atlas (sun hours)

== Heavy rare earth mine ==
As of November 2018 the Browns Range Project pilot plant—160 km south east of the township near the Kundat Djaru Community—is producing 50 tonnes (49 long tons) per annum of dysprosium.

Historical population
Year	Pop.	±%
1986	315	—
1991	479	+52.1%
1996	382	−20.3%
2001	1,264	+230.9%
2006	1,211	−4.2%
2011	1,443	+19.2%
2016	1,546	+7.1%
2021	1,605	+3.8%
Source: Shire of Halls Creek; ABS (Urban Centres and Localities)

== See also ==
- Halls Creek Airport
- Carnegie expedition of 1896
