= Shire of Derby–West Kimberley =

Coordinates: 17°23′S 123°41′E

Shire of Derby/West Kimberley
- Local government area
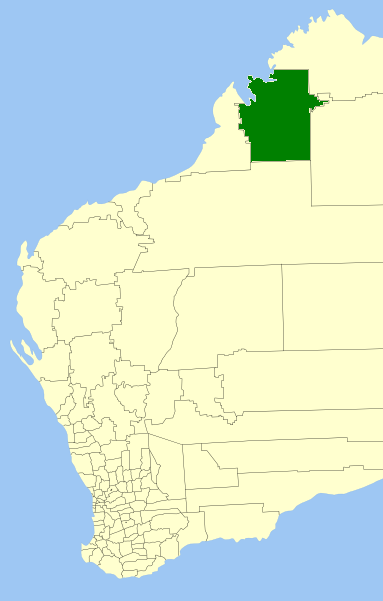
- Location in Western Australia

- Interactive map of Shire of Derby/West Kimberley
- Country: Australia
- State: Western Australia
- Region: Kimberley
- Established: 1884
- Council seat: Derby

Government
  - President: Peter McCumstie
  - State electorate: Kimberley
  - Federal division: Durack

Area
  - Total: 104,080 km^{2} (40,190 sq mi)

Population
  - Total: 7,075 (LGA 2021)
- Website: Shire of Derby/West Kimberley
LGAs around Shire of Derby/West Kimberley
Cocos	Wyndham-East Kimberley	Wyndham-East Kimberley
Broome	Shire of Derby/West Kimberley	Halls Creek
Broome	East Pilbara	Halls Creek

The Shire of Derby–West Kimberley is one of four local government areas in the Kimberley region of northern Western Australia, covering an area of 104,080 square kilometres (40,186 sq mi), most of which is sparsely populated. The Shire's population as at the 2021 census was 7075, with most residing in the major towns of Derby, which is also the Shire's seat of government, and Fitzroy Crossing. There are also around 70 Aboriginal communities within the Shire.

The major industries of the shire include cattle for export, fishing, and tourism.

== History ==
It was established as the West Kimberley Road District on 10 February 1887. The first Broome Road District separated on 15 November 1901 and the Municipality of Broome separated on 30 September 1904, but were re-absorbed on 24 July 1908 and 13 December 1918 respectively; the Broome area then again separated as the second Broome Road District (now the Shire of Broome) on 20 December 1918.

It was declared a shire and named the Shire of West Kimberley with effect from 1 July 1961 following the passage of the Local Government Act 1960, which reformed all remaining road districts into shires. It was renamed the Shire of Derby–West Kimberley on 11 June 1983.

The area is home to many large cattle stations, One of the first established was Yeeda Station, taken up in 1880 by the Murray Squatting Company composed of William Paterson, G. Paterson, H. Cornish and Alexander Richardson.

The lease for Fossil Downs Station had been issued in 1883 to Dan MacDonald, for an area of 100 square miles (259 km^{2}) at the junction of the Margaret and Fitzroy Rivers. The station was established in 1886 when cattle arrived from the eastern states to stock the lease.

Other properties in the area include Mount Barnett Station, Cherrabun, Charnley River Station, Glenroy, Gogo, Kimberley Downs, Liveringa, Meda, Mornington, Mount Hart, Mount House, Myroodah and Noonkanbah Station all of which are cattle stations supplying the beef market.

Parts of the shire area have been included in the West Kimberley heritage assessment area.

== Elected council ==
All nine councillors represent the whole of the Shire.

Ward	Councillor	Position
Unsubdivided	Peter McCumstie	President
Unsubdivided	Geoff Haerewa	Deputy president
Unsubdivided	Andrew Twaddle	
Unsubdivided	Paul Bickerton	
Unsubdivided	Geoff Davis	
Unsubdivided	Brett Angwin	
Unsubdivided	Brian Ellison	
Unsubdivided	Kerrissa O’Meara	
Unsubdivided	Wayne Foley	

== Towns and localities ==
The towns and localities of the Shire of Derby–West Kimberley with population and size figures based on the most recent Australian census:

Locality	Population	Area	Map
Camballin	500 (SAL 2021)	4,210 km^{2} (1,630 sq mi)	
Derby	3,222 (SAL 2021)	162.4 km^{2} (62.7 sq mi)	
Durack *	169 (SAL 2021)	29,213.7 km^{2} (11,279.5 sq mi)	
Fitzroy Crossing	1,181 (SAL 2021)	28 km^{2} (11 sq mi)	
Geegully Creek	9 (SAL 2021)	8,930 km^{2} (3,450 sq mi)	
Gibb *	80 (SAL 2021)	12,747.6 km^{2} (4,921.9 sq mi)	
Jarlmadangah Burru Community	35 (SAL 2021)	7.2 km^{2} (2.8 sq mi)	
Kimbolton	52 (SAL 2021)	6,907.2 km^{2} (2,666.9 sq mi)	
King Leopold Ranges	265 (SAL 2021)	35,359.8 km^{2} (13,652.5 sq mi)	
Meda	17 (SAL 2021)	4,334.6 km^{2} (1,673.6 sq mi)	
Mount Hardman	502 (SAL 2021)	9,013.8 km^{2} (3,480.2 sq mi)	
Mueller Ranges *	366 (SAL 2021)	37,982.5 km^{2} (14,665.1 sq mi)	
Roebuck *	606 (SAL 2021)	5,582.4 km^{2} (2,155.4 sq mi)	
St George Ranges	1,133 (SAL 2021)	29,268.5 km^{2} (11,300.6 sq mi)	
Waterbank *	110 (SAL 2021)	6,634 km^{2} (2,561 sq mi)	
Willare	127 (SAL 2021)	3,085 km^{2} (1,191 sq mi)	

- (* indicates locality is only partially located within this shire)

== Indigenous communities ==
Indigenous communities in the Shire of Derby–West Kimberley:

- Yungngora Community
- Looma Community
- Mowanjum Community

== Notable councillors ==
- John McLarty, West Kimberley Roads Board chairman 1884; later a state MP

== Heritage-listed places ==
As of 2023, 100 places are heritage-listed in the Shire of Derby–West Kimberley, of which 20 are on the State Register of Heritage Places.
