= Native Title Act 1993 =

Act of the Parliament of Australia

Parliament of Australia
- Long title: An Act about native title in relation to land or waters, and for related purposes.
- Citation: Act No. 110 of 1993 or Act No. 110 of 1993 as amended
- Territorial extent: Australia
- Royal assent: 24 December 1993
- Status: Amended

The Native Title Act 1993 (Cth) is an act of the Australian Parliament, the purpose of which is "to provide a national system for the recognition and protection of native title and for its co-existence with the national land management system". The Act was passed by the Keating government following the High Court's decision in Mabo v Queensland (No 2) (1992). The Act commenced operation on 1 January 1994.

== Act ==
This legislation aimed to codify the Mabo decision and implemented strategies to facilitate the process of recognising native title in Australia. The Act also established the National Native Title Tribunal, to register, hear and determine native title claims. According to the Australian Government:

The Native Title Act 1993 establishes a framework for the protection and recognition of native title. The Australian legal system recognises native title where:

- the rights and interests are possessed under traditional laws and customs that continue to be acknowledged and observed by the relevant Indigenous Australians,
- by virtue of those laws and customs, the relevant Indigenous Australians have a connection with the land or waters,
- the native title rights and interests are recognised by the common law of Australia.

The Native Title Act sets up processes to determine where native title exists, how future activity impacting upon native title may be undertaken, and to provide compensation where native title is impaired or extinguished. The Act gives Indigenous Australians who hold native title rights and interests—or who have made a native title claim—the right to be consulted and, in some cases, to participate in decisions about activities proposed to be undertaken on the land. Indigenous Australians have been able to negotiate benefits for their communities, including in relation to employment opportunities and heritage protection.

The Act also establishes a framework for the recognition and operation of representative bodies that provide services to native title claimants and native title holders. The Australian Government provides significant funding to resolve native title issues in accordance with the Act, including to native title representative bodies, the National Native Title Tribunal and the Federal Court of Australia.

Under the Act, the Aboriginal and Torres Strait Islander Social Justice Commissioner was required to prepare an annual report to the Attorney-General of Australia on the operation of the Act and its effect on the exercise and enjoyment of human rights of Aboriginal and Torres Strait Islander peoples; and report, when requested by the Attorney-General, on any other matter relating to the rights of Indigenous people under the Act.

The objectives of the Commissioner were to provide and promote a human rights perspective on native title; to assist in developing more efficient native title processes; and to advocate for the co-existence between Indigenous and non-Indigenous interests in land based on compatible land use. All of the reports from 1994 to 2016 have been published online; since 2013, the Native Title and Social Justice Reports have been combined and published as one report.

Changes brought about by the Human Rights Legislation Amendment Act 2017 removed the statutory obligation for an annual Social Justice and Native Title Report such as those produced up to and including 2016; however, the Commissioner continues to produce reports at the culmination of key projects.

== Amendments ==
The Native Title Amendment Act 1998 (Cth), also commonly referred to as the "10-Point Plan", is an amendment to the Native Title Act by the Howard government made in response to the Wik Decision by the High Court. The Wik decision held that Native Title could co-exist with pastoral leases and were not necessarily extinguished. This contradicted the assumptions of many in government and the community (although not the entire legal community), causing a great deal of uncertainty, unease and debate. McHugh J stated that the reason for this surprise was due to statements in Mabo (No 2) that leases extinguish native title, the preamble to the native title act stated that "native title is extinguished by valid government acts... such as the grant of freehold or leasehold estates", that the Land Act 1910 (Qld) and the Land Act 1962 (Qld) described pastoral leases as leases (which suggested a right to exclusive possession) and for 126 year Queensland lawyers had argued and believed this.

Some States were concerned that mining leases granted after the passing of the Native Title Act would no longer be valid, as the right to negotiate under the Native Title Act was not respected. The ruling also created fears by some that a huge amount of land claims in Australia would now be in doubt, with the head of the National Farmer's Federation claiming that even residential plots in Canberra could be threatened by claims. This was despite the fact that the ruling stated that the rights of pastoralists would override native title rights in the event of any inconsistencies. The resulting amendments substantially restricted Native Title by narrowing the right to negotiate, increasing the threshold test for Native Title claims to be made, extinguishing Native Title on all leases issued before 1994 that granted exclusive possession and granting more power to the states to manage claims. The laws also introduced Indigenous land use agreements as an alternative to native title claims. The text of the legislation was extremely specific and complex in order to override the protections and use of the Racial Discrimination Act in interpreting the legislation.

The ten points in the "10-Point Plan" were:

1. The National Native Title Tribunal holds absolute authority over claims for native title.
2. State governments are empowered to extinguish Native Title over crown lands for matters of "national interest".
3. Lands providing public amenities are exempt from Native Title claims.
4. Mining and pastoral leases are allowed to co-exist with Native Title.
5. The National Native Title Tribunal can create access to traditional lands rather than granting full Native Title.
6. A registration test is imposed on all claimants.
7. The right to claim Native Title in or around urban areas is removed.
8. Government is permitted to manage land, water, and air issues in any site.
9. Very strict time limits will be placed on all claims.
10. Indigenous land use agreements will be created to promote co-existence.

ANTaR (Australians for Native Title and Reconciliation) helped to coordinate a response to the amendments; native title rights became the focus of a national campaign by ANTaR in 1997–8, with a central project called the Sea of Hands. In Parliament, the legislation was opposed by the Australian Labor Party and the Australian Democrats. Additionally, the United Nations Committee on the Elimination of Racial Discrimination expressed concern that the amendments might breach Australia's obligation under the Convention on the Elimination of Racial Discrimination (CERD) as they appeared to significantly "extinguish or impair the exercise of indigenous title rights and interests". Additionally the committee noted that the lack of Indigenous participation in the creation of the amendments and re-affirmed their recommendation that "no decisions directly relating to [indigenous peoples] rights and interests are [to be] taken without their informed consent".

The final legislation was amended to gain the support of Independent Senator Brian Harradine, whose vote was required for the bill to pass.

In 2007, the Howard government passed the Native Title Amendment Act 2007, and the Native Title Amendment (Technical Amendments) Act 2007, a package of coordinated measures and technical amendments to improve the performance of the native title system. These are aimed at making the native title process more efficient and to speed up the determination of whether native title exists on the 580 claims that had been registered but not yet determined.

The Native Title Act 1993 was further amended by the Rudd government by the Native Title Amendment Act 2009. It allows the Federal Court to determine who may mediate a claim, whether that be the court itself, the Native Title Tribunal, or otherwise.

The Act continues to be reviewed and amended. A major review of the Act by the Australian Law Reform Commission in 2015 made 30 recommendations to reform it. It did not suggest altering the fundamental framework and model of native title and the claims process, but recommended a "refocus on the core elements of native title law to facilitate an effective determination process". As of June 2020 it has had six amendments since 2015.

== Legacy ==
The High Court in Western Australia v Commonwealth (1995) upheld the Native Title Act and struck down a conflicting Western Australia statute.

In 1999, the High Court cited the Native Title Act when it ruled in favour of Aboriginal Australians' right to hunt according to traditional methods, even in cases where the animal is protected by law. The case was Yanner v Eaton.

== See also ==
- Indigenous land rights in Australia
- List of laws concerning Indigenous Australians
- Registered Native Title Body Corporate
