= Electoral district of Kimberley =

Kimberley Western Australia—Legislative Assembly
- Interactive map of electoral district boundaries from the 2025 state election
- State: Western Australia
- Dates current: 1904–present
- MP: Divina D'Anna
- Party: Labor
- Namesake: Kimberley region
- Electors: 18,440 (2025)
- Area: 839,289 km^{2} (324,051.3 sq mi)
- Demographic: Remote and provincial
Electorates around Kimberley:
Indian Ocean	Timor Sea	Northern Territory
Pilbara	Kimberley	Northern Territory
Mid-West	Kalgoorlie	Northern Territory

Kimberley is an electoral district of the Legislative Assembly of Western Australia, located in the state's far north and named after the Kimberley region. It includes the region's main town, Broome. The electorate has one of the highest Aboriginal enrolments of any seat in the Parliament.

The seat has been held by the Labor Party since 1980—inclusive of one term under a Labor independent (1996–2001), but has become increasingly marginal in recent years. It saw an extremely close and almost unprecedented four-way race at the 2013 state election, with relatively small primary vote margins separating the Labor, Liberal, National and Green candidates in a result that was not known for several days. However, Labor candidate Josie Farrer was able to hold the seat for Labor, winning the seat on Green preferences. In the 2021 state election, Divina D'Anna retained the seat for Labor.

== History ==
First created for the 1904 state election, the district was a combination of two former seats: East Kimberley and West Kimberley. Its first member, Francis Connor, was one of four independents who opted to support the Labor Party's minority government under Premier Henry Daglish. The government fell a year later, and a conservative member won the seat. It was then held for 19 years by non-Labor parties until a split in the Country Party saw Labor gain the seat at the 1924 state election. Labor held the seat continuously for 44 years until losing it to the Liberal Party at the 1968 state election.

The seat became the focus of controversy at the 1977 state election. A significant turnover in voters had occurred, with 1,750 voters including many Aboriginal people being entitled to vote for the first time. The Labor Party endorsed Ernie Bridge, an Aboriginal businessman and president of the Shire of Halls Creek, against the sitting member, Liberal Minister for Lands Alan Ridge. Ridge won the vote but it was successfully challenged in the Court of Disputed Returns on 7 November due to claims of irregular treatment of Aboriginal voters at polling stations and various other concerns, and a by-election was called for 17 December 1977. However, Ridge won the vote on a decreased voter turnout and an increased majority.

At the 1980 state election, Ernie Bridge won the seat. In 1986, Bridge became a minister in the Labor government—the first Aboriginal cabinet minister in any Australian government. In 1996, Bridge resigned from the Labor Party and was re-elected at the 1996 state election as an independent before retiring at the 2001 state election. His successor was Carol Martin, the first Aboriginal woman elected to an Australian parliament.

Four out of seven of the Indigenous Australians that have entered the Western Australian Parliament have originated from this seat.

== Geography ==
Named for the Kimberley region, the electorate is the state's northernmost. The district has a long coastline, being bounded by the Indian Ocean to its north and west. To the east, it is bounded by the Northern Territory border, whilst its southern boundaries are those of local government areas. The district includes four local government areas: Shire of Wyndham-East Kimberley, Shire of Broome, Shire of Derby-West Kimberley, Shire of Halls Creek, all of them in their entirety. Its major population centres include Broome, Derby, Fitzroy Crossing, Halls Creek, Kununurra and Wyndham. It also includes the eastern parts of the Shire of East Pilbara, to the east of the Canning Stock Route.

== Members for Kimberley ==
Member	Party	Term
Francis Connor	Independent	1904–1905
Arthur Male	Ministerial	1905–1911
Arthur Male	Liberal	1911–1917
Michael Durack	Nationalist	1917–1920
Michael Durack	Country	1920–1923
Michael Durack	Country (MCP)	1923–1924
Aubrey Coverley	Labor	1924–1953
John Rhatigan	Labor	1953–1968
Alan Ridge	Liberal	1968–1980
Ernie Bridge	Labor	1980–1996
Ernie Bridge	Independent	1996–2001
Carol Martin	Labor	2001–2013
Josie Farrer	Labor	2013–2021
Divina D'Anna	Labor	2021–present

== Election results ==
2025 Western Australian state election: Kimberley
Party	Candidate	Votes	%	±%
Labor	Divina D'Anna	4,574	43.4	−10.5
Liberal	Darren Spackman	2,351	22.3	+1.8
Greens	Jaala Edith Ozies	1,848	17.5	+2.5
National	Millie Hills	1,169	11.1	+4.9
Christians	Zoe Golding	605	5.7	+5.7
Total formal votes		10,547	96.5	+0.2
Informal votes		386	3.5	−0.2
Turnout		10,933	59.3	−7.6
Two-party-preferred result
Labor	Divina D'Anna	6,751	64.0	−7.4
Liberal	Darren Spackman	3,791	36.0	+7.4
Labor hold		Swing	−7.4	
