= Western Australian Planning Commission =

Statutory authority of Western Australia

Planning Authority overview
- Formed: 1955
- Preceding agencies: Town Planning Board (1928 - 1985); Metropolitan Regional Planning Authority (1963-1985); State Planning Commission (1985-1995)
- Jurisdiction: Government of Western Australia
- Headquarters: Gordon Stephenson House, Perth, Western Australia
- Annual budget: $108.11 million (2024/25)
- Planning Authority executive: Emma Cole, WAPC Chair
- Parent department: Department of Planning, Lands & Heritage
- Website: dplh.wa.gov.au

The Western Australian Planning Commission (WAPC) is an independent statutory authority of the Government of Western Australia. Its function is to coordinate strategic and statutory planning for future urban, rural, and regional land use. The WAPC fulfils various statutory responsibilities first established in 1955. The authority is responsible for expenditure arising from the Metropolitan Region Improvement Tax.

The role of the commission is to advise the Minister for Planning, make statutory decisions on a range of planning application types, approve subdivision applications, implement the state planning framework, and prepare and review region schemes to cater for anticipated growth. Resources and staff to carry out these responsibilities are provided by the Department of Planning, Lands and Heritage to which it also delegates many statutory powers.

== History ==
The Town Planning and Development Act 1928 established a Town Planning Board as the central authority responsible for approving subdivision and town planning schemes prepared by local government. The state's Town Planning Commissioner David Davidson sought to expand the board responsibilities into planning for the metropolitan region as a whole—however in 1927 a separate Metropolitan Town Planning Commission was established to prepare a report on the matter of metropolitan planning, after which it was disbanded.

In 1952, a second commission recommended the metropolitan planning of Perth and Fremantle leading to the appointment of Gordon Stephenson to prepare the 1955 Plan for Perth and Fremantle. This report recommended the creation of an independent authority for the implementation of a metropolitan town planning scheme. The Metropolitan Region Town Planning Scheme Act 1959 created this authority as the Metropolitan Regional Planning Authority (MRPA) with David Carr as the chief planner. In 1963 the Metropolitan Region Scheme was adopted by the Parliament of Western Australia and the Metropolitan Region Town Planning Scheme Act Amendment Act 1963 was passed.

Western Australian Planning Commission Act 1985

Parliament of Western Australia

The MRPA was funded by a hypothecated property tax under the MRS which gave it an independent source of revenue that allowed it to disregard government direction. This led to its abolition in December 1985 by the Western Australian Planning Commission Act 1985, with bi-partisan support, when the Metropolitan Regional Planning Authority became the Metropolitan Planning Council under a State Planning Commission which also absorbed the functions of the Town Planning Board.

In September 1989 the State Planning Commission became a board of members with all staff transferred to the Department of Planning and Urban Development. It was subsequently renamed the Western Australian Planning Commission in 1995.

In 2024 the commission was reformed to reduce the total number of members to nine, clarify roles and responsibilities and to increase the number of members with direct professional experience relating to town planning and commission functions.
