= Aboriginal communities in Western Australia =

Aboriginal communities of Western Australians

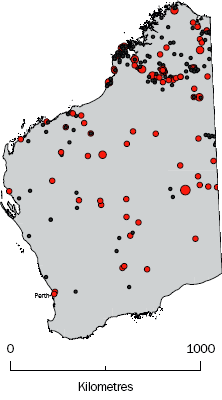
Legend:
- Large red dot: 500 people or more
- Medium red dot: 200 to 499
- Small red dot: 50 to 199
- Smaller back dot: less than 50 people

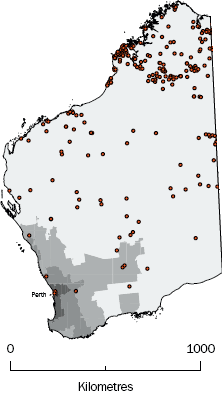
- Very remote
- Remote
- Outer regional
- Inner regional
- Major city

Indigenous communities by usual population (left) and by remoteness area (right) based on ABS data for 2006

Aboriginal communities in Western Australia are communities for Aboriginal Australians within their ancestral country; the communities comprise families with continuous links to country that extend before the European settlement of Australia.

The governments of Australia and Western Australia have supported and funded these communities in a number of ways for over 40 years; prior to that Indigenous people were non-citizens with no rights, forced to work for sustenance on stations as European settlers divided up the areas, or relocated under various Government acts.

== Aboriginal Communities Act 1979 ==
The Aboriginal Communities Act 1979 allowed Aboriginal councils to make and enforce by-laws on their land. Originally it only applied to the Bidyadanga and Bardi communities, but was subsequently extended to others.

== Earlier stages of assistance ==
In the 1980s and 1990s, effort was made to support indigenous communities.

== Politicisation of funding issues ==
In 2014 and 2015 the support of some of the communities was questioned in Western Australian and Australian political discussions.

In 2015 rallies were held across Australia and the world to protest the withdrawal of government support of the communities. A group of Aboriginal protesters set up a camp on Heirisson Island, as "... a place of retreat for all Aboriginal persons who have been and will be forcibly removed by the West Australian Government".

== See also ==
- List of Aboriginal communities in Western Australia
