= Acacia mitodes =

Scientific classification
- Kingdom: Plantae
- Clade: Tracheophytes
- Clade: Angiosperms
- Clade: Eudicots
- Clade: Rosids
- Order: Fabales
- Family: Fabaceae
- Subfamily: Caesalpinioideae
- Clade: Mimosoid clade
- Genus: Acacia
- Species: A. mitodes

Binomial name
- Acacia mitodes A.S.George

Synonyms
- Racosperma mitodes (A.S.George) Pedley

Species of legume

Acacia mitodes is a species of flowering plant in the family Fabaceae, and is endemic to the Drysdale River National Park in the far north of Western Australia. It is a prostrate shrub with glabrous branchlets, phyllodes arranged in whorls, heads of yellow flowers, and glabrous pods.

== Description ==
Acacia mitodes is a prostrate shrub with glabrous branchlets, phyllodes arranged in terete, erect to gently curved whorls of 12 to 17 with erect to somewhat spreading, light brown, tapering stipules 1.5–1.8 mm (0.059–0.071 in) at the base of the phyllodes. The flowers are yellow and borne in six to eight heads on peduncles 15–19 mm (0.59–0.75 in) long, the sepals lobes triangular 1.8–2.0 mm (0.071–0.079 in) long and the petals 2.3–2.5 mm (0.091–0.098 in) long. Flowering occurs from May to June, and the pods are 30–40 mm (1.2–1.6 in) long on a stalk 45–55 mm (1.8–2.2 in) long.

== Taxonomy ==
Acacia mitodes was first formally described in 1999 by Alex George in the Journal of the Royal Society of Western Australia from a specimen he collected from the Carson Escarpment of the Drysdale River National Park in 1996. The specific epithet (mitodes) means "thread-like", referring to the stalk of the pods.

== Distribution and habitat ==
This species of wattle is only known from the type location where it grows in woodland on the top of a sandstone cliff in the Kimberley bioregion of Western Australia.

== Conservation status ==
Acacia mitodes is listed as 'Priority Two' by the Western Australian Government Department of Biodiversity, Conservation and Attractions, meaning that it is poorly known and from only one or a few locations.

== See also ==
- List of Acacia species
