= Drysdale River Station =

Pastoral lease in Western Australia

Coordinates: 15.7028°S 126.3790°E

Location in Western Australia

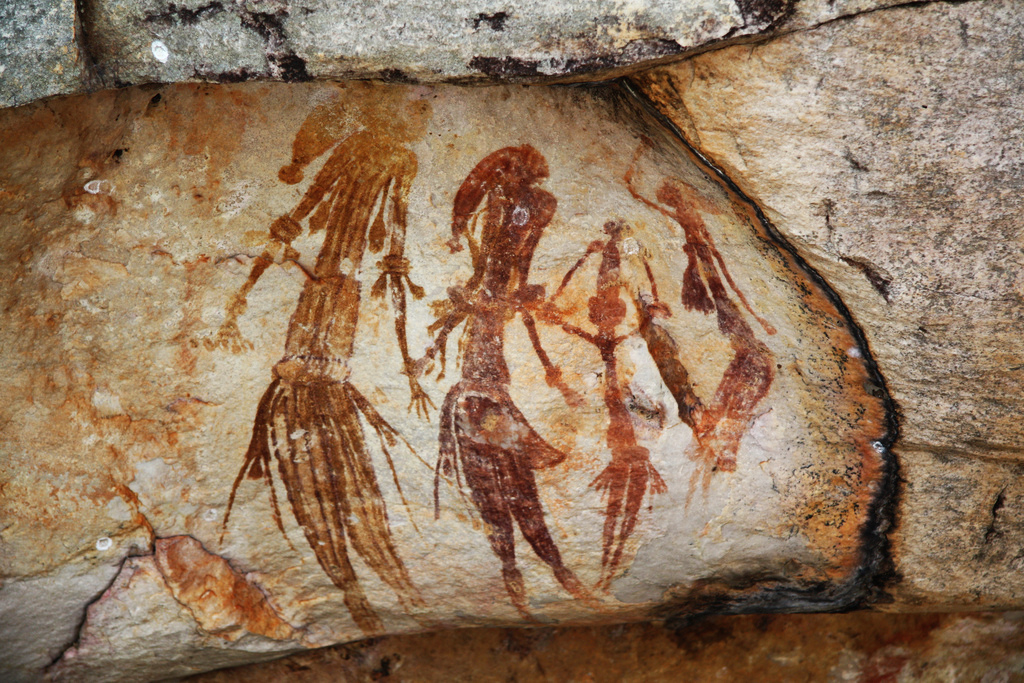
Gwion Gwion rock paintings

Drysdale River Station is a pastoral lease that operates as a cattle station in Western Australia.

== Location ==
It is located just off the Kalumburu Road 360 kilometres (224 mi) west of Kununurra and 470 kilometres (292 mi) east of Derby in the Kimberley region.

== Description ==
The station is approximately 1,000,000 acres (404,686 ha) in size and runs about 7,000 head of cattle.

== History ==
The traditional owners of the area are the Ngarinjin, Miwa and Wilawila peoples.

The pastoral lease is currently owned by the Koeyers family, who took up the lease in 1985. The Koeyers run about 8,000 head of cattle on the property.

The area was initially taken up in 1882 by the Victorian Squatting Company, and the Drysdale River was named by explorer Charles Burrowes in 1886. The company estimated the size of the run as being about 5 million acres, or 20,234 square kilometres (7,812 sq mi). Burrowes had been sent by the company to survey it and compile a report, wrote a glowing account of the country and prophesied a great future for it. Captain Joe Bradshaw took up the lease in 1891 as part of a large area extending along the Prince Regent River. While lost during an exploration of the area Bradshaw stumbled across the Indigenous Australian Gwion Gwion rock paintings, which are over 50,000 years old. He sent his steamer, Red Gauntlet, ahead of him with Aeneas Gunn to construct stockyards while Bradshaw began to drove his herd overland from Queensland. Bradshaw was met at the border by a party of policemen who demanded a tax of 1 pound per head to bring them into Western Australia. He refused and took his stock down the Victoria River to establish another station, Bradshaw's Run, now known as Bradshaw Station. The remoteness of the station was partially remedied by the surveying and construction of the Kalumburu Road from the Gibb River Road to Kalumburu in 1954.

Dick Condon acquired the property in 1967 with the intention of making many improvements. He spent a large amount of money on the station, including the construction of a new homestead. The homestead was to be situated close to the river until it was noticed the debris stuck in the treetops along the riverbanks. It was then built 1.5 kilometres (0.93 mi) from the river, just far enough to avoid being inundated by the floods of 1986 and 1997. Condon sold the property off to an overseas company and it was left to fall into disrepair.

The station is almost inaccessible by road during the wet season between December and May each year. During this time the area is dependent on the station's airstrip which was upgraded in 2002 following funding from the state government in 2001.

In 2012 the lessee was Sunlight Holdings. Drysdale River is operating under the Crown Lease numbers CL515-1967 and CL539-1995 and has the Land Act numbers LA398/446 and LA398/844.

== See also ==
- List of ranches and stations
- List of pastoral leases in Western Australia
- List of the largest stations in Australia
