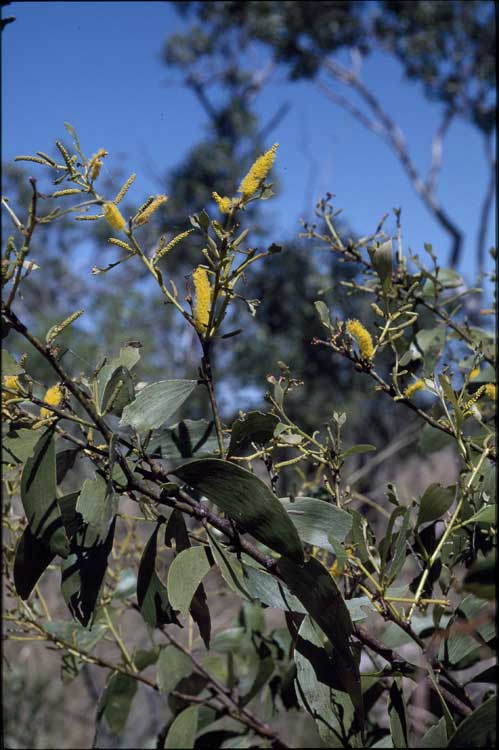
- On the King Edward River crossing on the Mitchell Plateau Road

Scientific classification
- Kingdom: Plantae
- Clade: Embryophytes
- Clade: Tracheophytes
- Clade: Spermatophytes
- Clade: Angiosperms
- Clade: Eudicots
- Clade: Rosids
- Order: Fabales
- Family: Fabaceae
- Subfamily: Caesalpinioideae
- Clade: Mimosoid clade
- Genus: Acacia
- Species: A. retinervis

Binomial name
- Acacia retinervis Benth.
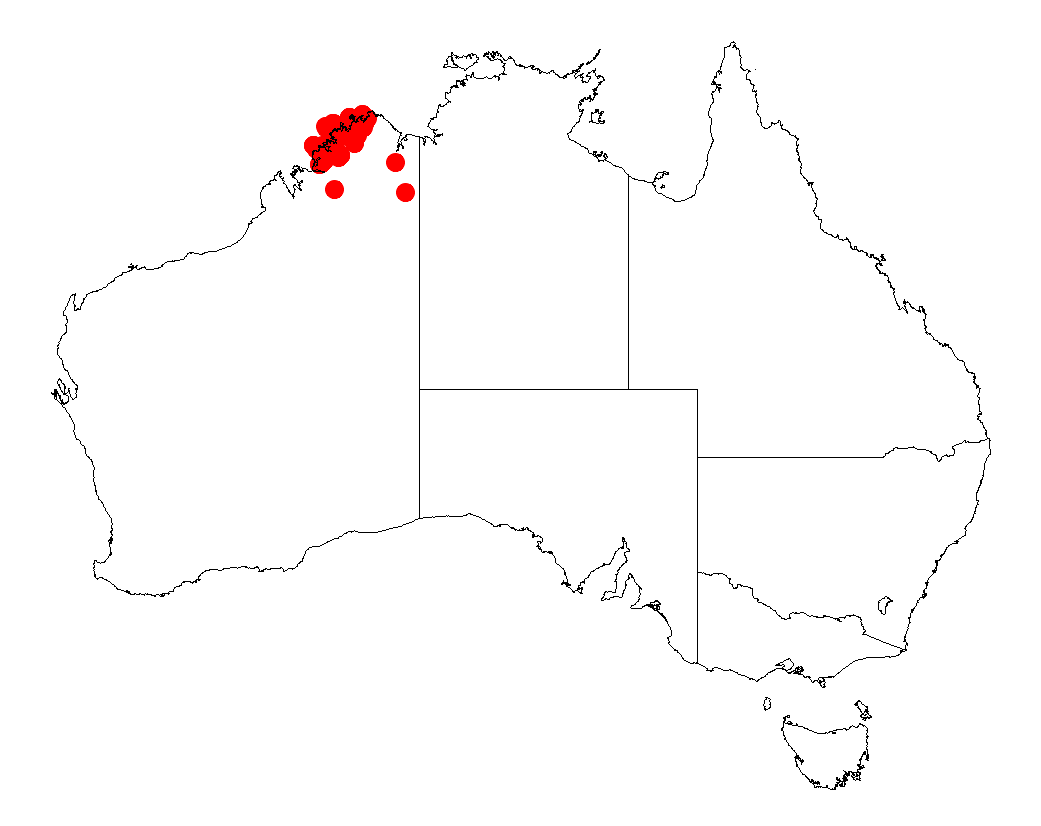
- Occurrence data from AVH

= Acacia retinervis =

Species of legume

Acacia retinervis is a tree or shrub belonging to the genus Acacia and the subgenus Juliflorae endemic to northern western Australia.

== Description ==
The tree or shrub typically grows to a height of 2 to 12 metres (7 to 39 ft). It has fissured brown to grey-brown bark with resinous, scurfy, rusty-brown new shoots that occasionally have a dense covering of silver hairs with glabrous to sparsely haired, terete, light brown to reddish coloured branchlets. Like many species of Acacia it has phyllodes rather than true leaves. It has sickle shaped, glabrous to sometimes sericeous phyllodes falcate with a length of 7 to 14 cm (2.8 to 5.5 in) and a width of 6 to 25 mm (0.24 to 0.98 in) and have three to five prominent longitudinal veins surrounded by minor veins that are almost touching each other. It blooms from April to September producing yellow flowers.

== Taxonomy ==
The species was first formally described by the botanist George Bentham in 1842 as part of William Jackson Hookers work Notes on Mimoseae, with a synopsis of species as published in the London Journal of Botany. It was reclassified as Racosperma retinerve by Leslie Pedley in 2003 then transferred back to genus Acacia in 2006.

== Distribution ==
It is native to a large area in the Kimberley region of Western Australia where it grows among sandstone or laterite. It is situated on the mainland extending from the coast south to the Mitchell Plateau and the catchment area of the Prince Regent River where it is usually found among outcrops of sandstone rock.

== See also ==
- List of Acacia species
