= Acacia dacrydioides =

Scientific classification
- Kingdom: Plantae
- Clade: Tracheophytes
- Clade: Angiosperms
- Clade: Eudicots
- Clade: Rosids
- Order: Fabales
- Family: Fabaceae
- Subfamily: Caesalpinioideae
- Clade: Mimosoid clade
- Genus: Acacia
- Species: A. dacrydioides

Binomial name
- Acacia dacrydioides Tindale
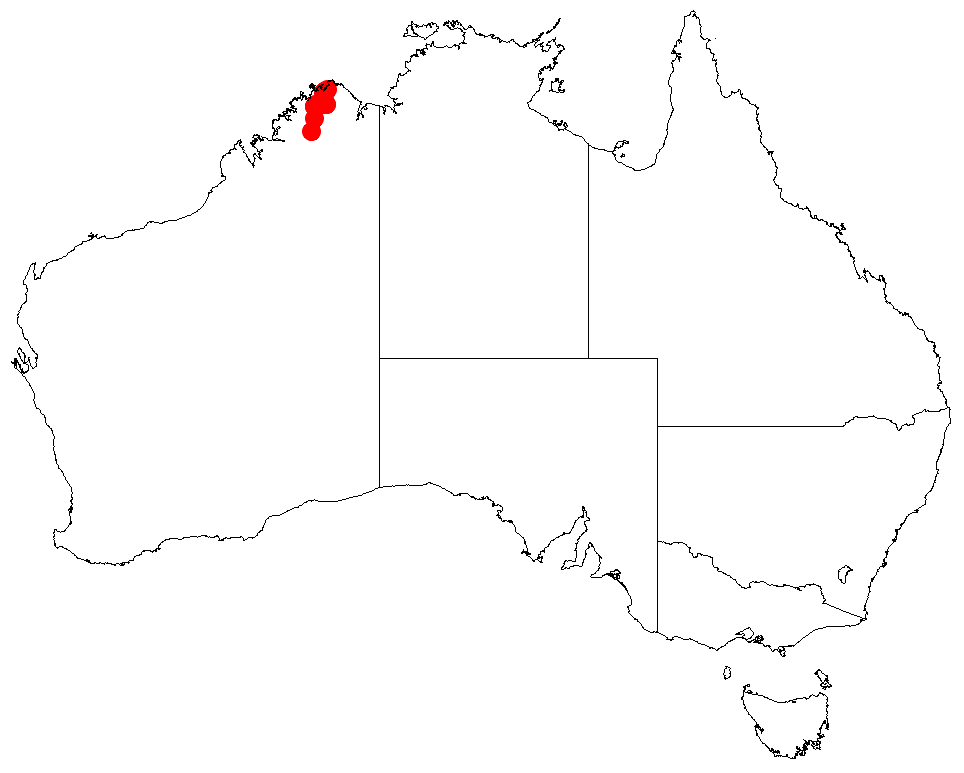
- Occurrence data from AVH

Synonyms
- Racosperma dacrydioides (Tindale) Pedley

Species of legume

Acacia dacrydioides is a species of flowering plant in the family Fabaceae and is endemic to northern Western Australia. It is an arching, spreading shrub with linear to more or less terete phyllodes with a fine point on the end, spikes of yellow flowers and pods appearing somewhat like a string of beads.

== Description ==
Acacia dacrydioides is an arching, spreading shrub that typically grows to a height of 1–3 m (3 ft 3 in – 9 ft 10 in) and has hairy, terete, fawn to reddish brown branchlets. Its phyllodes are linear, more or less terete, 6–13 mm (0.24–0.51 in) long and 0.2–0.5 mm (0.0079–0.0197 in) wide and sparsely hairy with a midvein along the centre line. Flowering occurs from March to June and the flowers are yellow and are borne in spikes 8–22 mm (0.31–0.87 in) long. The pods are 60–80 mm (2.4–3.1 in) long and 3–4 mm (0.12–0.16 in) wide and appear somewhat like a strong of beads.

== Taxonomy ==
Acacia dacrydioides was first formally described in 1975 by Mary Tindale in the journal Telopea from specimens collected in 1971, near the Kalumburu Mission by John Richard Maconochie. The specific epithet (dacrydioides) alludes to the "superficial resemblance to members of the genus Dacrydium".

== Distribution ==
This species of wattle is endemic to the Northern Kimberley bioregion in the north of Western Australia, where it grows on sandstone and quartzite ridges and amongst rocks . The bulk of the population is found in the King Edward River district near the Kalumburu Mission.

== Conservation status ==
"Acacia dacrydioides" is listed as "not threatened" by the Government of Western Australia Department of Biodiversity, Conservation and Attractions.

== See also ==
- List of Acacia species
