= Acacia perpusilla =

King Edward River wattle

Scientific classification
- Kingdom: Plantae
- Clade: Tracheophytes
- Clade: Angiosperms
- Clade: Eudicots
- Clade: Rosids
- Order: Fabales
- Family: Fabaceae
- Subfamily: Caesalpinioideae
- Clade: Mimosoid clade
- Genus: Acacia
- Species: A. perpusilla

Binomial name
- Acacia perpusilla Maslin, M.D.Barrett & R.L.Barrett

Species of legume

Acacia perpusilla, commonly known as the King Edward River wattle, is a shrub of the genus Acacia and the subgenus Plurinerves that is endemic to a small area of north western Australia.

== Description ==
The shrub typically grows to a height of around 2 m (6 ft 7 in)} and has an erect and spindly habit with glabrous and resin-ribbed branchlets that have persistent stipules with a length of 1 to 2 mm (0.039 to 0.079 in). Like most species of Acacia it has phyllodes rather than true leaves. The evergreen phyllodes are ascending to erect with a widely obovate shape and are dimidiate with a rounded upper margin and a straight lower margin. The phyllodes are 3 to 4 mm (0.12 to 0.16 in) in length and 2 to 4 mm (0.079 to 0.157 in) wide with many indistinct longitudinal nerves.

== Distribution ==
It is native to a small area in the Kimberley region of Western Australia. It has a limited distribution and is found on Theda Station about 30 km (19 mi) south west from Kalumburu in the northern Kimberley along the King Edward River where it is commonly situated among sandstone outcrops along watercourses growing in skeletal sandy soils in shrubland communities where it is associated with Heteropogon contortus and species of Sorghum.

== See also ==
- List of Acacia species
