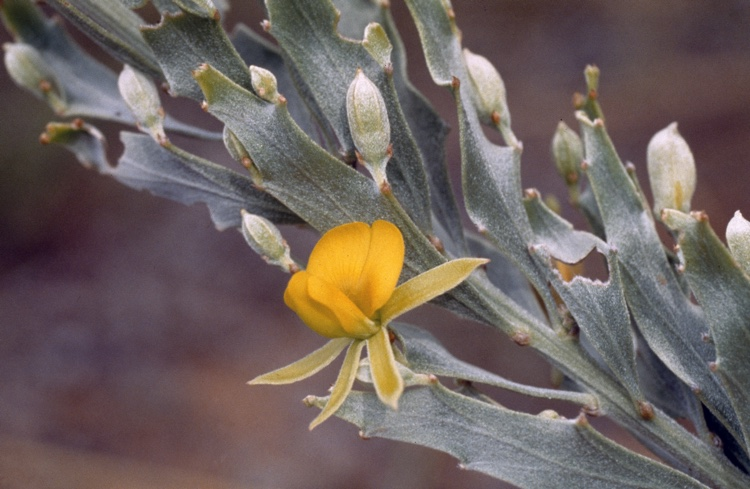

Scientific classification
- Kingdom: Plantae
- Clade: Tracheophytes
- Clade: Angiosperms
- Clade: Eudicots
- Clade: Rosids
- Order: Fabales
- Family: Fabaceae
- Subfamily: Faboideae
- Genus: Jacksonia
- Species: J. argentea

Binomial name
- Jacksonia argentea C.A.Gardner

= Jacksonia argentea =

Species of legume

Jacksonia argentea is a species of flowering plant in the family Fabaceae and is endemic to the far north of Western Australia. It is an erect, silver-grey shrub with flattened, narrowly lance-shaped to narrowly elliptical cladodes or phylloclades, bright yellow flowers, and woody hairy pods.

== Description ==
Jacksonia argentea is a sturdy, erect, silver-grey shrub that typically grows up to 1–4 m (3 ft 3 in – 13 ft 1 in) high and about 1 m (3 ft 3 in) wide, its branches greyish-green. Its end-branches are flattened cladodes or phylloclades, narrowly lance-shaped to narrowly elliptical, 32–67 mm (1.3–2.6 in) long and 5.7–8 mm (0.22–0.31 in) wide and densely hairy. The leaves are reduced to narrowly egg-shaped, reddish brown scale leaves 1.3–3.7 mm (0.051–0.146 in) long, 0.8–2.3 mm (0.031–0.091 in) wide. The flowers are scattered along the branches on a peduncle 1.8–3.8 mm (0.071–0.150 in) long. There are broadly lance-shaped bracteoles 1.2–3.2 mm (0.047–0.126 in) long and 0.7–0.8 mm (0.028–0.031 in) long at the base of the floral tube. The floral tube is 1.1–1.3 mm (0.043–0.051 in) long and the sepals are membranous, the lobes 9.3–12 mm (0.37–0.47 in) long and 1.5–2.5 mm (0.059–0.098 in) wide. The flowers are bright yellow, the standard petal 10.0–10.3 mm (0.39–0.41 in) long, the wings 6.6–6.8 mm (0.26–0.27 in) long, and the keel, 7.3–7.8 mm (0.29–0.31 in) long. The stamens have red-brown filaments 6.0–9.3 mm (0.24–0.37 in) long. Flowering occurs from March to October, and the fruit is a woody hairy pod, 9–11.5 mm (0.35–0.45 in) long and 3.1–4.9 mm (0.12–0.19 in) wide.

== Taxonomy ==
Jacksonia argentea was first formally described in 1923 by Charles Austin Gardner in the Bulletin of the Western Australian Forests Department from specimens collected near the King Edward River. The specific epithet (argentea) means 'silvery'.

== Distribution and habitat ==
This species of Jacksonia grows in woodland close to watercourses on sand over sandstone between Sir Graham Moore Island, Drysdale River Station, King Edward River and Helby River, in the Northern Kimberley bioregion of far northern Western Australia.

== Conservation status ==
Jacksonia argentea is listed as "not threatened" by the Government of Western Australia, Department of Biodiversity, Conservation and Attractions.
