= Goodenia inundata =

Conservation status
- Priority Two — Poorly Known Taxa (DEC)

Scientific classification
- Kingdom: Plantae
- Clade: Tracheophytes
- Clade: Angiosperms
- Clade: Eudicots
- Clade: Asterids
- Order: Asterales
- Family: Goodeniaceae
- Genus: Goodenia
- Species: G. inundata

Binomial name
- Goodenia inundata L.W.Sage & J.P.Pigott

Species of plant

Goodenia inundata is a species of flowering plant in the family Goodeniaceae and is endemic to the Kimberley region of Western Australia. It is an erect, annual or ephemeral herb with narrow egg-shaped stem-leaves and panicles of purple or maroon flowers with a yellow centre.

== Description ==
Goodenia inundata is an erect annual or ephemeral herb that typically grows to a height of 15–34 cm (5.9–13.4 in). The stem-leaves are narrow egg-shaped with the base extending down the stem, 15–30 mm (0.59–1.18 in) long and 4–9 mm (0.16–0.35 in) wide. The flowers are borne in leafy panicles 10–25 mm (0.39–0.98 in) long, the sepals narrow elliptic to narrow egg-shaped, 3–5.1 mm (0.12–0.20 in) long and the corolla 14–18 mm (0.55–0.71 in) long, purple or maroon with a yellow centre. The lower lobes of the corolla are 4.7–6.3 mm (0.19–0.25 in) long with wings 1.8–2.2 mm (0.071–0.087 in) wide. Flowering occurs from May to June and the fruit is a more or less spherical capsule 3.5–4 mm (0.14–0.16 in) in diameter.

== Taxonomy and naming ==
Goodenia inundata was first formally described in 2001 by Leigh William Sage and Julian Patrick Pigott in the journal Nuytsia from specimens collected near the Kalumburu Road in 1993. The specific epithet (inundata) means "flooded", referring to the seasonally inundated habitat of this goodenia.

== Distribution and habitat ==
This goodenia grows in seasonally wet places in the north-west of the Northern Kimberley biogeographic region of Western Australia.

== Conservation status ==
Goodenia inundata is classified as "Priority Two" by the Western Australian Government Department of Parks and Wildlife meaning that it is poorly known and from only one or a few locations.
