= Shire of Wyndham–East Kimberley =

Coordinates: 15°46′26″S 128°44′20″E

Shire of Wyndham East Kimberley
- Local government area
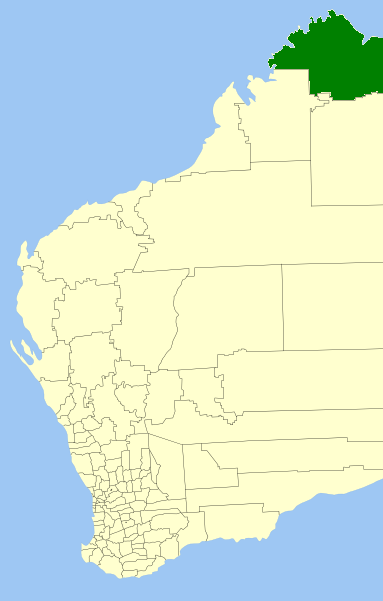
- Location in Western Australia

- Interactive map of Shire of Wyndham East Kimberley
- Country: Australia
- State: Western Australia
- Region: Kimberley
- Established: 1887
- Council seat: Kununurra

Government
  - Shire president: David Menzel
  - State electorate: Kimberley
  - Federal division: Durack

Area
  - Total: 117,514 km^{2} (45,372 sq mi)

Population
  - Total: 7,477 (LGA 2021)
- Website: Shire of Wyndham East Kimberley
LGAs around Shire of Wyndham East Kimberley
Timor Sea	Timor Sea	Timor Sea
Derby-West Kimberley	Shire of Wyndham East Kimberley	Victoria Daly (NT)
Derby-West Kimberley	Halls Creek	Victoria Daly (NT)

The Shire of Wyndham East Kimberley is one of the four local government areas in the Kimberley region of northern Western Australia, covering an area of 117,514 square kilometres (45,372 sq mi) at Western Australia's northeastern corner. The Shire's seat of government was originally in Wyndham but now in the town of Kununurra, which is home to over half of the Shire's permanent population of around 7,000 (ABS 2016), while a council office is located at Wyndham.

El Questro Wilderness Park, Drysdale River National Park, Lake Argyle, the Argyle diamond mine and about half of Gibb River Road are located within the Shire's boundaries.

== History ==
The East Kimberley Road District was gazetted on 10 February 1887. It was renamed as the Wyndham Road District on 4 September 1896. On 1 July 1961, it became the Shire of Wyndham–East Kimberley following the passage of the Local Government Act 1960, which reformed all remaining road districts into shires.

The early 1960s establishment of Kununurra and the Ord River Irrigation Area eventually led to moving the seat of local government from Wyndham to Kununurra, which by the 1980s had become a larger centre of population.

Many large cattle stations exist in the area including Argyle Downs which was established by Patrick Durack and his brother Michael in 1882.

== Council ==
=== Current composition ===
The Shire of Wyndham East Kimberley has nine (9) councillors elected to represent the whole of the Shire.

Ward	Councillor	Notes
Unsubdivided	Menzel, David	President
Unsubdivided	Chafer, Tony	Deputy president
Unsubdivided	Lodge, Grant	
Unsubdivided	Pearce, Debra	
Unsubdivided	Brook, Narelle	
Unsubdivided	Dear, Mat	
Unsubdivided	Farquhar, Judy	
Unsubdivided	Mickittrick, Michelle	
Unsubdivided	Petherick, Alma	

==== List of former and current presidents ====
- D Menzel (2017–present)
- B Parker (2015–2016)
- J Moulden (2011–2015)
- F Mills (2008–2011)
- M Pucci (2005–2008)
- B Johnson (2001–2005)
- M Middap (1997–2001)
- C Wootton (1994–1997)
- D Chapman (1992–1994)
- B Raicevic (1990–1992)
- S Bradley (1985–1990)
- M Trowbridge (1983–1985)
- P Reid (1978–1983)

=== Administration and governance ===
Ordinary council meetings alternate between the council chambers at the Kununurra and Wyndham Shire Offices, which are also the location of the Shire's administrative activities. Customer services are also available at Kununurra and Wyndham Shire Offices.

=== 2015–2016 council controversy ===
In 2016, the Shire of Wyndham East Kimberley Council's power was temporarily transferred to Commissioner Ron Yuryevich (former Mayor of Kalgoorlie). The appointment of a Commissioner was as a result of ongoing dysfunction between the elected councillors with allegations of bullying and undeclared financial interests reported to the Local Government Minister. The Shire was issued with a Show Cause Notice under the Local Government Act 1995 in May 2016, requiring elected members and senior staff to take part in mediation. Mediation was declared untenable by the mediator on 2 August 2016 and the shire was issued with a second Show Cause Notice by the Local Government Minister, notifying his intention to suspend council. Following the resignation of five councillors after the budget adoption in September 2016, the council was left with no quorum and was therefore unable to conduct its business. As a result of these resignations, the Governor of Western Australia made an order under the Local Government Act 1995 declaring all offices vacant and required the appointment of a Commissioner in place of council until the Ordinary Elections in October 2017.

Council elections were held in October 2017 and a new council of 9 councillors sworn in.

== Population ==
Historical population

Year	Pop.	±% p.a.
1991	7,718	—
1996	8,761	+2.57%
2001	9,779	+2.22%
2006	6,596	−7.57%

Year	Pop.	±% p.a.
2011	7,799	+3.41%
2016	7,494	−0.79%
2021	7,477	−0.05%

== Towns and localities ==
The towns and localities of the Shire of Wyndham-East Kimberley with population and size figures based on the most recent Australian census:

Locality	Population	Area	Map
Cambridge Gulf	26 (SAL 2021)	5,887.9 km^{2} (2,273.3 sq mi)	
Drysdale River	38 (SAL 2021)	19,495.3 km^{2} (7,527.2 sq mi)	
Durack *	169 (SAL 2021)	29,213.7 km^{2} (11,279.5 sq mi)	
Gibb *	80 (SAL 2021)	12,747.6 km^{2} (4,921.9 sq mi)	
Kalumburu	388 (SAL 2021)	4.1 km^{2} (1.6 sq mi)	
Kununurra	5,494 (SAL 2021)	2,172.5 km^{2} (838.8 sq mi)	
Lake Argyle *	205 (SAL 2021)	9,247.2 km^{2} (3,570.4 sq mi)	
Mitchell Plateau	87 (SAL 2021)	10,096.2 km^{2} (3,898.2 sq mi)	
Oombulgurri Community	27 (SAL 2021)	12,184.3 km^{2} (4,704.4 sq mi)	
Prince Regent River	4 (SAL 2021)	14,867.9 km^{2} (5,740.5 sq mi)	
Wijilawarrim Community	21 (SAL 2021)	4.7 km^{2} (1.8 sq mi)	
Wyndham	941 (SAL 2021)	936.1 km^{2} (361.4 sq mi)	

- (* indicates locality is only partially located within this shire)

== Indigenous communities ==
Indigenous communities in the Shire of Wyndham-East Kimberley:

- Dodnun community
- Kalumburu
- Kandiwal community
- Ngallagunda Community
- Pago Community
- Woolah (Doon Doon) Community

== Protected areas ==
Protected areas within the Shire of Wyndham-East Kimberley:

National Parks

- Drysdale River
- Lawley River
- Mirima
- Mitchell River
- Prince Regent

Marine Parks

- North Lalang-garram Marine Park
- Lalang-garram / Camden Sound Marine Park
- Lalang-garram / Horizontal Falls Marine Park (Also covers areas in the Shire of Derby West Kimberley)

Nature Reserves & Conservation Parks

- Parry Lagoons Nature Reserve
- Pelican Island Nature Reserve
- Point Spring Nature Reserve
- Ord River Nature Reserve
- Barrbem Conservation Park
- Darram Conservation Park
- Goomig Conservation Park
- Jemarnde-wooningim Conservation Park
- Laterite Conservation Park
- Mijing Conservation Park
- Ngamoowalem Conservation Park

== Notable councillors ==
- Susan Bradley, former councillor and Shire president – Awarded an Order of Australia Medal for her contribution to the Kimberley community

== Heritage-listed places ==
As of 2023, 120 places are heritage-listed in the Shire of Wyndham–East Kimberley, of which three are on the State Register of Heritage Places.
