= Xanthoparmelia kimberleyensis =

Scientific classification
- Kingdom: Fungi
- Division: Ascomycota
- Class: Lecanoromycetes
- Order: Lecanorales
- Family: Parmeliaceae
- Genus: Xanthoparmelia
- Species: X. kimberleyensis

Binomial name
- Xanthoparmelia kimberleyensis Elix (2003)
- Holotype: Western Australia

Species of foliose lichen

Xanthoparmelia kimberleyensis is a species of foliose lichen in the family Parmeliaceae, described by John Alan Elix in 2003. It is endemic to the Kimberley region of Western Australia.

== Taxonomy ==
Xanthoparmelia kimberleyensis was distinguished as a new species due to its unique chemical profile and morphological features that differ from closely related species such as Xanthoparmelia isidiosa. This species forms part of the diverse genus Xanthoparmelia known for its foliose (leafy) thalli and diverse secondary metabolites.

== Description ==
The thallus of Xanthoparmelia kimberleyensis is small-foliose, closely adhering to the substrate, and extends up to 5 cm (2 in) across. The lobes are closely set, often slightly overlapping, and range from 0.8 to 2.0 mm wide. These lobes are flat, dull in the centre but shiny at the tips, and develop irregular cracks with age, eventually forming a mosaic-like pattern in the centre.

Isidia, or small outgrowths used in reproduction, are moderately dense on this lichen, ranging from spherical to short-cylindrical shapes. They are simple, sometimes branched, and maintain their integrity without bursting open. The upper surface starts as yellow-green but darkens over time.

The lower surface is dark brown to brown-black, with sparse, colour-matching rhizines that are simple in structure. No fruiting bodies (apothecia) or asexual spore-producing structures (pycnidia) have been observed on the specimens studied.

== Chemistry ==
Chemical spot tests on Xanthoparmelia kimberleyensis show a medulla that reacts K+ (yellow turning to dark red) and P+ (orange-red), indicating the presence of salazinic acid as the major secondary metabolite (lichen product), along with minor amounts of usnic acid, butlerin D and G, consalazinic acid, norstictic acid, and traces of protocetraric acid.

== Habitat and distribution ==
This species is exclusively found in the Kimberley region of Western Australia, particularly at Donkey Escarpment near Drysdale River Station. It grows on sandstone rocks within Eucalyptus woodlands, indicating its preference for rocky, open areas.

== See also ==
- List of Xanthoparmelia species
