= Drysdale River National Park =

National park in Western Australia

- IUCN category II (national park)
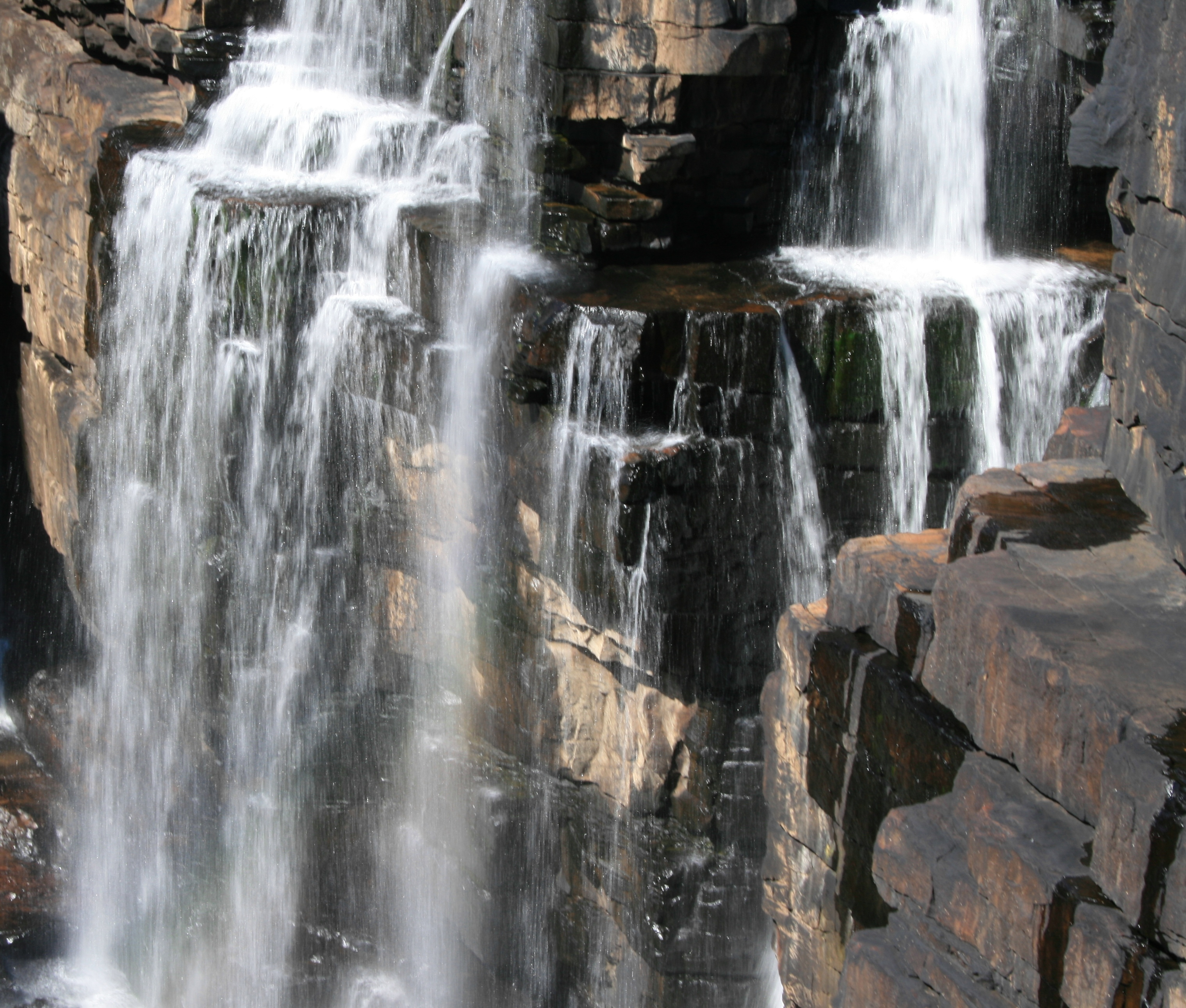
- The King George Falls in June 2008

- Location within Western Australia
- Location: Western Australia
- Nearest city: Kalumburu
- Coordinates: 15°09′41″S 126°46′35″E
- Area: 4,482.64 km^{2} (1,730.76 sq mi)
- Established: 1974
- Governing body: Department of Environment and Conservation
- Website: Official website

Drysdale River (or Drysdale River National Park) is a national park in the Kimberley region of Western Australia, 2,168 kilometres (1,347 mi) northeast of Perth.

The park lies about 100 km (62 mi) south of Kalumburu and 150 km (93 mi) west of Wyndham.

The park is the largest and least accessible in the Kimberley, with no public road leading to it and no airstrip within its boundaries. Access to the park is gained via the track from Carson River Station from the Kalumburu Road. Permission must be obtained from the Kalumburu Aboriginal Corporation prior to entering the park. There are no visitor facilities or marked walk trails in the park. Rangers do not patrol the park and no food, fuel or mechanical services exist within the park or at Carson River Station.

The park is a good example of untouched Kimberley, wilderness featuring open woodland, gorges, cliffs, and the pools, waterfalls and creeks of the Drysdale River. The park is home to two large waterfalls, Morgan Falls and Solea Falls, with numerous smaller falls along the course of the river.

The area provides habitat for many rare plants and animals. Almost 600 species of plants are known to exist within the park. About 30 of these plants are aquatic and swamp varieties that inhabit the permanent pools found along the Drysdale and Carson Rivers. About 25 species of fern also inhabit the area, two of which are not found elsewhere. Species such as fan palms, kalumbaru gums and paperbarks are also found along the watercourses.

A variety of fauna also exist within the park, including over 100 species of birds, sugar gliders, bats, wallabies, and salt water crocodiles.

The traditional owners of the area that the river flows through are the Ngarinjin, Miwa and Wilawila peoples.

The first European to visit the area was CA Burrowes, a surveyor with a squatting company, in 1886. Both Brockman and Crossland visited the area in separate expeditions in 1901. The first vehicular track was constructed through the region during an expedition and survey in 1954; it ran from Gibb River Station to Kalumburu. The park was gazetted in September 1974, using the boundaries recommended by the Australian Academy of Science committee on National Parks in 1955.

== Climate ==
The park has a tropical savanna climate (Köppen: Aw); with a short wet season from November to mid-April and a long dry season from Mid-April to October. Climate data was sourced from the nearest weather station at the Doongan cattle farm. The area experiences 97.2 cloudy days and 105.5 clear days per annum. Extreme temperatures have ranged from 44.0 °C (111.2 °F) on 22 October 2002 to 1.6 °C (34.9 °F) on 9 August 1995. The wettest recorded day was 16 March 2012 with 243.0 mm (9.57 in) of rainfall.

Climate data for Doongan (nearest weather station) (15.38°S 126.31°E) (385 m (1,263 ft) AMSL) (1988-2025)
| Month | Jan | Feb | Mar | Apr | May | Jun | Jul | Aug | Sep | Oct | Nov | Dec | Year |
|---|---|---|---|---|---|---|---|---|---|---|---|---|---|
| Record high °C (°F) | 40.0 (104.0) | 39.0 (102.2) | 39.0 (102.2) | 38.5 (101.3) | 36.5 (97.7) | 35.0 (95.0) | 35.0 (95.0) | 37.4 (99.3) | 39.9 (103.8) | 44.0 (111.2) | 43.2 (109.8) | 41.9 (107.4) | 44.0 (111.2) |
| Mean daily maximum °C (°F) | 33.2 (91.8) | 32.8 (91.0) | 33.4 (92.1) | 33.3 (91.9) | 31.2 (88.2) | 29.4 (84.9) | 29.6 (85.3) | 31.6 (88.9) | 35.3 (95.5) | 37.0 (98.6) | 36.5 (97.7) | 34.7 (94.5) | 33.2 (91.7) |
| Mean daily minimum °C (°F) | 22.9 (73.2) | 22.8 (73.0) | 22.1 (71.8) | 19.1 (66.4) | 14.9 (58.8) | 11.9 (53.4) | 10.5 (50.9) | 12.3 (54.1) | 17.7 (63.9) | 21.5 (70.7) | 22.9 (73.2) | 23.3 (73.9) | 18.5 (65.3) |
| Record low °C (°F) | 15.8 (60.4) | 17.0 (62.6) | 13.5 (56.3) | 8.5 (47.3) | 3.6 (38.5) | 2.0 (35.6) | 1.8 (35.2) | 1.6 (34.9) | 5.8 (42.4) | 12.5 (54.5) | 16.0 (60.8) | 14.0 (57.2) | 1.6 (34.9) |
| Average precipitation mm (inches) | 302.1 (11.89) | 238.7 (9.40) | 203.4 (8.01) | 46.8 (1.84) | 15.9 (0.63) | 6.4 (0.25) | 2.6 (0.10) | 0.7 (0.03) | 6.6 (0.26) | 39.4 (1.55) | 116.5 (4.59) | 216.3 (8.52) | 1,201.9 (47.32) |
| Average precipitation days (≥ 0.2 mm) | 19.1 | 16.9 | 13.8 | 4.3 | 1.5 | 0.7 | 0.4 | 0.1 | 0.9 | 4.7 | 10.8 | 15.8 | 89 |
| Average afternoon relative humidity (%) | 60 | 62 | 53 | 38 | 33 | 31 | 27 | 23 | 24 | 27 | 39 | 52 | 39 |
| Average dew point °C (°F) | 21.5 (70.7) | 21.5 (70.7) | 19.3 (66.7) | 14.7 (58.5) | 10.9 (51.6) | 8.4 (47.1) | 6.8 (44.2) | 5.3 (41.5) | 9.9 (49.8) | 12.1 (53.8) | 17.1 (62.8) | 19.9 (67.8) | 14.0 (57.1) |
Source: Bureau of Meteorology (1988-2025)

== See also ==
- Protected areas of Western Australia
