= Eagle Falls =

Eagle Falls can refer to:

- In Australia -
  - Eagle Falls (Kimberley)
- In the USA
  - Eagle Falls (California)
  - Eagle Falls (Kentucky)
  - Eagle Falls (Washington)
