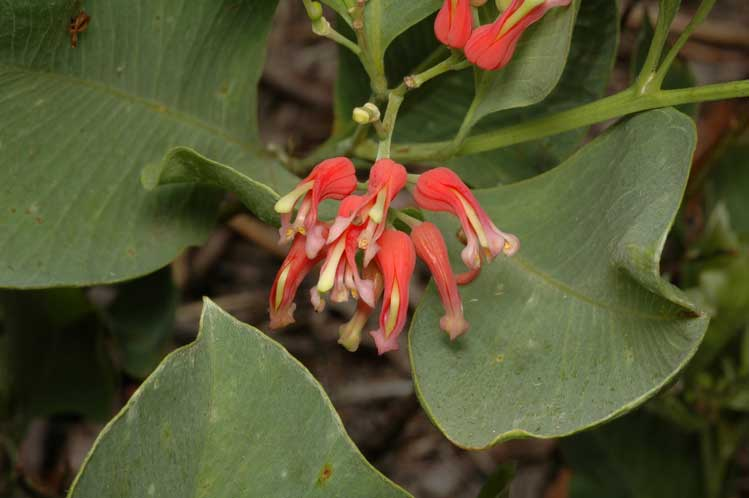
- In the Hunter Region Botanic Gardens

Conservation status
- Least Concern (IUCN 3.1)

- Priority Two — Poorly Known Taxa (DEC)

Scientific classification
- Kingdom: Plantae
- Clade: Embryophytes
- Clade: Tracheophytes
- Clade: Angiosperms
- Clade: Eudicots
- Order: Proteales
- Family: Proteaceae
- Genus: Grevillea
- Species: G. latifolia

Binomial name
- Grevillea latifolia C.A.Gardner

= Grevillea latifolia =

Species of shrub endemic to Western Australia

Grevillea latifolia is a species of flowering plant in the family Proteaceae and is endemic to the Kimberley region of Western Australia. It is a shrub with round or broadly egg-shaped to heart-shaped leaves with the narrower end towards the base, and clusters of pale to deep flowers that turn red as they age.

== Description ==
Grevillea latifolia is a shrub that typically grows to a height of 1.0–2.5 m (3 ft 3 in – 8 ft 2 in) and often has many stems. Its adult leaves are round or broadly egg-shaped to heart-shaped with the narrower end towards the base 35–150 mm (1.4–5.9 in) long, 50–150 mm (2.0–5.9 in) wide and flat. The flowers are arranged in leaf axils or on the ends of branches in clusters of six to sixteen on a rachis 3–8 mm (0.12–0.31 in) long. They are pale to deep pink, ageing to red, each flower on a pedicel 3.5–8 mm (0.14–0.31 in) long. The style is white, and the pistil 12–19.5 mm (0.47–0.77 in) long. Flowering occurs from March to September and the fruit is a thin-walled follicle 16–19 mm (0.63–0.75 in) long.

== Taxonomy ==
Grevillea latifolia was first formally described in 1923 by Charles Gardner in the Bulletin of the Western Australian Forests Department.

== Distribution and habitat ==
This grevillea grows amongst medium to low trees in woodlands or grasslands in scattered populations on the Mitchell and Gardner Plateaus, the King Edward and Lawley Rivers almost to Wyndham in the east. It grows in sandy or loamy soils on sandstone, quartzite or laterite.

== Ecology ==
Grevillea latifolia is able to regenerate from both seed and from its lignotuber.

== Conservation status ==
This grevillea is listed as priority two by the Western Australian Government Department of Biodiversity, Conservation and Attractions, meaning that it is poorly known and from only one or a few locations.

== See also ==
- List of Grevillea species
