= Mitchell Falls (Australia) =

Waterfall in Western Australia

Coordinates: 14°49′21″S 125°41′43″E

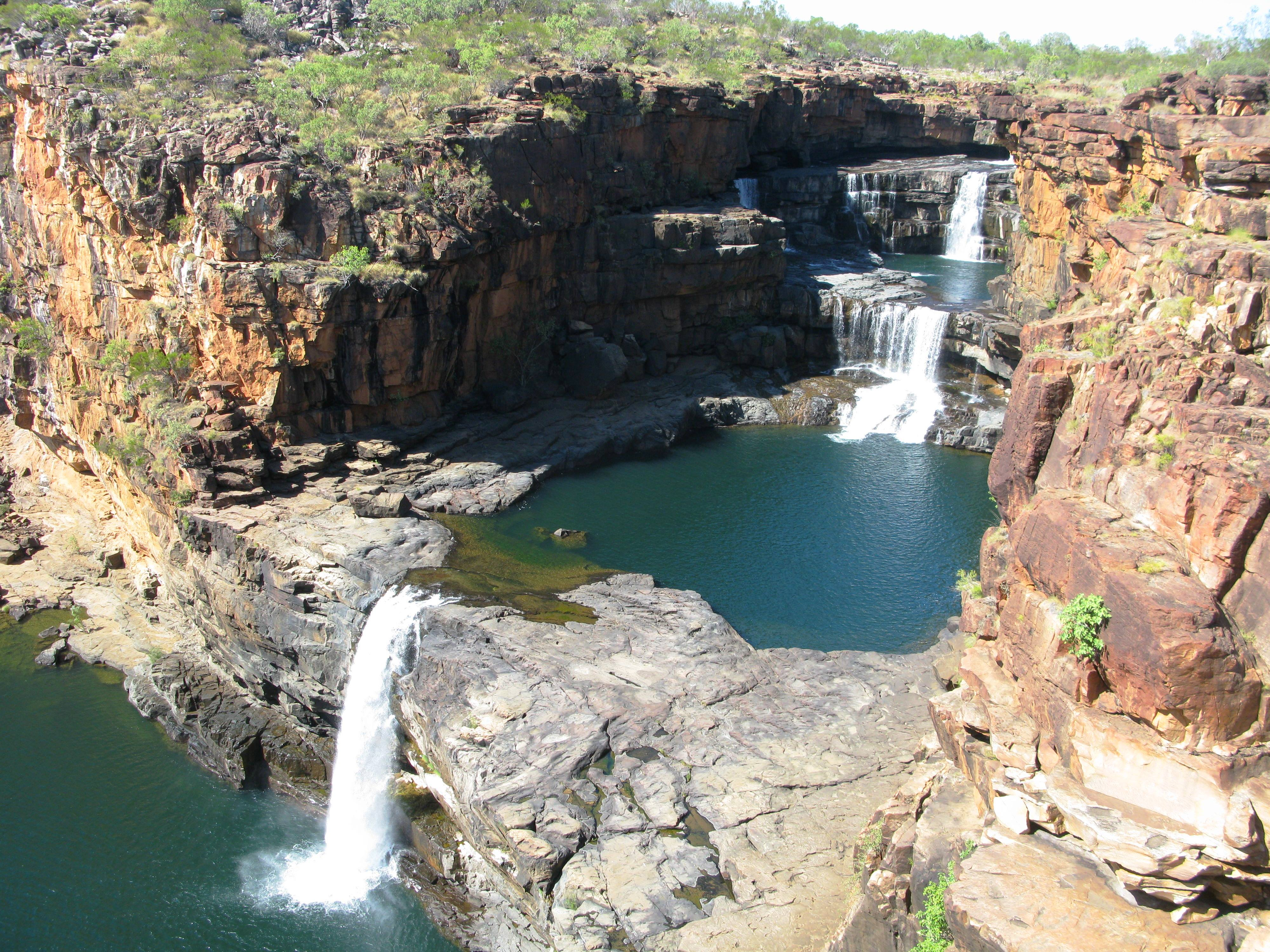
Mitchell Falls, Mitchell River National Park in 2013

Mitchell Falls, located in the Mitchell River National Park, is a tiered, multi-step cascade waterfall in the remote Kimberly region of Western Australia. The Wunambal Gaambera people are the traditional owners of the land on which the Mitchell River runs. Having inhabited the land for over 40,000 years, they have a deep spiritual and cultural connection to the waterfall and surrounds. The waterfall is a popular tourist and hiking destination for those passing through the remote and rugged Kimberly region.

== Location and features ==
Mitchell Falls is part of the Mitchell River System which runs through the Kimberly Plateau in Western Australia. The plateau is primarily composed of King Leopard sandstone, which over time the river has eroded at, resulting in gullies, steep cliffs and waterfalls. The stone is rich in iron oxides, producing a deep orange hue. The waterfall consists of four distinct cascading tiers that drop into deep emerald pools, lined by sheer cliffs. The Mitchell River continues up north after the falls, through a deep gorge.

== Access ==
The falls are located in an extremely isolated area of the Kimberly. The area is only accessible by 4WD via Kalumburu Road or Mitchell Plateau Track during the dry season (May-Sept) when the roads dry out and are maintained. Parking at Mitchell Falls campground carpark, followed by a 3.5km hike down a moderate walking trail. The only way of accessing the falls during the wet season is by helicopter from Mitchell Plateau or Drysdale Station.

== See also ==
- Mitchell River National Park (Western Australia)
- List of waterfalls in Australia
