= Acacia lentiginea =

Conservation status
- Priority Two — Poorly Known Taxa (DEC)

Scientific classification
- Kingdom: Plantae
- Clade: Embryophytes
- Clade: Tracheophytes
- Clade: Spermatophytes
- Clade: Angiosperms
- Clade: Eudicots
- Clade: Rosids
- Order: Fabales
- Family: Fabaceae
- Subfamily: Caesalpinioideae
- Clade: Mimosoid clade
- Genus: Acacia
- Species: A. lentiginea

Binomial name
- Acacia lentiginea Maiden & Blakely

Synonyms
- Racosperma lentigineum (Maiden & Blakely) Pedley

Species of legume

Acacia lentiginea is a species of flowering plant in the family Fabaceae and is endemic to the far north of Western Australia. It is an erect, spreading, glabrous, resinous shrub with narrowly elliptic phyllodes and spikes of pale yellow to cream-coloured flowers.

== Description ==
Acacia lentiginea is an erect, spreading, glabrous resinous shrub that typically grows to a height of 1.2–3.5 m (3 ft 11 in – 11 ft 6 in) and has terete, obscurely ribbed branchlets. The phyllodes are narrowly elliptic, slightly curved, 70–100 mm (2.8–3.9 in) long, 7–10 mm (0.28–0.39 in) wide and thin, on a pulvinus about 1 mm (0.039 in) long with three to six more prominent veins. The flowers are pale yellow to cream-coloured and borne in spikes 15–30 mm (0.59–1.18 in) long on peduncles 2–3 mm (0.079–0.118 in) long. Flowering has been recorded in January, May and June but the pods have not been seen.

== Taxonomy ==
Acacia lentiginea was first formally described in 1927 by Joseph Maiden and William Blakely in the Journal of the Royal Society of Western Australia from specimens collected by Charles Gardner in 1921, on hills near the Prince Regent River in sandy soil.

== Distribution and habitat ==
This species of wattle grows between sandstone boulders near a creek on a sandstone pavement in the Prince Regent River area in the Northern Kimberley bioregion of northern Western Australia.

== Conservation status ==
Acacia lentiginea is listed as'Priority Two' by the Western Australian Government Department of Biodiversity, Conservation and Attractions, meaning that it is poorly known and from only one or a few locations.

== See also ==
- List of Acacia species
