= Joseph Bradshaw (pastoralist) =

Australian pastoralist (1854–1916)

Joseph Bradshaw (6 October 1854 – 23 July 1916) was a pastoralist in Western Australia and then the Northern Territory.

== Early life ==
Bradshaw was born in Melbourne in 1854, one of seven children born to a Victorian landowner. His father, Joseph Senior, owned Avoca and Bacchus Marsh stations. Little is known of his childhood other than he had an adventurous spirit and was ambitious and determined, and received his education in Melbourne.

== Western Australia ==
After reading positive reports on pastoral prospects of the Kimberley district in Western Australia written by Alexander Forrest and also influenced by earlier stories by Philip Parker King, Bradshaw formed a syndicate to acquire land along the Prince Regent River.

In 1890 they received approval for 20 blocks of land each with a size of 50,000 acres (20,234 ha), a total area of 4,047 square kilometres (1,563 sq mi) on either side of the river. In January 1891, Bradshaw left Melbourne for Wyndham only to find the town had been destroyed by a cyclone when he arrived. While exploring the area he became lost, and unwittingly became the first European to see Gwion Gwion rock paintings, a distinctive style of Aboriginal art. He first saw these paintings in 1891 and the style of art was named after him, but is now more commonly referred to as Gwion Gwion or Giro Giro.

Bradshaw named the run Marigui, now known as Drysdale River Station, and soon returned to Melbourne to organise the settlement of the property and marry Mary Guy. He soon returned with a group of settlers including his cousin, Aeneus Gunn, and his wife via Darwin.

A trial mob of sheep were landed and used to stock the property before cattle were to be introduced. Bradshaw tried to introduce cattle in 1894 but received a large livestock tax bill that resulted in him abandoning his property and acquiring new lands in the Victoria River district in the Northern Territory.

== Northern Territory ==
The leases to lands along the Victoria River were acquired by Bradshaw in 1894, the property known as Bradshaw's Run or Bradshaw Station occupied an area of 4,800 square miles (12,432 km^{2}). It was bounded by the Victoria River to the south, Joseph Bonaparte Gulf to the west and the Fitzmaurice River to the north.

Bradshaw worked with a London syndicate to acquire 20,000 square miles (51,800 km^{2}) of land on the western side of the Gulf of Carpentaria taking in most of the country between Cape Wessels and the Roper River. The intention of the syndicate was to explore for minerals and pursue pastoral interests. The area was known as Arafura Station.

In the Victoria River district a second lease of 2,000 square miles (5,180 km^{2}) was granted to Frederick Bradshaw, Joseph's brother, in 1898. Frederick joined his brother in 1898 to stock the property with sheep and both leases, which shared a boundary, were being run as one entity. Frederick was murdered along with six companions in 1905 by Aboriginal people when travelling by boat along the Cambridge Gulf. The men were attacked during the night after they landed for wood and fresh water.

The property was initially stocked with sheep but the Bradshaws had little luck with lambing, attacks from Aborigines and dingos as well as grass seeds and focused their efforts on cattle instead.

In 1902 and 1905, Bradshaw donated to the British Museum an important collection of Aboriginal artefacts (boomerangs, weapons, tools, jewellery and vessels) that had been obtained in the vicinity of Victoria River, Northern Territory.

Bradshaw suffered from diabetes in later life, but died of blood poisoning following an operation in Darwin hospital. He was buried at 2 1/2 mile cemetery near Darwin.
