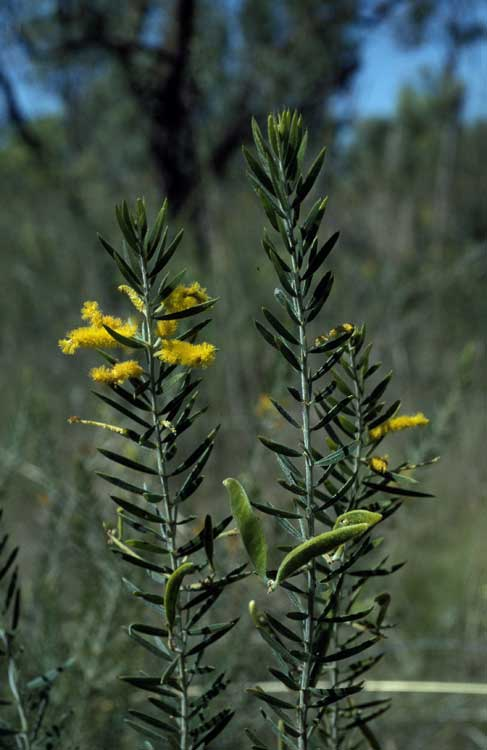
- Near the Gibb River Road

Scientific classification
- Kingdom: Plantae
- Clade: Tracheophytes
- Clade: Angiosperms
- Clade: Eudicots
- Clade: Rosids
- Order: Fabales
- Family: Fabaceae
- Subfamily: Caesalpinioideae
- Clade: Mimosoid clade
- Genus: Acacia
- Species: A. chrysochaeta

Binomial name
- Acacia chrysochaeta Maslin
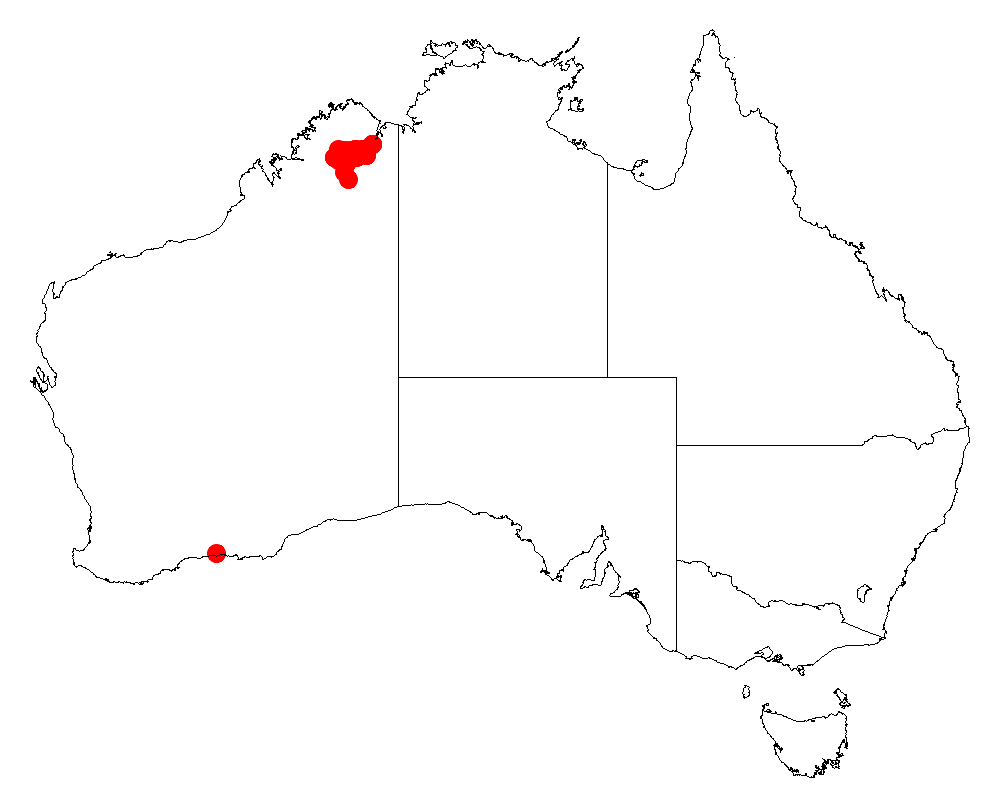
- Occurrence data from AVH

Synonyms
- Racosperma chrysochaetum (Maslin) Pedley

= Acacia chrysochaeta =

Species of legume

Acacia chrysochaeta is a species of flowering plant in the family Fabaceae and is endemic to the north of Western Australia. It is an erect, spindly shrub with hairy branchlets, linear, flat phyllodes, cylindrical spikes of hairy, pale golden yellow flowers that turn white as they age, and hairy, narrowly oblong pods.

== Description ==
Acacia chrysochaeta is an erect, spindly shrub that typically grows to a height of up to 1.5 m (4 ft 11 in), its branchlets brown with yellowish tips. Its phyllodes are linear, flat, 20–45 mm (0.79–1.77 in) long, 2–3 mm (0.079–0.118 in) wide and hairy with one prominent vein and closely pressed against the stems. The flowers are pale golden yellow at first, later white, borne in densely-packed, cylindrical spikes 25–30 mm (0.98–1.18 in) long and covered with woolly hairs. Flowering has been observed from May to June and in November. The pods are narrowly oblong, straight to shallowly curved, 45–60 mm (1.8–2.4 in) long and 7–10 mm (0.28–0.39 in) wide and densely covered with golden hairs that turn white with age. The seeds are black, more or less oblong, 4.5–5.0 mm (0.18–0.20 in) long.

== Taxonomy ==
Acacia chrysochaeta was first formally described in 1983 by Bruce Maslin from specimens collected near the Gibb River homestead by Norman Byrnes in 1971. The specific epithet (chrysochaeta) means 'golden long hairs', referring to the flowers and young pods.

== Distribution ==
This species of wattle grows in eucalypt savanna with annual sorghum and sandy alluvium near watercourses on the Gibb River and Karungie stations in the Central Kimberley, Northern Kimberley and Victoria Bonaparte bioregions of northern Western Australia.

== Conservation status ==
Acacia chrysochaeta is listed as "not threatened" by the Government of Western Australia Department of Biodiversity, Conservation and Attractions.

== See also ==
- List of Acacia species
