= Eucalyptus costuligera =

Conservation status
- Priority One — Poorly Known Taxa (DEC)

Scientific classification
- Kingdom: Plantae
- Clade: Embryophytes
- Clade: Tracheophytes
- Clade: Spermatophytes
- Clade: Angiosperms
- Clade: Eudicots
- Clade: Rosids
- Order: Myrtales
- Family: Myrtaceae
- Genus: Eucalyptus
- Species: E. costuligera

Binomial name
- Eucalyptus costuligera L.A.S.Johnson & K.D.Hill

Species of eucalyptus

Eucalyptus costuligera is a species of small tree that is endemic to the Kimberley region of Western Australia. It has short-fibrous or flaky bark on the trunk and branches, bluish, lance-shaped adult leaves, club-shaped flower buds in branched or unbranched inflorescences with the buds in groups of up to seven, creamy-white flowers and conical, cup-shaped or pear-shaped fruit.

== Description ==
Eucalyptus costuligera is a tree that typically grows to a height of 5–10 m (16–33 ft) and has persistent pale grey, fibrous or flaky "box"-type bark on the trunk and branches. The adult leaves are arranged alternately, the same grey-green or bluish colour on both sides, lance-shaped, 70–150 mm (2.8–5.9 in) long and 17–30 mm (0.67–1.18 in) wide on a channelled or flattened petiole up to 22 mm (0.87 in) long. The flower buds are arranged in groups of up to seven on a branched or unbranched peduncle 1–15 mm (0.039–0.591 in) long, the individual buds on a pedicel 2–6 mm (0.079–0.236 in) long. Mature flower buds are club-shaped, about 7 mm (0.28 in) long and 4 mm (0.16 in) wide with faint ribs along the sides. The operculum is hemispherical, about half as long as the floral cup. The flowers are a white-cream colour and the fruit is a woody cylindrical, cup-shaped or pear-shaped capsule 6–8 mm (0.24–0.31 in) long and 5–7 mm (0.20–0.28 in) wide with fine ribs along the sides and the valves enclosed below the rim.

== Taxonomy and naming ==
Eucalyptus costuligera was first formally described in 2000 by Lawrie Johnson and Ken Hill from a specimen collected 60 km (37 mi) from the Derby-Gibb River Road, on the road to Wyndham. The specific epithet (costuligera) is derived from the Latin costula, meaning "a costule or rib" (strictly the midrib of a fern frond) and -ger meaning "-bearing", referring to the finely ribbed fruit.

== Distribution and habitat ==
This eucalypt has a limited range but is abundant in a small area in the central Kimberley region of Western Australia, growing in savannah woodland in sandy to loamy soils over laterite.

== Conservation status ==
This species is classified as "Priority One" by the Government of Western Australia Department of Parks and Wildlife meaning that it is known from only one or a few locations which are potentially at risk.

== See also ==
- List of Eucalyptus species
