= Acacia areolata =

Conservation status
- Least Concern (IUCN 3.1)

Scientific classification
- Kingdom: Plantae
- Clade: Embryophytes
- Clade: Tracheophytes
- Clade: Spermatophytes
- Clade: Angiosperms
- Clade: Eudicots
- Clade: Rosids
- Order: Fabales
- Family: Fabaceae
- Subfamily: Caesalpinioideae
- Clade: Mimosoid clade
- Genus: Acacia
- Species: A. areolata

Binomial name
- Acacia areolata M.W.McDonald
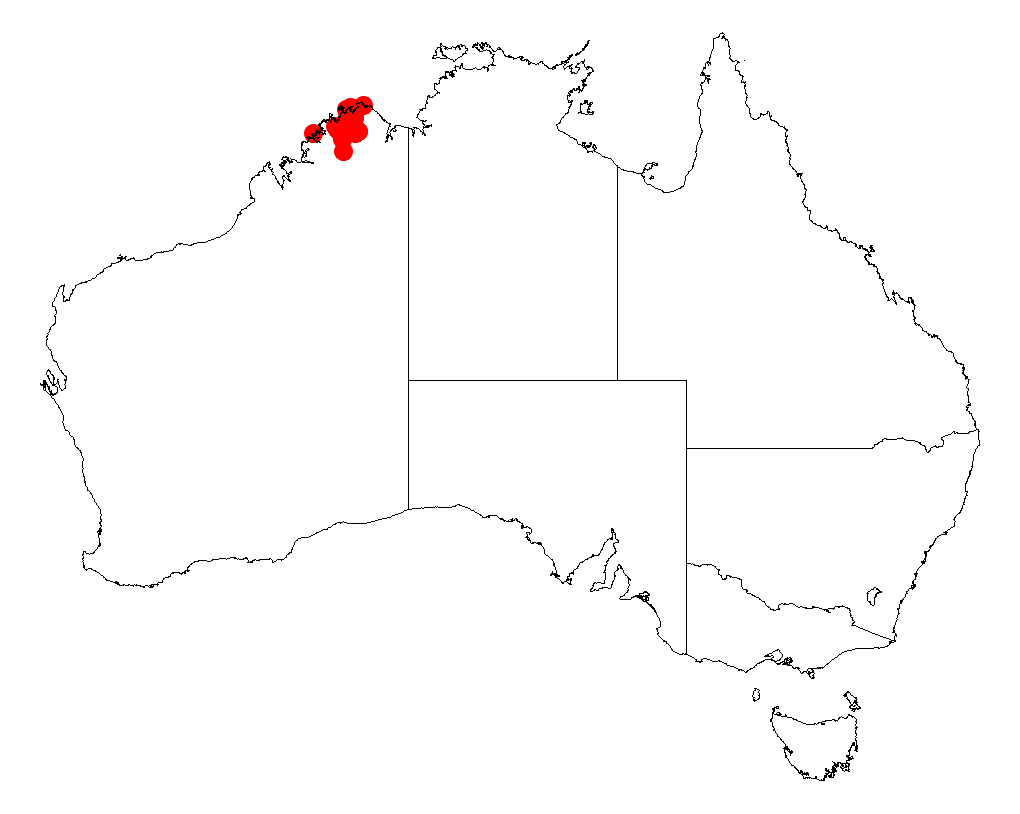
- Occurrence data from AVH

Synonyms
- Acacia affin retinervis; Racosperma areolatum (M.W.McDonald) Pedley

Species of legume

Acacia areolata is a species of flowering plant in the family Fabaceae and is endemic to the Northern Kimberley region of Western Australia. It is a spreading shrub with curved phyllodes, racemes of one or two spikes of yellow flowers in axils, and narrowly oblong to oblong pods up to 75 mm (3.0 in) long.

== Description ==
Acacia areolata is a spreading shrub that typically grows to a height of 2–4 m (6 ft 7 in – 13 ft 1 in), sometimes up to 8 m (26 ft) or rarely, prostrate. Its bark is grey-brown and fissured, the branchlets glabrous and rusty-brown. The phyllodes are usually straight, dimidiately elliptic to narrowly elliptic or egg-shaped, 60–120 mm (2.4–4.7 in) long, 20–40 mm (0.79–1.57 in) wide and glabrous, green or covered with a white, powdery bloom. The flowers are arranged in one or two spikes in axils, 20–45 mm (0.79–1.77 in) long with densely arranged yellow flowers. Flowering mostly occurs in June, and the fruit is a straight, narrowly oblong to oblong pod 25–75 mm (0.98–2.95 in) long and 9–15 mm (0.35–0.59 in) wide, containing compressed, broadly elliptic black seeds 6–7 mm (0.24–0.28 in) long.

== Taxonomy ==
Acacia areolata was first formally described in 2003 by Maurice W. McDonald in Australian Systematic Botany from specimens collected near the Carson Escarpment. The specific epithet (areolata) means areolate, meaning marked out into small, usually angular spaces between the minor veins on the phyllodes.

== Distribution and habitat ==
This species of wattle is native to an area of the Kimberley region of Western Australia, its range extending from around Cape Londonderry in the north down to around the Carson Escarpment, in the south in the Northern Kimberley bioregion of Western Australia. It usually grows in lateritic based or sandstone based soils in open woodland communities.

== See also ==
- List of Acacia species
