= Barton River (disambiguation) =

Barton River may mean the following rivers:

- Barton River (Vermont), United States
- Barton River (Western Australia)
