= Carson River (Western Australia) =

River in Western Australia

Coordinates: 14°25′59″S 126°38′04″E

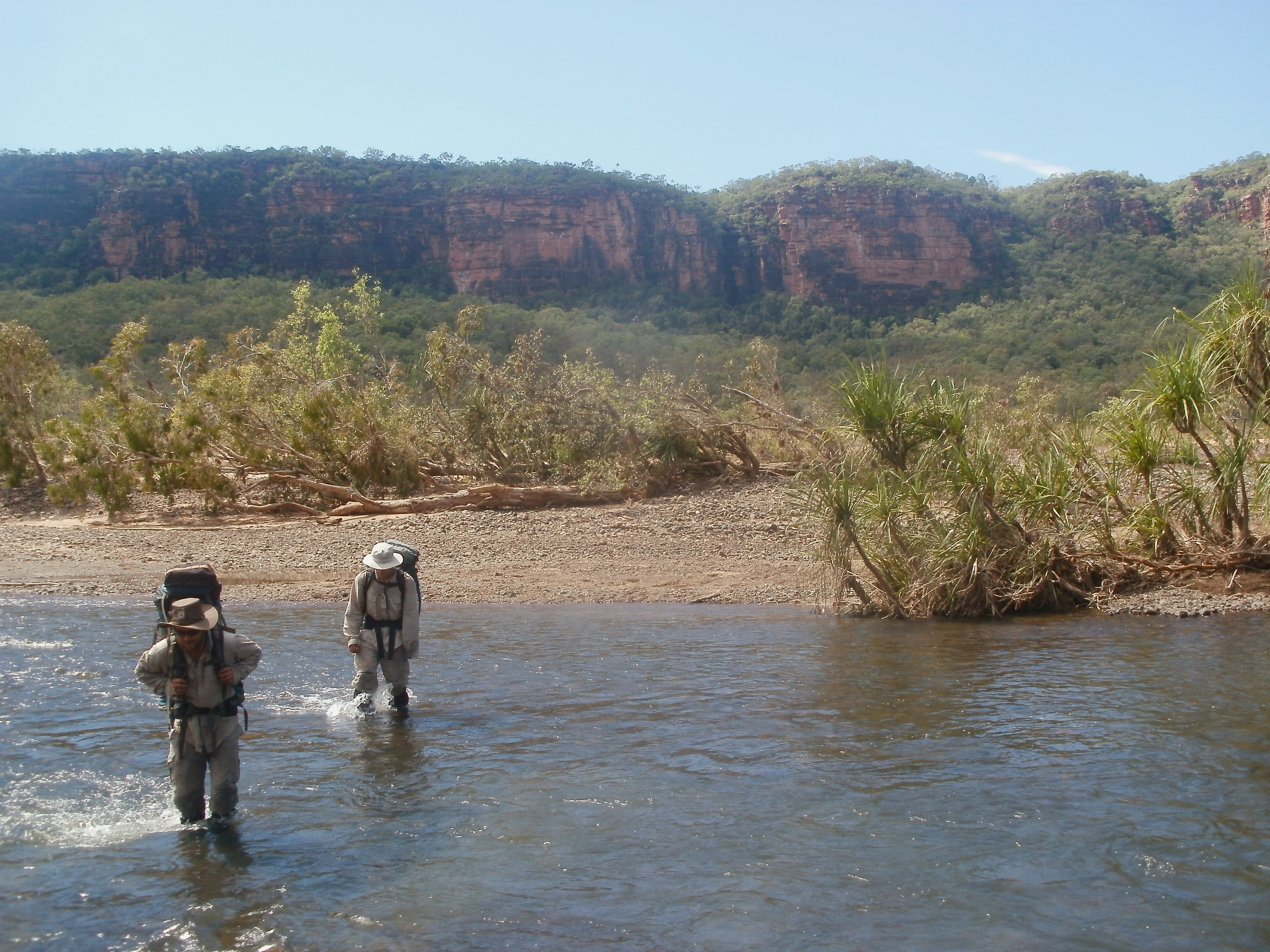
- Expedition crossing the river during the 2012 dry season

Location
- Country: Australia

Physical characteristics
- Source
  - location: below Foster Range
  - elevation: 300 metres (984 ft)
- Mouth
  - location: King Edward River
  - elevation: 36 metres (118 ft)
- Length: 155 km (96 mi)

The Carson River is a river in the Kimberley region of Western Australia.

== Geography ==
The headwaters of the river rise at the base of the Foster Range near the southwestern edge of the Drysdale River National Park. The river flows in a northerly direction along the Carson Escarpment and discharges into the King Edward River near Aragoon, about 12 kilometres (7 mi) south of Kalumburu. The river has four tributaries, including Morgan River, Swida Creek and Pronga-Marie Creek.

== History ==
The traditional owners of the areas around the river are the Wilawila, Miwa and Wunambal peoples. The river contains several permanent pools where examples of Indigenous Australian art, known as the Gwion Gwion rock paintings, can be found along the cliff faces.

The river was named in 1886 by the explorer Charles Burrowes while surveying the area for the Victoria Squatting Company. He named it after the chairman of the company, David Carson.
