= Barton River (Western Australia) =

River in Western Australia

Coordinates: 14°11′33″S 126°59′20″E

Location
- Country: Australia

Physical characteristics
- Source
  - location: Carson Escarpment
  - elevation: 68 metres (223 ft)
- Mouth
  - location: Drysdale River
  - elevation: 35 metres (115 ft)
- Length: 27 km (17 mi)

The Barton River is a river in the Kimberley region of Western Australia.

The headwaters of the river rise on the edge of the Carson Escarpment where it meets the Barton plain and flows in a westerly direction until it discharges into the Drysdale River, of which it is a tributary.

The traditional owners of the areas around the river are the Miwa people.

The river was named in 1901 by government surveyor Frederick Slade Drake-Brockman, after the first Prime Minister of Australia, Edmund Barton.
