= Eagle Falls (Kimberley) =

Waterfall in Western Australia

Coordinates: 17°50′53″S 126°36′32″E

- Interactive map of Eagle Falls
- Location: Kimberley, Western Australia
- Watercourse: Drysdale River

The Eagle Falls are on the Drysdale River in the Kimberley region of Western Australia.

They are regularly travelled to by helicopters associated with Kimberley coastal cruises.

They are not the only named waterfalls on the river - the largest are the Solea Falls just north of the Johnston Creek fork (this creek also has the Cracitus Falls); other named falls in the catchment include Bango Falls on the tributary Bango Creek.

Other significant waterfalls in the Kimberley region include the King George Falls east of the Drysdale catchment.
