= Kalumburu Road =

Road in Western Australia

Kalumburu Road Western Australia
- Kalumburu Road (blue and white)

General information
- Type: Rural road
- Length: 267 km (166 mi)

Major junctions

The Kalumburu Road in the Kimberley region of Western Australia is a 267 kilometre unsealed road that connects the Gibb River Road to the Aboriginal community of Kalumburu on the coast via the Mitchell Plateau. The road, which often becomes inaccessible during the wet season, is suitable for four-wheel drive traffic and facilities are limited to supplies available at the roadhouse at the Drysdale River Station. The road is known to be extremely corrugated in parts. Kalumburu Road runs north from the Gibb River Road, which it intersects approximately 250 km west of Kununurra. It also provides visitors access to Mitchell Falls.
