= Drysdale River =

River in Western Australia

Coordinates: 13°56′17″S 126°48′55″E

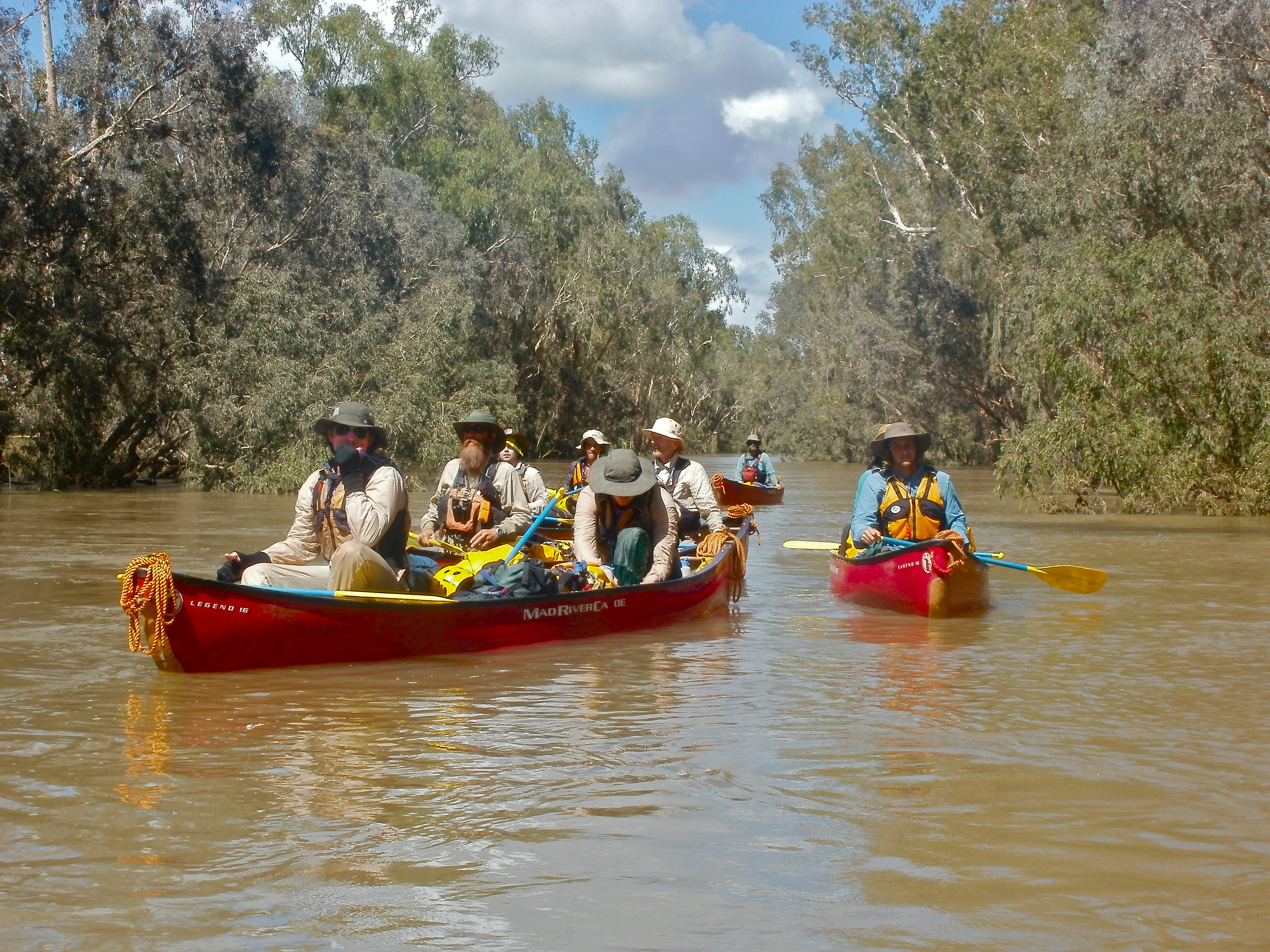
- A canoeing expedition on the Drysdale River

Location
- Country: Australia

Physical characteristics
- Source
  - location: Caroline Ranges
  - elevation: 329 metres (1,079 ft)
- Mouth
  - location: Napier Broome Bay
  - elevation: sea level
- Length: 432 kilometres (268 mi)
- Basin size: 26,019 square kilometres (10,046 sq mi)
- Discharge
  - average: 1,080,553 ML/a (34.2407 m^{3}/s; 1,209.197 cu ft/s)

The Drysdale River is a river in the Kimberley region of Western Australia.

The river rises in the Caroline Ranges, flows in a northerly direction and discharges into Napier Broome Bay near Kalumburu. The river contains several permanent pools, some of which have several examples of Indigenous Australian art known as Bradshaw paintings that can be found along the cliff faces.

Notable waterfalls on the river are the Eagle Falls, which are regularly visited by Kimberley coastal cruise ships, Solea Falls north of the Johnston Creek fork, and Bango Falls on the tributary Bango Creek.

There are 19 tributaries of the Drysdale, including Gibb River, Woodhouse River, Barton River, Tadarida Creek, Wax Creek, Curlew Creek, King David Creek, Ubach Creek and Damper Creek.

15% of the river's catchment area lies within Drysdale River National Park.

The river was named after a director of the Victorian Squatting Company, Thomas Andrew Drysdale, by the company's surveyor Charles Burrowes, in 1886.

The traditional owners of the area that the river flows through are the Ngarinjin, Miwa and Wilawila peoples.
