= Wilawila =

Indigenous Western Australian people

The Wilawila are an indigenous Australian tribe of the Kimberley region of Western Australia.

== Name ==
Norman Tindale gave "wilawila" as the proper tribal ethnonym, but noted that, according to reports by the missionary Theodore Hernández, the same group appeared to bear an alternative ethnonym, namely "Taib", which Tindale took to be a Wilawila horde.

== Country ==
According to Tindale, the Wilawila's tribal domains extended over 5,300 square miles (14,000 km^{2}), along and around the Carson and middle Drysdale rivers, stretching from Mount Connelly as far south as the lower Gibb and Durack rivers.

== Social organization ==
The Wilawila were divided into tribal subgroupings or clans/hordes, of which the following names survive.

- Taib (Carson river)
- Munumbara (Headwaters of the Forrest River)
- Kalari (Middle Drysdale River)
- Andedja (Southern tributaries of upper Forrest River)
- Piarngongo (Mount Beatrice)

Tindale also speaks of a Wilawila group, the Tjawurungari/Tawandjangango, on the Osborne Islands, speaking a lighter dialect of the language spoken by the Kambure.

== Alternative names ==
- Andedja
- Andidja, Andadja
- Kalari
- Karunjie
- ? Kundjanan, Kandjanan
- Munumbara
- Munumburu
- Piarngongo
- Taib
- Taibange (Taib member)
- ? Ullumbuloo
- Wular (language name)
- Wulu

Source: Tindale 1974, p. 261

== Sources ==
- "AIATSIS map of Indigenous Australia". AIATSIS. 14 May 2024.
- Hernández, Theodore (March 1941a). "Social organization of the Drysdale River tribes". Oceania. 11 (3): 212–232. JSTOR 40327901.
- Hernández, Theodore (December 1941b). "Children among the Drysdale River Tribes". Oceania. 12 (2): 122–133. doi:10.1002/j.1834-4461.1941.tb00350.x. JSTOR 40327939.
- Kaberry, Phyllis M. (June 1935). "The Forrest River and Lyne River Tribes of North-West Australia: A Report on Field Work". Oceania. 5 (4): 408–436. doi:10.1002/j.1834-4461.1935.tb00163.x. JSTOR 40327811.
- "Tindale Tribal Boundaries" (PDF). Department of Aboriginal Affairs, Western Australia. September 2016. Archived from the original (PDF) on 8 March 2016.
- Tindale, Norman Barnett (1974). "Wilawila (WA)". Aboriginal Tribes of Australia: Their Terrain, Environmental Controls, Distribution, Limits, and Proper Names. Australian National University. ISBN 978-0-708-10741-6. Archived from the original on 20 March 2020.
