= Gwion Gwion rock paintings =

Rock art in Western Australia

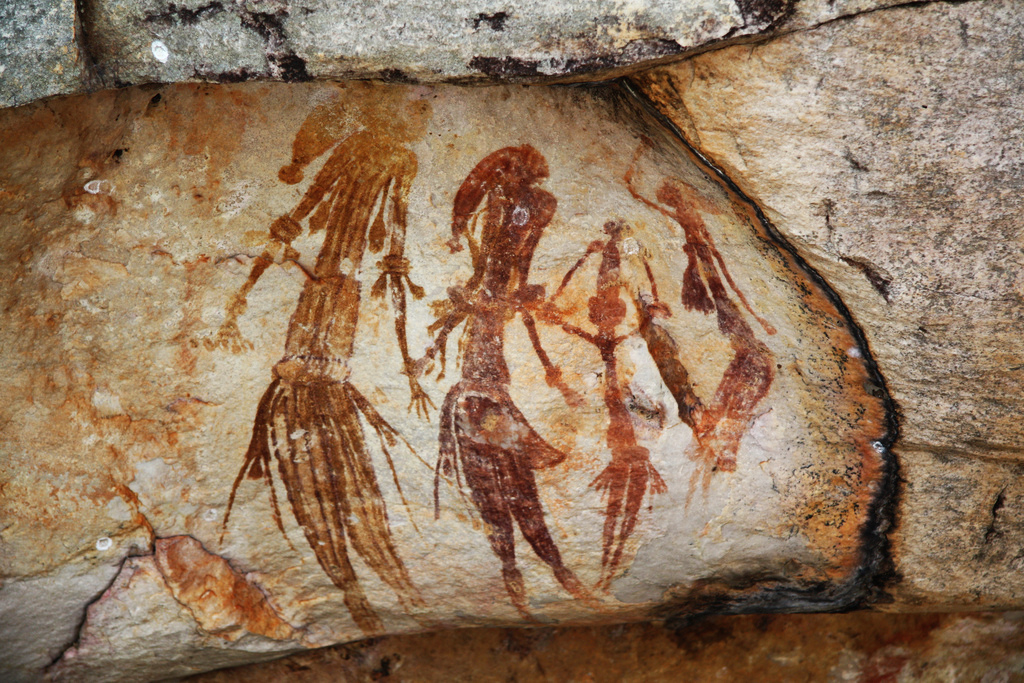
Gwion Gwion (Tassel) figures wearing ornate costumes

The Gwion Gwion rock paintings, Gwion figures, Kiro Kiro or Kujon (also known as the Bradshaw rock paintings, Bradshaw rock art, Bradshaw figures and the Bradshaws) are one of the two major regional traditions of rock art found in the north-west Kimberley region of Western Australia. Key traditional owners have published their own account of the meaning of the images. However the identity of the artists and the age of the art are contested within archaeology and amongst Australian rock art researchers. A 2020 study estimates that most of the anthropomorphic figures were created 12,000 years ago, based on analysis of painted-over wasps' nests. These aspects have been debated since the works were seen, and recorded, in 1891 by pastoralist Joseph Bradshaw, after whom they were named until recent decades. As the Kimberley is home to many traditional owners, the rock art is referred to and known by many different names in the local languages, the most common of which are Gwion Gwion or Kiro Kiro/Giro Giro. The art consists primarily of human figures ornamented with accessories such as bags, tassels and headdresses.

== Gwion Gwion art ==
Amateur archaeologist Grahame Walsh began work there in 1977 and returned to record and locate new sites up until his death in 2007. The results of this work produced a database of 1.5 million rock art images and recordings of 1,500 new rock art sites. He expanded his records by studying superimposition and style sequences of the paintings to establish a chronology that demonstrated that Gwion Gwion art is found early in the Kimberley rock art sequence. He proposed that the art dated to a period prior to the Pleistocene. Many of the ancient rock paintings maintain vivid colours because they have been colonised by bacteria and fungi, such as the black fungus, Chaetothyriales. The pigments originally applied may have initiated an ongoing, symbiotic relationship between black fungi and red bacteria.

Based on stylistic characteristics, Walsh categorised two individual styles of Gwion paintings, which he named "Tassel" and "Sash" for dominant clothing features. He also identified two variants, which he named "Elegant Action figures" and "Clothes Peg figures".

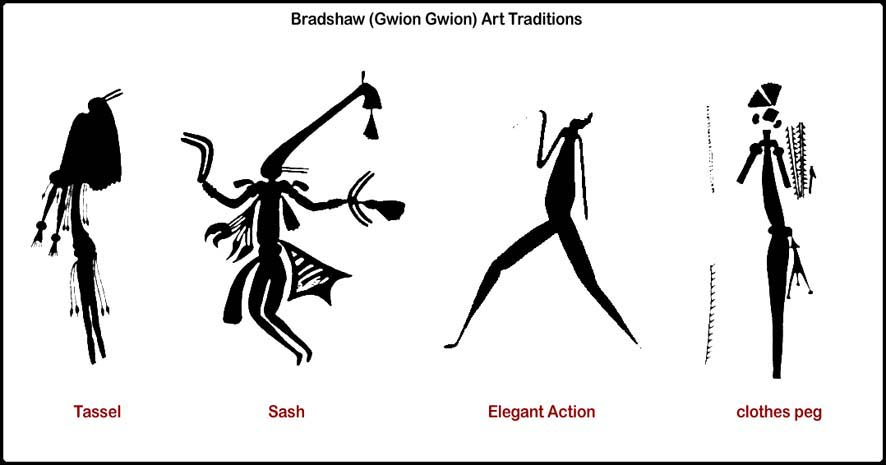
Drawings of Gwion Gwion rock paintings in the Kimberley region of Western Australia depicting the four traditional styles (resized for comparison)

- Tassel figures: identified by their characteristic tassels hanging from their arms and waists, various other accessories can be recognised, such as arm bands, conical headdresses and boomerangs. This style is the earliest, most detailed and largest.
- Sash: while similar in appearance to the Tassel figures, the Sash body is depicted more robustly and the accoutrements depicted are slightly different: a three-pointed sash or bags attached to the figures' belts begin to be shown.
- Elegant Action figures: quite different from the Tassel and Sash figures, these figures are almost always shown running, kneeling or hunting with multi-barbed spears and boomerangs. These are difficult to place in the style sequence as they are the only figures that are not superimposed over a painting from another period. Also, no other style is superimposed over them and they are the only style that has not been defaced. Stylistically, they are believed to fall between the Sash and Clothes Peg figures.
- Clothes Peg figures: were named by Walsh after their resemblance to old wooden clothes pegs, but they are also referred to as Straight Part Figures by Welch. These figures are depicted in a stationary pose and painted with red pigment. Segments of their bodies are missing, such as their waists, arms and feet, the result of different colour pigments, such as whites and yellows, fading over time. The material culture depicted with these figures includes multi-barbed spears, spear-throwers, and woven bags. This is the most recent style. The anatomical detail common in the earlier styles is missing, and many of the images are shown in aggressive stances. At least one panel shows a battle with opponents arrayed in ranks opposite each other.

The distribution and stylistic range of these paintings is quite distinctive, and contrasts with the Wandjina tradition. While more common in some areas, such as the sandstone regions of the west and central Kimberley, isolated examples have also been found in several scattered locations in the east, such as the Napier Ranges, and at the far eastern border of the Kimberley. The art is primarily painted where a suitable rock shelter is found; in contrast with Wandjina art, which has a limited distribution restricted to isolated sites. Unlike Wandjina, Gwion Gwion art is rarely found on ceilings, rather vertical rock surfaces are used, high up in escarpments in shallower rock shelters with small overhangs and with irregular rocky floors not suitable for occupation.

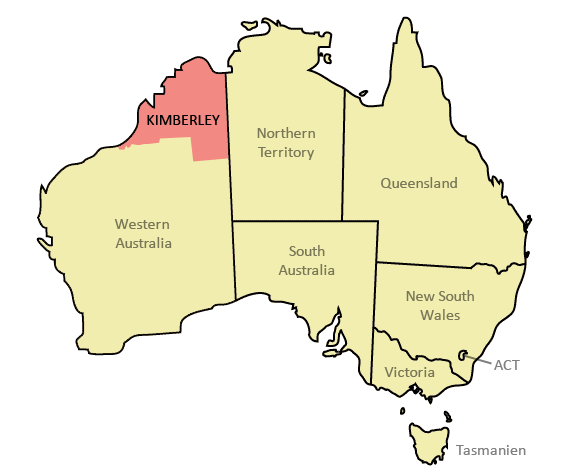
The Kimberley region of Western Australia.

The Gwion Gwion paintings predominantly depict human silhouette figures that appear to be suspended in the air or in a dynamic style that suggests running, hunting or dancing. While gender is rarely portrayed in the paintings, limb, arm and shoulder muscles are often well defined in addition to stomach paunches. The question of gender representation in Gwion Gwion art was illuminated recently by the discovery that figures are depicted as if they are facing into the rock face. This perspective has been overlooked until now because of the Western bias toward images that "face out", but also because the "facing in" perspective is more evident in depictions with excellent delineation of body contours, such as the rare Classic Realistic style, which is also earliest in superposition studies. If one appreciates the "facing in" perspective, it becomes evident that the many attributions of "paunches" are incorrect, both because they can now be seen to be located at the rear of these figures, but also because it is anatomically incorrect to attribute the belly to gluteal structures located more inferiorly. Furthermore, the figures are ornamented with a diversity of objects such as belts, headdresses, bags and tassels, while other material culture is sometimes depicted, such as boomerangs and wands. While Bradshaw initially described the colour of the art as having shades of pale blue and yellow, most figures have a deep purple-red hue, mulberry colour or a red to yellow-brown colour. However, Donaldson notes that there are rare examples of multi-coloured figures that retain some yellow and white pigment. The height of the art is variable; most are between 40 and 50 centimetres (16 and 20 in) in length with some examples up to 2 metres (6 ft 7 in) in height.

Artistically, Gwion Gwion are unusually advanced both in technique and style. Image processing has revealed that the outline of the figures are often painted first, then filled in. Engraving in the rock often follows the outlines of figures and may have served as a preliminary sketch which implies planning. Some faces of the figures are painted with anatomically correct features with enough detail to be considered portraits. Due to the fine detail and control found in the images, such as strands of hair painted in thicknesses of 1–2 millimetres (0.039–0.079 in), it has been suggested that feather quills may have been used as a technique to apply the paint to the rock walls; an imprint of a feather found at one site may support this possibility. No evidence has yet been found of any corrections or changes in composition during or after painting, while evidence of restoration has been found. In a detailed study of 66 panels, approximately 9% of the images have clearly been vandalized. Some were scratched with stones, some damaged by thrown stones, and some have been broken by hammering with large rocks.

With the exception of Elegant Action figures which have been left undamaged for unknown reasons, all Gwion Gwion paintings exhibit possible vandalism, which may indicate ritual mutilation or defacing. Superpositioning of images, another form of vandalism, is common throughout the Kimberley.

== Dating ==
The Gwion Gwion are not the region's earliest paintings. The earlier art consists of crude animal drawings that are believed to be up to 40,000 years old. The Gwion Gwion have nothing in common with this earlier art and first appeared following the peak of the most recent Pleistocene glacial maximum, which is dated between 26,500 and 20,000 years ago.

Since the mid-1990s, scientific dating methods have been used to determine the ages of the Gwion Gwion paintings. The methods have included accelerator mass spectrometry radiocarbon dating (AMS) and optically stimulated luminescence (OSL). This was used when mud wasp nests have been built over paintings, and it gives a minimum age rather than an actual age of the painting. The results of this have revealed some inconsistency with Walsh's chronology. Experimental OSL dates from a wasp nest overlaying a tassel Gwion Gwion figure has given a Pleistocene date of 17,500 ± 1,800 years BP. The academic community generally accepts 5,000 BP for the end of the artistic style. If the date ranges are correct, this may demonstrate that the Gwion Gwion tradition was produced for many millennia. Geoarchaeologist, Alan Watchman posits that the red paint used on a tasselled Gwion Gwion image near the Drysdale River is "likely to be only about 3,000 years old." Using the AMS results from accreted paint layers containing carbon associated with another figure, gives a date of 3,880 BP making Gwion Gwion art contemporaneous with, and no older than, Wanjina art. Around 15,000 years ago, the archaeological record shows that Aboriginals in the Kimberleys began using stone points in place of multi-barbed spears, but there is no record of this change of technology in the Gwion Gwion paintings. The most recent paintings still depict the use of multi-barbed spears.

In 2008, rock art depicting what is thought to be a Thylacoleo was discovered on the north-western coast of the Kimberley. This represented only the second example of megafauna depicted by the Indigenous inhabitants of Australia. The image has a "clothes peg" Gwion Gwion superimposed over the thorax, while a "Tassel" Gwion Gwion crosses the forearm of the animal. In 2009, a second image was found that depicts a Thylacoleo interacting with an "elegant action" Gwion Gwion who is in the act of spearing or fending the animal off with a multibarbed spear. Much smaller and less detailed than the 2008 find, it may depict a thylacine, however, the comparative size and morphology indicates a Thylacoleo is more likely, a position supported by palaeontologists and archaeologists who have examined the image. As the Thylacoleo is believed to have become extinct 45,000–46,000 years ago, this suggests a similar age for the associated Gwion Gwion art. Archaeologist Kim Akerman however believes that the megafauna may have persisted later in wetter areas of the continent as suggested by Wells, and has suggested an age of 15,000 to 22,000 years for the paintings.

Recent advances in dating methods may shed light on the age of the paintings and gain a more accurate result. Neuroscientist Jack Pettigrew has proposed dating the art by using DNA sequencing extracted from colonies of microorganisms which have replaced the pigment in some paintings.

== Indigenous knowledge ==
Research undertaken in relation to Aboriginal knowledge has also increased. This has primarily been seen in Aboriginal names being applied to the paintings, reflecting the specific Aboriginal languages used in the areas where they are found. For example, the Ngarinyin name for the art is Gwion Gwion. Other terms include giro giro used by Aboriginal people in the Napier, Broome Bay and Prince Regent River. Australian rock art researcher David Welch notes that these words are probably different regional accents of Kujon, the name of the bird found in the creation story originally heard by Schultz in 1938. Aboriginal people are also more open in telling foreigners stories regarding the images. These stories often relate to spirits who created dances which are still performed today and feature similar apparel found in the paintings, such as headdresses, boomerangs and string. Bradshaws (Gwion Gwion) are also depicted in contemporary art works produced for sale in the Kimberley; one notable Gwion Gwion artist is Kevin Waina.

== Colonial discovery and study ==
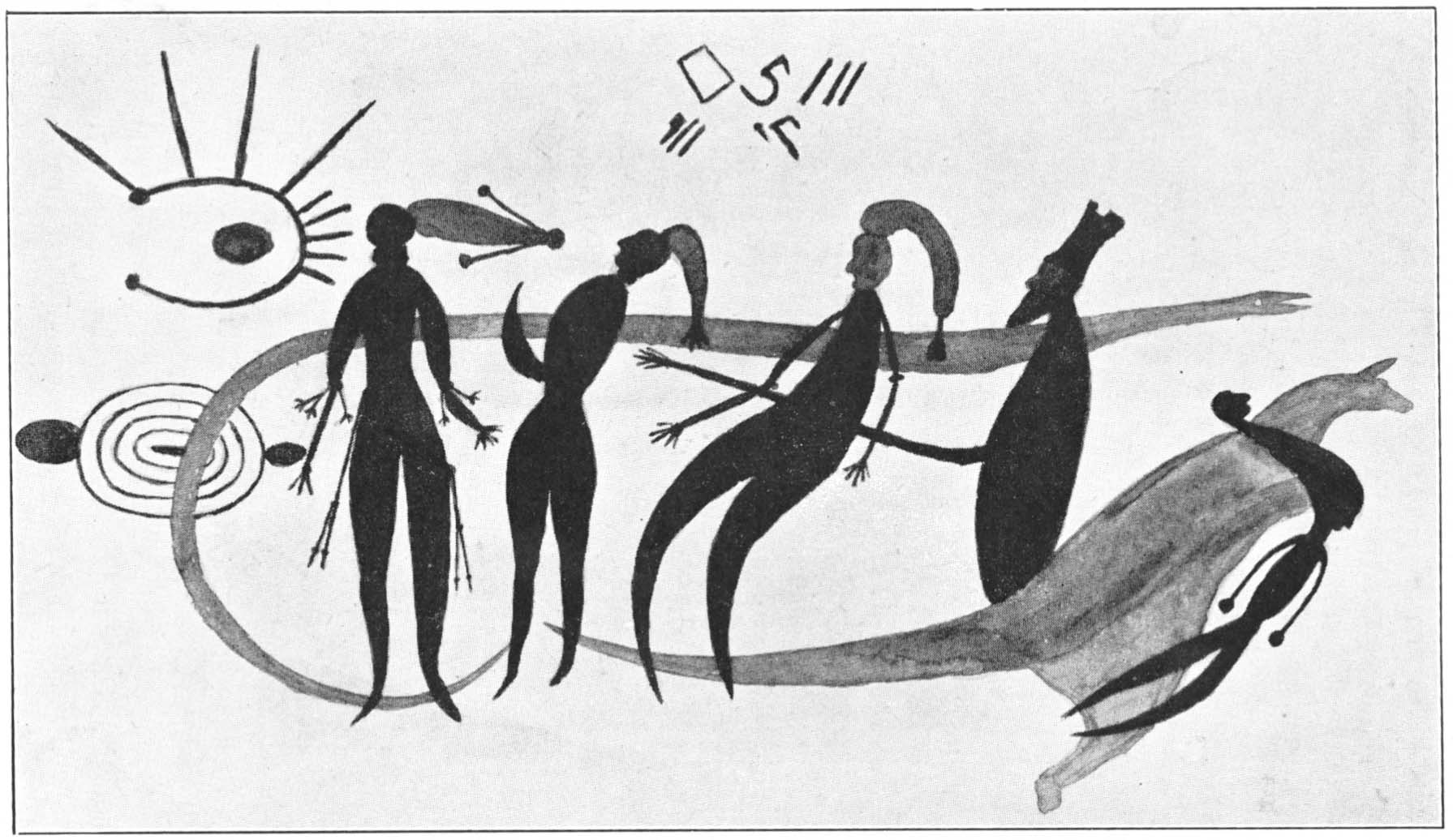
Gwion Gwion figures superimposed over a kangaroo and snake. Prince Regent River area of the Kimberley. Drawn by Joseph Bradshaw in April 1891 Backburning has since largely destroyed the original painting.

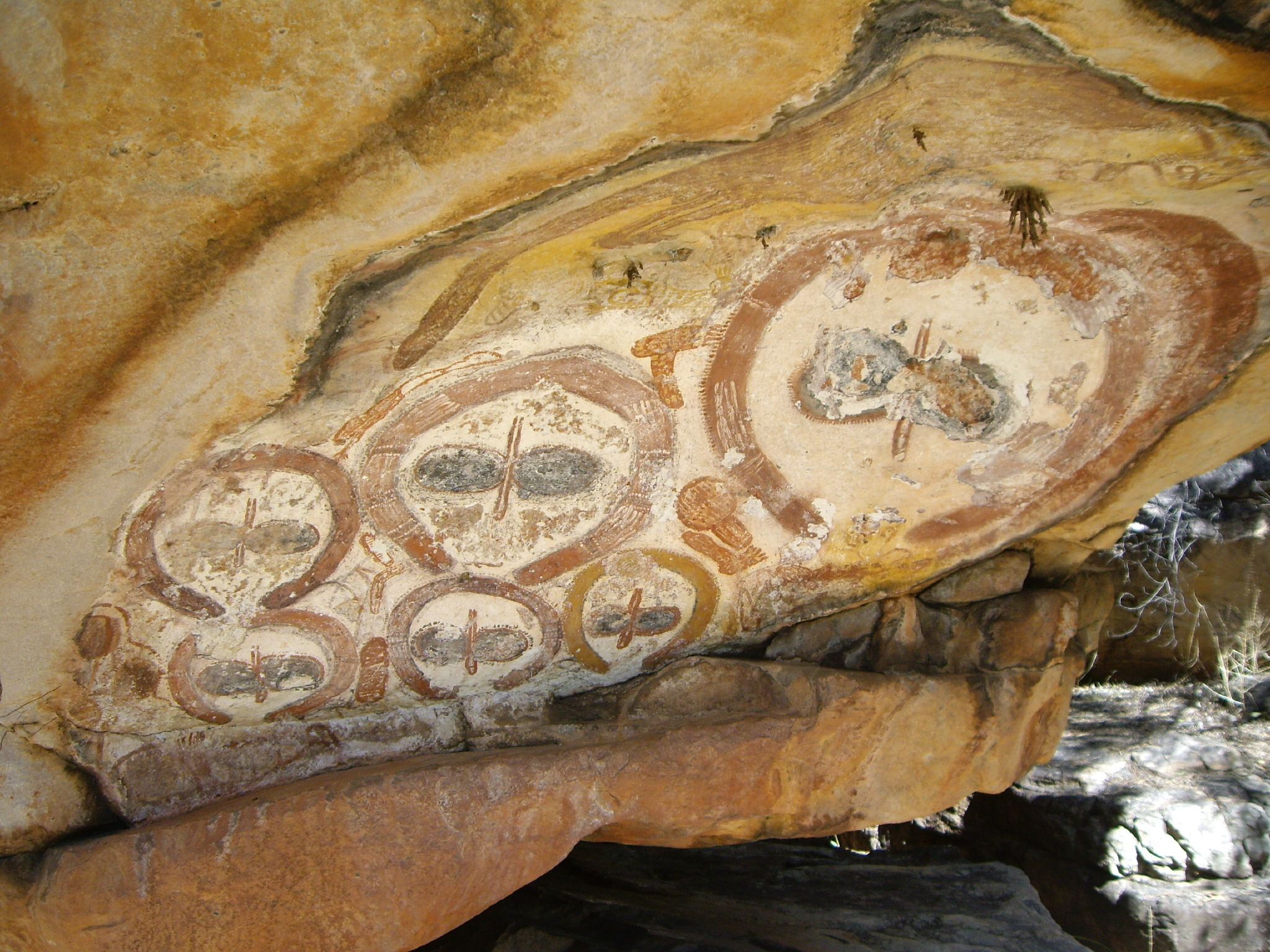
Indigenous Australian rock art in the later Wandjina style

Rock art in the Kimberley region was first recorded by colonial explorer and future South Australian governor, George Grey as early as 1838. This rock art is now known as Wandjina style art.

While searching for suitable pastoral land in the then remote Roe River area in 1891, pastoralist Joseph Bradshaw documented an unusual type of rock art on a sandstone escarpment. Bradshaw recognised that this style of painting was unique when compared to the Wandjina style. In a subsequent address to the Victorian branch of the Royal Geographical Society, he commented on the fine detail, the colours, such as brown, yellow and pale blue, and he compared it aesthetically to that of Ancient Egypt.

American archaeologist Daniel Sutherland Davidson briefly commented on the figures while undertaking a survey of Australian rock art that he would publish in 1936. Davidson noted that Bradshaw's encounter with this art was brief and lacked any Aboriginal interpretations; furthermore, as Bradshaw's sketches of the art were at this time the only visual evidence, Davidson argued that they could be inaccurate and possibly drawn from a Eurocentric bias. The figures and their existence as an artistic tradition was questioned; articles and books on these works were not published until the 1950s. The rediscovery of the original mural after more than a century has shown that Bradshaw had a remarkable gift for reproduction without photography, and that Davidson's criticisms were unfounded in the absence of the original. With the growth of anthropological interest in Peninsula region, research in the coastal area brought with it an awareness of Aboriginal art and culture. However, attention to the Gwion Gwion art was sporadic. Several researchers who encountered the Gwion-type of paintings during expeditions to the region were members of the 1938 Frobenius Institute expedition. Agnes Schultz noted that unlike with Wandjina art, Aboriginal people showed little interest in the Gwion Gwion paintings, although they recognised them as depictions of bush spirits or D'imi.

When pressed, the expedition's Aboriginal guide explained their creation:

"Long ago Kujon a black bird, painted on the rocks. He struck his bill against the stones so that it Bleed, and with the blood he painted. He painted no animals, only human-shaped figures which probably represent spirits."

Anthropologist Robert Layton notes that researchers such as Ian Crawford, who worked in the region in 1969, and Patricia Vinnicombe, who worked in the region in the 1980s, were both told similar creation stories regarding the Gwion-type art. Since 1980, more systematic work has been done in an effort to identify more Gwion Gwion rock art sites in the Kimberley.

=== Research ===
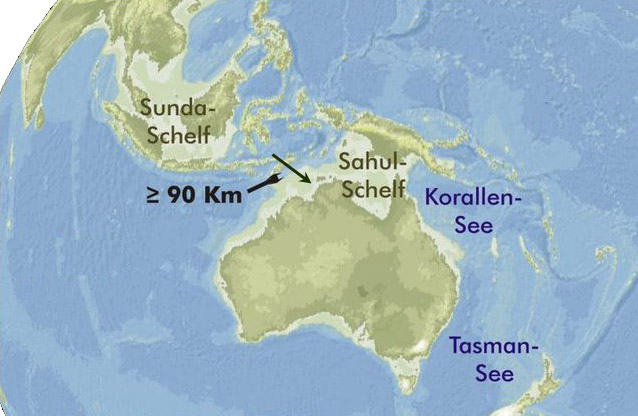
Map showing the probable extent of land at the time of the last glacial maximum 25,000 to 15,000 years ago

The fossil record of climate and vegetation at the last glacial maximum is sparse, but still clear enough to provide an overview. When the Kimberley region was first occupied circa 40,000 years ago, the region consisted of open tropical forests and woodlands. After around 10,000 years of stable climatic conditions, temperatures began cooling and winds became stronger, leading to the beginning of an ice-age. During the glacial maximum, 25,000 to 15,000 years ago, the sea level was some 140 metres (460 ft) below its present level, with the coastline extending 400 kilometres (250 mi) further to the north-west. Australia was connected to New Guinea, and the Kimberley was separated from southeast Asia (Wallacea) by a strait approximately 90 kilometres (56 mi) wide. Rainfall decreased by 40% to 50% depending on region, while the lower CO_{2} levels (half pre-industrial levels) meant that vegetation required twice as much water to photosynthesize. The Kimberley region, including the adjacent exposed continental Sahul Shelf, was covered by vast grasslands, while woodlands and semi-arid scrub covered the shelf joining New Guinea to Australia. Southeast of the Kimberley, from the Gulf of Carpentaria to northern Tasmania the land, including the western and southern margins of the now exposed continental shelves, was covered by extreme deserts and sand dunes. It is believed that no more than 15% of Australia supported trees of any kind. While some tree cover remained in the southeast of Australia, the vegetation of the wetter coastal areas in this region was semi-arid savannah. Tasmania was covered primarily by cold steppe and alpine grasslands, with snow pines at lower altitudes. There is evidence that there may have been a significant reduction in Australian Aboriginal populations during this time. It appears there were scattered "refugia" in which the modern vegetation types and human populations were able to survive. With the end of the ice-age, the Kimberley region settled into a tropical monsoon climate until a major El Niño–Southern Oscillation event in the mid Holocene caused the Australian summer monsoon rains to weaken or fail for some 1,500 years.

The discontinuity in artistic styles between the earlier Gwion Gwion and the current Wandjina has been attributed to the severe drought phase that followed the collapse of the wet season in 5,500 BP. The Gwion Gwion style art ended around this time, possibly within 500 years. The emergence of Wandjina art depicting cloud and rain spirits 3,800 to 4,000 years ago coincides with the end of the "mega-drought" and a return of the rain which gave the region its current climate. The research paper's lead author, Hamish McGowan, suggests further investigation into the resulting cultural collapse and the possibility that another ethnic group supplanted the Gwion Gwion artists. The chair in Kimberley rock art at the University of Western Australia Peter Veth criticised the research paper for claiming that simultaneous changes in climate patterns and art styles indicates the collapse of a culture. Veth suggested that a climate change coinciding with the change from Gwion Gwion to Wandjina art is coincidence, pointing out that the archaeology of the Kimberley does not show a break in occupation, and that stylistic changes in Aboriginal art have occurred elsewhere in Australia. Additionally, the migration of a new ethnic group into the area is unsupported by the linguistics.

== Controversies ==
Research concerning Gwion Gwion art is controversial and little consensus has been reached. Debate has primarily concerned Walsh's interpretations regarding the origins, dating and ethnicity of the Gwion Gwion artists, and his rejection of Aboriginal people as being their descendants. The implications of his interpretations generated considerable criticism beginning in the mid-1990s due to its continuing potential to undermine native title claims in the Kimberley. The ongoing disagreements regarding the age of the art and debate about whether it was created by non-Indigenous people makes Gwion Gwion rock art one of Australian archaeology's most contentious topics.

=== Exotic or local artists ===
According to Walsh, Gwion Gwion art was associated with a period he called the Erudite Epoch, a time before Aboriginal people populated Australia. He suggested that the art may be the product of an ethnic group who had likely arrived in Australia from Indonesia, only to be displaced by the ancestors of present-day Aboriginal people. Walsh based this interpretation on the sophistication of Gwion Gwion art when compared to other art in the Kimberley region, such as the much later Wandjina styles.

Media coverage has at times emphasised his claims of mysterious races. Pettigrew suggests that the Gwion Gwion paintings depict people with 'peppercorn curls' and small stature that characterise San groups; he speculates that African people travelled, shortly after the Toba eruption some 70,000 years ago, by reed boat across the Indian Ocean, provisioning themselves with the fruit of the baobab tree. The Australian archaeological community has generally not accepted such claims and believes that Gwion Gwion are indigenous works. For example, Dr Andrée Rosenfeld argued that the aesthetics of the art did not support claims for a non-Aboriginal origin when comparison is made to the aesthetic value of contemporary Aboriginal art. The Australian Archaeological Association in a press release stated, "No archaeological evidence exists which suggests that the early colonisation of Australia was by anyone other than the ancestors of contemporary Aboriginal people", the release quoted Claire Smith: "such interpretations are based on and encourage racist stereotypes".

Aboriginal people also criticised Grahame Walsh, arguing that he failed to hear their explanations of the significance that the paintings had in their culture. Crawford records being told by an Aboriginal elder in 1969 that the Gwion Gwion were "rubbish paintings", a quote that Walsh would repeat continually in support of his own theory that the art was not of Aboriginal origin. In the local Indigenous English, rubbish is an adjective usually used to describe someone who is too old or too young to be active in the local culture. Another use is meaning something is not dangerous, for example, non-venomous snakes are all considered to be rubbish while in contrast, venomous snakes are all cheeky.

Scholars have generally rejected the idea that Gwion Gwion art was painted by anyone other than Aboriginal people. Statistical analysis undertaken by Michael Barry has concluded that the Gwion Gwion art shares no stylistic attributes with prehistoric figurative art overseas. Moreover, Barry argues that stylistically, Gwion Gwion art has more in common with art found elsewhere in Australia, such as figures painted in Arnhem Land. Some popular historians and amateur researchers have continued to suggest exotic origins for the Gwion Gwion rock paintings, although these interpretations are considered fringe by reviewers.

=== Depictions of shamanistic rituals ===
In many cases, Tassel and Sash figures appear to be involved in either dancing, ecstatic behaviour, or both which, according to a study by Michaelson et al., may represent shamanistic rituals or creation ceremonies. Eucalyptus leaves (which can be used as a psychoactive drug) are commonly depicted with Tassel and Sash figures that appear to be in motion.

Michaelson et al. cited studies by A. P. Elkin in which he argued that Aboriginal and Tibetan shamanism have markedly close similarities. He also noted that the worldwide pattern of shamanism suggests a common heritage that radiated outward from North Africa about 50,000 years ago; it may have originated as a woman's role which over time has been taken over by men. Aboriginal women in Australia have explicitly been recorded as saying that men had taken over roles they once performed in ceremonies. This is supported by many completely different languages having a similar word for women shamans (e.g., udaghan, udagan, utygan), while the term for male shamans is distinct in each language. Michaelson considered it significant that while few women are depicted in Gwion Gwion art, Tassel figures which appear to be leading ceremonies (the oldest art) clearly have breasts, in contrast to later art which depicts males in the leading roles. Pettigrew identifies elements of Gwion Gwion art with symbols used by Sandawe artists to convey their experience with hallucinogens, and others that seem to show hallucinatory elements. From this he infers that psilocybin-induced trances were a feature of both cultures.

However, only a small number of researchers believe that shamanism has been part of the culture of Indigenous Australians. George Chaloupka, an expert on Indigenous Australian rock art, puts it bluntly, "Shamaniacs rule the world at present...It's just another orthodoxy basking in its five minutes of sunshine." Grahame Walsh considered the idea of women shamans in the Gwion Gwion culture "preposterous". Pointing out that women Gwion Gwion images tend to have extremely prominent breasts, Walsh says that the smaller breasts identified by Michaelson are probably chest-band decorations.

=== Destruction ===
Aerial fire-bombing and back burning by the Western Australian Department of Parks and Wildlife and the Department of Fire and Emergency Services since 2009 as part of the government's fire prevention strategy has caused paint to peel from over 5,000 of the 8,742 known examples of Gwion Gwion art. A survey by archaeologist Lee Scott-Virtue has determined that up to 30 per cent of the rock art had been completely destroyed by fire.

== See also ==
- Indigenous Australian art
- List of Stone Age art
- Prehistoric art
