= Gibb River =

River in Western Australia

Coordinates: 16°8′59″S 126°24′59″E

Location
- Country: Australia

Physical characteristics
- Source
  - location: Caroline Range
  - elevation: 466 metres (1,529 ft)
- Mouth
  - location: Drysdale River
  - elevation: 369 metres (1,211 ft)
- Length: 112 km (70 mi)

The Gibb River is a river in the Kimberley region of northern Western Australia.

The headwaters of the river rise between the Caroline and Gibb Ranges. The river flows in a northerly direction until merging with the Drysdale River, of which it is a tributary. Gibb River has three tributaries: North Creek, Plain Creek and Russ Creek.

The Gibb River was named in 1901 by the surveyor Charles Crossland during an expedition in the Kimberley area. It is named after geologist Andrew Gibb Maitland, who had accompanied Crossland and was present during the first recorded sighting of the river. In turn, it gives its name to the Gibb River Road, a former cattle route that stretches almost 660 kilometres (410 mi) across the Kimberley between the towns of Derby and the Kununurra and Wyndham junction of the Great Northern Highway.

The traditional owners of the area that the river flows through are the Ngarinjin people.
