= King Edward River =

River in Western Australia

Coordinates: 14°14′3″S 126°35′58″E

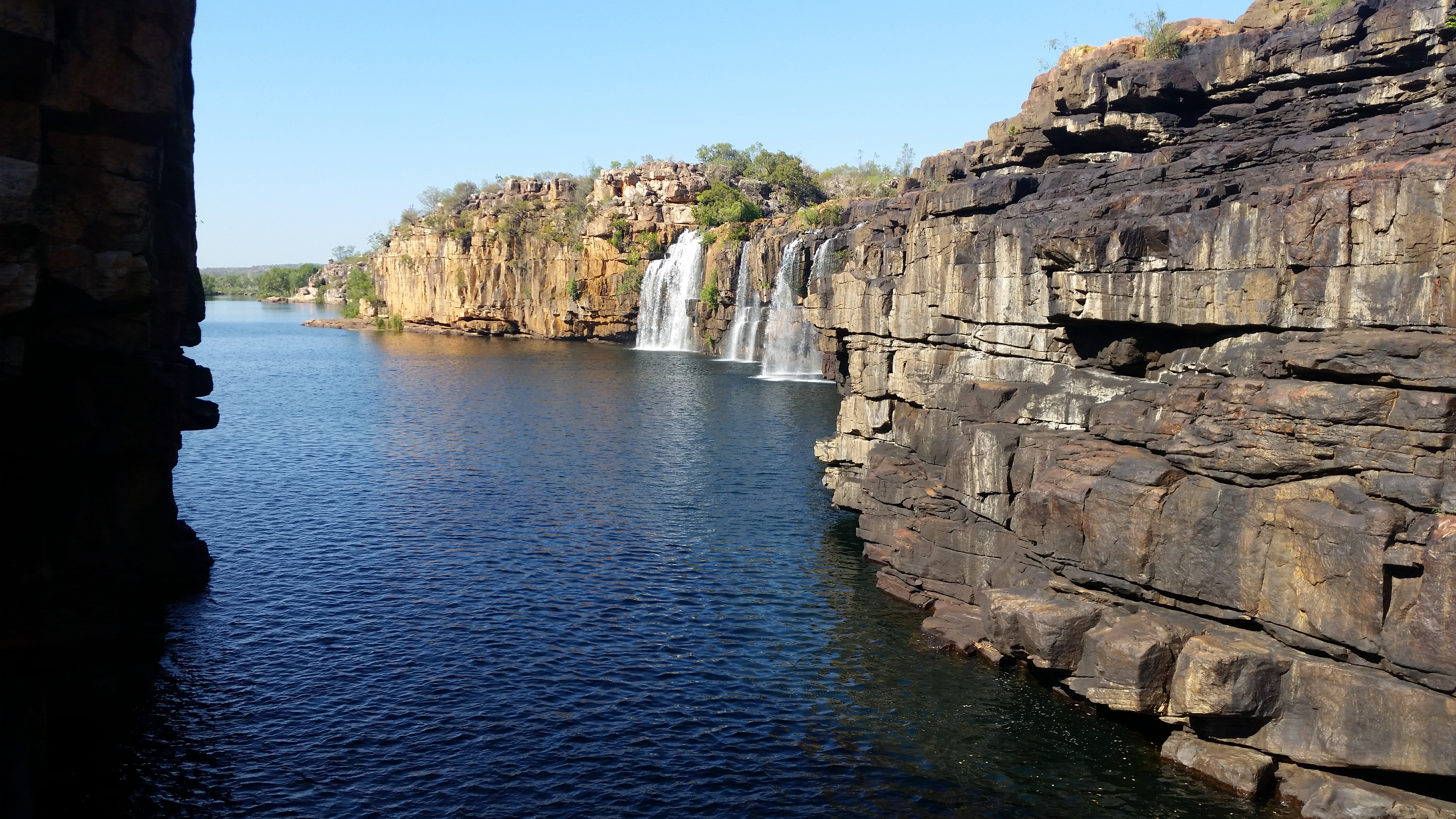

Location
- Country: Australia

Physical characteristics
- Source
  - location: Poonjurra Hill
  - elevation: 480 metres (1,575 ft)
- Mouth
  - location: Napier Broome Bay
  - elevation: sea level
- Length: 221 kilometres (137 mi)
- Basin size: 17,624 square kilometres (6,805 sq mi)

The King Edward River is a river in the Kimberley region of Western Australia.

The headwaters of the river rise below Poonjurra Hill and flows in a northerly direction almost parallel with the Kalumburu Road and eventually discharges into Deep Bay then Napier Broome Bay and finally the Indian Ocean.

The river has seven tributaries, including Carson River, Drum Creek, Noolawayoo Creek, Coondillah Creek and Hair Creek.

The river contains several permanent pools, where examples of Indigenous Australian art known as Bradshaw paintings can be found along the cliff faces.

The river was named in 1901 by the surveyor Frederick Brockman while on expedition in the area. The river is named after King Edward VII, the reigning monarch at the time.

The traditional owners of the areas around the river are the Miwa, Wunambal and Kambure peoples.
