= Prince Regent River =

River in Kimberley region of Western Australia

Coordinates: 15°27′06″S 125°04′07″E

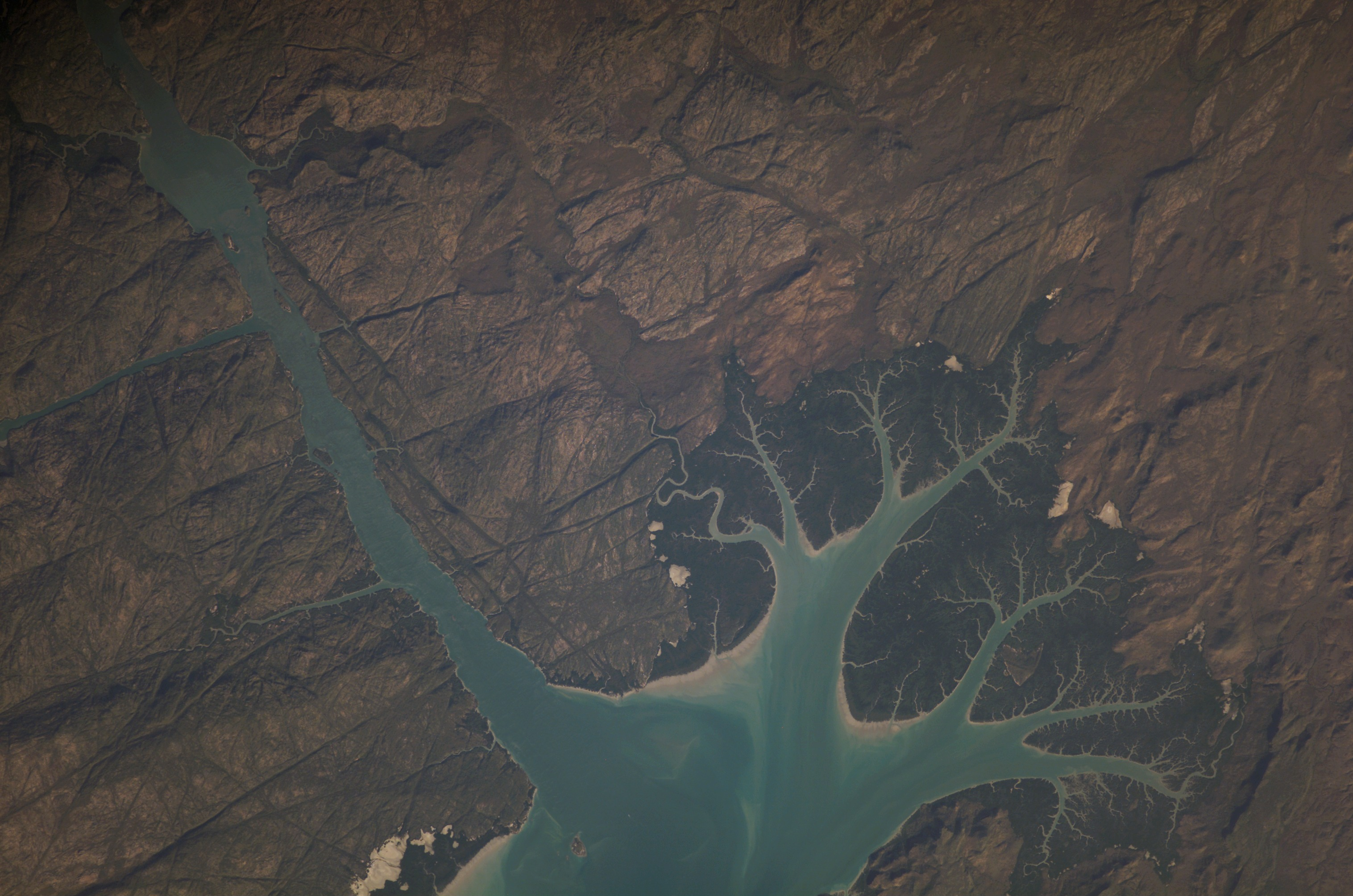
- Satellite image of the Prince Regent National Park, Prince Regent River and Saint George Basin taken by ISS Expedition 15

Location
- Country: Australia

Physical characteristics
- Source
  - location: Caroline Range
  - elevation: 550 metres (1,804 ft)
- Mouth
  - location: Indian Ocean
  - elevation: sea level
- Length: 106 km (66 mi)
- Basin size: 5,506 km^{2} (2,126 sq mi)

The Prince Regent River is a river in the Kimberley region of Western Australia.

The headwaters of the river rise in the Caroline Range near Mount Agnes then flow in a north westerly direction. The river enters and flows through the Prince Regent National Park and past King Cascade and finally discharging into Saint George Basin and Hanover Bay to the Indian Ocean.

The river runs a uniquely straight course following a fault line for the majority of its length.

The river has six tributaries, including Quail Creek, Youwanjela Creek, Womarama Creek and Pitta Creek.

The river was named in 1820 by the first European to find the river, Philip Parker King and the crew of Mermaid. The river is named after the Hanoverian prince, King George IV, who was shortly to succeed his father to the throne.

The first European to settle in the area was Joseph Bradshaw, who established Marigui homestead along the river with his cousin Aeneas Gunn in 1890. In 1891 he located the Gwion Gwion rock paintings. The pastoral venture was unsuccessful but Gunn later documented his memoirs of the time in the book Pioneering in Northern Australia.

The river was visited in 1901 by the surveyor Frederick Brockman while on expedition in the area.

The traditional owners of the area are the Worrorra people.

Eighteen freshwater fish species are known to inhabit the waters of the Prince Regent River. Golden bandicoots, monjon and saltwater crocodiles also inhabit this area.

== Crocodile attacks ==
- On 29 March 1987, an American 24-year-old model named Ginger Meadows was killed by a crocodile while swimming with four friends under the freshwater Cascades waterfall.
- In 2012, a tour operator was bitten on the leg while swimming in Dugong Bay, near Broome, by a crocodile, making it the first reported attack at the time.
- In 2015, a woman was attacked by a crocodile in a rockpool while swimming with a tour group.
