= Kalumburu, Western Australia =

Community in Western Australia

Kalumburu
- Town
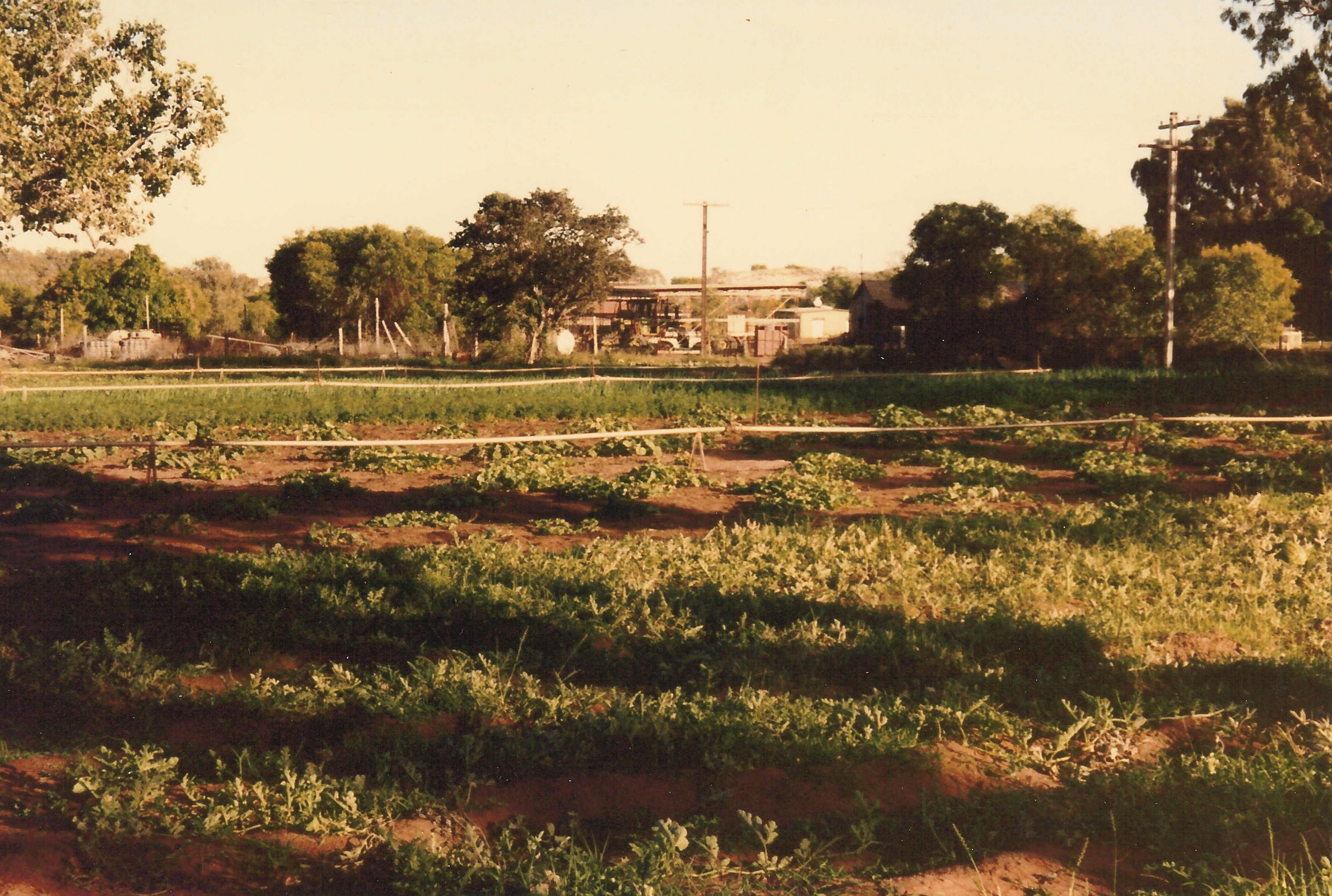
- The mission garden at Kalumburu

- Interactive map of Kalumburu
- Coordinates: 14.295°S 126.642°E
- Country: Australia
- State: Western Australia
- LGA: Shire of Wyndham-East Kimberley
- Established: 1937

Government
  - State electorate: Kimberley
  - Federal division: Durack

Area
  - Total: 4.1 km^{2} (1.6 sq mi)
- Elevation: 23 m (75 ft)

Population
  - Total: 388 (SAL 2021)
- Postcode: 6740
- Mean max temp: 34.3 °C (93.7 °F)
- Mean min temp: 20.8 °C (69.4 °F)
- Annual rainfall: 1,217.3 mm (47.93 in)

Kalumburu (and Kalumburu Community, formerly Drysdale River Mission) are bounded localities within the Shire of Wyndham-East Kimberley in Western Australia (postcode 6740). Kalumburu Community is the northernmost settlement in Western Australia.

According to the 2011 census, it has a population of 412 people and is inhabited mostly by Aboriginal people from the Wunambal and Kwini language groups. Kalumburu Community is remote from any main roads – the nearest is the Gibb River Road, 270 km to the south via the Kalumburu Road. It was the site of a World War II airbase, which was attacked by Japanese planes in 1943.

== History ==
In 1905, the Order of Saint Benedict (OSB) decided to establish a mission near the Drysdale River. The mission was established in 1908, 20 kilometres north-east of the present site, at Pago, near the southern end of Napier Broome Bay, by Benedictine monks from New Norcia. In 1937, water supply problems forced the missionaries to move to the present site at Kalumburu Pool, on the King Edward River.

=== World War II ===
Following the outbreak of World War II, the Australian government commissioned an airfield at the mission. After Japanese forces occupied the Dutch East Indies in 1942, Drysdale became a frontline Royal Australian Air Force (RAAF) base, acting as a staging post for Allied squadrons based further south. The airfield was a refuelling and ammunition depot for the RAAF anti-submarine aircraft operating between Darwin and Fremantle. On 19 February, the mission provided assistance to the crew and passengers of the merchant vessel MV Koolama, which had been attacked by Japanese planes.

In February 1943, Allied signals intelligence suggested that Japanese aircraft would be built up in Timor for attacks on Darwin. Eight Beaufighters from No. 31 Squadron RAAF were despatched to Drysdale River, to prepare for a pre-emptive strike. On 28 February, it was confirmed that the enemy aircraft had arrived at Penfui, near Kupang. An early morning strike destroyed 12 Japanese aircraft on the ground and damaged another 10. Two Beaufighters were damaged by Japanese fighter aircraft but returned to Drysdale River.

On 27 September 1943, the base and settlement were attacked by 21 Japanese Kawasaki Ki-48 bombers, based at Kupang, Timor, with a fighter escort. The Superior of the mission, Father Thomas Gil O.S.B, aged 45 years, and five Aboriginal people ranging from the age of 1 to 45 years were killed. This included a mother and son. All victims were buried together on mission grounds, the Aboriginal people on either side of Father Thomas, following the funeral at the damaged church. Many buildings at the mission were also destroyed or severely damaged during the raid.

In April 1944, Flt Lt D. S. Askew, the commanding officer of No. 58 Operational Base Unit, reported 367 aircraft movements during that month, the busiest period since operations had begun. He also wrote: "Approximately 250 operational hours were flown from Drysdale resulting in approximately 60,000 lb of bombs being dropped on enemy territory".

The military significance of the airfield declined once Truscott Airfield was constructed, about 32 km (20 mi) north, in 1944.

=== Post-war ===
In 1951, Drysdale River Mission was officially renamed Kalumburu. Management of the community was later taken over by Kalumburu Aboriginal Corporation, on behalf of the Kalumburu Community Council. The community retains strong links with the OSB, including a priest and several Benedictine nuns.

=== Medical services ===
Kalumburu is 568 km via a poor quality road to the nearest hospital. During the dry season, this takes about 12 hours. There is a small clinic staffed by two remote area nurses with a visiting doctor once per week. This community has been extensively studied and is the subject of publications in regards to Aboriginal health (e.g. trachoma and kidney disease).

In 2008 a new clinic was being built, in collaboration with the Australian Army and Western Australia Health. There is provision for a small dialysis unit, although staffing and equipment are yet to be finalized.

The Royal Flying Doctor Service land on the Kalumburu strip to the north of the town. There is also the old Truscott Airbase which can be used in cases of emergency.

== Population ==
According to the 2021 census of Population, there were 388 people in Kalumburu.

- Aboriginal and Torres Strait Islander people made up 88.4% of the population.
- 92.3% of people were born in Australia and 81.2% of people spoke only English at home.
- The most common response for religion was Catholic at 83.8%.
- 10.6% of people stated that they finished year 12, with 14.4% of people stating they had finished school at a year 9 level or below.

== Town planning ==
Kalumburu Layout Plan No.2 was prepared in accordance with State Planning Policy 3.2 Aboriginal Settlements. Layout Plan No.2 was endorsed by the community in 2004 and the Western Australian Planning Commission in 2005. The layout plan map-set and background report can be viewed at Planning Western Australia's website.

== Climate ==
The Köppen–Geiger climate classification system classifies its climate as tropical savanna (Aw) with very hot daytime temperatures year round and cool winter nighttime temperatures.

Climate data for Kalumburu
Month	Jan	Feb	Mar	Apr	May	Jun	Jul	Aug	Sep	Oct	Nov	Dec	Year
Record high °C (°F)	40.3 (104.5)	39.8 (103.6)	40.1 (104.2)	40.2 (104.4)	39.0 (102.2)	37.3 (99.1)	38.3 (100.9)	39.6 (103.3)	41.4 (106.5)	43.4 (110.1)	42.1 (107.8)	42.9 (109.2)	43.4 (110.1)
Mean daily maximum °C (°F)	34.1 (93.4)	33.7 (92.7)	34.1 (93.4)	34.9 (94.8)	33.6 (92.5)	32.0 (89.6)	32.4 (90.3)	33.9 (93.0)	36.0 (96.8)	37.2 (99.0)	37.3 (99.1)	35.7 (96.3)	34.6 (94.3)
Mean daily minimum °C (°F)	24.7 (76.5)	24.4 (75.9)	23.7 (74.7)	21.2 (70.2)	17.0 (62.6)	14.6 (58.3)	13.9 (57.0)	14.9 (58.8)	19.4 (66.9)	22.8 (73.0)	24.8 (76.6)	25.1 (77.2)	20.5 (68.9)
Record low °C (°F)	21.0 (69.8)	20.2 (68.4)	17.3 (63.1)	11.4 (52.5)	7.0 (44.6)	4.5 (40.1)	5.0 (41.0)	6.8 (44.2)	8.4 (47.1)	14.7 (58.5)	19.5 (67.1)	21.0 (69.8)	4.5 (40.1)
Average rainfall mm (inches)	347.2 (13.67)	290.6 (11.44)	205.8 (8.10)	41.0 (1.61)	14.7 (0.58)	2.1 (0.08)	1.4 (0.06)	0.2 (0.01)	2.1 (0.08)	33.6 (1.32)	82.1 (3.23)	228.2 (8.98)	1,248.7 (49.16)
Average rainy days	20.0	18.0	15.3	6.8	1.7	0.8	0.4	0.7	0.8	4.0	8.7	15.7	92.9
Average afternoon relative humidity (%)	67	69	64	49	33	29	29	30	39	45	51	60	47
