= Halls Creek (disambiguation) =

Halls Creek may refer to:

- Halls Creek, Western Australia, a town in Australia
- Shire of Halls Creek, Western Australia
- Halls Creek (Ohio), a stream in Ohio
- Halls Creek (Utah), a stream in Utah
