= Islands of Lake Argyle =

Islands in Western Australia

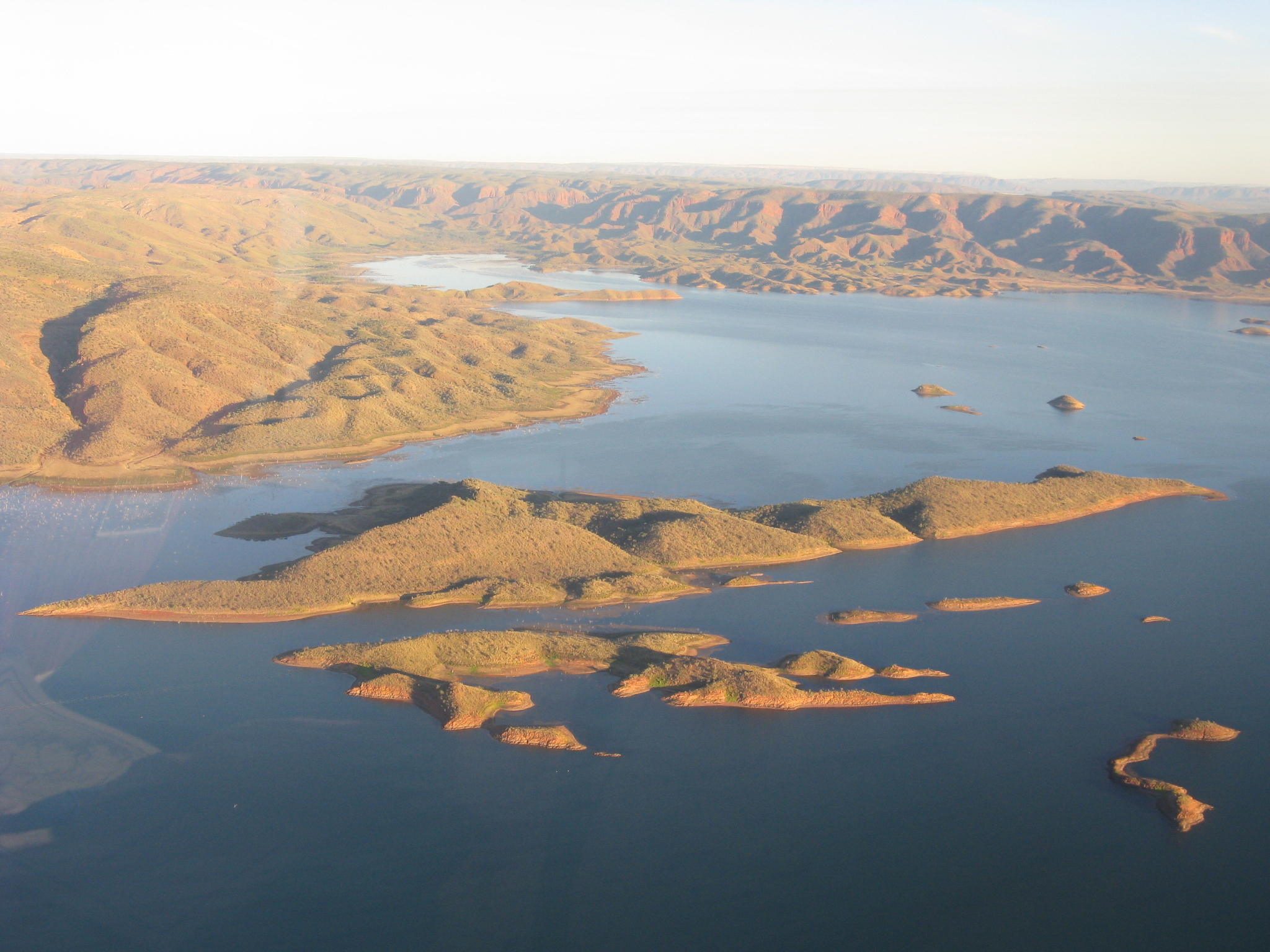
Aerial view of Lake Argyle islands

The Lake Argyle Islands are a large group of islands in Lake Argyle, created by the Ord River Dam on the Ord River in the Kimberley region of Western Australia. There are nearly 70 islands with official names, including most of the larger islands, as well as some small rocky outcrops.

== Formation ==
The islands are former elevated points and ranges found on what used to be a section of Argyle Downs Station, prior to the damming of the Ord River in 1971. As the lake filled, the lower grasslands became submerged while higher places along ranges became islands.

Some islands have sandy beaches and a range of flora and fauna, while others are swampy, or rocky and barren.

The lake level varies seasonly, meaning that some islands can grow and shrink, and smaller, lower islands and rocks can disappear and reappear. However, most of the islands are permanent, because the water level is unlikely to significantly change.

== List ==
=== Chinyin Group ===
- Chinyin Island and two other smaller islands, all located close to the dam wall. Small, slightly hilly islands in a barren, arid landscape.

=== Yambaraba Group ===
- Yambaraba Island is the sole permanent member of the Yambaraba Group. The island is fairly barren, though has beaches and a small hill in the centre.

== See also ==
- Lake island
