= Acacia drepanocarpa =

Scientific classification
- Kingdom: Plantae
- Clade: Tracheophytes
- Clade: Angiosperms
- Clade: Eudicots
- Clade: Rosids
- Order: Fabales
- Family: Fabaceae
- Subfamily: Caesalpinioideae
- Clade: Mimosoid clade
- Genus: Acacia
- Species: A. drepanocarpa

Binomial name
- Acacia drepanocarpa F.Muell.
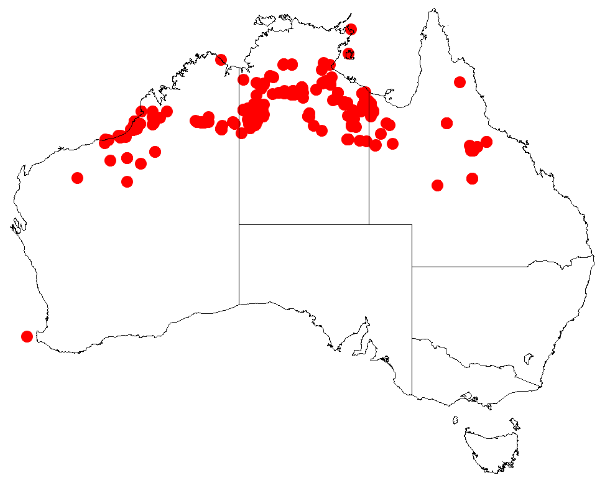
- Occurrence data from AVH

Synonyms
- Racosperma drepanocarpum (F.Muell.) Pedley

Species of legume

Acacia drepanocarpa is a species of flowering plant in the family Fabaceae and is endemic to the northern Australia. It is a sticky shrub with yellowish, ridged branchlets, linear to narrowly elliptic phyllodes, spikes of pale to bright yellow flowers and linear, leathery to thinly woody pods.

== Description ==
Acacia drepanocarpa is a sticky shrub that typically grows to a height of 0.9 to 4 metres (3 to 13 ft) and has yellowish, glabrous, ridged and often scurvy branchlets that are angular on the ends. Its phyllodes are linear to narrowly elliptic, 25–130 mm (0.98–5.12 in) long and 1.5 to 12.5 mm (0.059 to 0.492 in) wide with three to five prominent, raised veins. There is a gland usually up to 10 mm (0.39 in) above the base of the phyllode. The flowers are pale to bright yellow and borne in spikes 14–45 mm (0.55–1.77 in) long. Flowering time depends on subspecies, and the pods are linear, thick, glabrous, leathery to thinly woody, encrusted in resin, 50–90 mm (2.0–3.5 in) long and mostly 5.5–9 mm (0.22–0.35 in) wide. The seeds are narrowly oblong, 5–8 mm (0.20–0.31 in) long and dark brown with a narrowly cone-shaped aril.

== Taxonomy ==
Acacia drepanocarpa was first formally described in 1859 by Ferdinand von Mueller in the Journal of the Proceedings of the Linnean Society, Botany from specimens collected near the Gulf of Carpentaria.

Acacia drepanocarpa belongs to the A. stigmatophylla group.

In 1974, Leslie Pedley described two subspecies of A. drepanocarpa in Contributions from the Queensland Herbarium, and the names are accepted by the Australian Plant Census:

- Acacia drepanocarpa F.Muell. subsp. drepanocarpa has phyllodes mostly 50–131 mm (2.0–5.2 in) long and 1.5–3.5 mm (0.059–0.138 in) wide and flowers from May to August.
- Acacia drepanocarpa subsp. latifolia Leslie Pedley has phyllodes mostly 40–100 mm (1.6–3.9 in) long and 3.6–12.2 mm (0.14–0.48 in) wide and flowers from March to August.

The specific epithet (drepanocarpa) means 'sickle-fruited', presumably because the pods were originally described by Ferdinand von Mueller as 'subfalcate' (that is, slightly curved). However, this would seem to be an inappropriate name for this species as the pods are more typically straight (except following seed drop, where the pod valves are turned backwards).

== Distribution and habitat ==
- Acacia drepanocarpa subsp. drepanocarpa occurs in tropical Australia between Broome and Port Hedland in Western Australia, in the Barkly region of the Northern Territory and in northern Queensland, where it grows on sandplains and grassland in sand and laterite.
- Acacia drepanocarpa subsp. latifolia occurs between 18°S and 20°51′S in Western Australia, between 14°40′S and 19°S and 129°E and 134°E in the Northern Territory but also north to Katherine and south to Soudan station, extending into the northern parts of the Great Sandy and Tanami Deserts. In Queensland it is only recorded about 50 km (31 mi) east of the Northern Territory border. It grows in sandy soil, on laterite or sandstone, on gravelly plains in woodland, low scrub or shrub-grassland, often with Triodia species.

== Conservation status ==
Both subspecies of A. drepanocarpa are listed as "not threatened" by the Government of Western Australia Department of Biodiversity, Conservation and Attractions and as of "least concern" under the Northern Territory Government Territory Parks and Wildlife Conservation Act.

== See also ==
- List of Acacia species
