= List of State Register of Heritage Places in the Shire of Halls Creek =

List of heritage sites in Western Australia

The State Register of Heritage Places is maintained by the Heritage Council of Western Australia. As of 2026, 27 places are heritage-listed in the Shire of Halls Creek, of which five are on the State Register of Heritage Places.

== List ==
The Western Australian State Register of Heritage Places, as of 2026, lists the following five state registered places within the Shire of Halls Creek:

Place name	Place #	Street number	Street name	Suburb or town	Co-ordinates	Notes & former names	Photo
Old Halls Creek Post Office Ruins	1173		Connor Street, Old Halls Creek Townsite	Halls Creek	18.248639°S 127.783153°E		
Ord River Station Homestead (former) & Cemetery	1174		On Forest Creek near the Ord River	Ord River	17.399121°S 128.866732°E		
Halls Creek Trackers' Hut	3241		Corner Roberta Avenue & Great Northern Highway	Halls Creek	18.2245°S 127.665746°E		
Ord River Cemetery	3356	Lot 350	Duncan Road	Ord River	17.399462°S 128.869923°E		
Ord River Station Homestead (former)	24393	Lot 350	Duncan Road	Ord River	17.399121°S 128.866732°E		
