= Ord Irrigation Area Important Bird Area =

Important Bird Area in Western Australia

Coordinates: 15°41′43″S 128°44′01″E

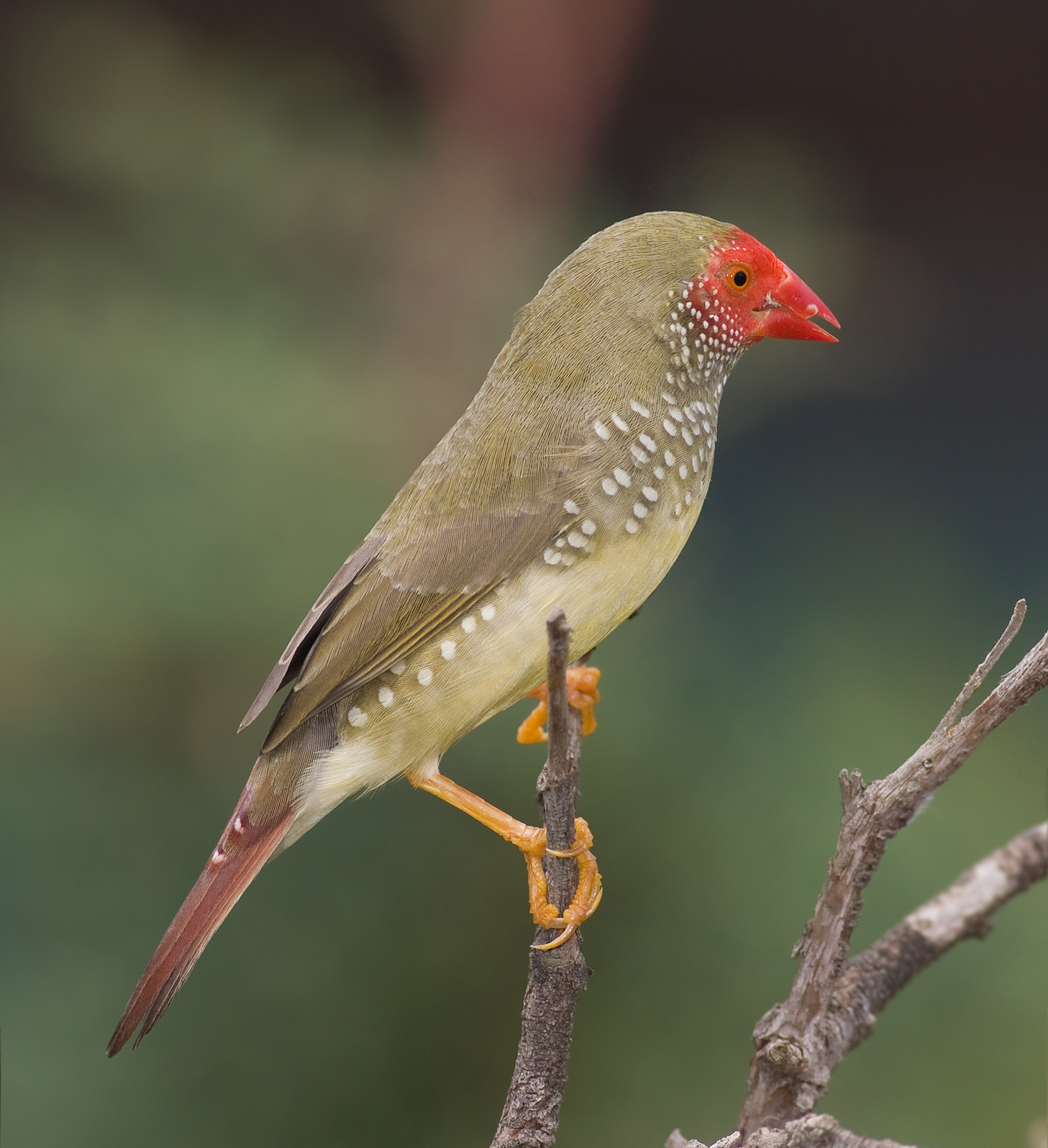
The IBA is an important area for star finches

The Ord Irrigation Area Important Bird Area is an area of land used for irrigated agriculture along the Ord River in the vicinity of the town of Kununurra in the Kimberley region of north-western Australia. It has been identified by BirdLife International as a 220 km^{2} Important Bird Area (IBA) for its significance for birds, especially estrildid finches.

== Description ==
The IBA comprises the entire irrigated area of the Ord River Irrigation Scheme around and downstream of Kununurra, with the adjacent Lake Kununurra extending upstream from the town. The establishment of irrigated farmland has formed perennially moist areas of cumbungi and native wetland grasses, which support larger numbers of several bird species than does the surrounding non-irrigated bushland and dry pasture. The cumbungi and grasses occur along waterways and the edges of Lake Kununurra, as well as in agricultural fallows. The average annual rainfall is 790 mm, falling mainly from October to April.

=== History ===
The irrigation and drainage infrastructure was constructed in the early 1960s, with commercial farming taking place from 1963 when Kununurra's Ord Diversion Dam was completed. Using water first from Lake Kununurra, and later from Lake Argyle, a reservoir formed by the completion of the main Ord Dam in 1972, some 140 km^{2} of cattle grazing land became productive farmland. Farm blocks are typically 260-360 ha in size, on heavy, black cracking clay soils. The main crops include sugarcane, sandalwood, fruit, vegetables and cotton.

== Birds ==
The IBA supports the largest recorded numbers of star finches and yellow-rumped munias, as well as smaller number of Australian bustards, Bush stone-curlews, white-gaped and yellow-tinted honeyeaters, white-browed robins, masked and long-tailed finches, and sometimes over 1% of the population of Australian pratincoles. Other birds found in the IBA include brolgas, little curlews and black-backed bitterns. Letter-winged kites, white-quilled rock-pigeons, varied lorikeets, northern rosellas, bar-breasted and banded honeyeaters are occasionally recorded.
