= Uradolichos longipennis =

Scientific classification
- Kingdom: Animalia
- Phylum: Arthropoda
- Clade: Pancrustacea
- Class: Insecta
- Order: Hemiptera
- Suborder: Auchenorrhyncha
- Family: Cicadidae
- Genus: Uradolichos
- Species: U. longipennis

Binomial name
- Uradolichos longipennis (Ashton, 1914)

Synonyms
- Urabunana longipennis Ashton, 1914

Species of cicada

Uradolichos longipennis is a species of cicada, also known as the candy tiger-squawker, in the true cicada family, Cicadettinae subfamily and Cicadettini tribe. The species is endemic to Australia. It was described in 1914 by Australian entomologist Julian Howard Ashton.

== Description ==
The length of the forewing is 14–17 mm.

== Distribution and habitat ==
The species occurs from near Billiluna in Western Australia eastwards to the Barkly Tableland in the Northern Territory. The associated habitat is low, open woodland.

== Behaviour ==
Adult males may be heard from September to January, clinging to the stems and branches of small eucalypts, emitting brief chirping calls.
