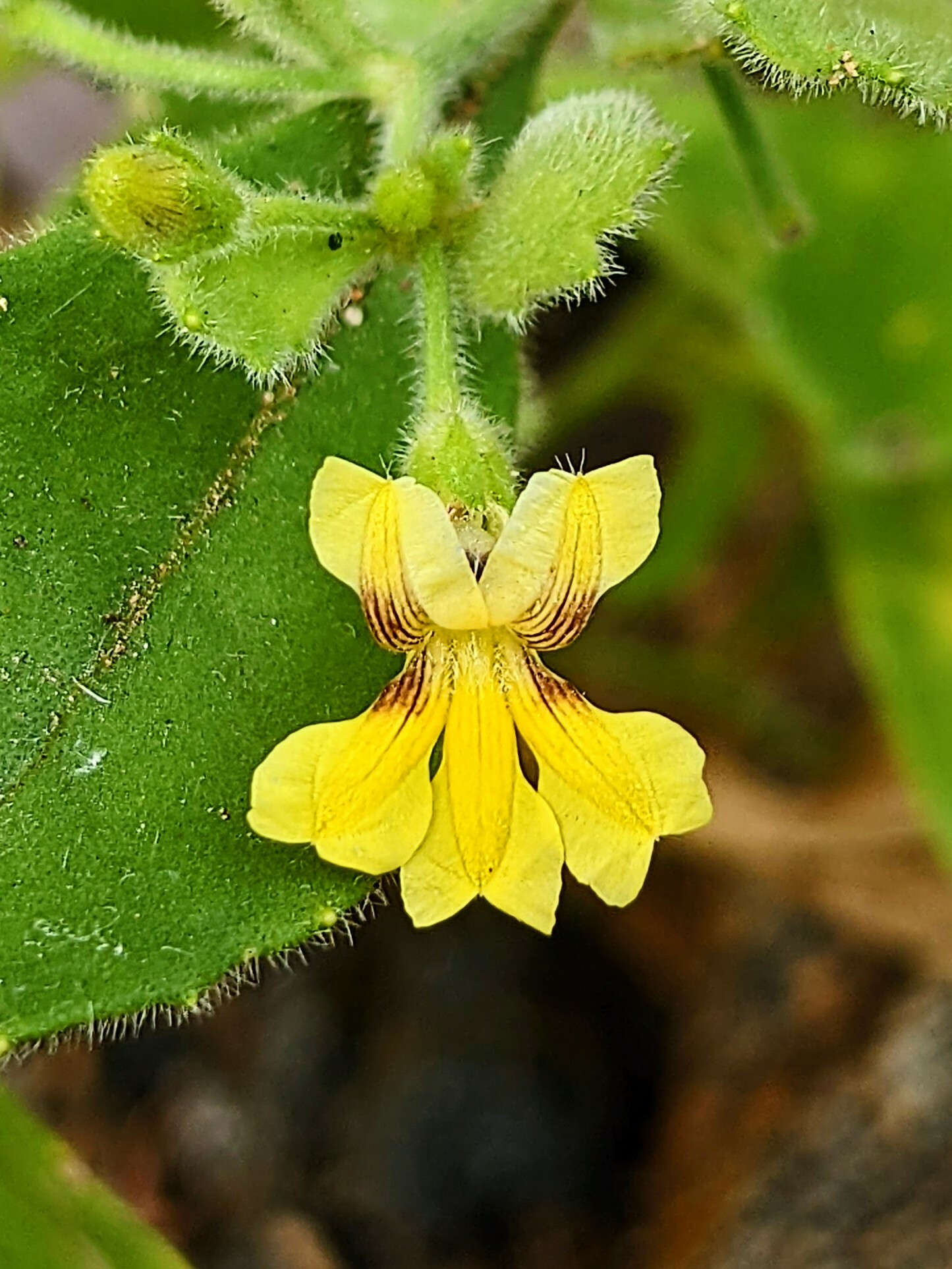

Scientific classification
- Kingdom: Plantae
- Clade: Tracheophytes
- Clade: Angiosperms
- Clade: Eudicots
- Clade: Asterids
- Order: Asterales
- Family: Goodeniaceae
- Genus: Goodenia
- Species: G. odonnellii

Binomial name
- Goodenia odonnellii F.Muell.

= Goodenia odonnellii =

Species of plant

Goodenia odonnellii is a species of flowering plant in the family Goodeniaceae and is endemic to northern Australia. It is an erect to low-lying herb with oblong to egg-shaped leaves with toothed or lyrate edges, and racemes of yellow flowers.

== Description ==
Goodenia odonnellii is an erect to low-lying herb with stems up to 40 cm (16 in) long. The leaves are oblong to egg-shaped, up to 60 mm (2.4 in) long and 18 mm (0.71 in) wide, with toothed or lyrate edges. The flowers are arranged in racemes up to 300 mm (12 in) long with leaf-like bracts, each flower on a pedicel 10–40 mm (0.39–1.57 in) long. The sepals are linear, 1–2 mm (0.039–0.079 in) long and the corolla is yellow, 5–7 mm (0.20–0.28 in) long. The lower lobes of the corolla are about 1.5 mm (0.059 in) long with wings 0.5–0.8 mm (0.020–0.031 in) wide. Flowering occurs from January to July and the fruit is a more or less spherical capsule, up to 3.8 mm (0.15 in) in diameter.

== Taxonomy and naming ==
Goodenia odonnellii was first formally described in 1886 by Ferdinand von Mueller in the Australasian Journal of Pharmacy from specimens collected "near the Ord River by H.T.O'Donell". The specific epithet (odonnellii) honours H.T. O'Donnell, an "explorer and gold digger".

== Distribution and habitat ==
This goodenia grows on river flats and around sandstone boulders in the north of Western Australia, the northern part of the Northern Territory and the Barkly Tableland in Queensland.

== Conservation status ==
Goodenia odonnellii is classified as "not threatened" by the Government of Western Australia Department of Parks and Wildlife and as of "least concern" under the Northern Territory Government Territory Parks and Wildlife Conservation Act 1976 and the Queensland Government Nature Conservation Act 1992.
