= Kundat Djaru Community =

Community in Western Australia

Kundat Djaru (Ringer Soak)
- Town
- Coordinates: 18°49′S 128°36′E
- Country: Australia
- State: Western Australia
- LGA(s): Shire of Halls Creek
- Location: 170 km (110 mi) south east of Halls Creek, Western Australia

Government
  - State electorate(s): Kimberley
  - Federal division(s): Durack

Area
  - Total: 35 km^{2} (14 sq mi)
- Elevation: 422 m (1,385 ft)

Population
  - Total(s): 141 (SAL 2021)
- Postcode: 6770
- Mean max temp: 33.6 °C (92.5 °F)
- Mean min temp: 20.0 °C (68.0 °F)
- Annual rainfall: 557.4 mm (21.94 in)

Kundat Djaru, also known as Ringer Soak, is a medium-sized Aboriginal community, located 170 km south east of Halls Creek in the Kimberley region of Western Australia, within the Shire of Halls Creek.

== History ==
The Kundat Djaru community consists of people displaced from the surrounding pastoral leases in 1967. These people were evicted from Gordon Downs Station between 1978 and 1981. The people then camped in Halls Creek and were given State Government assistance to move to Kundat Djaru which was made a permanent reserve in 1982. Population is nomadic but 160 people call Kundat Djaru home.

== Native title ==
The community is located within the determined Tjurabalan People (WAD160/97) native title claim area.

== Education ==
Children of school age at Kundat Djaru attend the Birlirr Ngawiyiwu (Spirit of God) Catholic School. The school is an integral part of life for the Kundat Djaru people with an enrolment of about 27 students from Pre-Kindy to Yr 6. A unique focus for the school is the two way learning of Jaru and English. Teachers and Aboriginal teacher assistants work collaboratively in providing a holistic education which encompasses the key learning areas of the curriculum whilst catering for the remoteness of the Yaruman situation and continuing the language, culture and traditions of the Jaru people. Children in older grades attend boarding school in various cities.

== Governance ==
The community is managed through its incorporated body, Kundat Djaru Aboriginal Corporation, incorporated under the Aboriginal Councils and Associations Act 1976 on 4 August 1980. The community boasts a store that also sells fuel and a small clinic that is staffed by one nurse and a doctor who visits half a day per fortnight. There is no community office at Kundat Djaru.

== Town planning ==
Kundat Djaru Layout Plan No.2 has been prepared in accordance with State Planning Policy 3.2 Aboriginal Settlements. Layout Plan No.2 was endorsed by the community on 15 March 2002 and the Western Australian Planning Commission on 28 October 2003. The Layout Plan map-set and background report can be viewed at Planning Western Australia's website.
