= Swainsona cyclocarpa =

Scientific classification
- Kingdom: Plantae
- Clade: Tracheophytes
- Clade: Angiosperms
- Clade: Eudicots
- Clade: Rosids
- Order: Fabales
- Family: Fabaceae
- Subfamily: Faboideae
- Genus: Swainsona
- Species: S. cyclocarpa

Binomial name
- Swainsona cyclocarpa F.Muell.

Synonyms
- Swainsona cyclocarpa F.Muell. var. cyclocarpa

Species of legume

Swainsona cyclocarpa is a species of flowering plant in the family Fabaceae and is endemic to northern inland areas of Australia. It is a prostrate or low-growing annual with imparipinnate leaves usually with up to 7 usually egg-shaped leaflets with the narrower end towards the base, and racemes of 4 to 16 purple flowers.

== Description ==
Swainsona cyclocarpa is a prostrate or low-growing, probably annual plant, that typically grows to a height of less than 15 cm (5.9 in) with strongly ribbed stems. Its leaves are imparipinnate, about 15 mm (0.59 in) long on an extended petiole with up to 7 usually egg-shaped leaflets 10–50 mm (0.39–1.97 in) long and 5–30 mm (0.20–1.18 in) wide. There are stipules 2–7 mm (0.079–0.276 in) long at the base of the petiole. The flowers are arranged in racemes 100–150 mm (3.9–5.9 in) or more long of 4 to 16 on a peduncle 0.5–1.5 mm (0.020–0.059 in) long, each flower 8–10 mm (0.31–0.39 in) long. The sepals are joined at the base, forming a tube about 2 mm (0.079 in) long, the sepal lobes shorter than the tube. The petals are purple, the standard petal 8–10 mm (0.31–0.39 in) long, the wings about 7 mm (0.28 in) long, and the keel 7.5–8.0 mm (0.30–0.31 in) long and 2.5–3 mm (0.098–0.118 in) wide. Flowering occurs in October, and the fruit is a flattened elliptic pod mostly 15–20 mm (0.59–0.79 in) long and about 5 mm (0.20 in) wide with the remains of a beak-like, tapered style about 3 mm (0.12 in) long.

== Taxonomy and naming ==
Swainsona cyclocarpa was first formally described in 1892 by Ferdinand von Mueller in The Victorian Naturalist, from specimens collected in the MacDonnell Ranges. The specific epithet (cyclocarpa) means "circular-fruited".

== Distribution and habitat ==
This species of pea grows on the margins of salt lakes in the Great Sandy Desert and Tanami Desert in the southern half of the Northern Territory and northern Western Australia.
