= Shire of Halls Creek =

Shire in the Kimberley region of Western Australia

Coordinates: 18°13′37″S 127°40′05″E

- Local government area
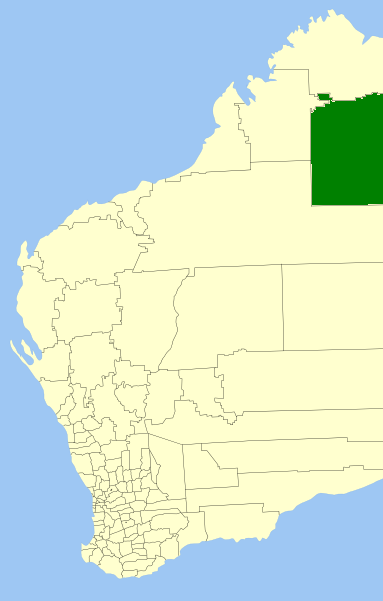
- Location in Western Australia

- Interactive map of Shire of Halls Creek
- Country: Australia
- State: Western Australia
- Region: Kimberley
- Established: 1887
- Council seat: Halls Creek

Government
  - President: Malcolm Edwards
  - State electorate: Kimberley
  - Federal division: Durack

Area
  - Total: 143,030 km^{2} (55,220 sq mi)

Population
  - Total: 3,574 (LGA 2021)
- Website: Shire of Halls Creek
LGAs around Shire of Halls Creek
| Derby-West Kimberley | Wyndham-East Kimberley | Victoria Daly (NT) |
| Derby-West Kimberley | Shire of Halls Creek | Victoria Daly (NT) |
| East Pilbara | East Pilbara | Central Desert (NT) |

The Shire of Halls Creek is one of the four local government areas in the Kimberley region of northern Western Australia, covering an area of 143,030 square kilometres (55,224 sq mi), most of which is sparsely populated. The Shire's seat of government is the town of Halls Creek. Many Aboriginal communities are located within the shire.

The Purnululu National Park, home to part of the Bungle Bungle Range, and Gregory Lake are within the Shire, as is the Wolfe Creek Meteorite Crater National Park.

== History ==
The Shire of Halls Creek originated as the Kimberley Goldfields Road District on 10 February 1887. It was renamed the Halls Creek Road District on 8 January 1915. On 1 July 1961, it became a shire following the passage of the Local Government Act 1960, which reformed all remaining road districts into shires.

== Stations ==
The area is home to many large cattle stations including Bedford Downs Station, which was established some time prior to 1906 by the Buchanan and Gordon brothers. Other properties in the area include Alice Downs, Louisa Downs, Moola Bulla, Springvale and Ruby Plains Station.

== Elected council ==
Councillors are elected at-large to represent the whole shire.

Previously the council consisted of three wards. A review of wards and representation was carried out in late 2008 and, at its December 2008 meeting, the council resolved to recommend to the Local Government Advisory Board that the wards be abolished.

| Ward | Councillor | Position |
|---|---|---|
| Unsubdivided | Malcolm Edwards | President |
| Unsubdivided | Chris Loessl | Deputy president |
| Unsubdivided | Rosemary Stretch | |
| Unsubdivided | Virginia O'Neil | |
| Unsubdivided | Bonnie Edwards | |
| Unsubdivided | Trish McKay | |
| Unsubdivided | (Vacant) | |

== Towns and localities ==
The towns and localities of the Shire of Halls Creek with population and size figures based on the most recent Australian census:

| Locality | Population | Area | Map |
|---|---|---|---|
| Durack * | 169 (SAL 2021) | 29,213.7 km^{2} (11,279.5 sq mi) | |
| Halls Creek | 1,572 (SAL 2021) | 44 km^{2} (17 sq mi) | |
| Kundat Djaru Community | 141 (SAL 2021) | 35 km^{2} (14 sq mi) | |
| Kupartiya Community | 56 (SAL 2021) | 6.1 km^{2} (2.4 sq mi) | |
| Lake Argyle * | 205 (SAL 2021) | 9,247.2 km^{2} (3,570.4 sq mi) | |
| McBeath | 32 (SAL 2021) | 1.2 km^{2} (0.46 sq mi) | |
| Mueller Ranges * | 366 (SAL 2021) | 37,982.5 km^{2} (14,665.1 sq mi) | |
| Ord River | 158 (SAL 2021) | 23,311.1 km^{2} (9,000.5 sq mi) | |
| Purnululu National Park | 13 (SAL 2021) | 2,438.4 km^{2} (941.5 sq mi) | |
| Sturt Creek | 330 (SAL 2021) | 21,157.6 km^{2} (8,169.0 sq mi) | |
| Tanami | 487 (SAL 2021) | 57,896.7 km^{2} (22,354.0 sq mi) | |
| Warmun Community | 457 (SAL 2021) | 20.3 km^{2} (7.8 sq mi) | |

- (* indicates locality is only partially located within this shire)

== Indigenous communities ==
Indigenous communities in the Shire of Halls Creek:

- Balgo
- Billiluna (Mindibungu)
- Halls Creek
- Mulan
- Kundat Djaru (Ringer Soak)
- Warmun (Turkey Creek)
- Yiyili

== Heritage-listed places ==
As of 2023, 27 places are heritage-listed in the Shire of Halls Creek, of which five are on the State Register of Heritage Places.
