= Argyle Downs =

Pastoral lease in Western Australia

Coordinates: 16°30′7.80″S 128°55′2.67″E

Location in Western Australia

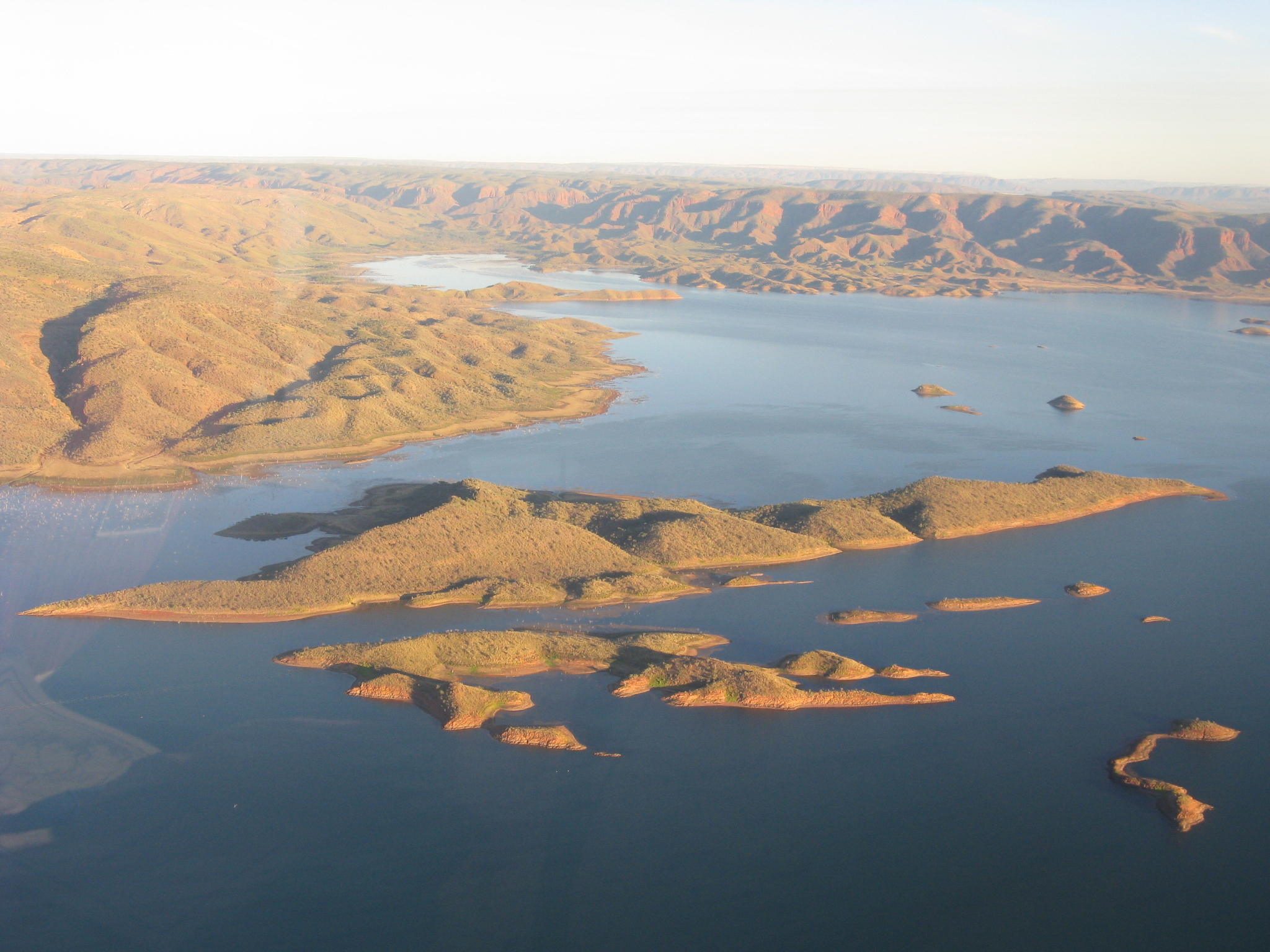
Lake Argyle

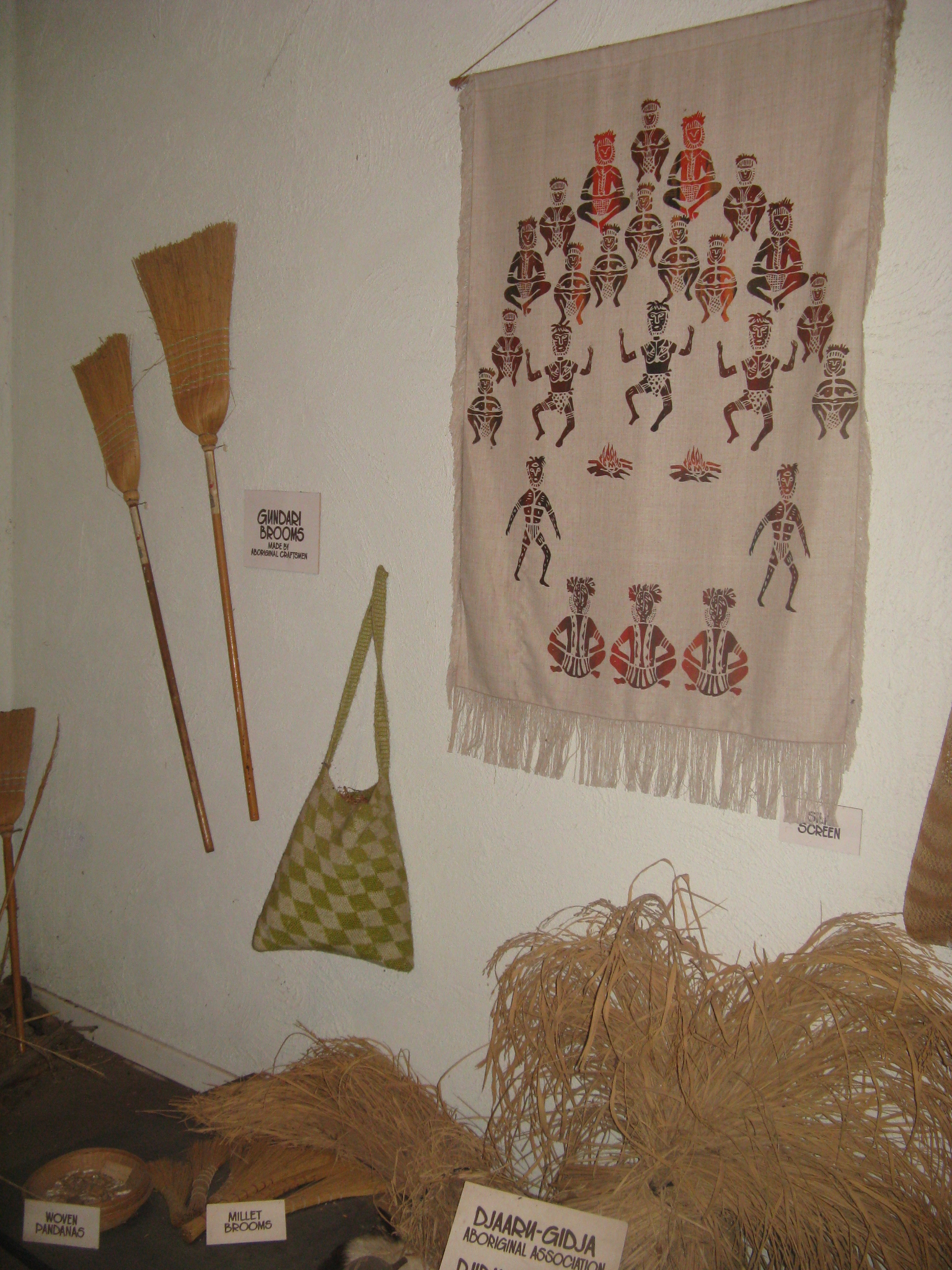
Durack Homestead, Aboriginal Room

Argyle Downs is a pastoral lease and cattle station located about 120 kilometres (75 mi) south east of Kununurra in the Kimberley region near the border of Western Australia and Northern Territory. It is operated by the Consolidated Pastoral Company.

== Description ==
The station occupies an area of 1,000 square kilometres (386 sq mi) and is a mix of black soil plains and red basalt country with the Ord River and Lake Argyle situated on the western boundary. Currently the property annually turns off 7,500 head of cattle for live export to the south East Asia market. Stock horses are also bred and raised on the property for use on other stations.

== History ==
The traditional owners of the area are the Malngin people.

The area was settled in 1882 by Patrick and his brother Michael Durack, who arrived in the area after trekking across the north of the continent from Thylungra Station, their property on Coopers Creek in Queensland, where they left from in 1879 along with 7250 breeding cattle and 200 horses. The 3000 mile journey of cattle to stock Argyle Downs and Ivanhoe Station is the longest of its type ever recorded.

The Duracks exported the cattle from the station through the port of Wyndham to markets as far as South Africa and North America.

The homestead was constructed in 1895 by the Durack family and was renowned as one of the main social gathering places in the east Kimberley. Built from limestone blocks and mortar made from crushed termite mounds, the homestead had to be dismantled to make way for Lake Argyle in the 1970s. The homestead was reopened in 1979 and now acts as a museum in its present location along the shore of the lake.

By 1901 the station along with Newry and Auvergne was carrying about 45,000 head of cattle.

2,606 cattle were taken from Argyle Downs and moved overland to Queensland in 1911. During the journey many of the drovers suffered from fever including Thomas Stafford who died as a result of his illness.

The governor-general, Lord Gowrie, was a guest of the Duracks at the station in 1939 during his farewell tour.

A medical emergency at the station in 1944 resulted in a mercy flight being sent from Perth. The RAAF plane crashed into the ocean killing all five members of the flight.

In 1951 over 700 bullocks from the station were sold and transported to Wyndham for slaughter at the meatworks.

A sizeable proportion of the lease was resumed by the government in the 1950s for the Ord River Irrigation Scheme.

Argyle Downs Airport is situated within the lease.

== See also ==
- List of ranches and stations
- List of pastoral leases in Western Australia
