= Uradolichos rotunda =

Scientific classification
- Kingdom: Animalia
- Phylum: Arthropoda
- Clade: Pancrustacea
- Class: Insecta
- Order: Hemiptera
- Suborder: Auchenorrhyncha
- Family: Cicadidae
- Genus: Uradolichos
- Species: U. rotunda

Binomial name
- Uradolichos rotunda Owen & Moulds, 2016

Species of cicada

Uradolichos rotunda is a species of cicada, also known as the dark tiger-squawker, in the true cicada family, Cicadettinae subfamily and Cicadettini tribe. The species is endemic to Australia. It was described in 2016 by entomologists Christopher Owen and Maxwell Sydney Moulds.

== Etymology ==
The specific epithet rotunda comes from Latin rotundus (round), referring to the bulbous abdomen.

== Description ==
The length of the forewing is 15–20 mm.

== Distribution and habitat ==
The species occurs in Western Australia from Exmouth eastwards to the Hamersley Range and southwards to Yalgoo. The associated habitat is low, open woodland.

== Behaviour ==
Adult males may be heard from September to March after rainfall, clinging to the stems and branches of small eucalypts, emitting brief chirping calls in sunny conditions.
