= Argyle Downs Airport =

- IATA: none; ICAO: none

Summary
- Location: Argyle Downs, Western Australia, Australia
- Elevation AMSL: 289 ft / 88 m
- Coordinates: 16°39′S 128°45′E

Map
- Location in Western Australia

Runways
Direction	Length		Surface
Direction	m	ft	Surface
		5,620

Argyle Downs Airport is an airport in Argyle Downs, Western Australia.

== See also ==
- List of airports in Western Australia
- Transport in Australia § Aviation
