= Lake Kununurra =

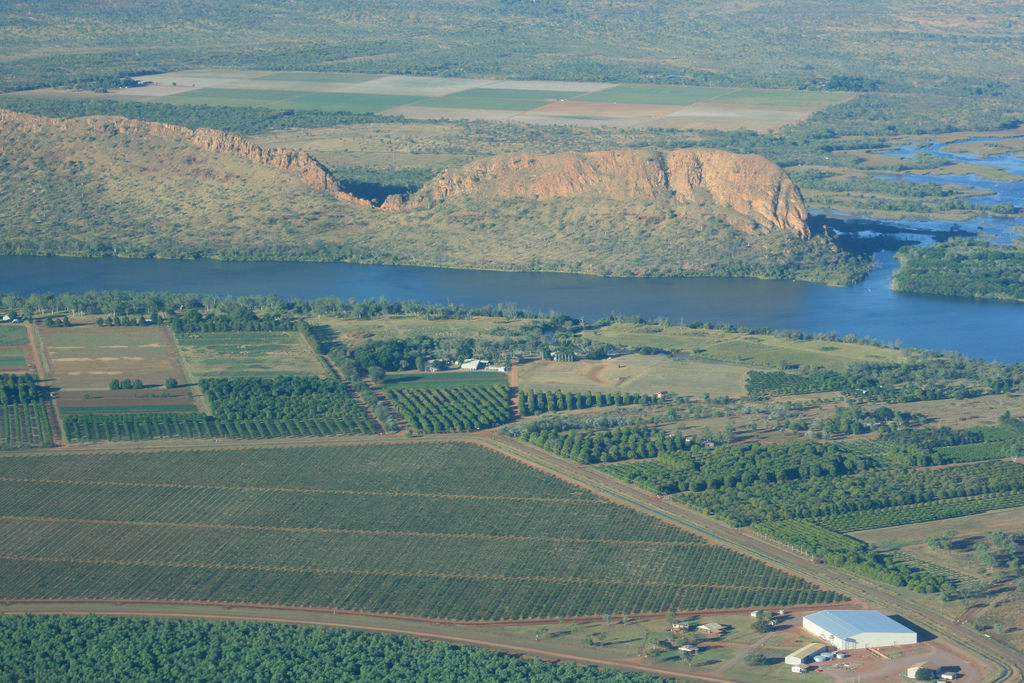

- Location in Western Australia
- Location: Kununurra, Western Australia
- Coordinates: 15°48′31.8″S 128°44′22.6″E
- Type: Freshwater reservoir
- Primary inflows: Lake Argyle
- Primary outflows: Ord River
- Basin countries: Australia
- Designation: Lakes Argyle and Kununurra Ramsar Site; Ord Irrigation Area Important Bird Area
- Built: 1959
- First flooded: 1963
- Max. length: 55 km (34 mi)
- Max. width: 0.4 km (0.25 mi)
- Water volume: 90 GL (3.2×10^{9} cu ft)
- Surface elevation: 40 m (130 ft)

Ramsar Wetland
- Official name: Lakes Argyle and Kununurra
- Designated: 7 June 1990
- Reference no.: 478

Lake Kununurra is a freshwater man-made reservoir in the Ord River valley. The lake was formed in 1963 by the construction of the Ord Diversion Dam in Kununurra, northern Western Australia, which was built to supply water to the Ord River Irrigation Area. Prior to the diversion dam construction a natural permanent waterhole (or lake) held back by the Bandicoot Bar was known as "Carlton Reach", which was reputed to be the largest waterhole in the Kimberley.

== Description ==
The lake stretches for 55 km (34 mi) upstream from the Diversion Dam at 15°47′30″S 128°41′45″E towards the larger Lake Argyle dam at 16°07′15″S 128°44′17″E. At the town of Kununurra the lake is connected to Lily Creek Lagoon. It contains freshwater crocodiles and 21 fish species, and is widely used for recreational fishing and boating by the residents of Kununurra and tourists. Because of the stable water levels in Lake Kununurra and its associated wetlands, it has well-developed fringing vegetation of grassland, rushes and woodland. The wetland system of the two lakes and the lagoon forms the Lakes Argyle and Kununurra Ramsar Site. In 2014 a saltwater crocodile estimated to be 3 metres (10 ft) long was spotted in the lake after bypassing dam walls. Local rangers lay baits in hopes of catching the creature.

== Birds ==
The lake forms part of the Ord Irrigation Area Important Bird Area (IBA), so identified by BirdLife International because of its importance for wild birds, especially estrildid finches.

== Engineering heritage award ==
The diversion dam was declared a Historic Landmark of Agricultural Engineering and awarded an Engineering Heritage Marker by Engineers Australia as part of its Engineering Heritage Recognition Program.

== See also ==
- List of reservoirs and dams in Western Australia
- Water security in Australia
