= Nicholson River (Western Australia) =

River in Western Australia

Coordinates: 17°43′10″S 128°33′56″E

Location
- Country: Australia

Physical characteristics
- Source
  - elevation: 388 metres (1,273 ft)
- Mouth
  - location: Ord River
  - elevation: 160 metres (525 ft)
- Length: 139 km (86 mi)

The Nicholson River is a river in the Kimberley region of Western Australia. It takes its name from the Nicholson Plains, named in 1879 by Alexander Forrest after Sir Charles Nicholson, the central figure in the circle of Australian "colonists" in London, and a promoter of the Forrest brothers' explorations. In 1870, Nicholson had presented a paper, entitled On Forrest's Expedition into the Interior of Western Australia, Goyder's Survey of the Neighbourhood of Port Darwin, and on the Recent Progress of Australian Discovery, to a meeting of the Royal Geographical Society of London.

The river rises just north of Koolerong Bore and flows south-west through Nicholson and through Marella Gorge, before turning north and discharging into the Ord River on the eastern edge of Purnululu National Park near Doughboy Hill.

There are eleven tributaries of the Nicholson: 2 Mile Creek, 5 Mile Creek, Bamboo Creek, Bull Creek, Calico Creek, Candy Creek, Clean Skin Creek, Flatstone Creek, Red Bank Creek, Tyson Creek and Wire Creek.
