= Coyote Gold Mine =

Gold mine in Western Australia

Coyote
- Location in Western Australia
- Interactive map of Coyote
- Location: Tanami Desert, Western Australia, Australia; 19°53′48″S 128°49′50″E
- Products: Gold
- Production: 0
- Financial year: 2021
- Opened: 2006
- Closed: 2013
- Company: Black Cat Syndicate
- Website: www.blackcatsyndicate.com.au
- Acquired: 2022

The Coyote Gold Mine is a gold mine located in the remote Tanami Desert in the Kimberley region of Western Australia. The mine, processing plant and camp are 17 km west of the Northern Territory border. The mine was closed in 2013 and placed in care and maintenance.

Coyote is located on the land of the Tjurabalan people, the traditional owners of the area. Tanami and the Tjurabalan people signed a native title agreement in 2005 to have a mining lease granted. This also included a commitment to employ a number of Tjurabalan people.

== History ==
Serious exploration for resources, especially gold, was carried out in the region from early 2000 by a number of companies, specifically AngloGold, Newmont, Tanami Gold and Otter Gold Mines. Some of the area of the Coyote mine was part of an exploration lease owned by AngloGold.

Tanami Gold acquired the tenement in November 2003 from AngloGold for A$14 million in cash and shares. AngloGold, in turn, had acquired it when it took over Acacia Resources in January 2000.

The mine was opened on 24 May 2006 by the Governor-General of Australia, Michael Jeffery, after a 12-year planning phase. It initially had a production target of 60,000 ounces per year.

In October 2006, Tanami had to temporarily suspend mining to cut costs as its treatment facility experienced difficulties in the commissioning. In late 2006, Tanami was in talks with Monarch Gold Mining in regards to a merger, but talks were later called off amid concerns that the treatment plant at Coyote would need further investment.

In January 2007, the Coyote Pit 2 was flooded in a major rain event. Mining was resumed in Pit 1 in April 2007.

With the financial crisis in 2008, Tanami had to borrow $7.7 million to continue its mining operation at Coyote.

In 2008–09, ore was mined in the Coyote Open Pit 1 and 2 as well as the Gonzales lode underground operation. Once the Coyote pit will be exhausted, which is scheduled for September 2009, two other open pits will be mined, the Kookaburra and Sandpiper pits.

On 23 April 2013, The West Australian reported the Coyote project was one of the State's highest-cost producers, pouring gold at basic costs of $1220/oz. The mine went into care and maintenance shortly after that retrenching 150 employees.

Tanami Gold placed the Coyote mine into care and maintenance in late April 2013, citing falling gold prices, rising cost and equipment failures as the reason.

In October 2017, Northern Star Resources purchased the mine for A$4 million from Tanami Gold. Tanami Gold had previously offered the mine to ABM Resources, who had an option to buy it between 2014 and 2016 but ultimately declined.

Under Northern Star, the Coyote Gold Mine is part of the larger Tanami Project, which spans mining leases in both Western Australia and the Northern Territory.

In June 2022 the mine was sold to Black Cat Syndicate as part of a package of assets which also included the Paulsens Gold Mine. Exploration was recommenced and the facility is expected to be restored and returned to operation.

== Production ==
Production of the mine:

Quarter	Production	Grade	Cost per ounce
March 2007	2,981 ounces		
June 2007	1,718 ounces		
Total 2006–07			
September 2007	6,051 ounces	3.27 g/t	
December 2007	11,779 ounces		A$ 709
March 2008	6,122 ounces	3.38 g/t	A$1,029
June 2008	5,799 ounces	3.37 g/t	
Total 2007–08	29,751 ounces		
September 2008	4,261 ounces	5.8 g/t	
December 2008	3,952 ounces	2.9 g/t	
March 2009	5,971 ounces	6.1 g/t	
June 2009	9,136 ounces	6.0 g/t	
Total 2008–09	23,320 ounces	5.1 g/t	
September 2009	12,821 ounces	5.5 g/t	A$660
December 2009	11,783 ounces	7.6 g/t	
March 2010	10,456 ounces	6.7 g/t	A$672
June 2010	12,900 ounces	7.5 g/t	A$655
Total 2009–10	47,960 ounces		
2010–11			
2011–12			
2012–13	30,216 ounces	5.03 g/t	
2013–present	inactive		
