= Uradolichos =

Scientific classification
- Kingdom: Animalia
- Phylum: Arthropoda
- Clade: Pancrustacea
- Class: Insecta
- Order: Hemiptera
- Suborder: Auchenorrhyncha
- Infraorder: Cicadomorpha
- Superfamily: Cicadoidea
- Family: Cicadidae
- Subfamily: Cicadettinae
- Genus: Uradolichos; Moulds, 2012

Genus of cicadas

Uradolichos is a genus of cicadas, also known as tiger-sqawkers, in the family Cicadidae, subfamily Cicadettinae and tribe Cicadettini. It is endemic to Australia. It was described in 2012 by Australian entomologist Maxwell Sydney Moulds.

== Etymology ==
The genus name Uradolichos is derived from Greek dolichos (‘long’), with reference to the elongated body, especially of the males.

== Species ==
As of 2025 there were two described species in the genus:

- Uradolichos longipennis (Ashton, 1914) (Candy Tiger-squawker)
- Uradolichos rotunda Owen and Moulds, 2016 (Dark Tiger-squawker)
