= Negri River =

River in Western Australia, and Northern Territory, Australia

- Location within Australia

Location
- Country: Australia
- Region: Western Australia

Physical characteristics
- Source
  - location: Northern Territory
  - coordinates: 17°04′S 128°54′E
- Mouth
  - location: Confluence with the Ord River
- Length: approx. 100 km (62 mi)

The Negri River is a river in Australia. It flows from the Northern Territory into Western Australia, where it merges with the Ord River to become part of the Ord River catchment. It is roughly 100 kilometres long.

It was named by Alexander Forrest on 2 August 1879, the same day he named the Ord River. The following is from his journal.

We started on again today, and steering N. E. and E.N.E. for about six miles, we came to a large river, very similar in character to the one we have been following down during the last week. I have named this river the Negri, after Commander Christopher Negri of Turin. In all probability it joins the one we have just left; so, after crossing it, we turned Northwards, hoping again to come upon the larger stream.

== Environment ==
Many parts of the river's catchment suffered erosion and become degraded due to overgrazing in the first half of the 20th century. The increased sediment load posed a long-term threat to the Ord River Dam that required a regeneration project, which began in 1960.

== See also ==
- List of rivers of Australia § Northern Territory
- List of watercourses in Western Australia
