= Bow River (Kimberley region, Western Australia) =

River in Kimberley region of Western Australia,

Coordinates: 16°39′00″S 128°39′50″E

Location
- Country: Australia

Physical characteristics
- Source
  - location: Kimberley region
  - elevation: 509 metres (1,670 ft)
- Mouth
  - location: Confluence with the Ord River at Lake Argyle
- Length: 148 kilometres (92 mi)

The Bow River is a 148-kilometre (92 mi) long tributary of the Ord River in the Kimberley region of northern Western Australia. The river was named by pastoralist Michael Durack in 1882 after the Bow River in his family's ancestral home of County Clare, Ireland.

The river flows into the Ord River at Lake Argyle.

There are 12 tributaries of the Bow River including Wilson River, Turkey Creek, Limestone Creek and Spring Creek.

Bow River is the subject of the famous song of the same name by the iconic Australian pub rock band Cold Chisel. The song was later covered by its composer, Cold Chisel member Ian Moss.
