= Dunham River =

River in Western Australia

Coordinates: 16°17′8″S 128°9′16″E

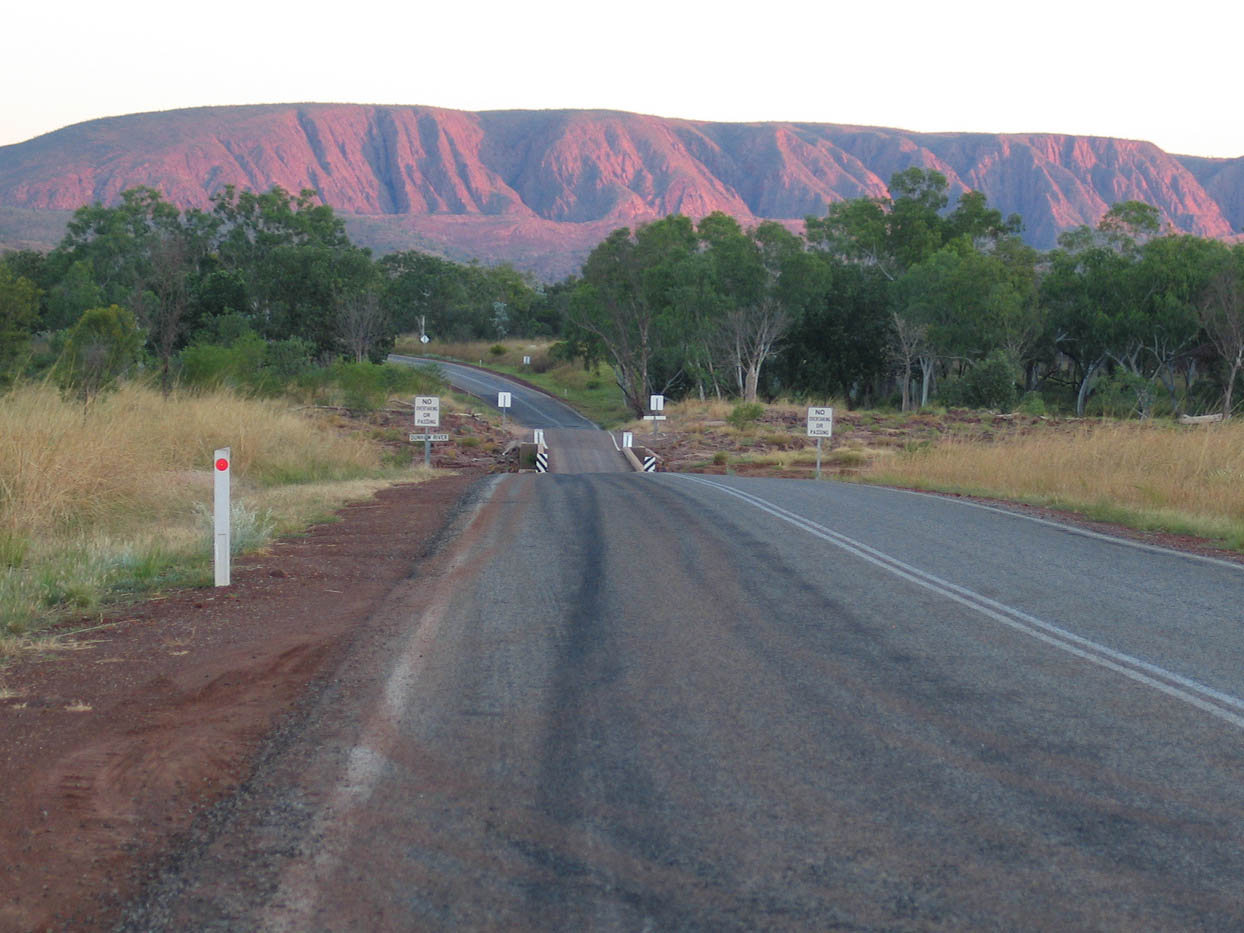
- Old Dunham River bridge, replaced by new bridge 3 km downstream in 2009

Location
- Country: Australia

Physical characteristics
- Source
  - elevation: 180 metres (591 ft)
- Mouth
  - location: Ord River
  - elevation: 31 metres (102 ft)
- Length: 153 kilometres (95 mi)
- Basin size: 1,631 square kilometres (630 sq mi)
- Discharge
  - average: 261,200 ML/a (8.28 m^{3}/s; 292.3 cu ft/s)

The Dunham River is a river in the Kimberley region of Western Australia.

The river rises between the Durack Range and the O'Donnell Range then flows north-west parallel with the Great Northern Highway to the east and the Bedford Stock Route to the west. The river then crosses the Great Northern Highway near Cabbage Tree Creek and continues north-west crossing the Victoria Highway and discharging into the Ord River west of Kununurra.

There are five tributaries of the Dunham; Cabbage Tree Creek, Pelican Creek, Macphee Creek, Rabbit Creek and Pumpkin Lookout Creek.

The river flows through one permanent waterhole, Flying Fox waterhole, toward the end of its journey.

The river is prone to flooding during rain events. In March 2000, the peak flow of the river was estimated at 2700 m^{3} s^{−1} during floods.

The river was named on 14 September 1882 after clergyman Father Francis Augustine Dunham of Brisbane, by explorer and Kimberley pioneer Michael Durack, part of an expedition to locate and acquire new pastoral lands with Sydney Phillip Emmanuel, Thomas Kilfoyle, geologist and surveyor John Pentecost, James Josey and Thomas Horan.
