= Lakes Argyle and Kununurra Ramsar Site =

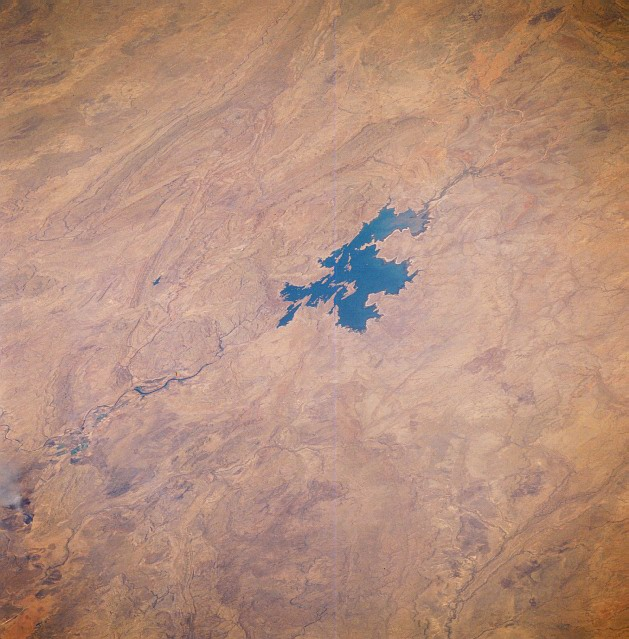
- View of Lake Argyle from space, looking south-east, with the Ord River valley and Lake Kununurra at lower left

- Location within Western Australia
- Location: Western Australia
- Coordinates: 16°19′S 128°44′E
- Area: 1,500 km^{2} (580 sq mi)
- Established: 7 June 1990

Ramsar Wetland
- Official name: Lakes Argyle and Kununurra
- Designated: 7 June 1990
- Reference no.: 478

The Lakes Argyle and Kununurra Ramsar Site comprises an extensive system of artificial freshwater reservoirs, with their associated permanent wetlands, formed by damming the Ord River in the eastern part of the Kimberley region of northern Western Australia. The reservoirs include Lake Argyle and Lake Kununurra. There are numerous endemic plants and a rich fauna. The 1,500 km^{2} (580 sq mi) site was designated a wetland of international importance under the Ramsar Convention on 7 June 1990, making it Ramsar Site 478.

== Description ==
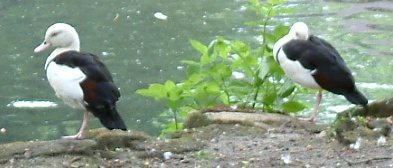
Radjah shelduck

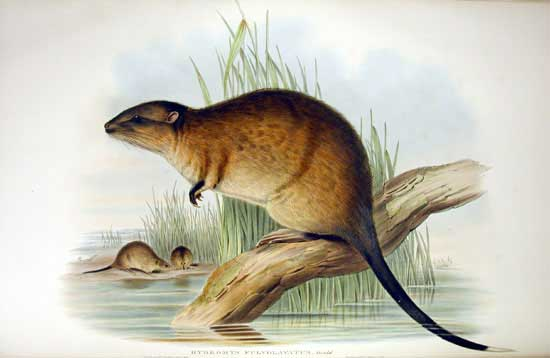
Rakali, or water-rat

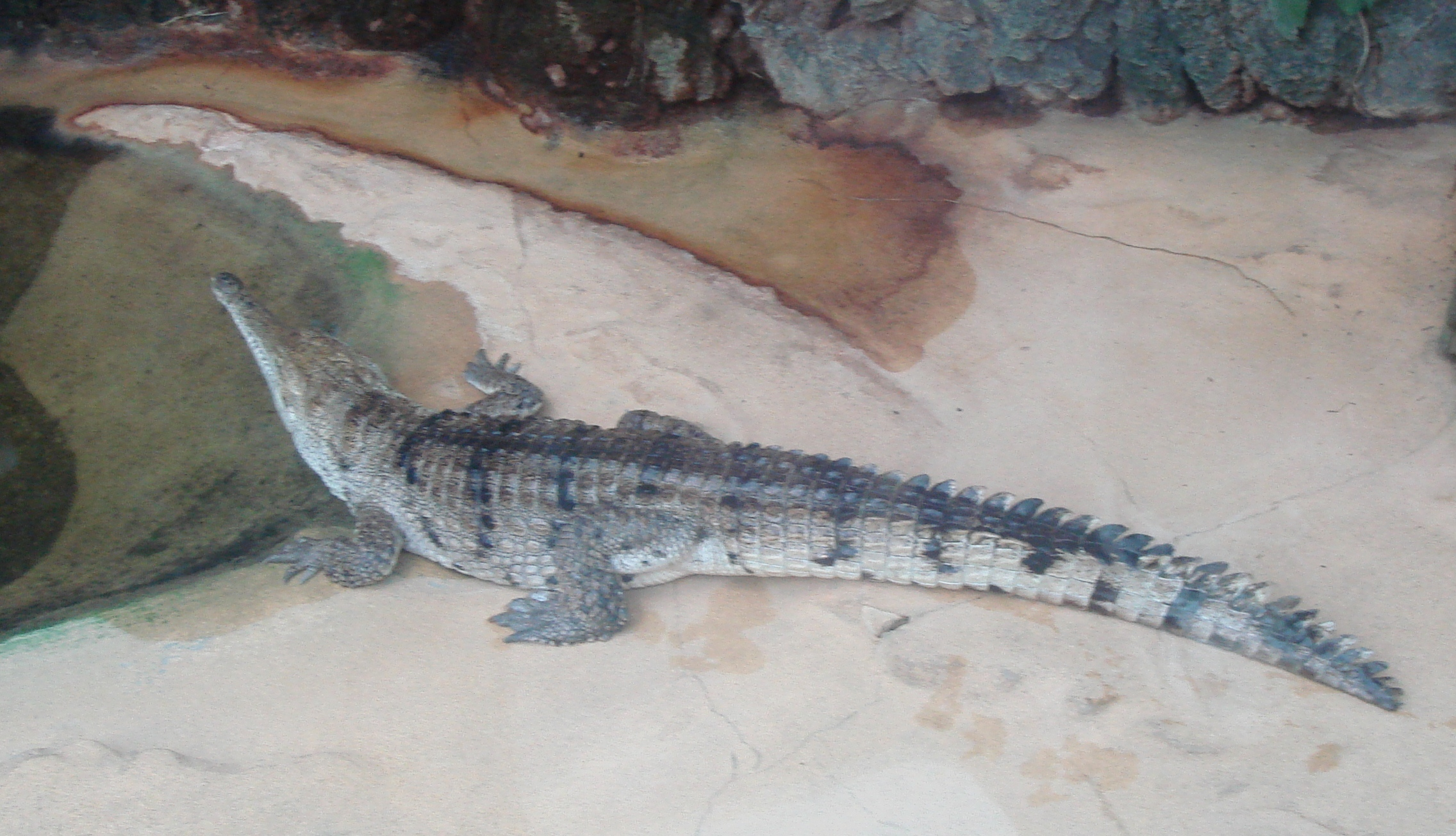
Freshwater crocodile

The diversion dam on the Ord River was completed in 1963 as the first stage of the Ord River Irrigation Scheme. It flooded the Ord valley upstream towards the site of the Argyle Dam, creating Lake Kununurra and subsidiary wetlands such as Lily Creek Lagoon and the Packsaddle Swamps. The Argyle Dam was completed in 1972 as the second stage of the scheme, creating Lake Argyle. The town of Kununurra was built at the site of the diversion dam, adjoining Lake Kununurra and Lily Creek Lagoon. Human use of the area includes irrigated tropical agriculture, diamond mining and exploration, and with tourism becoming increasingly important.

=== Flora and fauna ===
Water levels in Lake Argyle fluctuate annually by about 3 metres (9.8 ft) but those in Lake Kununurra and its associated wetlands are kept constant except for short periods when levels are lowered to control weed growth. There are dead trees throughout the wetland system which were killed by permanent flooding following dam construction. The lakes are deep and there are large areas of open water without aquatic plants. The large fluctuation in water levels in Lake Argyle has prevented vegetation establishment along most of the shoreline. However, because water levels are stable in Lake Kununurra and its associated wetlands, they have developed densely vegetated margins, with aquatic plants fringed by bulrushes, grassland and savanna woodland. Tree species found on the wetland margins include broad-leaved paperbark, Eucalyptus microtheca, river red gum, Nauclea orientalis, Sesbania formosa and Lophostemon grandiflorus.

The lakes form an important dry season refuge for waterbirds, with regular numbers of over 20,000 and sometimes of up to 200,000 individuals. Lake Argyle contains some of the largest aggregations of waterbirds in northern Australia. Abundant species include glossy ibis (with up to 6,000 counted), magpie goose (10,500), wandering whistling duck (11,000), plumed whistling duck (4,300), radjah shelduck (900), Pacific black duck (16,000), grey teal (17,200), pink-eared duck (1,800), hardhead (51,400), green pygmy goose (1,500) and Eurasian coot (50,000). The two lakes are a stronghold of the comb-crested jacana. Over 200 terrestrial and aquatic bird species have been recorded in the area, which also supports several kinds of microbats, the little red and black flying-foxes, rakali, and large numbers of freshwater crocodiles.

== See also ==
- List of reservoirs and dams in Western Australia
