= Halls Creek (Utah) =

Stream in Garfield and Kane County, Utah, U.S.

Coordinates: 37.5333236°N 110.8457045°W

Halls Creek is a stream in Garfield and Kane counties, in Utah, United States.

Halls Creek was named for Charles Hall, a pioneer who settled at the creek in the 1880s.

== See also ==
- List of rivers of Utah
