= Tjurabalan =

Nomadic desert tribe in Western Australia

The Tjurabalan (Jura-palan) are an Aboriginal Australian people from the edge of the Tanami Desert near Sturt Creek and The Paraku Lake system, Lake Gregory in the Kimberley region of Western Australia.

== Language ==
The language jurisdictions governing much of Tjurabalan territory are provided by Djaru and Walmajarri.

== Country ==
The Tjurabalan dwell in the Tanami Desert, in proximity to the Ngurrara, and encompasses the communities of Ringer Soak (Kundat Djaru), Billiluna, Mulan and Balgo. The Coyote Gold Mine is also located within the native title of the Tjurabalan people.

== History ==
The explorers David Carnegie and Alfred Canning crossed their region, both being in the habit of capturing aboriginals and coercing them into revealing where fresh water springs might be found. Carnegie denied them water until their thirst made them collaborate. Canning had chains and neck padlocks manufactured which he applied to kidnapped Tjurabalan people in order to force them to guide his party to water.

Oral tradition of a massacre of the local Tjurabalan people by white settlers was corroborated by forensic archaeological investigations in 2017.

The Tjurabalan did not have much contact with whites until the 1950s since no extensive development projects had been envisaged for their area down to that time.

== Native title ==
In Ngalpil vs. Western Australia (2001) the Tjurabalan won recognition of their native title rights to 26,000 square kilometres (10,000 mi^{2}) of their traditional lands.

== Sources ==
- "AIATSIS map of Indigenous Australia". AIATSIS. 14 May 2024.
- Herbert, Bronwyn (5 June 2006). "Gold mine brings new opportunities to the Tanami Desert". ABC Rural.
- Mahood, Kim; Carty, John (2013). "A Lake in Time: Histories of Paruku". In Martin, Mandy; Carty, John; Morton, Steve; Mahood, Kim (eds.). Desert Lake: Art, Science and Stories from Paruku. CSIRO Publishing. pp. 57–70. ISBN 978-0-643-10839-4.
- Smith, Pam (31 October 2017). "Oral testimony of an Aboriginal massacre now supported by scientific evidence". The Conversation.
- "Tindale Tribal Boundaries" (PDF). Department of Aboriginal Affairs, Western Australia. September 2016.
- Tran, Tran (2016) [First published 2015]. "The (Non-Legal) Guide to Meaningful Recognition: A Case Study from the Canning Basin, Western Australia". In Sillitoe, Paul (ed.). Indigenous Studies and Engaged Anthropology: The Collaborative Moment. Routledge. pp. 163–179. ISBN 978-1-317-11722-3.
