= Ruby Plains Station =

Pastoral lease in Western Australia

Coordinates: 18.593611°S 127.641159°E

Location in Western Australia

Ruby Plains Station is a pastoral lease and cattle station located about 41 kilometres (25 mi) south of Halls Creek in the Kimberley region of Western Australia. It is situated along the Tanami Track and is used as a stopping place along the Canning Stock Route.

Ruby Plains and the Sturt Creek Outstation covers an area of 9,674 square kilometres (3,735 sq mi). Sturt Creek alone covers 3,150 square kilometres (1,220 sq mi).

== History ==
The station was established some time prior to 1900. In 1900 the property was owned by Messrs Cahill and Button. Button found some small nuggets of gold by accident not far from the homestead while on his way home. The value of his find was about £100.

By 1901 the station was carrying about 700 head of cattle.

The area has a tropical climate and often receives high rainfall during the monsoon. In March 1904 the station recorded just under 3.5 inches (89 mm) of rain in 45 minutes.

Two men named Shellie and Hansen struck gold while drilling for water at Ruby Plains in 1931. Gold was found at a depth of about 200 feet (61 m) and the two men lodged a claim shortly after at Halls Creek.

An Aboriginal woman named Judy was murdered at Ruby Plains by another Aboriginal woman named Topsy in 1944.

In 2008 it was placed on the market and passed in at auction for A$38 million. S. Kidman & Co. were hoping to attract a price of A$44 million.

== James Darcy ==
James "Jimmy" Darcy was a stockman at Ruby Plains who fell from his horse while mustering cattle in 1917. The seriously injured Darcy was transported by buggy for 12 hours to Halls Creek for treatment, despite there being no hospital or doctor in town. The postmaster, Mr Tuckett, telegraphed Perth using Morse code for advice and was told the stockman had a ruptured bladder and would need to be operated on immediately. With no medical instruments or anaesthetic, Tuckett operated while being advised by Dr Holland; the operation took seven hours to complete. The following day complications set in, and it became essential that a doctor come to the town. By this stage Darcy's plight had caught the imagination of the Australian public who were avidly following the story. Holland made his way to Derby on a cattle boat and was driven the final 555 kilometres (345 mi) to Halls Creek by T-Model Ford and a horse and silky, only to find that Darcy had died the day before he arrived. This event was what inspired John Flynn to establish the Royal Flying Doctor Service.

== See also ==
- List of ranches and stations
- List of the largest stations in Australia
