= Halls Creek (Ohio) =

Coordinates: 39°21′55″N 84°09′24″W

Location
- Country: United States
- State: Ohio
- County: Warren

Basin features
- Progression: Little Miami River→ Ohio River→ Mississippi River→ Gulf of Mexico

Halls Creek is a stream in the U.S. state of Ohio. It is a tributary to the Little Miami River.

Halls Creek was named after an early settler.
