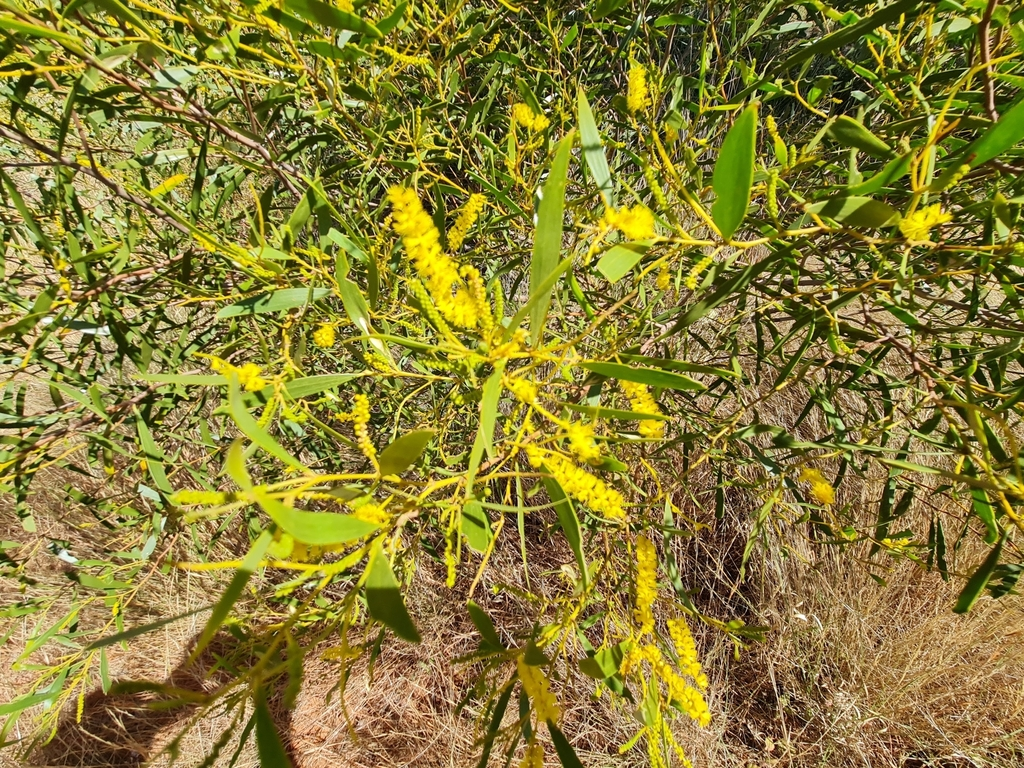

Scientific classification
- Kingdom: Plantae
- Clade: Embryophytes
- Clade: Tracheophytes
- Clade: Spermatophytes
- Clade: Angiosperms
- Clade: Eudicots
- Clade: Rosids
- Order: Fabales
- Family: Fabaceae
- Subfamily: Caesalpinioideae
- Clade: Mimosoid clade
- Genus: Acacia
- Species: A. stigmatophylla

Binomial name
- Acacia stigmatophylla Benth.
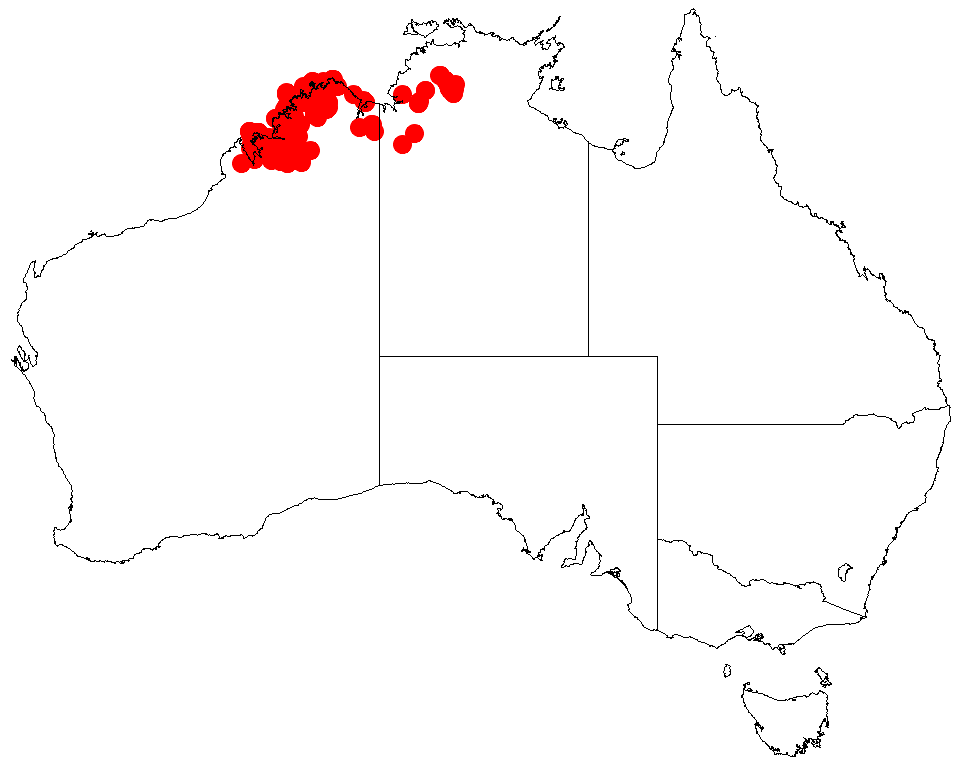
- Occurrence data from AVH

= Acacia stigmatophylla =

Species of legume

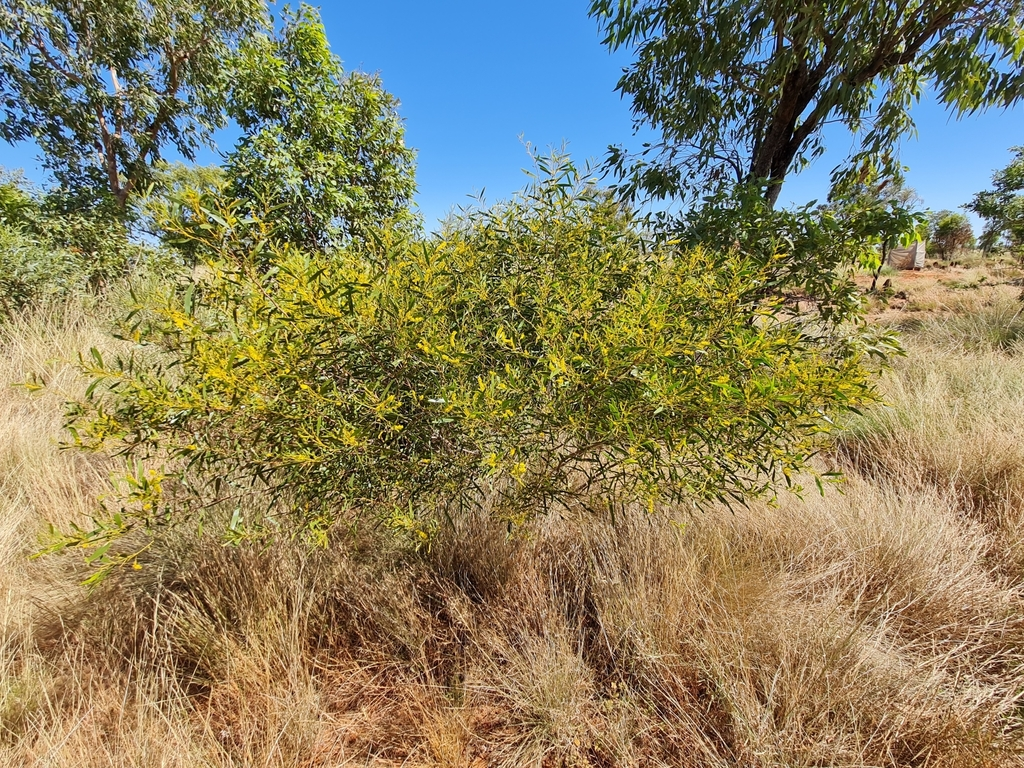
Habit near Halls Creek

Acacia stigmatophylla, also known as djulurd, is a shrub belonging to the genus Acacia and the subgenus Juliflorae the is endemic to northern parts of Western Australia.

== Description ==
The shrub typically grows to a height of 1 to 4 metres (3 to 13 ft) and has smooth dark grey coloured bark. The glabrous, angular to flattened branchlets have red-brown to light brown colour and have resinous ridges. The straight, green phyllodes have a narrowly elliptic to oblanceolate shape. The phyllodes have a length of 2.5 to 7 cm (0.98 to 2.76 in) and width of 6 to 23 mm (0.24 to 0.91 in) and a small knob-like mucro at the apex and three prominent longitudinal nerves. It blooms from January to October producing yellow flowers. The cupular flowers widely spaced and the petals have a prominent midrib. After flowering brown woody, narrowly oblanceolate, flat, seed pods form that are basally narrowed form. The pods have a length of 3 to 7 cm (1.2 to 2.8 in) and a width of 4.5 to 8.5 mm (0.18 to 0.33 in) and open elastically from the apex. The dark brown seeds inside have a broadly oblong-elliptic shape and are 4 to 6 mm (0.16 to 0.24 in) in length.

== Distribution ==
It is native to a large area in the Kimberley region of Western Australia from around Broome and east to the border with the Northern Territory where it is situated in a large variety of habitat growing in sometimes skeletal sandy soils over granite, sandstone or quartzite as a part of coastal monsoon forest on the hills and ranges above savannah grassland or open Eucalyptus woodland communities.

== See also ==
- List of Acacia species
