= Billiluna (Mindibungu) =

Community in Western Australia

- Town
- Interactive map of Billiluna
- Coordinates: 19.556°0′S 127.661°0′E
- Country: Australia
- State: Western Australia
- LGA: Shire of Halls Creek
- Location: 150 km (93 mi) south of Halls Creek

Government
  - State electorate: Kimberley
  - Federal division: Durack

Population
  - Total: 202 (UCL 2021)
- Mean max temp: 33.6 °C (92.5 °F)
- Mean min temp: 20.00 °C (68.00 °F)
- Annual rainfall: 557.4 mm (21.94 in)

Billiluna, also known as Mindibungu and Kururrungku, is a medium-sized Aboriginal community, located approximately 150 km (93 mi) south of Halls Creek in the Kimberley region of Western Australia, within the Shire of Halls Creek. In the 2016 census, Billiluna had a total population of 150 predominantly Aboriginal and Torres Strait Islander people.

== History ==
Billiluna was established as a permanent Aboriginal community around 1978 when Aboriginal people moved from the Balgo Mission to the Billiluna Station after the cattle station's pastoral lease had been transferred from a private company to the Aboriginal Lands Trust. It was incorporated as an Aboriginal corporation in 1979, and construction of houses and schools began in that year.

== Description and governance ==
The community, also known as Kururrungku and Mindibungu, is located around 150 km (93 mi) south of Halls Creek, in the Shire of Halls Creek. The community is managed through its incorporated body, Mindibungu Aboriginal Corporation, incorporated under the Aboriginal Councils and Associations Act 1976 on 12 December 1979. The corporation has run the Kurruungku Store since 1996.

== Demographics ==
In the 2016 census, Billiluna had a total population of 150, including 133 Aboriginal and Torres Strait Islander people in 17 households.

This represents a drop of over 100 people since the 2011 census, when there was a total population of 258 (244 Aboriginal and Torres Strait Islander people).

== Native title ==
The community is located within the determination area of the Tjurabalan people (WAD160/1997) native title claim.

== Education ==
Children of school age at Billiluna attend the Kururrungku Catholic Education Centre. The school caters for approximately 80 enrolled students between pre-primary to year 10 with 7 registered teachers and a principal.

== Town planning ==
Billiluna Layout Plan No. 1 has been prepared in accordance with State Planning Policy 3.2 Aboriginal Settlements. Layout Plan No. 1 was endorsed by the community on 22 September 2011, and by the Western Australian Planning Commission on 24 July 2012. A third amendment was made in September 2020.
