= Lake Argyle =

Lake in Western Australia

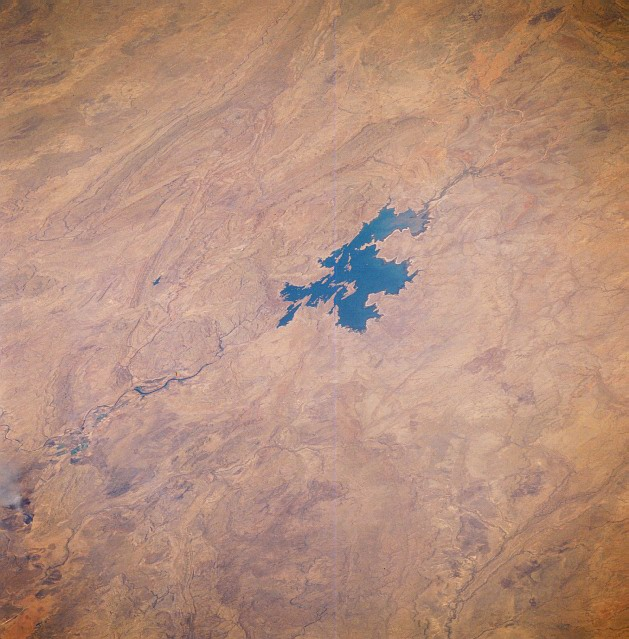
- Lake Argyle seen from space, August 1985. The main channel of the Ord River (dark, meandering feature) north of the lake is visible as it drains northward, eventually emptying into the Joseph Bonaparte Gulf. Low, folded mountains can be identified east and west of this river valley.

- Location in Western Australia
- Interactive map of Lake Argyle
- Location: near Kununurra; East Kimberley, Western Australia
- Coordinates: 16°20′08″S 128°44′37″E
- Type: Freshwater reservoir
- Primary inflows: Ord River, Bow River
- Primary outflows: Ord River
- Catchment area: 46,100 km^{2} (17,800 sq mi)
- Basin countries: Australia
- First flooded: 1971
- Max. length: 67 kilometres (42 mi)
- Max. width: 10 kilometres (6.2 mi)
- Surface area: 703 km^{2} (271 sq mi)
- Water volume: 10,763 gigalitres (8.726×10^{6} acre⋅ft; 2.582 cu mi)
- Website: www.lakeargyle.com
- References: Water Corporation

Ramsar Wetland
- Official name: Lakes Argyle and Kununurra
- Designated: 7 June 1990
- Reference no.: 478

Lake Argyle is Western Australia's largest and Australia's second largest freshwater man-made reservoir by volume. The reservoir is part of the Ord River Irrigation Scheme and is located near the East Kimberley town of Kununurra. The lake flooded large parts of the Shire of Wyndham-East Kimberley on the Kimberley Plateau about 80 kilometres (50 mi) inland from the Joseph Bonaparte Gulf, close to the border with the Northern Territory.

The primary inflow is the Ord River, while the Bow River and many other smaller creeks also flow into the dam. The lake is a DIWA-listed wetland. Lake Argyle and Lake Kununurra were listed in 1990 as Ramsar Convention protected wetlands. Argyle mine was previously situated here from 1985 until November 2020 following several years of discoveries and yielded 865 million carats of diamonds.

== History and construction ==
The construction of the Ord River Dam was completed in 1971 by Dravo Corporation. The dam was officially opened the following year. The dam wall is 335 metres (1,099 ft) long, and 98 metres (322 ft) high. The earth-fill only dam wall at Lake Argyle is the most efficient dam in Australia in terms of the ratio of the size of the dam wall to the amount of water stored. The lake was named after the property it partly submerged, Argyle Downs.

Ord River Dam post office opened on 1 March 1969 and closed on 15 November 1971 demonstrating the approximate duration of the construction camp.

In 1996, the spillway wall was raised by 6 metres (20 ft), which doubled the dam's capacity. Sediment flowing into the dam caused concerns in the mid-1990s that the dam's capacity could be dramatically reduced. By 2006 continual regeneration of the upper Ord catchment appeared to have reduced the amount of sediment inflow.

The dam received a Historic Engineering Marker from Engineers Australia as part of its Engineering Heritage Recognition Program.

== Geography ==
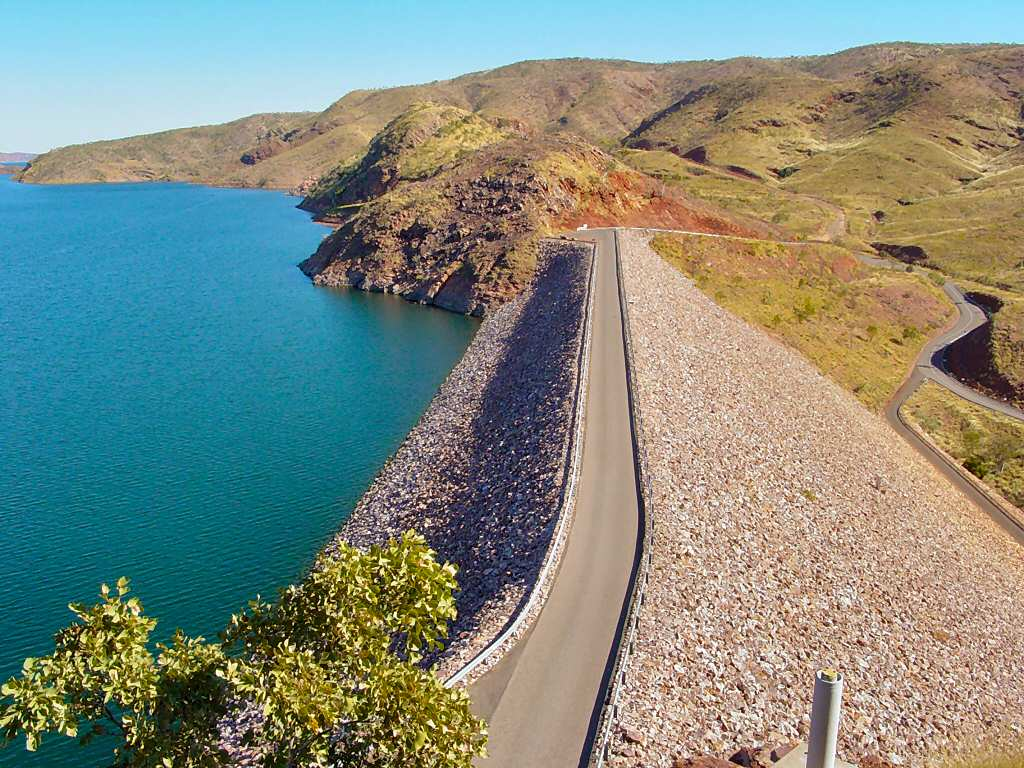
Dam wall

Lake Argyle normally has a surface area of about 1,000 square kilometres (390 sq mi). The storage capacity, to the top of the spillway is 10,763 gigalitres (3.801×10^{11} cu ft). The lake filled to capacity in 1973, and the spillway flowed until 1984. Lake Argyle's usual storage volume is 5,797 gigalitres (2.047×10^{11} cu ft), making it the largest reservoir in Australia. The combined Lake Gordon/Lake Pedder system in Tasmania is larger but is two dams connected by a canal. At maximum flood level, Lake Argyle would hold 35,000 gigalitres (1.2×10^{12} cu ft) of water and cover a surface area of 2,072 square kilometres (800 sq mi).

Higher areas have become permanent islands within the lake's area.

== Irrigation ==
Lake Argyle, together with Lake Kununurra, is part of the Ord River Irrigation Scheme. There are currently some 150 square kilometres (58 sq mi) of farmland under irrigation in the East Kimberly region. The original plan was for dam water to irrigate rice crop for export to China. However these plans were scuppered as waterfowl, particularly magpie geese ate rice shoots quicker than they could be planted. Other crops are now grown, but Lake Argyle still remains Australia's most under-utilised lake.

== Flora and fauna ==
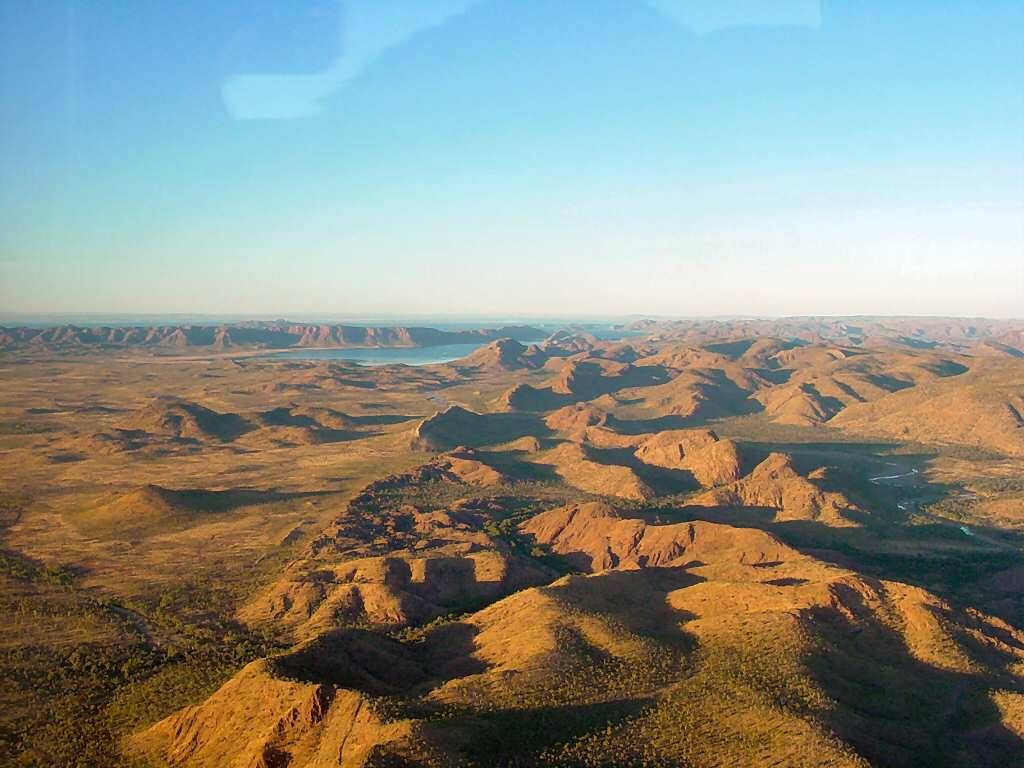
View from downstream viewing the Ord River after it leaves Lake Argyle

The damming of the Ord River has caused major changes to the environment. Flows to the Ord River have been severely reduced. Within Lake Argyle itself a thriving new eco-system has developed. The lake is recognised as an important wetland area under the Ramsar Convention; with Lake Kununurra it forms the Lakes Argyle and Kununurra Ramsar Site.

The lake is now home to 26 species of native fish and a population of freshwater crocodiles currently estimated at some 25,000. Fish species that are present in Lake Argyle include barramundi, southern saratoga, archer fish, silver cobbler, mouth almighty, long tom, bony bream and sleepy cod. While the official website states that only incidentally a saltwater crocodile is found, other experts disagree.

Cane toads reached the dam in late 2008, mostly via traveling along the Victoria Highway, with numbers rising significantly during the 2009 summer.

=== Birds ===
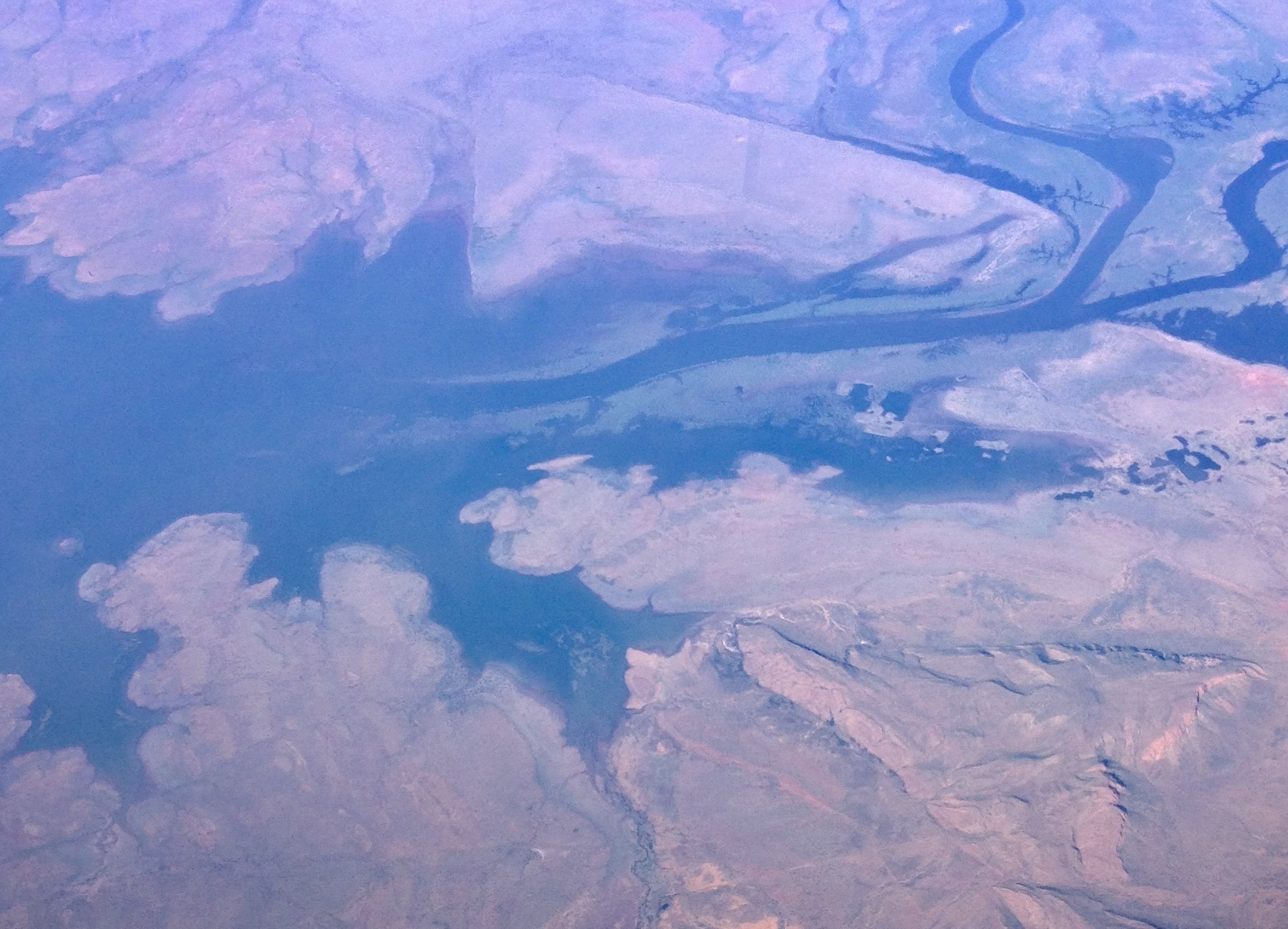
Aerial view at southern end

The lake, with its surrounding mudflats and grasslands, has been identified by BirdLife International as an Important Bird Area (IBA) because it supports about 150,000 waterbirds with twelve species being represented in large enough numbers to be considered internationally significant. The mud flats and grasslands are the natural habitat of eight wader species also represented in internationally significant numbers, along with a healthy population of Australian bustards which are considered a "near threatened" species. Birds for which the lake has global importance include magpie geese, wandering whistling-ducks, green pygmy-geese, Pacific black ducks, hardheads, black-necked storks, white-headed stilts, red-capped plovers, Oriental plovers, black-fronted dotterels, long-toed stints and sharp-tailed sandpipers.

Common larger-bodied bird species found at the lake include the Australian pelican, black swan, eastern great egret, royal spoonbill, osprey and wedge-tailed eagle. Common smaller-bodied bird species include the spinifex pigeon, peaceful dove, common sandpiper, white-winged tern and budgerigar, while mid-sized bird species include the red-winged parrot, blue-winged kookaburra and barking owl.

Some threats identified by the IBA include invasive weed and animal species, such as the cane toad, as well as agricultural uses, free range cattle and feral ungulates that may be over-grazing in the shallow areas around the lake. The IBA recommends that a fence be installed in the important shallows in the south and east to prevent all ungulates from entering those lake areas.

== See also ==
- List of reservoirs and dams in Western Australia
- Water security in Australia
