= Tanami Desert =

Desert in Northern Australia

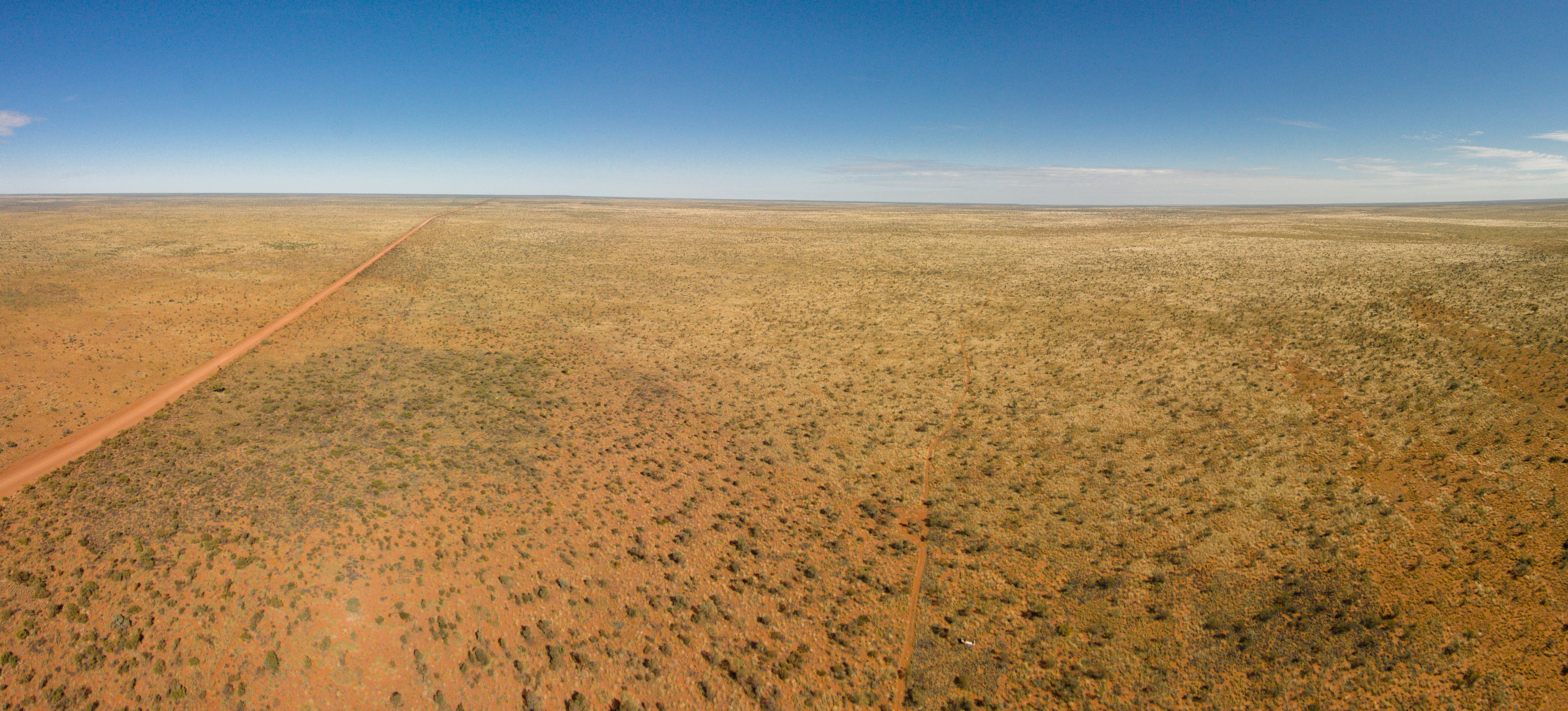
- Tanami Desert, 2014

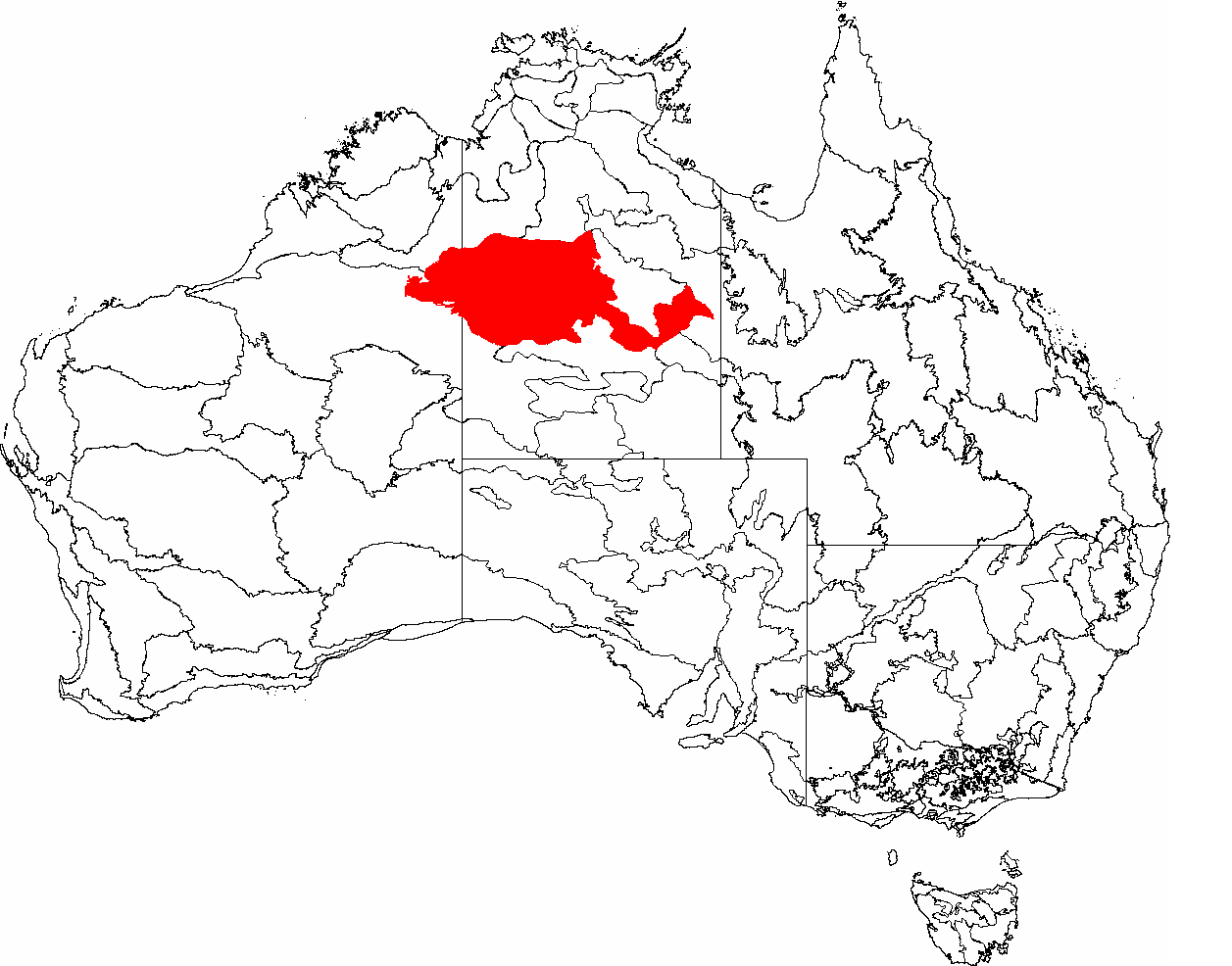
- The IBRA regions, with Tanami highlighted in red
- Area: 259,972.77 km^{2} (100,376.05 mi^{2})

Geography
- Country: Australia
- State: Western Australia, Northern Territory
- Coordinates: 20°S 130°E

The Tanami Desert (Warlpiri: Jarnami) is a desert in northern Australia, situated in the Northern Territory and Western Australia.

It has a rocky terrain and small hills. The Tanami was the Northern Territory's final frontier and was not fully explored by Australians of European descent until well into the twentieth century. It is traversed by the Tanami Track.

The name Tanami is thought to be an anglicisation of the Warlpiri name for the area, "Jarnami", meaning "never die". This referred to certain rock holes in the desert which were said never to run dry.

Under the name Tanami, the desert is classified as an interim Australian bioregion, comprising 25,997,277 hectares (64,240,670 acres).

== Biological resources ==
According to government commissions, the Tanami desert is uniquely "one of the most important biological areas to be found in Australia particularly as it provides refuge for several of Australia's rare and endangered species".

The species that are found include:

- Western chestnut mouse (Pseudomys nanus)
- Little native mouse (Pseudomys delicatulus)
- Long-tailed planigale (Planigale ingrami)

Significant bird species include:

- Grey falcon (Falco hypoleucos)
- Australian painted snipe (Rostratulas)
- Freckled duck (Stictonetta naevosa)

== Mineral resources ==
There are several mines in the Tanami Desert including:

- The Granites gold mine
- Coyote Gold Mine

== Local indigenous groups ==
The Tanami Desert is part of Kukatja and Warlpiri country. The Tjurabalan live at the edge of the desert.

There are a large number of cultural sites in the Tanami.

== Southern Tanami Indigenous Protected Area ==
In July 2012, 10,000,000 hectares (25,000,000 acres) of the desert area (38% of the total bioregion) was declared an indigenous protected area or conservation zone.

== See also ==
- Deserts of Australia
- List of deserts by area
