= Ord River =

River in Kimberley region of Western Australia

Ord River Miriwoong: Goonoonoorrang
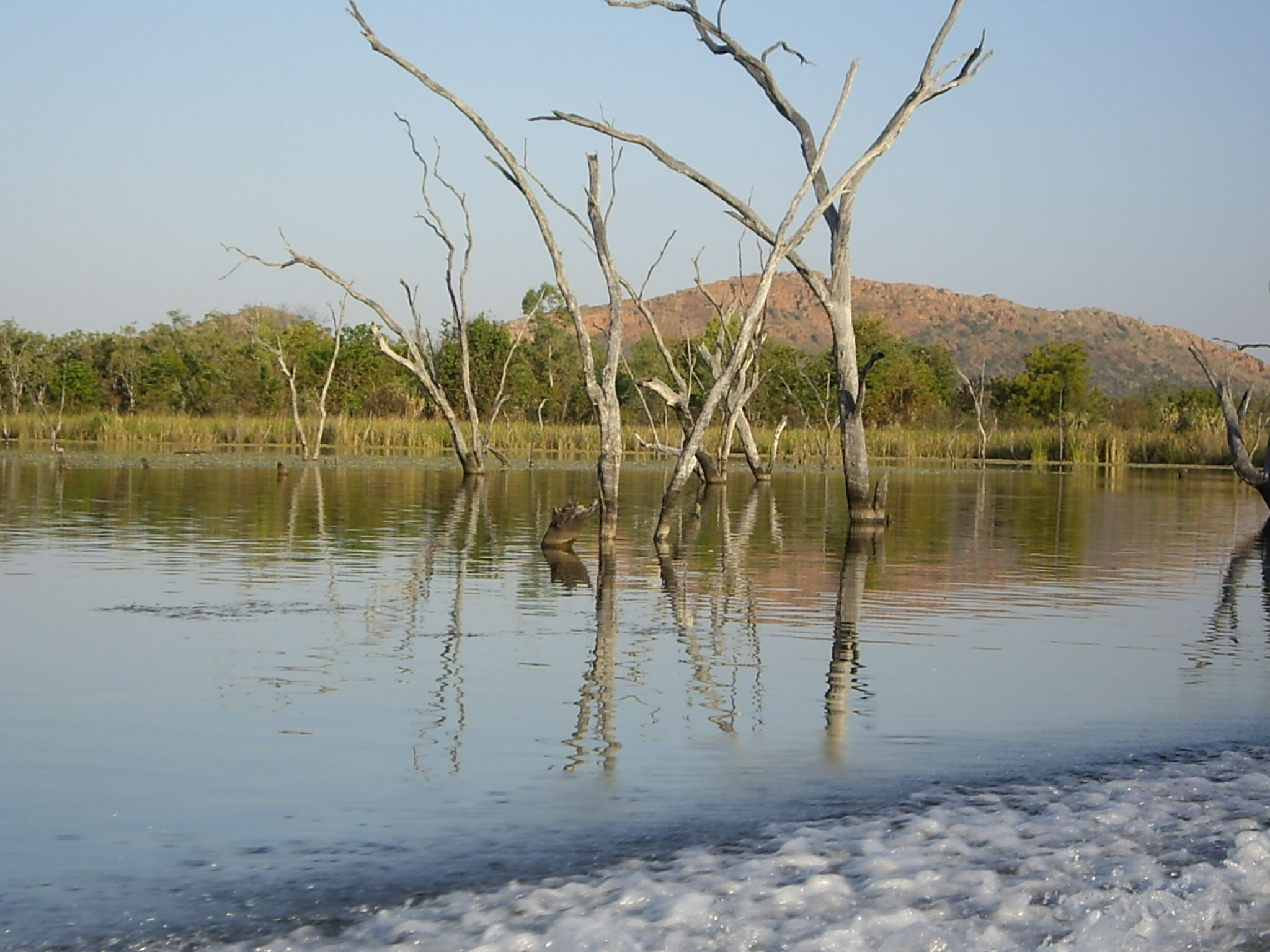
- Ord River from a boat

Location
- Country: Australia

Physical characteristics
- Source
  - location: Kimberley Plateau
  - coordinates: 15°30′S 128°21′E
  - elevation: 531 m (1,742 ft)
- Mouth
  - location: Cambridge Gulf, Timor Sea
  - elevation: 0 m (0 ft)
- Length: 651 km (405 mi)
- Basin size: 55,100 km^{2} (21,300 mi^{2}) 55,385 km^{2} (21,384 mi^{2})
- Discharge
  - location: Cambridge Gulf (near mouth)
  - average: 150 m^{3}/s (4,700,000 ML/a)

Basin features
- River system: Ord River
- Tributaries
  - left: Behn River, Negri River, Nicholson River
  - right: Dunham River, Bow River, Panton River

The Ord River is a 651-kilometre-long (405 mi) river in the Kimberley region of Western Australia. The river's catchment covers 55,100 square kilometres (21,274 sq mi).

The lower Ord River and the confluence with Cambridge Gulf create the most northern estuarine environment in Western Australia.

The Ord River Irrigation Scheme was built in stages during the 20th century. Australia's largest artificial lake by volume, Lake Argyle, was completed in 1972.

The lower reaches of the river support an important wetland area known as the Ord River Floodplain, a protected area that contains numerous mangrove forests, lagoons, creeks, flats, and extensive floodplains.

The traditional owners are the Miriwoong and Gajerrong peoples who have inhabited the area for thousands of years and know the Ord River as Goonoonoorrang. In a letter to the Surveyor General, dated 12 October 1959, Louise Gardiner, Secretary of the Nomenclature Advisory Committee wrote: "'Cununurra'...means 'Black Soil'. It is the native name for Ord River. Perhaps it may be the native name for any big river, but according to Mary Durack it is definitely the name for the 'Ord'."

== English naming ==
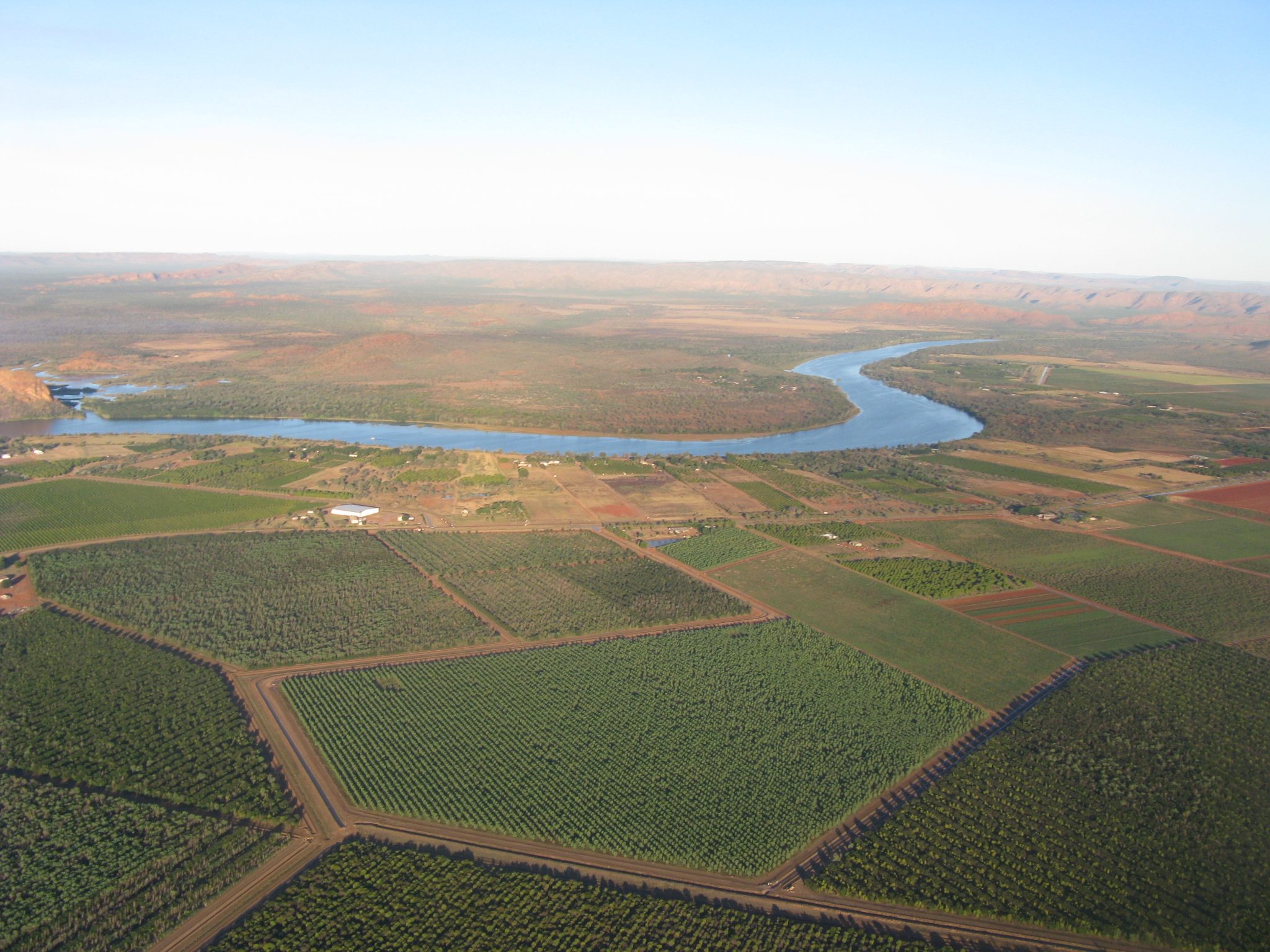
Ord River sandalwood plantation near Kununurra

It was given its English name in honour of Harry Ord, Governor of Western Australia from 1877 to 1880, by Alexander Forrest on 2 August 1879.

The headwaters of the Ord River are located below the 983-metre (3,225 ft) Mount Wells and initially flow east and around the edge of Purnululu National Park before heading north through Lake Argyle then passing west of Kununurra and discharging into the Cambridge Gulf, which is at the southern extremity of the Joseph Bonaparte Gulf, Timor Sea. The river has 35 tributaries of which the five longest are Bow River, Nicholson River, Dunham River, Panton River and Negri rivers.

== Ord River Irrigation Scheme ==
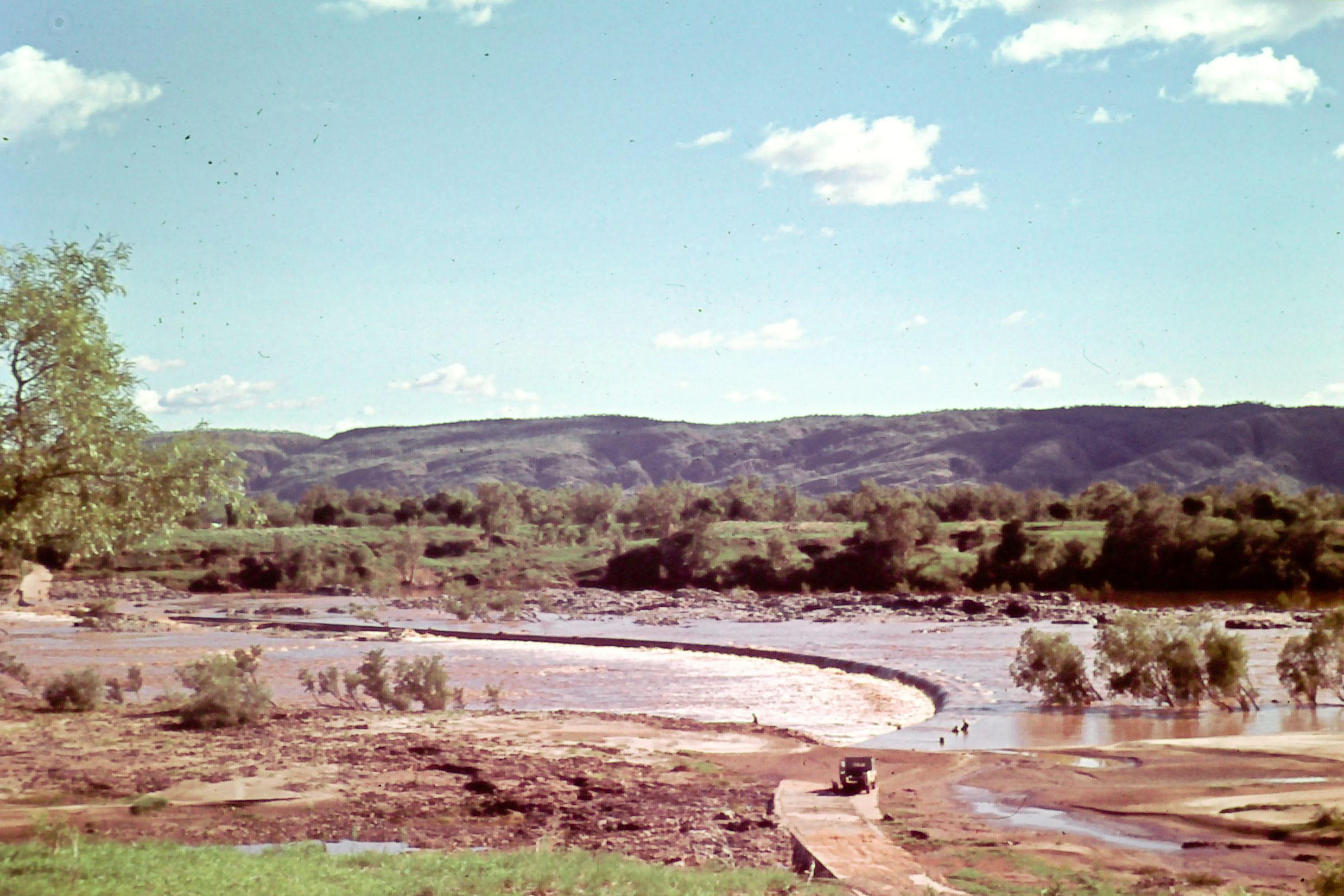
Crossing the Ord river at Kununurra, c. 1960

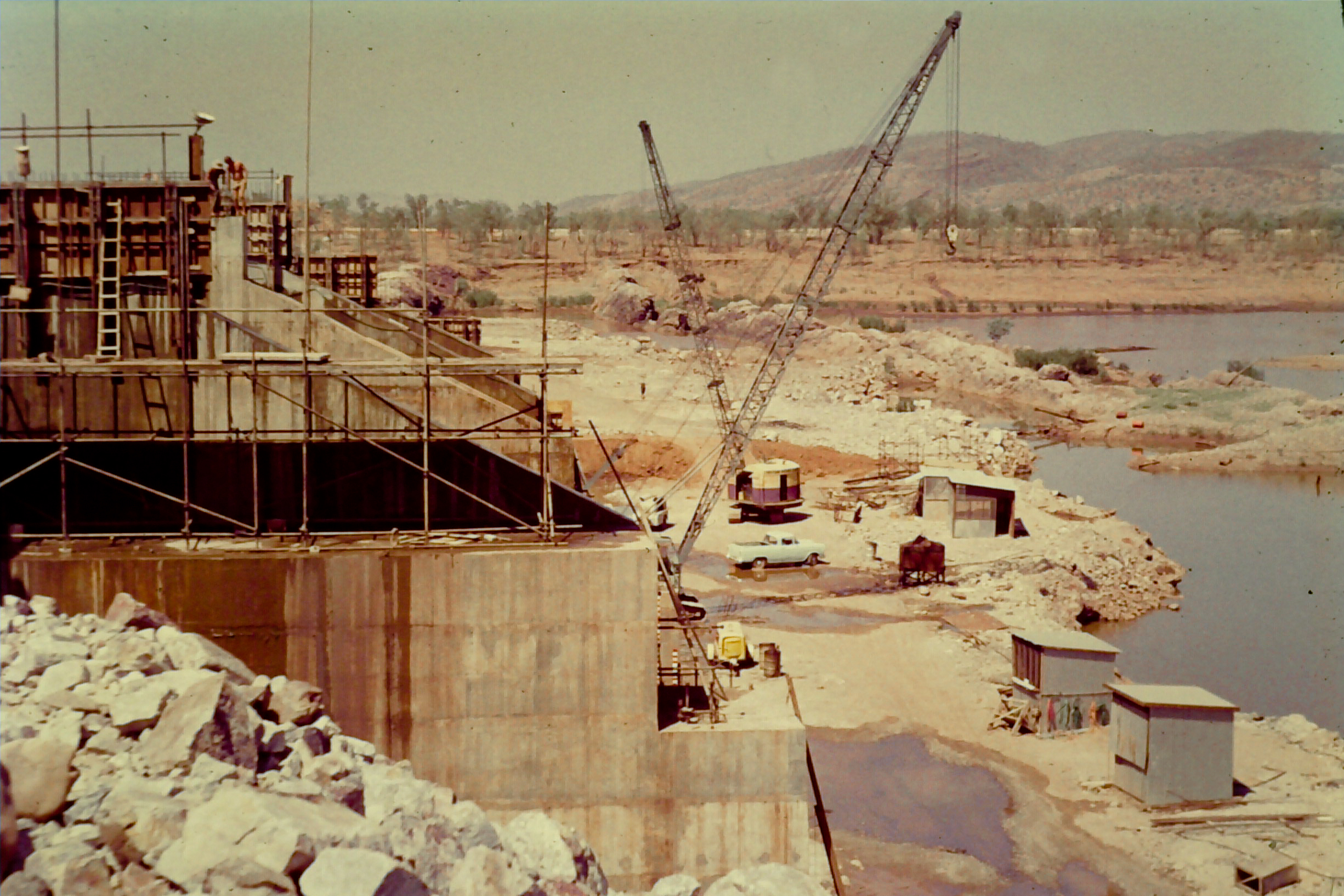
Ord Diversion Dam under construction, c. 1962

The idea of damming the Ord was first mentioned over 100 years ago, when the Western Australia Commissioner of Tropical Agriculture, Adrian Despeissis, suggested,

Substantial wooden dams constructed on a double row of jarrah piles driven into the bed of the river, with a core wall of puddle clay between, would appear to form suitable weirs.

Between 1935 and 1942 drought affected the Kimberley Pastoral Industry, providing the key motivation for the Ord Scheme. The focus in 1937 was that a dam on the Ord could supplement the pastoral industry.

=== Ord River experimental station ===
Minister for Lands and Agriculture, Frank Wise, in 1937 wrote

...we set a plan in motion during the past twelve months in connection with the establishment of experimental areas on Ivanhoe Station somewhere near Carlton Reach.

Carlton Reach was the largest waterhole in the Kimberley, being naturally dammed and held back by the Bandicoot Bar, a quartzite rock bar that held back the waterhole for many miles forming a natural permanent lake.

In 1939, Michael Durack and Isaac Steinberg traveled to the region to investigate its suitability for resettling Jewish refugees. Any resettlement scheme would have involved irrigation works on the Ord.

By 1941 the Carlton Reach Research Station, also known as the Ord River Experimental Station, was set up by Kimberley Michael Durack for the Western Australia Department of Agriculture with funds, supposedly siphoned off from the Kalgoorlie pipeline and assistance from the Public Works Department.

=== Ord River dam surveys ===
Several possible dam sites were selected in August 1941 by the newly appointed Director of Works, R. J. Dumas, who spent three weeks in the East Kimberley with a party traveling on horseback along the Ord River and through the Ord River gorges in the Carr Boyd Range. Work continued at the Carlton Reach experimental station for Kim Durack with assistance from his brother William A. Durack, on various agricultural experiments, centred on supplementing the pastoral industry.

=== Involving the Commonwealth ===
Early in 1944 Dumas wrote to the Federal Government, advising of the soil, botanical, erosion and engineering surveys about to take place in the East Kimberley, explaining that the project must become largely a national one and any assistance from the Commonwealth would be welcome. By May 1944 there was a large body of agriculturalists, botanists and surveyors carrying out investigations in the vicinity of Carlton Reach. The Aboriginal people who lived in the Ord River basin were decimated through killing and the spread of introduced diseases.

=== Establishment of the Kimberley Research Station ===
It would be another two years before the Commonwealth Government became involved, with the establishment of a joint CSIRO and Western Australia Department of Agriculture facility. As the Carlton Reach, Ord River experimental station site was river alluvium (red soil) and most of the surveyed agricultural land was "Cununurra Clay" (blacksoil – Volcanic soil eroded from the Antrim Plateau Volcanics), it was moved to a new site further down river and the new Kimberley Research Station (KRS) was established in 1946.

=== Justifying dam construction ===
In 1951, the KRS Supervisory Committee (KRSSC) indicated that sugar and rice were two cash crops that could justify dam construction. By 1953, 150 varieties of rice were being tested.

Over the 13 years between 1946 and 1959 various agricultural experiments were undertaken at KRS and in April 1959 the KRSSC recommended the establishment of a pilot farm. In August 1959, the Commonwealth Government made a grant of £5m to the Government of Western Australia, most to be used for the Ord River Scheme.

=== Origin of the Ord River Irrigation Area ===
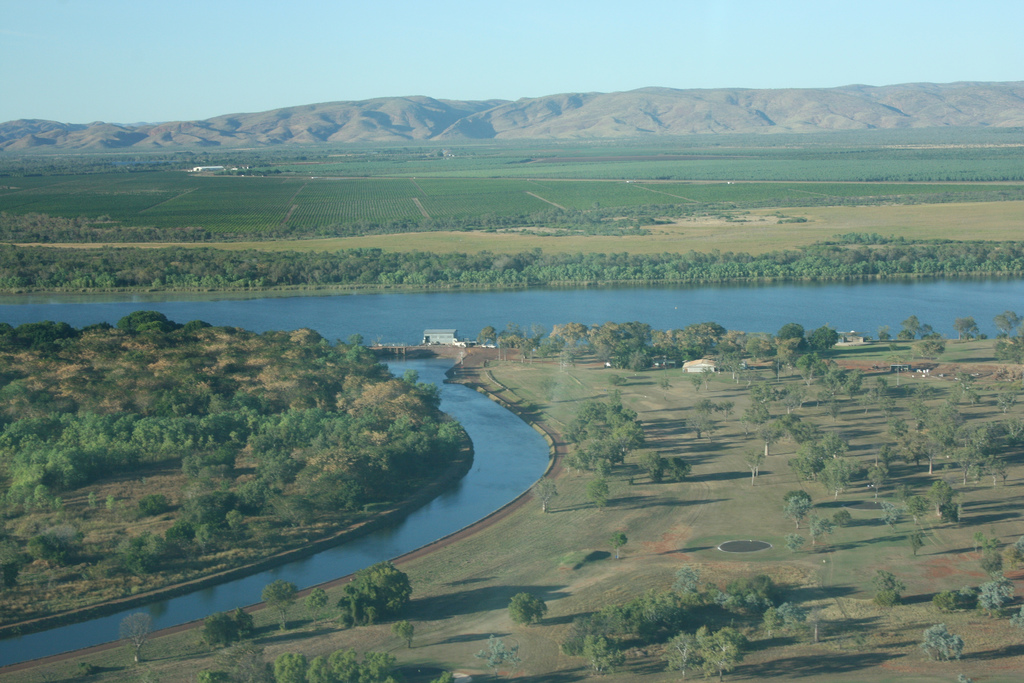
Pumping station, river and irrigated fields

The Ord River Irrigation Area (ORIA), which was originally known as the Ord River Irrigation Scheme (ORIS) or Ord River Project, when it was approved by the Commonwealth Government, late in 1959 and began in 1960 with the establishment of the town of Kununurra, which was gazetted a town on 10 February 1961.

=== The first dam – Ord River Diversion Dam ===
The construction of the Ord River Diversion Dam started in late 1960 and was officially opened in July 1963 by Prime Minister Robert Menzies. The Ord River Diversion Dam holds back Lake Kununurra, which gravity feeds the Ord River Irrigation Area with water via the Main Channel. The main channel is visible in the photograph with Lake Kununurra, Ord River (formerly the Carlton Reach waterhole, Ord River) in the background.

=== The Ord River pilot farm ===
To test the commercial viability of the ORIA, the WA Government, passed an act of parliament, known as the Northern Development (Ord River) Act, and in October 1960, ratified an agreement with the company Northern Developments, Ord River Pty Ltd to set up and run the first "pilot farm." This was backed by the WA Government but was to run as a commercial farming venture.

By November 1960 the first 81 hectares (200 acres) had been chain-dozed and cleared, a channel and pumps were in place, to irrigate the first commercial rice crop that had been planted on the new pilot farm. This was almost three years before the completion of the Ord River Diversion Dam and main channel, so the pilot farm irrigated by pumping water from the Carlton Reach waterhole.

=== Commercial irrigation farming ===
Allocation of commercial farm land during Stage 1 of the project was allocated in stages, with the first group of farmers arriving in 1962 and final allocations completed in 1966. 30 farms produced mostly cotton, however pest problems soon became apparent. The early 1970s saw the application of large amounts of pesticides on crops. The primary pest was the caterpillar Helicoverpa armigera which developed resistance to the pesticides. The resulting low crop yields combined with a drop in world cotton prices led to suspension of the commercial cotton industry in the region.

=== The second dam – Ord River (main) Dam ===
Work started on the main Ord River Dam in 1969 and was completed before the official opening on 30 June 1972 by Prime Minister William McMahon, when he said:

This marks the beginning of Ord stage two.

The main Ord River Dam, known locally as "Top Dam" holds back the waters of the Ord River in Lake Argyle. The Ord scheme created Lake Argyle, which is Australia's largest dam reservoir, covering an area of 741 square kilometres (286 sq mi).

=== Disputed views about economic value of the irrigation scheme ===
Until the mid-2010s most reports of the scheme derided its lack of economic return. In 2013, the Wilderness Society estimated that $1.45 billion had been spent on the Ord Irrigation Scheme for a return of 17 cents for every dollar spent. In 2016 the Auditor General for Western Australia reported that "The sustained social and economic benefits underpinning the decision to proceed with this $529 million investment have not been realized. Nor is there a plan to track and assess them." The Australia Institute reported that "Attempts to develop northern Australia by subsidizing capital-intensive industries like irrigated agriculture have a long and unimpressive history. An example is the Ord River Scheme which currently supports just 260 jobs despite $2 billion spent and decades of effort.". A turnaround in fortunes may be on the horizon, with the second half of the 2010s seeing new crops being planted and fresh fruit markets in both South-East Australia and Asia being exploited with greater economic success. In the late 2010s the opening of export markets in China gave the Ord Scheme a potential basis for financial sustainability.

== The Ord River irrigation area today ==
The Ord River dams provide water for irrigation to over 117 square kilometres (45 sq mi) of farmland and extensions to the scheme are underway to allow irrigation of a further 440 square kilometres (170 sq mi). The main Ord River dam also generates power for the local community of Kununurra. By 2009 more than 60 different crops were grown in the Ord catchment area. One third of the area was used for sugar cane cultivation until the closure of the Ord Sugar Mill in 2007. In 2012 the release was approved of an additional 74 square kilometres (29 sq mi) of Stage 2 Goomig lands for irrigated agriculture, while the same year the West Australian Department of Agriculture conducted soil and water investigations of the Cockatoo Sands (red loamy sands) near the Ord River Irrigation Area, Kununurra. These investigations identified about 65 square kilometres (25 sq mi) of Cockatoo Sands and about 24 square kilometres (9.3 sq mi) of Pago Sands on Carlton Hill Station suitable for fodder or perennial crops. The Cockatoo Sands have great potential because they are well-drained and have capacity to support agriculture throughout the wet season. As part of the Water for Food government program, the Department of Agriculture also investigated an additional 300 square kilometres (120 sq mi) of Cockatoo soils north of Kununurra for possible expansion.

In 2009, the Rudd Government and Colin Barnett announced a development plan for the area. The plan emphasised community and infrastructure development including upgrades of Kununurra Airport and the port at Wyndham.

=== Power generation ===
The Ord River Dam Hydro Scheme is a privately funded, owned and operated power system in the East Kimberley region of Western Australia. It consists of a new 36 MW hydro electric power station at Lake Argyle interconnected, by lengthy 132 kV transmission lines, with existing diesel fuelled power systems at the Argyle diamond mine and the Kununurra township. The scheme can currently only produce 1% of the power the Snowy Mountains Scheme produces. The power station was constructed from 1995 to 1996.

=== Environmental effects ===
CSIRO research conducted in 2008 found that the water quality in the lower reaches of the river was good and that planned activities were not an ecological threat. However, salinity and erosion are becoming an issue in the area, due to the rising of the water table in the area. The use of groundwater drains has been suggested by hydrologist Tony Smith, as a possible remedy to salinity problems.

Some concerns have been raised that the large body of water created by the dam could attract Asian insects and birds which may transmit dangerous viruses such as avian influenza.

Like so many other experiments in tropical agriculture, the scheme initially failed because of difficulties growing crops and attack from pests. Today the irrigated areas successfully produce a variety of fruits and vegetables, with the most recent crop being sandalwood.

Associated wetland areas have been preserved within the Lakes Argyle and Kununurra Ramsar Site. Ord water quality and flow contributed to the disappearance of the Common Banana Prawn. The site forms part of the Ord Irrigation Area Important Bird Area (IBA), so identified by BirdLife International because of its importance for wild birds, especially estrildid finches.

=== Logistics ===
Much of the produce is exported to South East Asia. Sugar, which was produced from the late 1990s until the end of 2007 in the ORIA was trucked to Wyndham where it was exported to a Korean-owned food manufacturing plant in Surabaya, Indonesia. Fruit and vegetables are sold to domestic markets and are trucked to all capital cities. The ORIA is also home to the largest commercial Indian Sandalwood plantations in the world.

== See also ==
- Irrigation in Australia
- List of rivers of Australia
- List of watercourses in Western Australia

== General references ==
- Ord Development Council. Conference (1991: Kununurra, W.A) 50 years of Ord irrigation: review & future perspectives: conference proceedings, Kununurra, Western Australia, 1–3 November 1991 / sponsored by Minister for North West Agriculture, Water Resources, Ord Development Council. Kununurra: Ord Development Council, 1991.
