= Tjapartji Kanytjuri Bates =

Tjapartji Kanytjuri Bates (c.1933–2015), also spelt Taparti, was an Australian Aboriginal artist based in Warakurna, Wanarn, and Warburton communities in the Gibson Desert. She was of the Ngaanyatjarra people. Known to be active from 1991, her work incorporates media of paint, canvas, glass and felt, and is particularly centred around interpretations of Tjukurrpa from her mother and father.

Bates was a prolific artist and her work has been shown in over 20 exhibitions, as well as the National Gallery of Victoria and the National Gallery of Australia.

== Early life ==
Bates was born around 1933 in Yinunmaru, in the Gibson Desert. Her name was sometimes spelt Taparti, and she was also known as Kanytjuri. Her skin group was Karimarra.

== Career ==
In the early 1990s, she joined the Warburton Arts Project, which owns the "largest collection of Indigenous art in Australia that is held by Aboriginal people themselves", where she produced her first known work, Kungkarrangkalpa at Wanarn, in 1991.

In the late 1990s, Bates returned to Wanarn and continued to paint. Near the end of her life, she became a resident at the Wanarn Aged Care Facility, which offers a weekly painting program in conjunction with the Warakurna Arts Centre. Her style at this time became looser and more abstract. In addition to work produced through this program, Bates also painted on the materials around her at the facility, including pieces of cardboard and pillowcases.

== Themes and style ==
Bates' art is focused on Tjukurrpa from her mother and father, particularly Kungarrangkalpa (Seven Sisters) and Warmarrla Tjukurrpa, and features distinctive styles of "unusual symmetries and circular motifs," as well as "traditional motifs and iconographic forms".

== Awards ==
In 1998, Bates was awarded the Normandy Heritage Art Prize at the National Indigenous Heritage Art Awards, organised by the Australian Heritage Commission. Her winning work was a large slump glass panel.

== Exhibitions ==
Bates' works were displayed posthumously as part of Songlines: Tracking the Seven Sisters, a collaborative exhibition between senior custodians of Aboriginal lands in the Central and Western deserts and the National Museum of Australia, among other partners. Bates' work in the exhibition (which ran from September 2017 to February 2018 at the NMA) illustrates and interprets Seven Sisters songlines. The exhibition continues to tour internationally, until 2024/5 and has been shown in Plymouth, UK; Berlin, Germany; and is still to be shown in Paris, France.

The following is a list of other exhibitions of Bates' works.

Year	Exhibit
1998	National Indigenous Heritage Art Award, The Art of Place exhibition
2004	Colour Power: Aboriginal Art post 1984, National Gallery of Victoria
2006	Pukurlpatulatju Palyara Pirrtja: 'We Are Happy to Make Painting', Randell Lane Fine Arts, Perth Rawa-latju Nintirringkulatjaku,: 'Knowing is the Future', Alcaston Gallery, Melbourne Desert Mob, Araluen Gallery, Alice Springs Tjukurrpa Tjarralatju Palyara Mularapa: 'We Paint Really Strong Stories', Aboriginal and Pacific Art Gallery, Sydney
2007	Tjukurrpa Mularrpa Waylkumunu Pirni: 'Lots of Good True Stories', Randell Lane Fine Arts, Perth Kutju-One, Western Desert Mob, Ngaanyatjarra Lands Regional Exhibition, Lawrence Wilson Gallery, Perth Desert Mob, Araluen Gallery, Alice Springs Palyaralatju Pirrtja Puru Tjanpi Tjarra Puli Yuliyala: 'We are Making Paintings and Tjanpi in Puli Yuliya', New Paintings and Weavings from Warakurna Artists and Tjanpi Desert Weavers, Alcaston Gallery, Melbourne Tjukurtjalatju Palyarra: 'We are Painting our Stories', Aboriginal and Pacific Art Gallery, Sydney
2008	Watilu Minymalu Kulira Watjarra Tjukurrpa Purlkanya Mularrpa: 'Men and Women Know and Speak of Their Profound Knowledge', Randell Lane Fine Arts, Perth Kaparli Tjamu Nintipungku: 'This is the Deep Knowledge Our Old People Gave Us", Alcaston Gallery, Melbourne Desert Mob, Araluen Gallery, Alice Springs Warakurna Artists and wanarn Aged Care Paintings, Aboriginal and Pacific Art Gallery, Sydney
2009	Printingpa Ngaanya Yanku Kayili: 'Warakurna Paintings Travelling North', Outstation Gallery, Darwin Desert Mob, Araluen Gallery, Alice Springs Warakurna Artists Group Exhibition, Aboriginal and Pacific Art Gallery, Sydney
2010	Tjukurrpa Pulkatjara – The Power of the Law, South Australian Museum Warakurna Artists and Tjanpi Desert Weavers Exhibition, Short St Gallery, Broome, WA
2012	One Song Different Tune, Short St Gallery, Broome, WA
2017-2018	Songlines: Tracking the Seven Sisters, National Museum of Australia, Canberra, ACT; subsequently touring internationally

== Collections ==
Bates' work is also a part of the National Gallery of Victoria Collection, the Marshall Collection, the Merenda Collection, the Lagerberg-Swift Collection, the National Gallery of Australia Collection, the Harriet and Richard England Collection, the Lepley Collection and the W. & V. McGeoch Collection.
