= Pulpurru Davies =

- Born: Katapi Pulpurru c. 1943 near Yankaltjunku, Western Australia
- Occupation: Painter
- Years active: 1990–present
- Style: Western Desert art

Pulpurru Davies (born early 1940s) is an Aboriginal artist from central Australia. Most of her early life was spent living nomadically in the desert, until she and her family were settled at Warburton in the late 1960s. Part of her life in the bush was featured in the documentary People of the Australian Western Desert (1966). She has since become one of the earliest and most successful Ngaanyatjarra artists.

== Life ==
Pulpurru was born around the early 1940s. She was born near Yankaltjunku, a rockhole in the northeast Gibson Desert. Her family belong to the Ngaanyatjarra people, for whom Yankaltjunku is a sacred place. Pulpurru grew up living a traditional, nomadic way of life in the desert with her family. They moved from waterhole to waterhole in their traditional country. They lived this way up until the 1960s, by which time they were one of the last groups of nomadic people in Australia.

By the mid-1960s, Pulpurru's family were camped at Patjarr, which was only a rockhole at the time. They had been forced to stay in one place because of several years of drought, and Patjarr usually had a reliable supply of water. While they were living there, an ethnographic filmmaker named Ian Dunlop came and filmed the family in their daily routines. It was later made into a documentary, titled People of the Australian Western Desert (1966), produced by the Australian Commonwealth Film Unit. Pulpurru was an adult by that time.

We went and lived there at Patjarr rock hole when there was no water. We lived there for a long time. After a long time we saw a white man who came [...] We used to get up in the morning and put our carrying dish on our heads and walk off. He used to film us from behind. That white man filmed us as we gathered fruits, grains, and berries. That other lady and I and the children used to collect food and he used to film us. We would dig for small game, dig the animals from the burrow, kill them, pick them up and walk off. That man making them movie stayed here a long time and later on he went back home.

— Pulpurru Davies,

Like most other Ngaanyatjarra groups, Pulpurru and her family were moved out of the desert to settle at Warburton. They were brought there by government patrol officers in the late 1960s. At Warburton, Davies worked several domestic jobs. It was at Warburton that Davies began working in arts and crafts, at the Warburton Arts Project. Alongside other women, she learned to paint using modern Western techniques and how to make glasswork designs.

In the early 1990s, a road was built out to Patjarr, and Davies and her family returned to establish a permanent community there (Karilywara). This is where Davies now lives and paints. She paints for Kayili Artists, the community artists' co-operative.

== Art work ==
Davies paints events and stories from her country, and the Dreaming legends associated with it. Places often depicted in her paintings are Yankaltjunku (where she was born), Kiwarr (where her family used to dig for water), and Mirra Mirra (where one of Pulpurru's sons was born). She works with paints, tjanpi (grass weaving) and punu (wood carving).

Davies' work has been exhibited across Australia since 1990. It was first shown overseas in 1998, as part of a group exhibition at the Australian High Commission in Kuala Lumpur. She also had work featured in a major group exhibition in China in 2011 (called Tu Di – Shen Ti / Our Land – Our Body).

In 2007, one of her paintings, titled Kiwarr, was chosen as a finalist for the National Aboriginal and Torres Strait Islander Art Award (NATSIAA). It was eventually bought by the Museum and Art Gallery of the Northern Territory as part of its NATSIAA collection.

Other of Davies' work are held in the National Gallery of Victoria, the Queensland Gallery of Modern Art, the National Museum of Australia and the Kluge-Ruhe Aboriginal Art Collection of the University of Virginia. Some of her paintings are also displayed in the State Parliament building of Western Australia, and in a few major private galleries in Germany and the United States.
