= Ngaanyatjarra =

Indigenous people in Western Australia

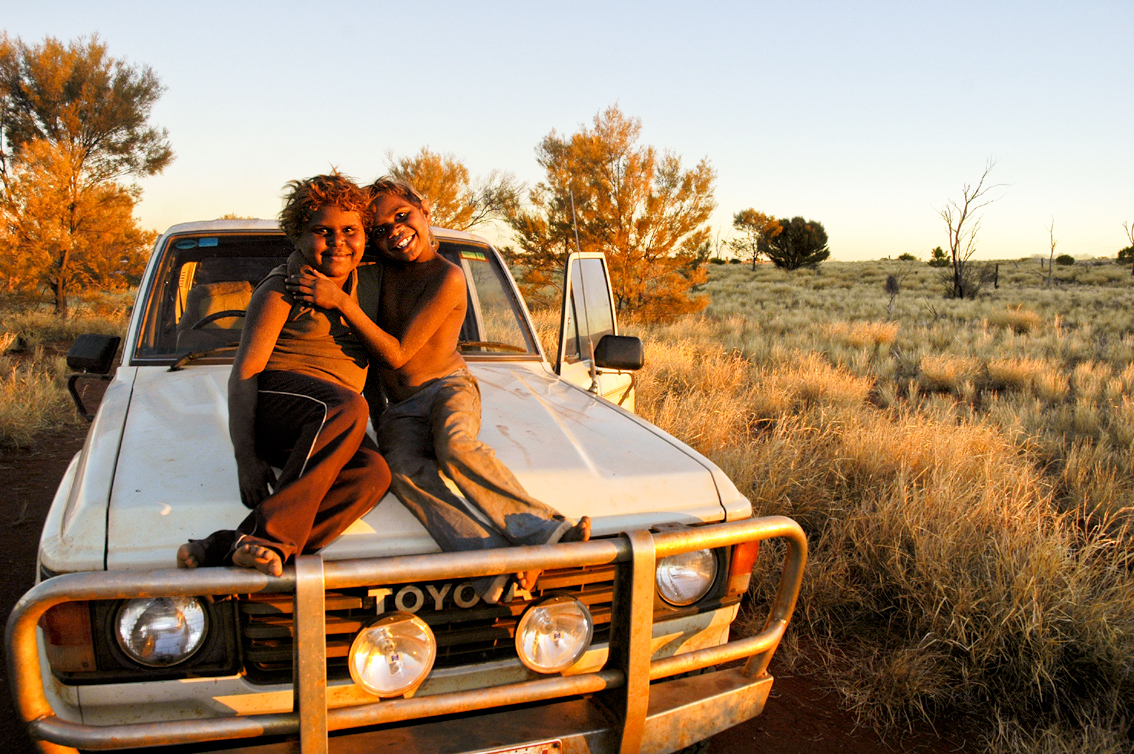
- Ngaanyatjarra children, 2006

Total population
- 1,600-2,700

Regions with significant populations
- Australia (Western Australia, Northern Territory)

Languages
- Ngaanyatjarra, English, Pitjantjatjara, Yankunytjatjara

Religion
- Aboriginal mythology

The Ngaanyatjarra, also known (along with the Pini) as the Nana, (Note: "Nana": alternative name, Ngan:adjara (Tindale 1974, p. 249).) are an Indigenous Australian cultural group of Western Australia. They are located in the Goldfields-Esperance region, as well as the Northern Territory.

== Language ==
Ngaanyatjarra is a Western Desert language belonging to the Wati branch of the Pama-Nyungan languages. Ngaatjatjarra is mutually intelligible with Ngaanyatjarra, and both are treated as dialects of the one language.

Ngaanya literally means "this" (that is, the demonstrative pronoun) and -tjarra means "with/having" (the comitative suffix); the compound term means "those that use 'ngaanya' to say 'this'". The neighbouring Ngaatjatjarra use ngaatja for "this". Many Ngaanyatjarra are multilingual, not only speaking English but also a number of other dialects in the area.

== Country ==
Ngaanyatjarra lands cover roughly 3% of the Australian landscape, a territory as large as that of the United Kingdom. Predominantly desert, they lie 1,000 kilometres (620 mi) away from the two nearest towns of Alice Springs and Kalgoorlie. The neighbouring tribes are the Martu and the Pitjantjatjara. They extend through parts of the North Western and Little Great and Little Sandy Deserts, the southeast Gascoyne region, the Gibson Desert, the Central Central Great Victoria Desert and the Western Central Ranges.

== Local government ==
The Shire of Ngaanyatjarraku covers 159,948 square kilometres (61,756 sq mi), and the Shire council is the local government authority responsible for the provision of services to the communities. The associated Ngaanyatjarra Council operates various services for the communities.

There are 10 small local centres within the Ngaanyatyarra Lands:

- Irrunytju (Wingellina)
- Papulankutja (Blackstone)
- Mantamaru (Jameson)
- Warburton
- Wanarn
- Warakurna
- Tjukurla
- Tjirrkarli
- Patjarr
- Kanpa

Kiwirrkurra and Yilka (Cosmo Newbery) lie outside the Lands, but are served by the Shire.

== Time zones ==
On July 1, 2024, the Ngaanyatjarra Lands standardised on Australian Western Standard Time (AWST). Previously the lands operated on two time zones: Yilka/Cosmo, Mantamaru/Jameson, Patjarr, Tjirrkarli, Wanarn and Warburton used AWST, while Blackstone, Kiwirrkurra, Tjukurla, Warakurna, and Irrunytju/Wingellina were on Australian Central Standard Time.

== People and society ==
The area inhabited by the Ngaanyatjarra people (yarnangu) has a record of human habitation going back some 10,000 years. In traditional society, the Ngaanyatjarra comprised numerous bands, usually constituted by a group of a dozen people. Males only reached marriageable age at around 30, after a thorough training and graduation through a complex initiatory system, that transformed tjilku (male children) into wati (men). Passage to this status was marked by the right to wear a red headband, though as post-initiates (tjawarratja) they were still required to dwell apart from the main camp as elders continued to instruct them. Learning the lore required that the initiates had to supply their elders with foodstuffs like meat, a scarce resource in the area. In this sense, the tjukurrpa system also functioned as a cross-generational mode of exacting obedience and an income from the younger men. Females entered into wedlock just after the onset of puberty. Ceremonial induction consisted of learning to absorb the complex details of tjukurrpa, namely the lore/law of the dreamtime. The process is graded so that full knowledge only comes after 50, the normal age after which one can begin gain recognition as a wati yirna or tjilpi, a thoroughly knowledgeable elder, though even 60-year-olds can still be denied that recognition.

The Ngaanyatjarra had a moiety system divided into sun-side (Tjirntulukultul(pa)) and shade-side (Ngumpalurrungkatja), with a 6 section classification.

Sun-side

- Tjarurru men have Purungu children as the offspring of marriage to either Panaka or Yiparrka women
- Panaka men marry only Tjarurru women, producing Karimarra offspring
- Yiparrka men marrying a Tjarurru women have Milangka offspring

Shade-side

- Purungu men have Tjarurru through marriage to either Karimarra or Milangka women.
- Karimarra men only marry Purungu women to have Panaka children
- Milangka men marry Purungu women and produce Yiparrka children.

Estimates of the number of Ngaanyatjarra range from 1,600, referring to permanent residents and 2,700, including a more mobile people of Ngaanyatjarra descent, who often visit the area. Though life is generally peaceful, the adaptation to modern society has produced considerable trauma and alienation, as the genealogical continuity of family structures has suffered disruption from numerous accidents or family violence, including sexual abuse and assault, and suicide. The area is "dry" meaning that the destructive effects of excessive alcoholic consumption are not in evidence throughout their communities, and longevity has been a characteristic of the people. However, incarceration rates, predominantly for offences of sexual or domestic violence or reckless driving, are high, 14 times higher than the non-indigenous rate. Ngaanyatjarra councils have lobbied, with some success, to get more police stationed in their areas to address the problem.

== History of contact ==
Until the establishment of the Warburton Mission in 1934 there had been no external agency established on their lands. Until the 1960s, contact with the outside world had been sparse and relatively benign, with none of the disruption of displacement from their traditional terrain typically suffered by First Nations People generally. The mission sowed the seeds of Christian culture which continues to this day, particularly in the form of charismatic evangelism.

== Native title ==
The Ngaanyatjarra made a claim to native title, and on 29 June 2005 their lands were the subject of the largest native title determination in Australian history, according to Aboriginal and Torres Strait Islander Social Justice Commissioner Tom Calma, when a Federal Court hearing presided by Justice Michael Black ruled on the claim to 187,000 square kilometres (72,000 mi^{2}) in Western Australia.

== People ==
- Tjapartji Kanytjuri Bates (c.1933–2015), artist

== See also ==
- Aboriginal groupings of Western Australia

== Sources ==
- Black, Michael (30 June 2005). "Determination of native title – Ngaanyatjarra lands Mervyn v Western Australia [2005] FCA 831" (PDF). National Native Title Tribunal.
- Brooks, David (2012). "An Emerging Present: A Short History of the Ngaanyatjarra Lands". In Acker, Tim; Carty, John (eds.). Ngaanyatjarra: Art of the Lands. Sussex Academic Press. ISBN 978-1-742-58391-4.
- Brooks, David (2013). "Organization Within Disorder: The Present and Future of Young People in Ngaanyatjarra Lands". In Eickelkamp, Ute (ed.). Growing Up in Central Australia: New Anthropological Studies of Aboriginal Childhood and Adolescence. Berghahn Books. pp. 183–212. ISBN 978-1-782-38127-3.
- "Community information". Shire of Ngaanyatjarraku. n.d.
- Dousset, Laurent (2002). "Politics and demography in a contact situation: the establishment of the Giles Meteorological Station in the Rawlinson Ranges, West Australia". Aboriginal History. 26: 1–22. JSTOR 24046045.
- "Ngaanyatjarra Lands to adopt a single time zone from July 1". Ngaanyatjarra Council Group. 26 June 2024.
- "Frequently Asked Questions: Information Technology Communications" (PDF). Working in the Ngaanyatjarra Lands. Rural Health West. Archived from the original (PDF) on 10 September 2018.
- "Kiwirrkurra Campus". Ngaanyatjarra Lands School. 9 April 2018.
- Kral, Inge (2012). Talk, Text and Technology: Literacy and Social Practice in a Remote Indigenous Community. Multilingual Matters. ISBN 978-1-847-69759-2.
- "Largest ever determination of native title australia". Australian Human Rights Commission. 30 June 2005.
- "Ngaanyatjarra Lands Directory". Shire of Ngaanyatjarraku.
- "Our Shire". Shire of Ngaanyatjarraku. n.d.
- Tindale, Norman Barnett (1974). "Nana (WA)". Aboriginal Tribes of Australia: Their Terrain, Environmental Controls, Distribution, Limits, and Proper Names. Australian National University. ISBN 978-0-708-10741-6. Archived from the original on 20 March 2020.
