= Gladswood House =

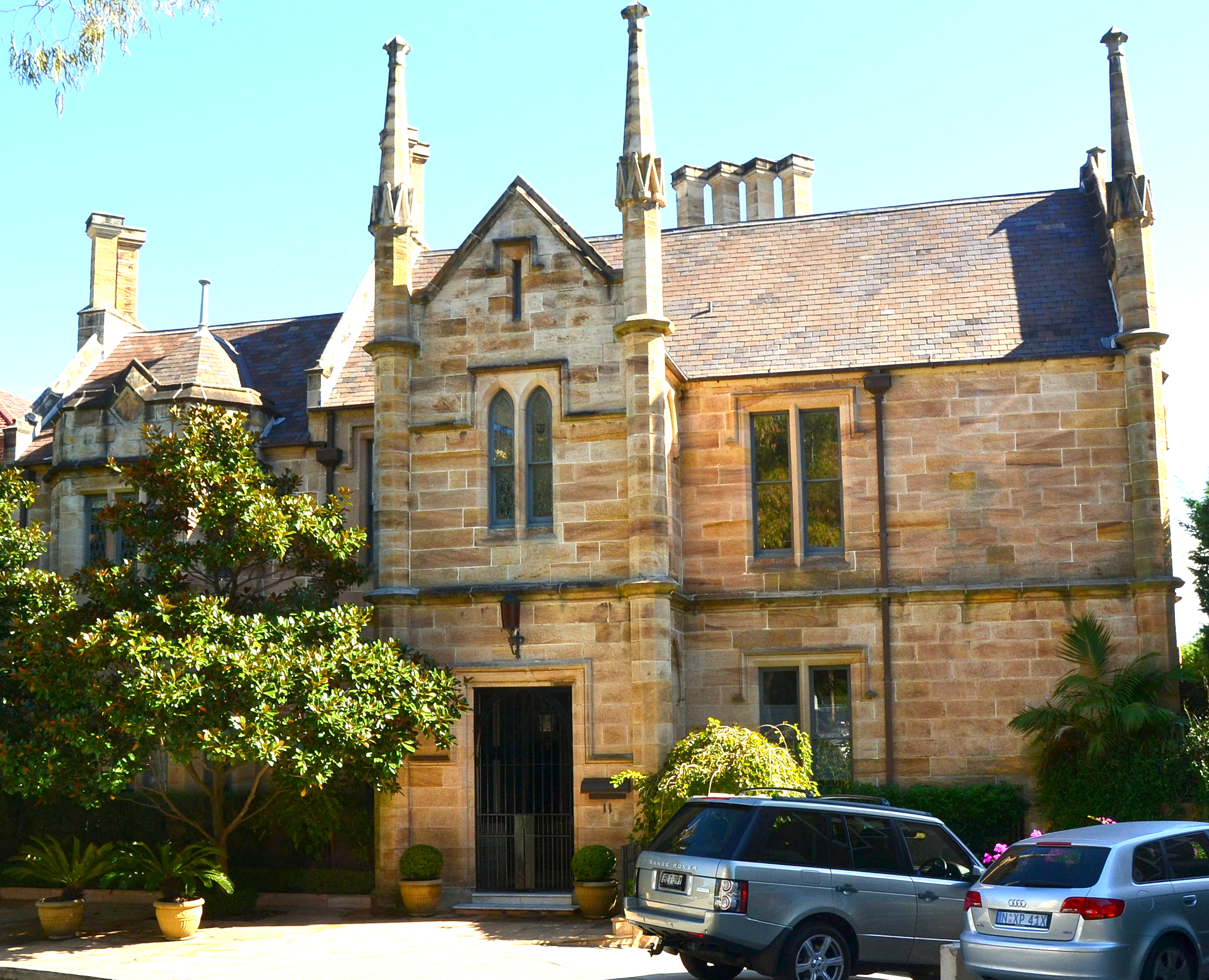
- Gladswood House

- Location within inner Sydney
- 33°52′21″S 151°14′46″E
- Location: 11 Gladswood Gardens, Double Bay, Sydney, New South Wales, Australia

History
- Built: 1862–1864
- Built for: Samuel Deane Gordon

Site notes
- Architects: William Munro; possibly Hilly (attributed)
- Owner: Strata Plan No. 58597

New South Wales Heritage Register
- Official name: Gladswood House; Glenyarrah; Seaford House
- Type: State heritage (built)
- Designated: 2 April 1999
- Reference no.: 496
- Type: House
- Category: Residential buildings (private)

Gladswood House is a two-storey Gothic Revival heritage-listed former multiple occupancy residence and grand house and now apartments located at 11 Gladswood Gardens, Double Bay, Sydney, New South Wales, Australia. It was designed by William Munro and possibly Hilly (attributed) and built from 1862 to 1864. It is also known as Glenyarrah; Seaford House. The property is owned by Strata Plan No. 58597 (Private). It was added to the New South Wales State Heritage Register on 2 April 1999.

== History ==
The house was built between 1862 and 1864. The architect's identity is uncertain, but it was most likely either William Munro or John Frederick Hilly. It was definitely Munro who built the gate pillars as there was an advertisement placed by Munro for stonemasons to build these at this house in 1864.

=== Ownership and occupation, 1826 - 1862 ===
The site of the building originally formed part of the "Point Piper Estate" being a portion of the 77 hectares (190 acres) granted to Captain John Piper by Governor Lachlan Macquarie in 1820. Following Piper's financial difficulties, the holding was purchased in 1826 by the merchant (and former convict) Daniel Cooper of Cooper & Levy. Cooper returned to England in 1831 and on his death the major part of his estate was left to his nephew also a Daniel Cooper of the successful mercantile house of D. Cooper & co.

Although advertising for leasing of subdivision allotments of the "Point Piper Estate" can be found from May 1853, the property probably formed part of the group that was offered in the Sydney Morning Herald on 5 November 1856:

"choice building sites with water frontages to Rose and Double Bays, frontages to the South Head Roads, and situations easy of access; having magnificent views, embracing the ocean, the Harbour and Botany, with the City and Blue Mountains as a background. Roads are now being formed and bridges built over the whole of this delightful estate, and it is impossible to imagine more beautiful situation for villa residences than exist thereon, their distances from the city averaging from one to four miles. Leases will be granted for terms up to 99 years."

By 20 May 1857 the property having a land holding of 1.2 hectares (3 acres) had been leased by Cooper to the merchant Edwin Thomas Beilby for a term of 99 years at A£65 per year. The lease commenced from 1 October 1856 with payment of this agreement was a building covenant that stipulated that the lessee would: "within eight years from the lease lay out and expand exclusive of internal paintings and decoration the sum of A£2,000 in erecting substantial stone or brick buildings" and that within six months on completion of works, verification would be provided to the lessor that such amounts had been expended. This would therefore suggest that as of May 1857 construction of dwellings on the property had not commenced.

Although the Sands Directories records Beilby residing at New South Head Road up to 1861 it is unlikely that this refers to the "Gladswood" property; as on 8 January 1858 Beilby sold the leasehold to the prominent merchant, pastoralist and politician Samuel Deane Gordon MLC for A£800.

The first suggestion of building works may be recorded by an invitation to tender in the Sydney Morning Herald "for building a house at Double Bay" dated 7/4/1860, with documents available at Gordon's Bridge Street office.

Progress of construction may also be followed by tender notices in the Sydney Morning Herald. On 14 November 1860 tenders were called "for the joiners' work". Plans and specifications were available on site with further information from a Mr Munro, Glebe Road or at his Sydney office. By 25 April 1861 tenders were called for painting the "house in the course of erection at Double Bay", tenders referred again to Gordon's Bridge Street office with further information available from Mr Munro, Glebe Street. Carpenters and masons were required again by the 24/4/1862, now recorded for "Mr Gordon's residence, Double Bay". Plans available from Mr Munro, architect, Pitt St, North. By 8 August 1864 it would appear general construction of the residence and perhaps outbuildings were completed for tenders were called for "gate pillars at Glenyarrah, Double Bay", applications to Mr Munro 64 Pitt Street.

It would appear, therefore, that the residence was constructed sometime between November 1860 and substantially completed by April 1862. The residential form of the property was more than likely completed in the final months of 1864, with the dwelling being identified now by name and having its entry identified by "gate pillars". There is also a suggestion in the tender notices that the building included the involvement of an architect by the name of Munro.

We may suggest therefore that Gordon was primarily the driving force in commissioning a purpose designed and built dwelling for himself; financed in large part by the lessor, Sir Daniel Cooper.

The architect referred to in the tender notices was in all probability the little known builder/architect William Munro (1812-1881). Munro is credited with three buildings listed on the Register of the National Estate. Although without formal architectural training it appears his competence was such that he was responsible for a considerable body of ecclesiastical architecture primarily for the Roman Catholic Church. Munro's speciality was the "Gothic style" and all three registered buildings are variations on the Gothic idiom. "Gladswood House" is representative being an interpretation of the "perpendicular or pointed Gothic" applied to a domestic situation. Munro may have sought his design inspiration from pattern books of the day for a close model for "Gladswood" may be found in JC Loudon's An Encyclopaedia of Cottage, Farm and Villa Architecture and Furniture, both in the 1833 and 1850 editions.

Design XX and Design XXI of the 1833 edition are variations of Gothic villa architecture and features in both may be found simplified or interpreted in Munro's design. The plan of the "castellated style" Design XX appears to have been manipulated to suit its Sydney harbour side location. The central axial entry has been relocated to the side and the servant wing detached as in the following Design XXI, however, the plan arrangement of the rooms is a feature found at "Gladswood". Similarly a close comparison may be made with the Gothic verandah treatment located on the side.

Design XXI "a villa in the style of pointed architecture" shares the asymmetrical facade treatment, the central emphasis of the entry, the side ornamental screen fence wall and the detached service wing. The picturesque roofscape of finials, turrets, attached Tudor chimneys and steep roof are also common features that continue in the window mouldings and castellated projecting bay windows. It is not inconceivable that "Gladswood" may have presented a similar simplified garden front with screen wall and attached service building as that indicated in this design.

Although Munro designed prestige villas for some of the prominent citizens of the day it is not known what form or appearance these took. However, that Munro was consistent in his "Gothic" detailing is evidenced in his later design for St. Andrews College at Sydney University where similar elements found at "Gladswood" re-occur.

=== Samuel Deane Gordon ===
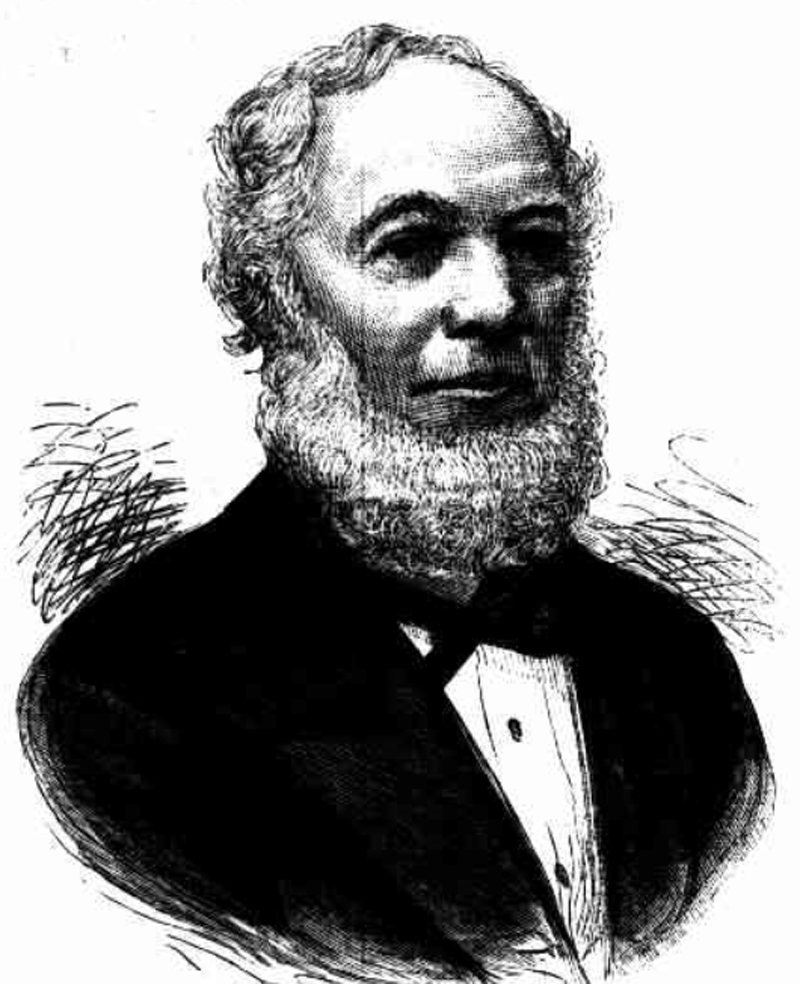
Samuel Deane Gordon

Samuel Deane Gordon (1811-1882) built Gladswood House, then called Glenyarrah in about 1863. Samuel Deane Gordon was born in 1811 at Ballynahinch, County Down, Ireland. His father David Gordon was a farmer. His mother's name was Mary Deane. He came to Sydney in 1830 at the age of 19 and worked in several mercantile houses before becoming a successful merchant. He then turned to pastoral pursuits and leased Banandra run of over 50,000 acres on the Murrumbidgee River. He moved to Sydney and established a wine and spirit business and became the Director of several important companies.

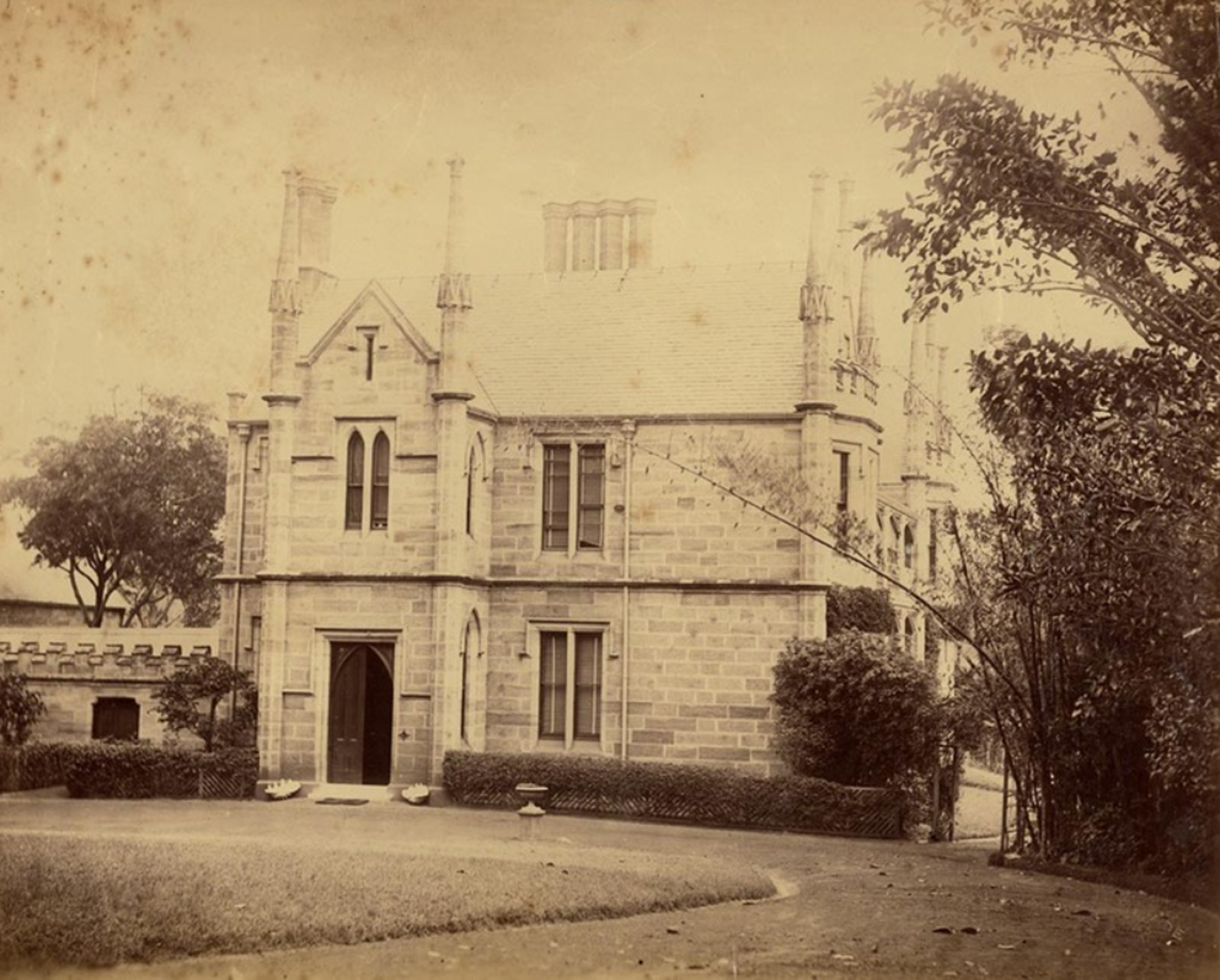
Gladswood House, c. 1870.

In 1839 he married Eliza Dickson in East Maitland and the couple had several children. Unfortunately she died in 1856. He remarried in 1863 in Ireland. His new bride was Emily Fielding, daughter of Joshua Fielding esq. of Belfast.

During the 1860s he acquired more pastoral properties and became very wealthy. He was a prominent Presbyterian became a founder of St Andrew's College, Sydney, and member of its council. He was also a vice-president of the Highland Society and a member of the Victoria Club and the Linnean Society of New South Wales. He joined the committee of the Chamber of Commerce in 1867 and in the 1870s served on the committees of the Benevolent Asylum, the Sydney Infirmary and Dispensary and the Hospital for Sick Children, and was a vice-president of the Young Men's Christian Association and the Horticultural Society of New South Wales.

It is to Gordon's occupation that the first naming of the building Glenyarrah may be attributed. The earliest identification by name being the tender notices of 18 August 1864. G. Nesta Griffiths in her book "Point Piper Past and Present" suggests the name may be a compilation of the Scottish "glen" for valley and the anglicised aboriginal word "yarrah" for gum tree, being "Valley of the Gums". The Woollahra History & Heritage Society date the house to 1856, noting that the design may possibly be attributed to architect J. F. Hilly and note that under Gordon's occupation it was called "Seaford House" and this was changed to "Glenyarrah" during the stay (1883-1913) of Mr T. H. Kelly Snr. and family and later under Mr Spencer Brunton to Gladswood. Gordon may not have been Gladswood's first resident, for an undated Council Rate Assessment entry, possibly no later than 1863, records Gordon as owner with a J. H. Atkinson as "person rated". The rate records of 1863-64 also show both S. D. Gordon and the merchant and member of parliament William Walker as being "rated persons" for Gladswood, with Walker also entered for the adjacent property. G. Nesta Griffiths suggests that Walker took occupation of Gladswood whilst his own house Redleaf" was being constructed on the neighbouring property.

The earliest verifiable illustration of "Gladswood" forms part of the background to a general view of Double Bay in The Illustrated Sydney News of 23 December 1871. A glimpse of the property within its context of Double Bay may be obtained from some general views of the period. An early photograph thought to date from around the 1870s shows the building in what must have been its early appearance at the time of Gordon's occupation. This clearly shows that the present southern wing is a later extension, it also shows the crenulated service wing compound wall with verandah and servant block in the background. An Eric Bayliss photograph of c. 1875 indicates the building's former commanding position on the point between the two bays.

Gordon's occupation continued until his death in 1882 and is recorded in his monogram incorporated in the strained glass window on either side of the entry vestibule and panels that light the main stair. On his death Gordon left Glenyarrah to his daughter Jessie Maria Gordon who in turn sub-let the property to a F. B. Lark from 1883 to 1885. Both Munro and Gordon were associated with the setting up of St. Andrew's College at the University of Sydney, while the latter is commemorated with a fine stained-glass window in St. Andrew's Scots Church in Rose Bay. He died in 1882 and having been predeceased by his second wife he left his fortune to his surviving three daughters. Jessie Maria Gordon inherited Gladswood House but as she had married and lived in England she leased the house to Francis Bothamley Lark for two years and then to Thomas Hussey Kelly who subsequently bought the house.

=== The Kelly family ===
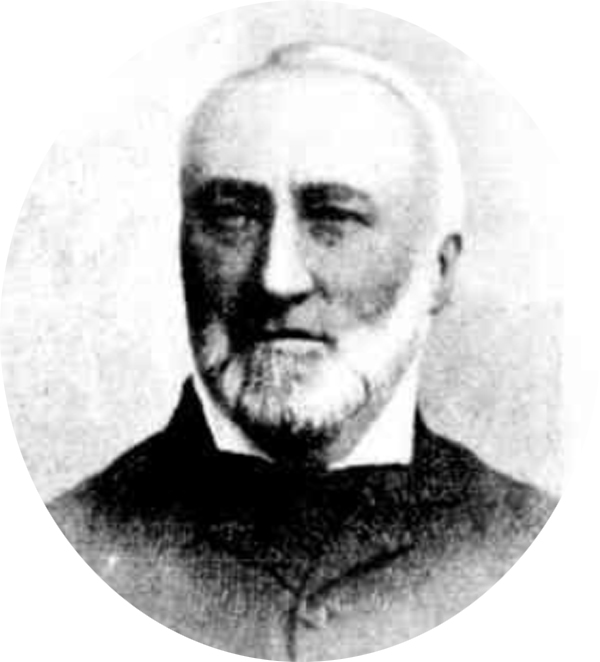
Thomas Hussey Kelly

In 1885 the property was sub-let to Thomas Hussey Kelly (1830-1901) a wool-broker and businessman. Kelly bought the leasehold of Gladswood House in 1887 for A£12,000 and went on to buy the freehold in May 1901, three months before he died. The extent and form of the property at the time of Kelly's occupation may be obtained from a Water Board Plan of 1895.

Kelly was born in 1830 in Ireland. He came to Australia at the age of 30 and found employment as a clerk and later as a wool broker for Gilchrist, Watt & Co. He established his own wool broking firm in 1874 and became very wealthy. He was the Director of numerous companies and by 1901 he was a shareholder in no fewer than twenty gold and copper mining companies. For many years he was managing director of the Sydney Smelting Co.

In 1864 he married Mary Ann Dick and the couple had four sons and two daughters. One of his sons was Frederick Septimus Kelly (1881-1916) who was a gifted musician and whose diary has recently been published. He lived mostly in England and in the diary he refers to his return visit to Gladswood House in 1911 to see his family. He describes his walking the beaches, body surfing at Bondi Beach, visiting on foot and by boat the haunts of his childhood, practicing the piano, playing for guests and making contact with Sydney society as he prepared for his musical debut. Several years later he joined the Royal Naval Division to fight in the War and became a personal friend of Rupert Brooke, the famous English poet. When Rupert died in 1915 he carried his coffin for burial on the Island of Skyros and later composed a musical elegy in Brook's honour. Frederick also was killed in the War a year later and was buried on the Somme.

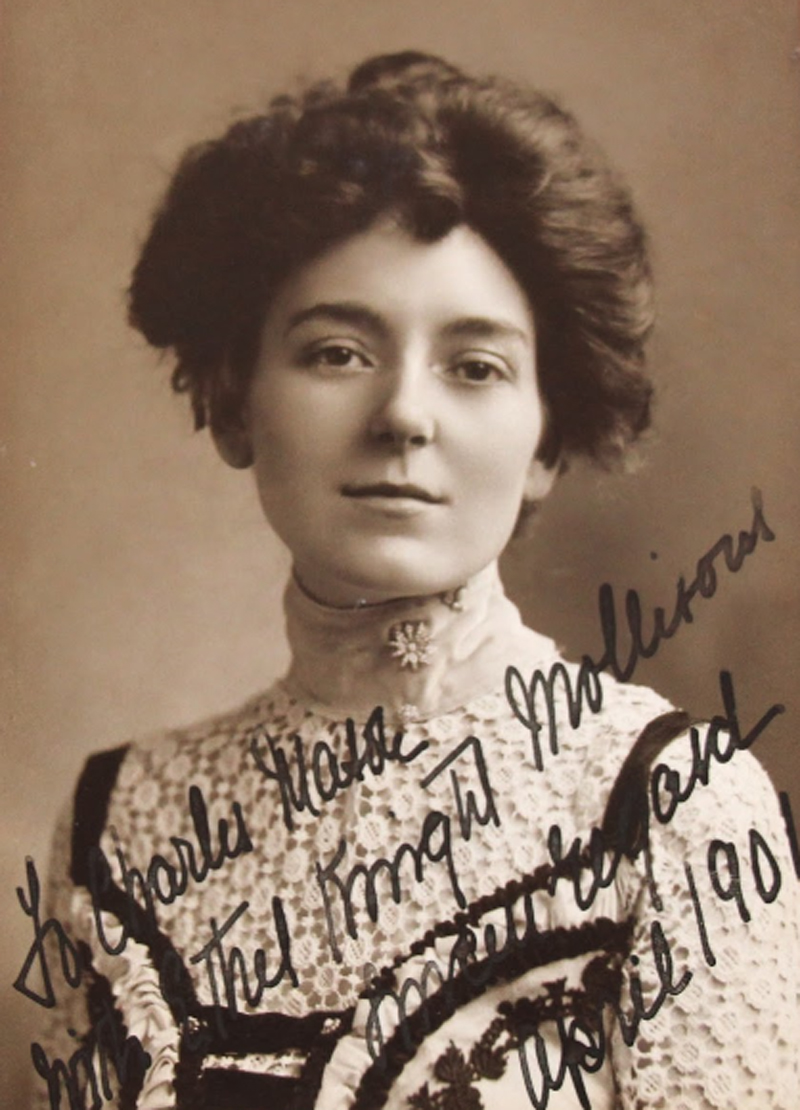
Ethel Knight Mollison, wife of Thomas Herbert Kelly (called Bertie)

Thomas Hussey Kelly died in 1901 and his son Thomas Herbert Kelly (1875-1948) inherited Gladswood House. A view of the property taken around 1900 shows the boat house and pier with the grounds and house in the background. This section of the property was formally incorporated into the title holdings in 1909. Previously it had formed "part of the bed or shores of 'The Port" and was purchased by Kelly from the Government for the sum of A£33 15s.

Auction notices by the agents Raine and Horne, dating 1904 and 1905, for the subdivision of an adjacent property shows "Glenyarrah" and is indicative of the property's identification as a local landmark. That this was clearly the case from the bay is shown in a photograph dating from the final years of Kelly's occupation.

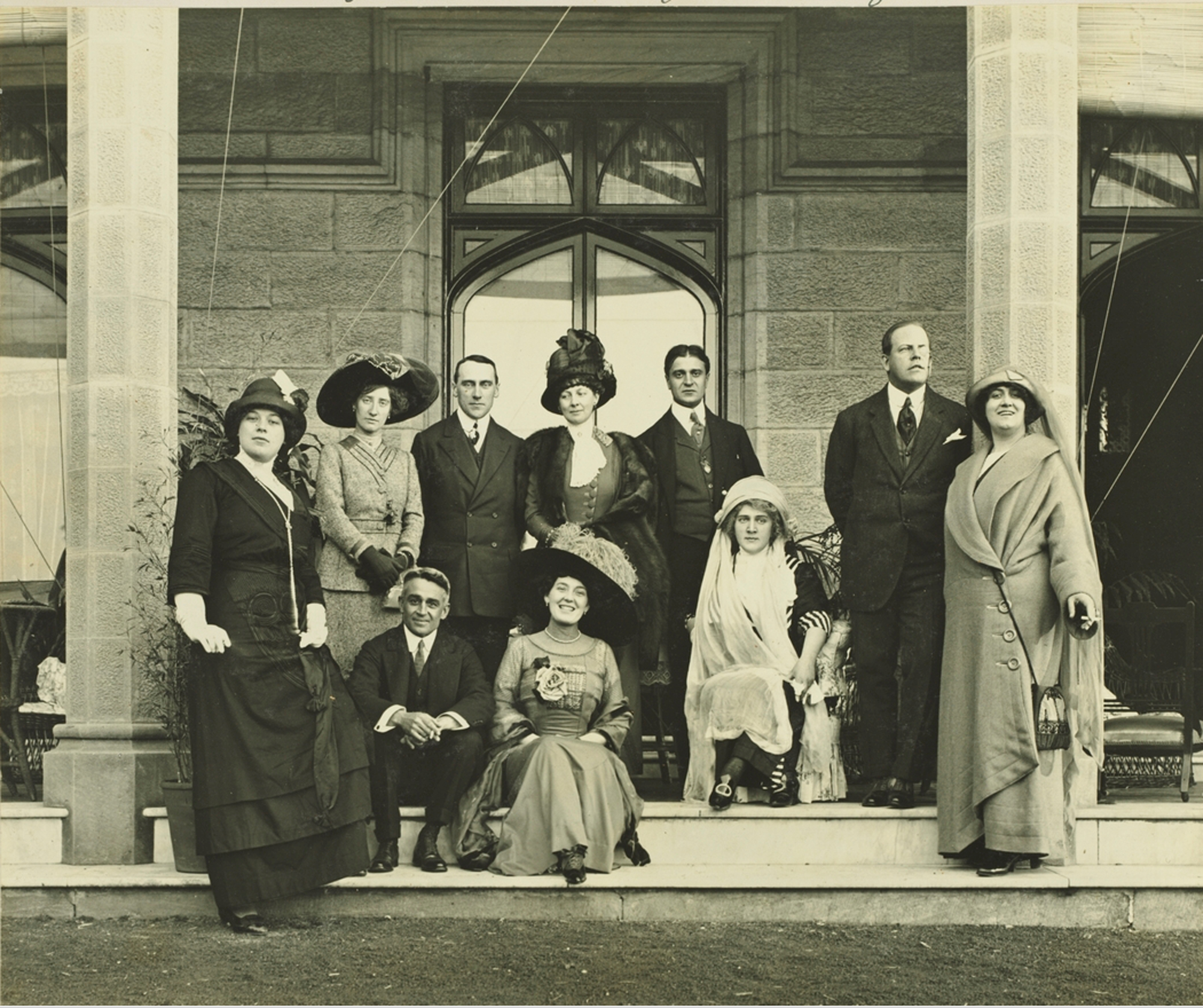
House Party at Gladswood House in 1911. Ethel is seated in the centre and Bertie is third from the left.

Thomas (called Bertie) was born in 1875 in Sydney. He was educated at Eton in England and returned to Australia in 1898. When his father died he became director of the family firm the Sydney Smelting Company. In 1903 he married Ethel Knight Mollison (1875-1949). Ethel was a Canadian born actress who had been invited by the theatre company J. C. Williamson to perform on the stage. She met Bertie while she was here and married him in Melbourne. The couple lived at Gladswood House from 1903 until 1913 and during that time they had many house parties. A newspaper of 1908 carried the following description of their social activities. “At her charming house at Double Bay, Mrs. Kelly's artistic taste is displayed in the arrangement of her home, and beautiful things abound everywhere. Both she and her husband are art lovers, being devoted to music and painting, Mr. Kelly being one of our best amateur violinists.”

Being lovers of music they frequently invited opera singers to their home. In 1911 this house party was photographed by Arthur Wigram Allen, a notable amateur Sydney photographer and is shown on the left. The opera stars are Maria Ranzenberg (far left), Signor Zeni (fourth from right) Madame Wayda (third from right) and the most famous star Eleonora de Cisneros (far right). Ethel is seated in the centre and Bertie is third from the left.

In 1913 the Kellys sold Gladswood House to John Spencer Brunton.

=== John Spencer Brunton ===
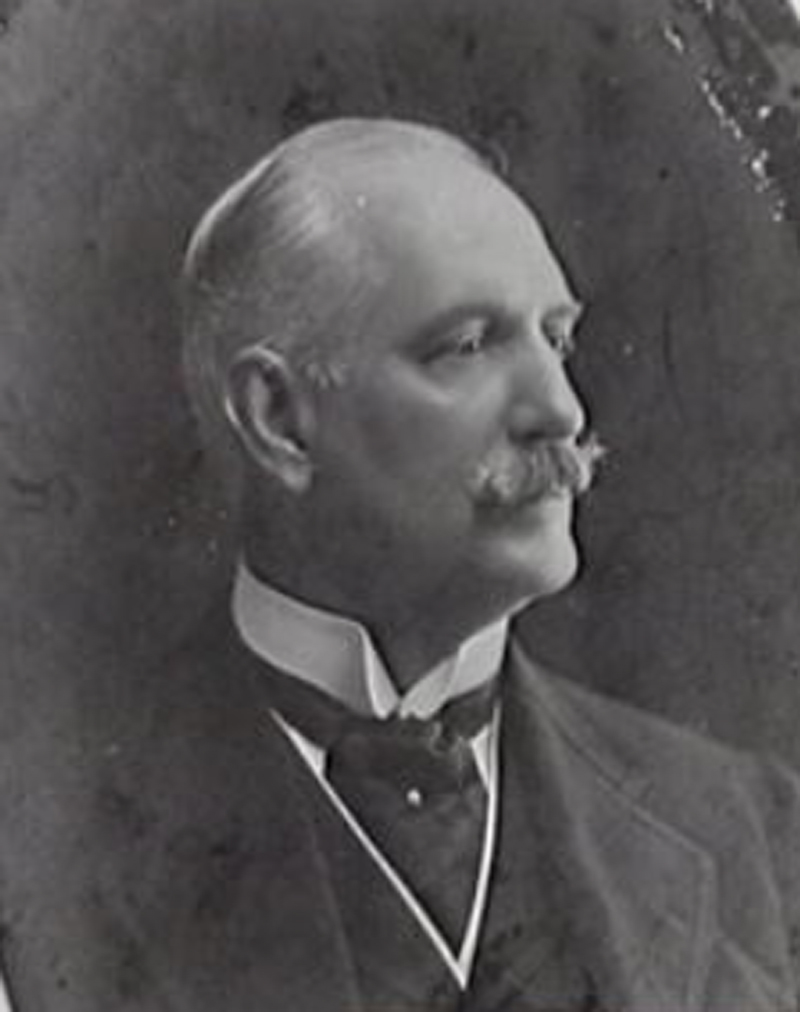
John Spencer Brunton

Kelly sold the property in 1913 to John Spencer Brunton (1861-1937). Brunton (1861-1937) was born in 1861 in Melbourne. His father was Thomas Brunton who had foundered the prominent firm Australian Flour Mills. John was educated at Scotch College, Melbourne and then entered his father's business. In 1887 his father opened a branch of his company at Granville near Sydney and John eventually became a senior partner. He was a member of the Sydney Chamber of Commerce and in 1900 became the President. He was a racehorse owner, yachtsman and golfer. In 1886, he built Brunyarra at Strathfield which still exists today. John Brunton's first wife died in 1890 and he remarried in 1898 to Eleanor Thorne. She was known for her charitable works and was the first honorary treasurer of the New South Wales division of the Red Cross Society and a life-governor of the Royal Alexandra Hospital for Children, Camperdown.

The transfer of ownership to Brunton is recorded on 29 December 1913 and it would appear that he lost no time altering the building to suit his needs. An article on the house on completion of renovations suggests that the dwelling was in some state of disrepair, and may have been the stimulus for Brunton's sweeping alterations. When Brunton bought Gladswood House in 1913 he commissioned the prominent architect Howard Joseland to make additions to the house. Joseland's commission dates from the time he was in partnership with Hugh Vernon in the practice of Joseland and Vernon. However, it appears the work was principally carried out by Joseland alone continuing into his period as a sole practitioner between 1914 and 1919. Joseland's daughter later married one of Brunton's sons and the reception was held at Gladswood House. This was widely reported in the newspapers of the time. Brunton died in 1937 and the property was sold to Rose Bay builder Frederick Louis Perini who modified the building to become a guest house. In the 1990s it was converted to luxury apartments.

The extension and extensive refurbishment does not have much in common with Joseland's general design work, which favoured the "Queen Anne Style". He was an advocate for the development of an "Australian Style" and was critical of over ornamentation, his own house being testament to his pursuit of such interests. Typical of his work are such building as Sargood Hall in Ivanhoe, originally buildings for the Burnside Presbyterian Homes for Children at North Parramatta, or the Nicholson residence at Wahroonga of 1900. Joseland was not unfamiliar, however, with a brief that required the incorporation of design elements taken from an existing building into new works as is evidence in his extension for the retailer F Lassetter & Co. in 1899. Here an existing facade was extended and internal design elements from the original building repeated in new works.

The atypical nature of the Gladswood refurbishment in Joseland oeuvre is perhaps a response to his client, Brunton's requirement for a building consistent with pretensions to the landed gentry of Brunton's ancestral Scotland. This, coupled with a personal interest in his client through his daughter's later marriage to Brunton's son, may have made him more amicable to compromising his own strongly held beliefs for architecture. Elements of Joseland's preference for simple and unadorned line may be found in the less public spaces where one finds the simpler fire surrounds in white painted timber a favoured motif as that found in Joseland's designs for the furniture manufacturer Norton and Reed. Similar consistent detailing to Joseland's general work is witnessed in the external treatment of the southern wing and extension of the stairwell which are clad in timber shingle. Such external treatment is consistent with his preference for Queen Anne and may be found in his work on the Berry Estate or the Neutral Bay Land Company estate.

Council records indicate that a permit for the Gladswood building alterations were approved on 24 November 1913 being for works valuing A£3,800. The extension on the south of the front facade dates from this period and much of the internal refurbishment and joinery fittings within the original fabric may be attributed to Joseland.

It is to Brunton that the change of the name of the property took place from Glenyarrah to Gladswood. The name refers to "Gladswood House", a small "seat" in Gladswood, Berwickshire County, Scotland; the area to which the Brunton family took their origins. The name Gladswood may still be seen below that of its former owner carved into the stone flaggings under the door mat of the front entry. The extent of Brunton's changes to the building were considerable these included the construction of a southern wing providing a formal dining room and ballroom as well as refurbishment of most of the ground and first floor areas. The works may also have included the construction of a garage but available information cannot establish its location.

The building as it now stands is in effect a legacy of these alteration works undertaken by Brunton and architect Howard Joseland. The Woollahra History & Heritage Society attribute the extensions to architect G. Flen Gilling, noting they included a fireplace and oak panelling from 14th century England.

Brunton continued to own the property until 1927 at which time he sold the entire holding to the estate agents, Edward Harold Maas and Henry Rickards Maas for the sum of A£45,000. It appears that Maas had some difficulty getting subdivision plans approved by Council, numerous disputes arising, primarily with regard to the extent and costs of road works. Brunton continued to occupy Gladswood whilst the property was subdivided into fourteen allotments with Gladswood being Lot 6. The subdivision auction notice of 24 September 1927 indicates that the land holding for Gladswood was limited more or less to its building line whilst retaining a portion of land that formed its northern aspect over Double Bay.

At the end of the "hook like" street of Gladswood Gardens and at the rear of no. 21 can be seen, behind the multi-car garage, the stable and coach house for the original Seaford House (/Glenyarrah/Gladswood). Brunton purchased the dwelling back from Maas in 1928 and the rate records of this year indicate for the first time Gladswood Gardens as a locality with "Gladswood House" as being No. 11-13 Gladswood Gardens. In 1935 he also purchased back Lot 5 which has access to the pier. Brunton continued to occupy the house until his death in 1937.

=== 1937 - 1988 ===
Following Brunton's death the property was transferred to his sons John Moffitt Brunton and Thomas Gladswood Brunton who in turn sold it to the Rose Bay builder Frederick Louis Perini, the transfer recorded in February 1939. Photographs dating c.1939 indicate that the dwelling still retained its northerly aspect over the bay.

Perini commissioned the architect JA Dobson to convert the residence and provide a substantial western addition for "multiple occupancy" use; Council approved plans for these works date from February 1938. The limited material available suggests that this may have been a major and sizeable contract for Dobson whose background was principally involved in civil engineering works. Following his commencement in practice in Australia in 1921, he appears to have been involved in domestic work of a modest nature.

In 1939 Perini leased the building for a period of twelve years to Gwendoline Jean von Tiedemann, who operated the building as a "Guest House'. In 1951 the property was sold to a company trading as "Gladswood Freehold" who leased the building for a "Guest House" to Ray William Stafford and Hannah Maria Stafford. The building changed ownership a number of times but largely remained as a "Guest House/Private Hotel" until 1988. c. 1990, Ian Joye's Coronet Investments develop a "European-inspired" block of three three bedroom, two-level apartments behind (west of) Gladswood House. The building has been recently been tastefully restored.

== Description ==
Constructed of sandstone, it features two wings, a verandah with three bays, a slate roof, Tudor chimneys and a fireplace that is thought to go back to 14th century England. Further extensions and alterations were carried out after 1901. "Gladswood House" represents one of the examples of picturesque Gothic that was a favoured style of "romantic embellishment" to the Sydney foreshore dating back to the earliest colonial period. Immediate examples within the area include Lindesay and Carthona at Darling Point. Both dwellings represent the colonial approach of simplified "Regency" and "Tudor" Gothic and are at variance with Gladswood with its more picturesque "perpendicular" effects. The simplified nature of the earlier Lindesay and Carthona are perhaps reflections on the economic situation of the earlier period that may have prevented the extent of detailing found in "Gladswood" or the later still "castellated Gothic" of Swifts also at Darling Point. Interestingly, both Lindesay and Carthona are cited as being derived from Loudon's pattern book. Where the reference to Loudon's model at Lindesay is somewhat less obvious, Carthona and Gladswood House are closer to the designs in the pattern book. Unlike Lindesay and Carthona, Gladswood has lost its close relationship of the original building to a harbour view, a fundamental feature in the prescriptive siting of Loudon.

=== Grounds ===
The original land holding was little over 1.2 hectares (3 acres) subdivided in 1927 into fourteen blocks and establishing its existing holding in 1938. The original entrance to the property was from New South Head Road through stone gate pillars possibly constructed late 1864. On entry to the property immediately to the north was stone Lodge with attached verandah, the date of its demolition is now known.

The entrance to the grounds was directed on the west by a stone retaining wall, the drive followed the eastern boundary before being redirected by another wall to the house proper. Steps near the north-eastern boundary before being redirected by another wall to the house proper. Steps near the north-eastern corner of the building carried one down to the "Fernery" as well as the stone pier and timber boat house. These as well as the stone walls that fronted the bay may be seen in the Eric Bayliss photograph taken around 1875 (frontispiece) . Sections of the retaining walls and stone pier are still extant, primarily on the neighbouring northern property.

It is believed that by the time of Brunton's occupation the Fernery was demolished and may have been replaced by a swimming pool and tennis court.

The drive on reaching the house arced back as a return as well as continuing past the house that led to the stables and servant wing. The stables were located at the south-western corner of the site and consisted of a single storey stone building running east–west along the southern boundary. Immediately adjacent orientated north–south was a wooden structure possible the stables proper, this was framed by a retaining wall. The stone building still stands and serves as the residence for 21 Gladswood Gardens.

Nothing remains of the original landscaped grounds of Gladswood.

=== Servant and service wing ===
To the south of the house was a collection of structures that probably formed the original servant and service quarters. Grouped around a well and enclosed within a compound by a crenellated stone wall, its entrance was from the south.

The main building of this complex was a single storey stone structure. This probably conformed to the usual arrangement of Kitchen, Laundry and Pantry below with bedroom accommodation over. This building was connected to the residence by a covered verandah.

Following the renovations of 1913 it is possible that the well may have been filled or covered as the construction of the Dining/Ballroom would have been in close proximity to its perimeter.

These works would also have necessitated the demolition of part of the enclosing wall and an attached timber structure that may have housed the pantries of the main house and have been the point of entry to the basement. The connecting Verandah may have been demolished and replaced by a covered Courtyard which would have connected the servant wing to the main residence.

=== Main residence ===
The main building originally was a two-storey stone structure of two wings framing a three bayed verandah. Its original external appearance remains largely intact. The southern perimeter of the main building originally stopped along the line of the wall immediately adjacent to the southern window of the entrance hall. The toothing of the stonework for the dining Room/Ballroom extension is clearly visible on the front facade.

=== Entry vestibule ===
Within the entry vestibule under the door mat may be found evidence of J. S. Brunton's occupation; for the name Brunton with Gladswood under are carved into the sandstone flaggings of the floor.

The entry vestibule also contains two stained glass windows the two top lights of which contain depictions of Flora and Pamona; the Roman gods of flowering or blossoming plants. These probably date from around 1875 and were made by the firm of Lyon, Cottier & Co of Sydney, the leading exponents of stained glass in Australia of their time. Lyon & Cottier commenced trading in 1873, hence the stained glass works are a later addition to the house possibly dating from the time of Gordon's involvement in construction of St. Andrew's College which contains much of their work.

The panels show the influences of Pre-Raphaelitism and the design was also used in the depiction of the seasons, but here used in the common motif of wealth and abundance. Although appropriate symbols of the day for an entrance, they may also have had additional significance for Gordon in his involvement with the Horticultural and Agricultural Societies of NSW. The bottom sash of these windows also contain Gordon's monogram and motto "in deo fiducia est mia", (In God is my trust) surrounded my motifs depicting Australian flora and fauna. The panels are fine examples of Lyon & Cottier's works and should be preserved.

The suspended lantern light fitting dates from the 1913 renovation works.

Above the main entry door the stone lintel carries a date in Roman numerals of 1857. This has often been assumed to indicate the date of construction of the building, although this cannot be ruled out entirely it more likely refers back to the date of the original lease when terms for the construction of the dwelling were agreed. The front door although conforming in outline to the original is of recent construction. The original door appears to have been panelled. The area in front of the building was originally paved in a hexagonal paving block, with planter beds in front of the walls.

The existing entrance hall has been extended in width as part of the renovations undertaken by Brunton. Formerly a passage with an adjoining room that may have served as pantry/storage space it also had access to the servant/service wing complex. It contains some of the principal features of the house, its plastered relief ceilings, oak dado wall panelling and large ornate carved timber fireplace, all date from the 1913 renovations. The plaster ornamental panels framed between solid timber beams are of excellent quality and are in good condition. The existing solid timber doors with their deeply moulded architraves also date from the Brunton renovations and are in contrast to the more simple Victorian trims on the First Floor some of which may be original.

The fireplace has previously been believed to have been imported from England and amongst its ornamentation may be found a 1399 carved its apex has also been an item of speculative interest. The date of 1399 is believed to refer to the date to which the Brunton family traced their origins; (refer notes on Study) the armorial shield below is the heraldic device of the Scottish line of the Brunton family. The timber fire surround was designed by the architect Howard Joseland who was well known for his timber joinery detailing. The house is also reported to contain oak panelling from 14th century England.

Although these features do not form part of the original 19th century fabric the quality of the joinery, timber and plaster work are excellent. The existing suspended lantern light fitting was also designed by Joseland and should if possible be incorporated or adapted into any proposed works. Joseland was also responsible for the design of most of the furniture that once decorated the principal rooms of the Ground Floor.

=== Cellar ===
The southern extension of the Entry Hall is evidenced in the cellar space below the entrance hall area. Its dimensions conform to the line of the original 19th century wall configuration and the base structure of the western return wall is still to be seen.

The position of an access point to the cellar space immediately adjacent to the entrance door is unusual and may have been that this area was formerly a service room or pantry space. With the construction of the Dining/Ballroom the cellar was now deprived of its former external access and the retention of this opening may have proved convenient in providing a wood store for the hall fireplace. The position of the door and service opening which provided access from the servant/service wing may still be found within the southern wall of the cellar. The contention that the ornate fireplace found in the ground floor entrance hall was not part of the original fabric is verified by the reinforced concrete support base for the hearth.

=== Dining room/ballroom ===
The dining room/ballroom forms the Ground Floor area of a wing that was added at the time of Brunton's renovation and all the finishes including the fireplace were designed by Howard Joseland. The entire room is largely in its original state apart from the intrusion of a bathroom in the south-west corner, this dates from a later time than the 1938 conversion of the building into a Guest House and may have been during the upgrading of facilities for its use as a private hotel with self-contained facilities. Formerly this corner contained an access door in the southern wall which led to the service wing, perhaps following the demolition of the service complex this external door was relocated to the western wall which led out to a covered verandah area.

The ornamental panel ceiling and timber beams are substantially in good condition apart from some damage particularly along the southern wall and water penetration damage near the eastern by window. The carved timber bosses formerly held frosted bulbs that provided the main lighting for the room. These fittings have been removed and fluorescent fittings fitted to the ceiling beams.

The room contains a large ornamental carved timber fireplace of high craftsmanship. On the eastern wall a recess houses an oak sideboard with lead light windows over. Within the four window panels are stained glass emblems, two of which contain the arms of Victoria and NSW, no doubt indicative of the Brunton family business associations. The impact of these windows has been diminished by the addition of a geometric pattern in leadlight found in the eastern glazing as well as the bay window of the first floor room above. The timber floor is mitred at the corners indicating the rooms alternate use as a Ballroom space.

As the room is substantially intact, the detailing should be retained. This may be facilitated by the removal of the bathroom addition and the reintroduction of access from the former door in the south west corner. Introduction of more natural light behind the sideboard alcove would greatly enhance the lighting of the space and appearance of the leadlighting details and should be encouraged.

=== Main stair ===
Although the main stair from Ground to First Floor may be original it may also have been a new stair installed as part of the 1913 renovatio,. The residence apparently was in some state of disrepair by the time of Brunton's purchase and the replacement of the stair may have been a requirement.

Certainly the stair that continues from the First Floor to the attic and roof space was not part of the original fabric and probably was not included in the renovations. The continuation of the stair width to a secondary service space and the visual cutting of the stained glass window is uncharacteristic of the earlier period. However, the consistency of detailing between this and the lower stair does not preclude its inclusion in Brunton's renovations. It may have come about due to the requirement for accommodation of the servant facilities within the dwelling. The placement of an electrical bell board at the top of the stairs support such a contention, as does the dormer window on the northern section of the roof which does not appear on the photograph of the property dating c. 1913. The original roofline over the stairwell has been raised as evidenced by the external timber shingle lining and confirms that the present stair configuration may not be original.

The stained glass window of the stairwell again is by Lyon & Cottier and contains some fine figure and geometric detailing. Gordon's monogram and heraldic motif are also to be found within the glass detailing. Dating from c. 1875 they should retained.

=== Cloak room ===
This room and its corresponding room on the First Floor is an extension to the building dating from the 1913 renovations. Originally this may have been the location for the toilet and bathing facilities for the main household. The Water Board Plan indicates that there may have been a covered structure in this location but does not indicate material of construction. Certainly it was conveniently positioned for service access from the servant block courtyard.

It appears to have been fitted out as a Cloak Room and toilet facility accessible from the main hallway as well as having connecting access to the Dining/Ballroom via a covered verandah. The floor and wall tiles with their ornamental wall and floor border treatment have a certain charm. However, the tiling is generally in a bad state of repair and is not of particular significance. The full length marble shelf, however, should be retained for adaptation in future works.

=== Managers flat/verandah/access to dining room via western door ===
Originally this was external to the building, following the 1913 dining room addition a covered verandah served as access from this room to the cloak room/bathroom. The imprint of the verandah is still apparent as the passage behind the main stair servicing the "Managers Flat". This brick and concrete roof extension dates from around 1939 and is deemed to be of no significance.

=== Boudoir ===
All the internal work within this room dates from the 1913 renovations. It would appear that the decoration of this room and the second drawing room were influenced by Brunton's wife Eleanor working in conjunction with Howard Joseland. This room as with G11 is at odds with the more public rooms of the dwelling and its joinery is more closely aligned to that of common features of the Federation period.

The fittings within the room have been modified to some degree. The window seat on the east has been removed, as has a cupboard on the western side of the fireplace that followed the detailing of the window seat, now replaced with a cupboard of recent construction. The white painted Federation style timber work appears to have been part of the original scheme and the timber architraves are consistent with Federation detailing. It is unlikely that the general aspect of the room can be restored, considering the self-contained nature of the room with harbour views has been lost. It may be possible to retain portions of this work although this retention would only be of nostalgic value.

With the construction of the eastern extension and replacement of the western window with a door opening, the function of the room has been substantially altered. Formerly a private room with an external view to the west; it has since 1939 served as a transit space being an extension of the main passage connecting the original residence to the western extension.

=== Drawing room ===
The internal appearance of the front drawing room is a product of the 1913 renovation, however, it has been subdivided into two spaces with the installation of a partition wall that stops short of the ceiling. A bathroom has been installed in the north-west corner. The partition has been installed post 1938 as the room is shown on the Perini drawings in its original plan form. The partitions and bathroom installations are considered to be intrusive elements.

The ceiling contains a pattern carried out in timber that continues down the walls at the corners of the room. Although the timber work may have been by Joseland its variance in style with the other public rooms suggests that it may be a later renovation, perhaps at its conversion into a Billiard Room as indicated on the Dobson drawings of 1938. The timber picture rail frieze continues across the partition wall and suggests that the room has undergone numerous renovation over time.

The fireplace with its framed mirror over is Victorian in character and differs from the others in the public rooms of the Ground Floor. The fireplace as those in G11, F4 and F11 may be original, further investigation would be required not as ornamented or worked as others within the house. The mirror over appears to have been a later addition, perhaps dating from the Brunton renovations. It is unlikely that his was the original location of the fireplace as there is no chimney or flue over the services this facility. It is likely that a fireplace was positioned on the western wall back-to-back with the study fireplace but this cannot be accurately ascertained from a visual inspection.

The cornices are not consistent with the other Ground Floor rooms and may predate the Joseland renovations, however, given the extent of area (i.e. ceiling and walls) treated with the timber panelling the cornices may have been included when this work was done. A door connects this room to the Study, its architraves are deeply moulded and are fine examples of joiners works dating from the Joseland renovations.

=== Study ===
The fit-out of the study is also a product of the Brunton renovations. The timber dado wall panelling each contain a circular embossed copper detail. These are believed to be depictions of "the three link cable which was invented by an ancestor" of J. S. Brunton, a General Brunton in 1399. This date is repeated on the hall fireplace and reinforce Brunton's concern for a personal iconography that reinforced his family ancestry.

The timber fireplace is another example of Joseland's hand. It contains a carved heraldic device with a Latin inscription below, that reads Pax Mentis Incendium Gloriae, this may have been transcribed in error for the motto of another arm of the Brunton family reads Fax Mentis Incendium Gloriae, meaning "the torch of glory inflames the mind". The ceiling repeats the exposed timber beam motif that characterises the other main rooms.

=== Verandah vestibule ===
The verandah vestibule/passage contains a pressed metal ceiling in good condition. This post-dates the original construction but together with the cornices and perhaps rose, may have formed part of the 1913 renovations. The suspended light fitting is from this period. The door openings that led to the study and drawing room have been filled as cupboard space. Both sets of doors that lead from the main hall and onto the verandah are fine examples of joiners work.

The verandah doors are in all likelihood original in form; however, the main passage sets of doors may have been a Joseland invention, as they are not consistent in their Gothic detailing. The walls have been papered to picture rail height, the awkward manner in which the picture rail meets the door architraves suggests that these date from a later refurbishment than the 1913 works.

=== Drawing room (west) ===
The drawing room like the boudoir has also been greatly affected by the western extension. Here again with the removal of the western window and replacement with a door opening providing access to the 1938 extension the self-contained nature of the room has been lost. This is further compromised by the loss of view to the north resulting from the subdivision and to the west by the construction of the 1938 extension. The fit-out of the room again by Joseland is in high contract to the other main rooms at the front of the building and continues the theme established in the boudoir. The room has been painted and wall papered in recent times. The appearance of the room following Joseland's renovations may be found in a photograph taken in the 1920s and indicates the importance of the western window to the room. On the eastern wall is an early Victorian white Carrara marble surround and cast iron fireplace with marble hearth which may date from the original building and are worthy of retention.

Joseland's design for the room is in contrast to the other main rooms. Although the wall panelling and architraves are a common motif, the panelling and plaster ceiling details appear as a filigree beading and is not of significance other than as a part of the composite 1913 renovations. Recommendations for its on-going treatment are similar to those of the Boudoir.

=== Northern verandah ===
The northern verandah is substantially in its original 1862 form with its stone pillars and timber Gothic arches. The tessellated floor tiles are generally in good condition and were installed as part of the Joseland works. The end walls have been disfigured by the installation of the service pipes for the bathrooms installed on the first floor of the verandah. The lantern light fittings were designed by Joseland, and the marble steps probably dates from his renovation works.

The aspect from the ground floor verandah has been irreparably affected by the subdivision of the property. The former orientation of the building to a northern view no longer has any relationship to the bay which was intrinsic to its planning. The placement of bathrooms on the first floor verandah are unsightly and intrusive additions to the external fabric. Considering this is now the only vantage point from which a view may be obtained and the only visible section from the bay these additions should be removed. The Gothic detailed balustrading is still intact to two bays with the end bay filled by unsympathetic timber lining boards and glazed partition. The missing balustrading should be reinstated and the verandah bathrooms removed. This would have a consequent result in the removal of the unsightly pipework that now covers the face of the end walls.

=== Western extension ===
The western extension dates from 1938 and was carried out by the builder/developer F. L. Perini following his purchase of the property. The architect responsible for the documentation was J. A. Dobson and Bondi Junction.

The extension, is constructed on original stonework that may have been reused following the demolition of the service wing. In its design a simplistic attempt was made to be sympathetic to the original building. However, its "modern" interpretation of castellated Gothic is at odds with the picturesque perpendicular Gothic of the original building. This may be evidenced in the removal of the original western stone turret and replacement with one of varying style in brick and render. Although the lined ashlar treatment of the external concrete render and the window mouldings present on the northern facade are attempts to reflect the visual appearance of the original building the superficial nature of the copy is reflected in the flatness, lack of texture and obvious difference in material lacks the richness of the original.

The western extension resulted also in the removal of windows to the original facade that provided a harbour view and altered the planning and circulation pattern of the original residence. The scale of the building relative to the original house, the changes it necessitated to the original 1860s north facade and the poor consideration of the connection between it and the original building all diminish its overall value. Its role as hotel accommodation led to the programmatic use of details throughout the wing that are not commensurate with the craftsmanship of the original building and some of the subsequent Brunton renovations. The provision of the metal framed verandah's in the 1980s assist to reduce the scale of the western facade, however, their detailing and construction are unsympathetic additions. Hence it is deemed that the western extension is of little significance and may be removed or provide the opportunity of adaption to retain the fabric of the original building.

It should, however, be borne in mind that the construction of this extension has been the primary reason for the preservation of the original structure and intactness of the interior fittings. Although the demolition of this extension would greatly enhance the building and go towards returning the building to its "original" outline, the viability for the preservation of the original building may be greatly compromised in so doing.

=== First floor ===
The First Floor area has been greatly altered over time, such changes include:

- 1913 additions in the construction of the bedroom and service wing on the south-east, and the construction of a bathroom west of the main stairwell.
- 1913 refurbishment of internal finishes including plaster trims, joinery and fireplace surrounds.
- post 1927(?) installation of attic stair and service block
- 1938 subdivision of rooms for guest house accommodation and provision of bathrooms
- 1938 construction of western wing, removal of original western windows and provision of openings to service new addition.
- post 1938 subdivision of areas in provision of bathrooms during its time as a private hotel.

As such little of the internal aspect of the First Floor can be attributed as being original.

Rooms F6-F8 dating from 1913 may have been used as staff facilities as the 1938 Perini drawings indicate that there may have been an external door on the southern wall. This area has been further subdivided through partitions with the bathrooms showing subsequent refurbishment.

The spatial arrangement of the First Floor has been substantially altered; the main stair originally stopped at this level and has been extended c.1927. The double doors that terminate the eastern axis of the Hall are late additions following the 1938 conversion for Hotel accommodation.

It appears that most of the internal finishes are either a product of the 1913 or post 1938 renovation works. Cornicing in Rooms F3 and F16 with their deeply moulded and fluted surfaces are in contrast to the much simpler forms in the other rooms that match those in the Hall. This cornicing carries around the bathroom walls which were installed c. 1938, and may be copies. The fireplace surrounds in Rooms F6, F11 and F16 are Federation in details and appear to be 1913 replacement echoing Joseland's work in the Ground Floor Boudoir.

Most of the fittings in the Bathroom (F14) have been removed and the installation of the now damaged "column enclosed" pan confirms that the internal fitout dates from around 1913. The room is in a bad state of repair, with significant water damage to ceilings and walls.

The western extension has resulted in the removal of windows and replacement with openings or the bricking up of former windows. This is the case for the western wall of the Hall and that of Room F16 where the outline of the former window and window blocks are still visible.

The outlook from the main bedrooms have been disfigured by the installation of a bathroom and enclosure of part of the verandah. These probably date from around the 1950s and their removal would facilitate the renewal of the buildings relationship with the Bay.

All the rooms are in some state of disrepair with various degrees of water penetration and damage to the ceilings. Efforts should be made as a matter of priority to ensure the watertightness of the roof to avoid further deterioration of the building.

=== Attic/roof space ===
The roof space attic was probably converted into accommodation following the subdivision of the property in 1927 which may have resulted in the requirement for additional accommodation within the main building. The dormer window on the north does not appear on any of the early photographs, the latest around 1913. A measured drawing dated April 1980 indicate that there were supplementary divisions of the space into bedrooms.

The walls and ceiling were formerly lined in lathe and plaster and the nails that remain are of recent 20th century origin. Some of the stone walls that divided the roof space have been demolished in recent times together with the continuation of chimneys from the Ground Floor. These should be rebuilt to enable lower level fireplaces to continue to operate.

=== Modifications and dates ===
See description for several modifications, including:

- Original 19th century land holding was little over 1.2 hectares (3 acres)
- 1913+ – extensive alterations
- 1927 – property subdivided into 14 allotments with "Gladswood" being Lot 6. The holding for "Gladswood" was limited more or less to its building line whilst retaining a portion of land that formed its northern aspect over Double Bay. This may have been when the stable/ coach house was separated from Gladswood - today this building survives on no. 21 Gladswood Gardens, to the south of the main building.
- 1935 – buy back of Lot 5 to extend Gladswood's holding which has access to the pier.
- 1938 – established its existing holding. Perini converted the residence along with building a substantial western addition for "multiple occupancy";
- 1939- 1950s – leased and operated the building as a "Guest House'.
- c. 1990 – Ian Joye's Coronet Investments develop a "European-inspired" block of three three bedroom, two-level apartments behind (west of) Gladswood House.

== Heritage listing ==
As at 24 January 2012, the fabric of the place is an element of the early subdivision of the "Point Piper Estate" and its development as a landmark harbour side estate. It was once a landmark on the point of Double Bay and still retains a relationship with the harbour.

It represents an example of the popular picturesque harbour side "colonial Gothic taste" in building. It is one of the few surviving examples of the domestic work of the architect William Munro.

It is associated with people of importance in cultural, political and commercial history of Australia and New South Wales including Sir Daniel Cooper, William Walker, Samuel Deane Gordon, Thomas Hussey Kelly, Thomas Herbert Kelly, John Spencer Brunton and R. G. Howard Joseland.

Its asymmetrical planning and sitting is representative of a variance to the pointed "Gothic Plan type" in response to its harbour side location. The stained glass windows of the entry vestibule and stairwell date from around 1875 and are excellent examples of the work of the firm of Lyon and Cottier.

Major alterations and additions dating from around 1913 in refurbishing the building have provided joinery and plaster work of excellent quality and craftsmanship. Of particular note are the fireplaces in the Entry Hall, and Dining Room/Ballroom and the feature plaster ceilings contained within these areas.

The iconographical program undertaken in the 1913 interior refurbishment to Rooms G2, G3, G4, G9 and the stained glass and major joinery herein as described in the inventory of items provide a significant variant in their "Baronial program", to early twentieth century interior treatments.

Gladswood House was listed on the New South Wales State Heritage Register on 2 April 1999. Gladswood House is listed on the (now defunct) Australian Register of the National Estate. The Australian Heritage Commission's Statement of Significance cites it as a "Picturesque and historic home which has first class fittings and detail. Base of the original structure remains almost intact."
