= Brunyarra =

Del Monte
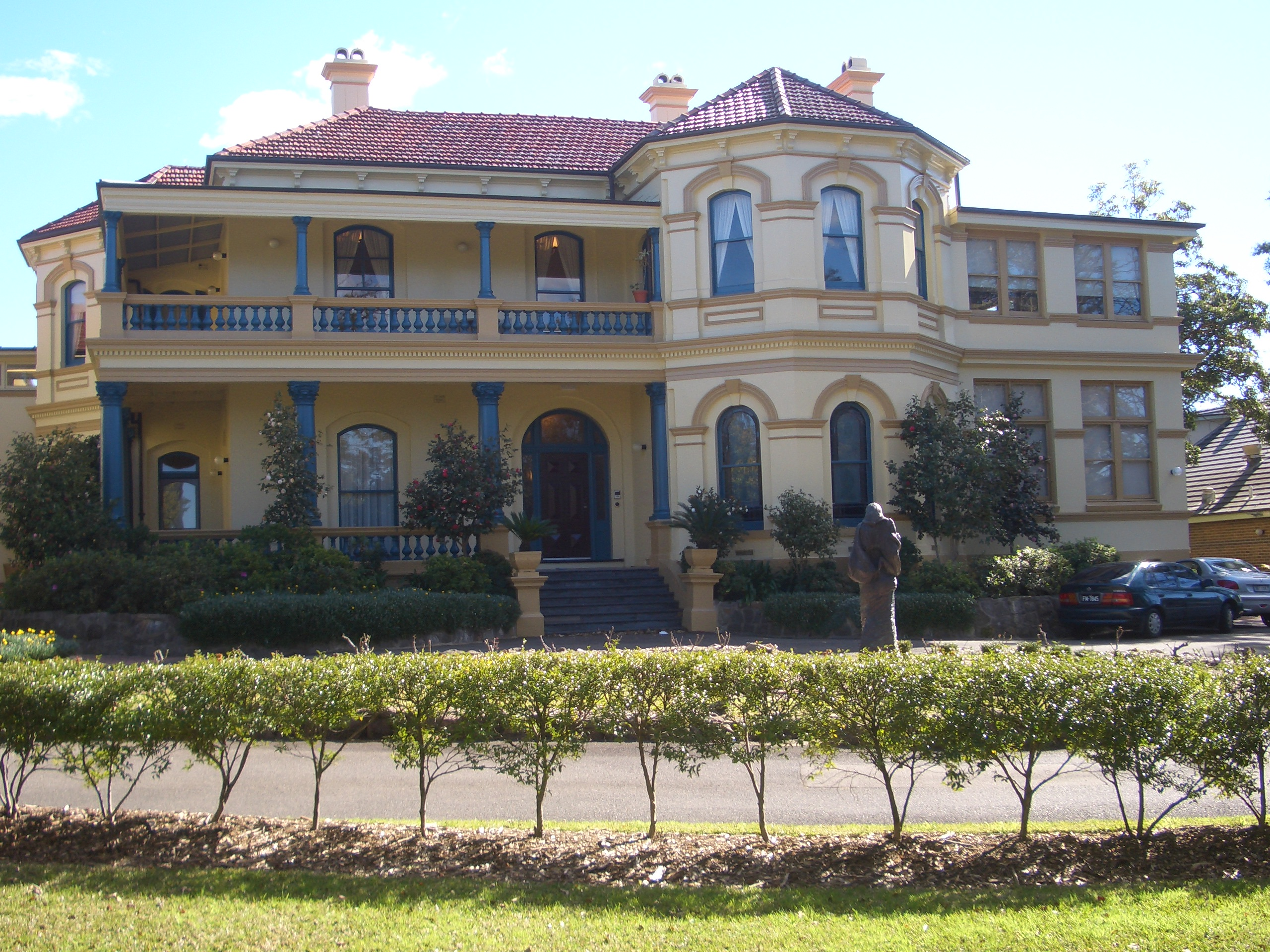
- Interactive map of the Del Monte area
- Former names: Brunyarra

General information
- Type: House
- Architectural style: Victorian Italianate
- Location: Cnr The Boulevarde & Carrington Avenue, Strathfield, New South Wales, Australia
- Coordinates: 33°52′32″S 151°05′35″E
- Completed: 1886
- Governing body: Santa Sabina College

Website
- strathfieldheritage.com

Brunyarra, now known as Del Monte, is a historic house in the Sydney, Australia suburb of Strathfield. The house is now located within the grounds of Santa Maria Del Monte, the junior campus of Santa Sabina College, and is located on the corner of The Boulevarde and Carrington Avenue. It is a heritage listed item on Municipality of Strathfield's Local Environmental Plan.

== History ==
Built in 1886, Brunyarra was the home of John Spencer Brunton (1861–1937), a member of an Australian flour milling family. The house name is believed to be the first syllable of the family name Brunton and Yarra from the Yarra River in Melbourne where Brunton was educated. Brunton sold the house in 1908 and moved to Gladswood House. The next owner was Edward Scholes (1858–1933), a Judge of the District Court and Industrial Court, who purchased Brunyarra for £3,900. Between 1918 and 1928, Brunyarra was owned by Albert Grace of Grace Bros.

Ownership then passed to Mary Bailey who changed the name of the house to Del Monte and ran it as a function and wedding reception centre. On her death in 1950, Bailey bequeathed the property to the Dominican Sisters of Santa Sabina, who the following year opened a new junior school in the house.

== Architecture ==
Brunyarra is representative of the substantial homes built in Strathfield during the later half of the 19th century. It was built in the Victorian Italianate style with a solid and sedate façade. The street front has wide verandahs and balconies to the south-eastern corner decorated with moulded balustrades, columns and bases and ornate capitals.

Arched windows in recessed surrounds and a six-panel entrance door flanked by sidelights and topped by a fanlight add to the detailing of the verandahs and balconies. The low pitched roof, originally in slate, is now finished in concrete tiles. Additions, including an annex to the northern side, the enclosure of the side balcony and buildings to the rear, have been made since the 1950s.
