= Tjukurla Community =

Community in Western Australia

Tjukurla
- Interactive map of Tjukurla
- Coordinates: 24.361°0′S 128.737°0′E
- Country: Australia
- State: Western Australia
- LGA: Shire of Ngaanyatjarraku
- Location: 350 km (220 mi) north east of Warburton

Government
  - State electorate: North West Central
  - Federal division: O'Connor

Area
  - Total: 39.1 km^{2} (15.1 sq mi)

Population
  - Total: 41 (SAL 2021)
- Time zone: UTC+8:00 (AWST)
- Postcode: 6642

Tjukurla is an Aboriginal community, located in the Goldfields-Esperance region of Western Australia, within the Shire of Ngaanyatjarraku.

== History ==
In the early 1980s a bore was put down near the present Tjukurla Community as part of the outstation movement from Docker River community. In mid-1981 an outstation was established at Kintore which provided an opportunity for those living at Papunya to move west, closer to their traditional lands. From Kintore many people moved to Tjukurla as that community's infrastructure developed. Residents also came from Warakurna, Docker River and a few from Warburton.

On 1 July 2024, the community switched from Australian Central Standard Time (UTC +9:30) to the regular time zone for Western Australia, Australian Western Standard Time (UTC+08:00).

== Native title ==
The community is located within the determined Ngaanyatjarra Lands (Part A) (WAD6004/04) native title claim area.

== Governance ==
The community is managed through its incorporated body, Tjukurla Community Aboriginal Corporation, incorporated under the Aboriginal Councils and Associations Act 1976 on 17 February 1987.

== Town planning ==
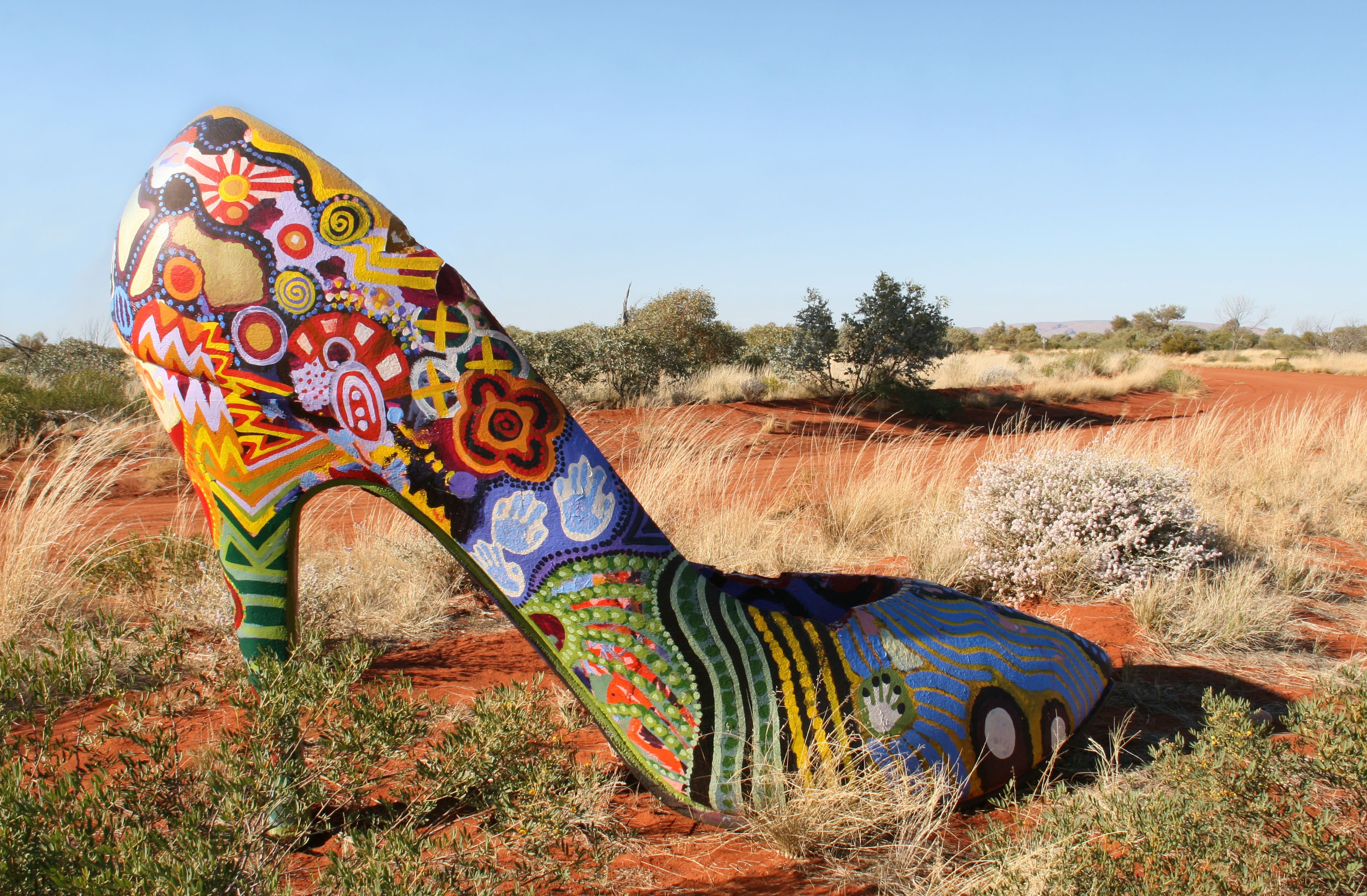
The turnoff to Tjukurla is marked by this large depiction of a stiletto heeled shoe painted in Aboriginal motifs

Tjukurla Layout Plan No.1 has been prepared in accordance with State Planning Policy 3.2 Aboriginal Settlements. Layout Plan No.1 is yet to be endorsed by the community.
