= Patjarr Community =

Community in Western Australia

Patjarr
- Town
- Interactive map of Patjarr
- Coordinates: 24°37′00″S 126°18′51″E
- Country: Australia
- State: Western Australia
- LGA: Shire of Ngaanyatjarraku
- Location: 200 km (120 mi) north of Warburton

Government
  - State electorate: Kalgoorlie
  - Federal division: O'Connor

Area
  - Total: 24.9 km^{2} (9.6 sq mi)

Population
  - Total: 39 (SAL 2021)
- Postcode: 6642

Patjarr, or Karilywara, is a small Pintupi Aboriginal community, located near the Clutterbuck Hills between Lake Cobb and Lake Newell, 243 kilometres by road north west of Warburton in the Goldfields–Esperance region of Western Australia.

== Demographics ==
In 2021, the population of Patjarr was 39. In 2006, 84% of residents identified themselves as being of Indigenous descent. Most of Patjarr's Aboriginal residents are Pintupi-speaking people.

In 2021, the average number of people per household was 4.9 and the median weekly household income was $725.

== History ==
The Pintupi began returning to their homelands near Patjarr in 1979 with a view to setting up a permanent outstation. While the community's governing body, Patjarr Aboriginal Corporation, was incorporated under the Aboriginal Councils and Associations Act 1976 on 28 April 1980, it was not until 1993 that the community and its surrounds were excised from the Gibson Desert Nature Reserve and leased to the traditional owners by the Aboriginal Lands Trust. Native title was determined to exist in 2005, as part of the Stanley Mervyn, Adrian Young, and Livingston West and Ors, on behalf of the Peoples of the Ngaanyatjarra Lands v Western Australia and Ors claim.

== Town planning ==
Patjarr Layout Plan No.2 has been prepared in accordance with State Planning Policy 3.2 Aboriginal Settlements. Layout Plan No.2 was endorsed by the community on 10 October 2008.

== Notable people ==
Pulpurru Davies lives and paints in Patjarr.
