= Wanarn Community =

Community in Western Australia

Wanarn
- Town
- Interactive map of Wanarn
- Coordinates: 25.291°0′S 127.568°0′E
- Country: Australia
- State: Western Australia
- LGA: Shire of Ngaanyatjarraku
- Location: 140 km (87 mi) north east of Warburton

Government
  - State electorate: North West Central
  - Federal division: O'Connor

Area
  - Total: 285.2 km^{2} (110.1 sq mi)

Population
  - Total: 117 (SAL 2021)
- Time zone: UTC+8:00 (AWST)
- Postcode: 6642

Wanarn is a medium-sized Aboriginal community, located in the Goldfields–Esperance region of Western Australia, within the Shire of Ngaanyatjarraku.

== History ==
In Songlines: Tracking the Seven Sisters, historian Margo Neale reports that Wanarn was founded due to its importance to the Seven Sisters Dreaming.

== Native title ==
The community is located within the determined Ngaanyatjarra Lands (Part A) (WAD6004/04) native title claim area.

== Governance ==
The community is managed through its incorporated body, Wanarn (Aboriginal Corporation) (formally Wannan Community (Aboriginal Corporation)), incorporated under the Aboriginal Councils and Associations Act 1976 on 27 June 1989.

== Town planning ==
Wanarn Layout Plan No.1 has been prepared in accordance with State Planning Policy 3.2 Aboriginal Settlements. Layout Plan No.1 was endorsed by the community on 1 December 2003 and the Western Australian Planning Commission on 4 May 2004.
