= Mantamaru Community =

Community in Western Australia

Mantamaru
- Town
- Coordinates: 25.862°0′S 127.664°0′E
- Country: Australia
- State: Western Australia
- LGA(s): Shire of Ngaanyatjarraku
- Location: 120 km (75 mi) east of Warburton

Government
  - State electorate(s): North West Central
  - Federal division(s): O'Connor

Area
  - Total: 62.6 km^{2} (24.2 sq mi)

Population
  - Total(s): 124 (SAL 2021)
- Time zone: UTC+8 (AWST)
- Postcode: 6642

Mantamaru (also referred to as Jameson) is a medium-sized Aboriginal community in the Goldfields–Esperance region of Western Australia, within the Shire of Ngaanyatjarraku.

== Native title ==
The community is located within the determined Ngaanyatjarra Lands (Part A) (WAD6004/04) native title claim area.

== Town planning ==
Mantamaru Layout Plan No.1 has been prepared in accordance with State Planning Policy 3.2 Aboriginal Settlements. Layout Plan No. was endorsed by the community on 7 October 2008.
