= Alfred Gibson =

Australian explorer (1846 – 1874)

- Born: 12th June 1846; Middlesex, London, England
- Disappeared: April 22, 1874 (aged 27–28); Gibson Desert, Western Australia
- Known for: Inspiration for naming of the Gibson Desert
- Relatives: Father: Stuart Gibson Mother: Mary Ann Mayfield Brother: William Gibson

Alfred Gibson (1846-1874) was an Australian explorer who is believed to have died in an 1874 expedition organised by Ernest Giles, which sought to cross the deserts of Western Australia from east to west. Gibson departed from his companions on 22 April 1874 and was never seen again. The Gibson Desert into which he disappeared, was named after him by his fellow explorer.

"Here a short young man accosted me, and asked me if I did not remember him, saying at the same time that he was 'Alf'. I fancied I knew his face, but thought it was at the Peake that I had seen him, but he said "Oh no, don't you remember Alf with Bagot's sheep at the north-west bend of the Murray? My name's Alf Gibson, and I want to go out with you." I said, "Well, can you shoe? Can you ride? Can you starve? Can you go without water? And how would you like to be speared by the blacks outside?" He said he could do everything I had mentioned, and he wasn't afraid of the blacks. He was not a man I would have picked out of a mob, but men were scarce, and as he seemed so anxious to come, and as I wanted somebody, I agreed to take him."

Gibson disappeared when he left Ernest Giles with a compass and his horse, going back to fetch some water for himself, the mare and Giles, leaving Giles walking. Gibson is thought to have lost his way, and was considered dead as he did not return.

Alfred Gibson was the brother of William Gibson (1822-1854) who was a Subordinate Officers' Steward aboard HMS Terror (1813). William Gibson perished during the Franklin Expedition, the British Naval Northwest Passage Expedition, also known as Franklin's lost expedition

Giles wrote:

"As we rode away, I remarked to Gibson that the day, was the anniversary of Burke and Wills's return to their depot at Cooper's Creek, and then recited to him, as he did not appear to know anything whatever about it, the hardships they endured, their desperate struggles for existence, and death there, and I casually remarked that Wills had a brother who also lost his life in the field of discovery. He had gone out with Sir John Franklin in 1845. Gibson then said, “Oh! I had a brother who died with Franklin at the North Pole, and my father had a deal of trouble to get his pay from government.”

== See also ==
- List of people who disappeared mysteriously (pre-1910)
