= Gibson Desert Nature Reserve =

Nature reserve in Western Australia

- IUCN category Ia (strict nature reserve)
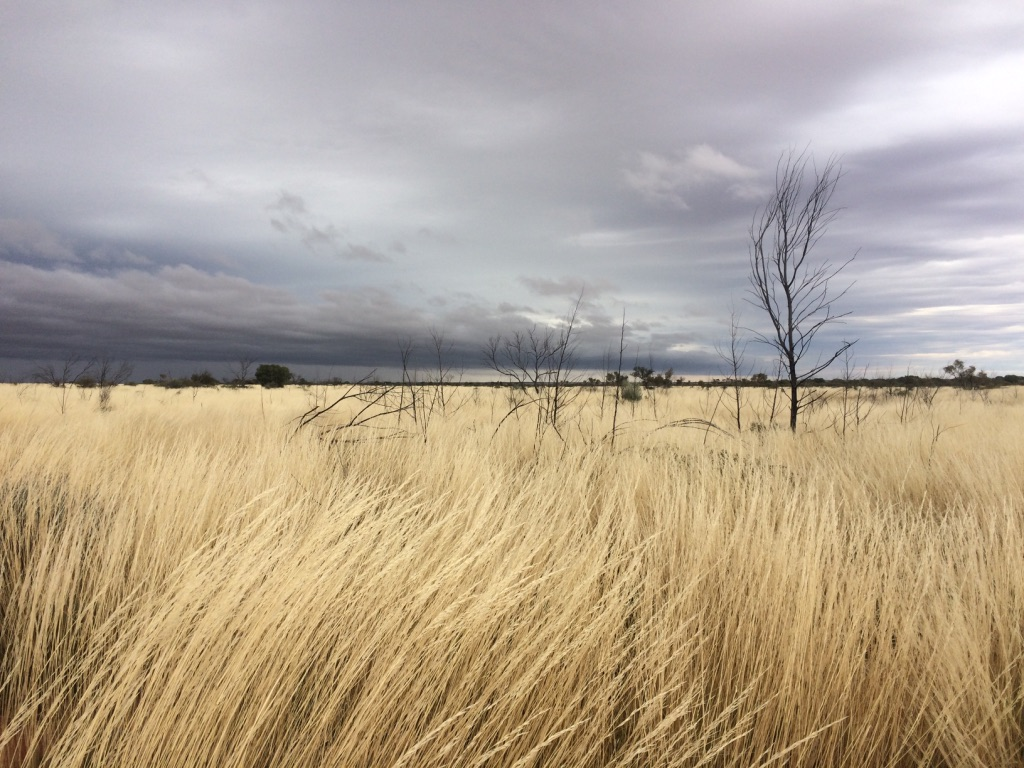
- The Gibson Desert Nature Reserve from Gunbarrel Highway

- Location within Western Australia
- Location: Western Australia
- Nearest city: Wiluna
- Coordinates: 24.748619°S 125.251404°E
- Area: 1,842,053 ha (7,112.21 sq mi)
- Established: 1977
- Governing body: Department of Biodiversity, Conservation and Attractions

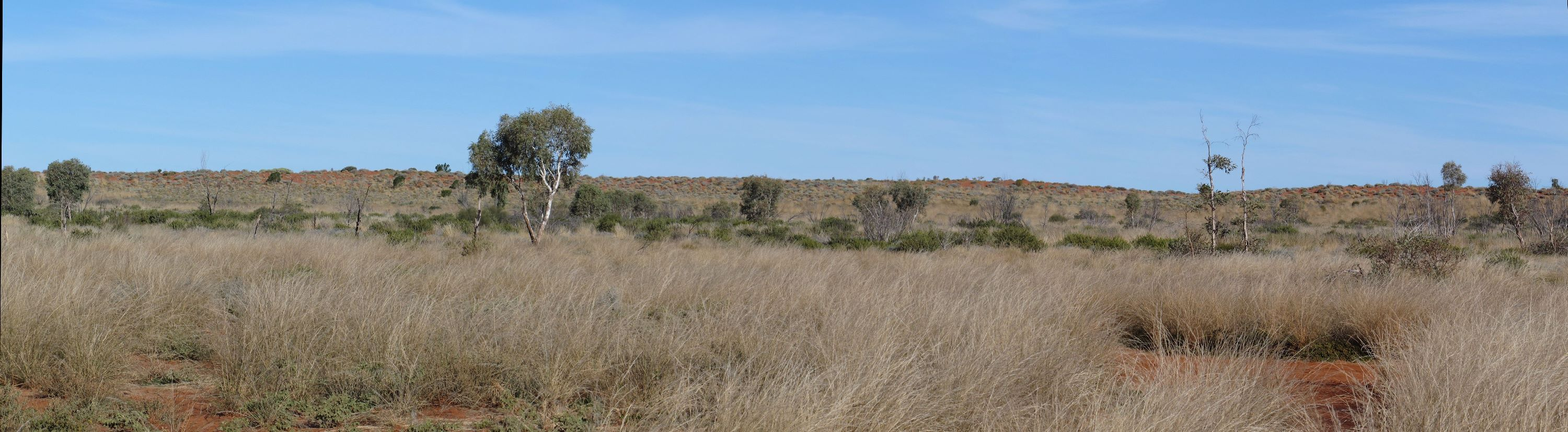
Gunbarrel grasslands and dune in the Gibson Desert Nature Reserve

The Gibson Desert Nature Reserve is an 18,900 km^{2} nature reserve located in the Gibson Desert in central Western Australia. The nature reserve is remote and rarely visited by tourists, and is administered by the Kalgoorlie regional office of the Department of Environment and Conservation.

Located in Australia's arid zone, the reserve's landscape features include sand dune and plains, stony mesaform hills and undulating laterite plains. The dominant vegetation is spinifex interspersed with low shrubs and trees.

The vast pebbles, red sand plains, and hills of this wilderness are home to many diverse reptiles. Here one can find yellow and brown striped snakes and the thorny devil.

In 2020, an agreement with the Gibson Desert People and the Western Australian Government, gave the name Pila Reserve to the area, with management to be shared by the traditional owners, the Gibson Desert People and the Department of Biodiversity Conservation and Attractions.
