= Australian Heritage Commission =

Former statutory authority of Australia

The Australian Heritage Commission (AHC), was the Australian federal government authority managing natural and cultural heritage between 1975 and 2004. It was created via the Whitlam government's Australian Heritage Commission Act 1975 as the first federal heritage body. It was responsible for the creation of the Register of the National Estate.

== Creation and role ==
The Australian Heritage Commission was one of a number of ventures by the Whitlam Labor government to establish cultural heritage as a more substantial government activity. In his policy speech in November 1972, the federal Labor leader said that "...one overriding objective of a Labor government would be to preserve and enhance the quality of the National Estate". When the Labor government came to office in December 1972, a Committee of Inquiry into the National Estate was set up, with terms of reference "...to report on: the nature and state of the National Estate; the measures presently being adopted; the measures which should be adopted; the role which the Australian Government should play in the preservation and enhancement of the National Estate; the manner in which the National Trusts of Australia and other appropriate conservation groups could be supported by public funds and the amount required in order that these bodies can immediately increase their effectiveness, in arguing and working for the preservation and enhancement of the National Estate".

The AHC had wide terms of reference, covering natural, Indigenous and historical heritage. It was first proposed in the government-appointed Committee of Inquiry into the National Estate, chaired by Mr Justice R. M. Hope, in April 1973. The committee reported to federal parliament in August 1974 that "...uncontrolled development, economic growth and 'progress' to that time had had a very detrimental effect on Australia's national estate..." and called for "...prompt action and public education to prevent further neglect and destruction".

An Interim Committee on the National Estate was formed in August 1974 to continue the work of the inquiry and begin to develop a national policy for the national estate, based on UNESCO's Committee for the Protection of World Cultural and National Heritage, which spoke of an "International Estate". The Australian Heritage Commission Act 1975 was assented to on 19 June 1975. The commission was a statutory authority, responsible to the Commonwealth Minister for the Environment, Sport and Territories. Commissioners meet four to six times a year, and with the part-time chairman and six part-time commissioners being chosen for their skills and interest in the natural and cultural environment.

== Standards and criteria ==
In the 1980s and 90s the AHC developed a number of policy documents which became standard heritage practice. Heritage practitioners including Jane Lennon and Michael Pearson were important figures in this process. The first meeting of the seven part-time members of AHC chaired by David Yencken was held on 27 July 1976. A small staff supported the work of the chairman and commissioners.

A critical component of the commission was the creation of the Register of the National Estate, which was intended as an inventory of ...those places, being components of the natural environment of Australia or the cultural environment of Australia, that have aesthetic, historic, scientific or social significance or other special value for future generations as well as for the present community.

The AHC was an important catalyst to other state and local heritage protection and took on the early role of establishing guidelines, standards and criteria for assessment and managing places of heritage significance. An example was the development of the Australian Historic Themes for use by heritage professionals at the national level, as a means for co-ordinating research and significance assessments.

The commission also established criteria for the assessment of places on the Register of the National Estate, which have been subsequently adapted and adopted by most state and community heritage organisation.

== Demise ==
Formed just as the Fraser Liberal-Country coalition government came into power, the AHC came under criticism from mining and development lobbies, and the Commonwealth Government itself over issues such as the Ranger Uranium Mine in Kakadu, and the Gordon-below-Franklin dam proposal which had been placed on the World Heritage List in 1983.

The AHC was ultimately abolished under the Howard Liberal-National coalition government and the Australian Heritage Council formed in its place on 19 February 2004.

== Selected publications ==
- Australian Heritage Commission, 1981, The Heritage of Australia: the illustrated register of the National Estate
- Australian Heritage Commission, 1983, The Heritage of Tasmania: the illustrated register of the National Estate
- Australian Heritage Commission, 1998, Protecting local heritage places: a guide for communities
- Australian Heritage Commission, 2002, Ask first: a guide to respecting indigenous heritage places and values
- Australian Heritage Commission, Background notes, Published irregularly, The Commission, ISSN 0812-2563
- Cairnes, Lorraine, 1996, Australian Natural Heritage Charter: standards and principles for the conservation of places of natural heritage significance, Australian Heritage Commission.
- Cairnes, Lorraine, 1998, Natural heritage places handbook: applying the Australian Natural Heritage Charter to conserve places of natural significance, Australian Heritage Commission.
- Lloyd, C., 1977, The National Estate: Australia’s Heritage, Cassell, Sydney
- Mulvaney, Derek John, 1985, A good foundation: reflections on the heritage of the first government house, Special Australian Heritage Publications Series, Australian Heritage Commission, no. 5.
- Marquis-Kyle, Peter, 1992, The Illustrated Burra Charter: making good decisions about the care of important places, Australia ICOMOS Inc. with the assistance of the Australian Heritage Commission

== National Indigenous Heritage Art Award ==
The National Indigenous Heritage Art Awards, initially known as the National Aboriginal and Torres Strait Islander Heritage Art Awards, were held in Canberra from 1993 until 2000. The accompanying exhibitions were known as The Art of Place.

In November 1993, the International Year for the World's Indigenous People, it was announced in parliament that the AHC would be sponsoring a new art prize for Indigenous Australians, initially known as National Aboriginal and Torres Strait Islander Heritage Art Award. Worth a total prize pool of A$30,000, the prizes would be awarded for "an Aboriginal or Torres Strait Islander work of art which uses a National Estate place as its subject". The subject of the artwork had to be either "in the Register of the National Estate, its Interim List or places the artist believes should be listed". There would be three sections: Open, with a first prize of A$17,000, a photographic section (A$2,500), and a youth section, for artists 25 years and under (A$2,500). Entries were exhibited at Old Parliament House from 15 December 1993 to 12 January 1994, in an exhibition known as The Art of Place.

The awards continued through the 1990s, with the second award staged in 1994; the third in 1996; and the fourth, now called the National Indigenous Heritage Award, was held in April 1998. The 1998 Art of Place exhibition toured to several regional towns in New South Wales as well as Adelaide and Brisbane, attracting some 44,000 visitors. Some exhibition catalogues were published. The exhibitions became known as The Art of Place.

In 2000, then prime minister John Howard gave an opening address at the fifth edition of the awards ceremony. The sponsors that year included the Koori Mail, N. M. Rothschild and Sons and Multiplex. A selection of artworks from the 2000 exhibition toured the country in 2001, funded by the federal government, including Sydney, Wagga Wagga, Alice Springs, Adelaide and Perth in its tour. Sponsorship paid for 36% of the prize money, and a record 436 entries were submitted.

Although the touring exhibition was deemed a success, the awards are not mentioned in subsequent reports of the AHC.

=== Winners ===
- 1993: Ginger Riley Munduwalawala
- 1994: Lin Onus, for Places in the Heart, a painting of Barmah Forest (A$17,000); second prize Datjin Burarrwanga of Buku-Larrnggay Arts in Yirrkala, NT, for his bark painting Gumatj Fire at Matamata (A$5,000); third prize Jeremiah Garlngarr and Louise Nganjmirra of Gunbalanya (formerly Oenpelli), NT, for Bulah Djang (Coronation Hill story) (A$3,000); Youth Award to Donna Burak of Melville Island, NT, (A$2,500) for Wayayi – Night Bird; Photography Section Prize, Alana Garwood, for Ebenezer Mission (A$2,500); Highly Commended, Treahna Hamm (Ginny Firebrace), for Coming into Being.
- 1996: Treahna Hamm (aka Ginny Firebrace), for Remains to be Seen, a hand-coloured etching of the Murray River; also awarded the Heidelberg People's Choice Award (A$5,000)
- 1998: Tjapartji Kanytjuri Bates won the Normandy Heritage Art Prize of A$18,000 for a large glass panel, Tjukurrpa Kungkarangalpa, with Yirrkala painter Naminapu Maymuru-White and Sydney photographic artist Rea tied for second prize. In the same year, Alick Tipoti won the Lin Onus Youth Prize. The other prizes that year were the Works on Paper Prize, won by Sylvia Mulwanany; the Ngunnawal Emerging Artists Prize, won by Gordon Hookey; and the Community Endeavour Prize, won by Lockhart River Aboriginal Community Art and Culture Centre Inc.
- 2000: Wolpa Wanambi, for a painting called Yanawal, a sacred site near the Gurka'wuy River on Trial Bay in eastern Arnhem Land, Northern Territory; Karen Casey and Damian Smith won the Art of Place Reconciliation Award, for their work Bruny.

== See also ==
- Australian Heritage Database
- Australian Heritage Council
