= Gibson Desert =

Desert in Western Australia

Coordinates: 23°S 125°E

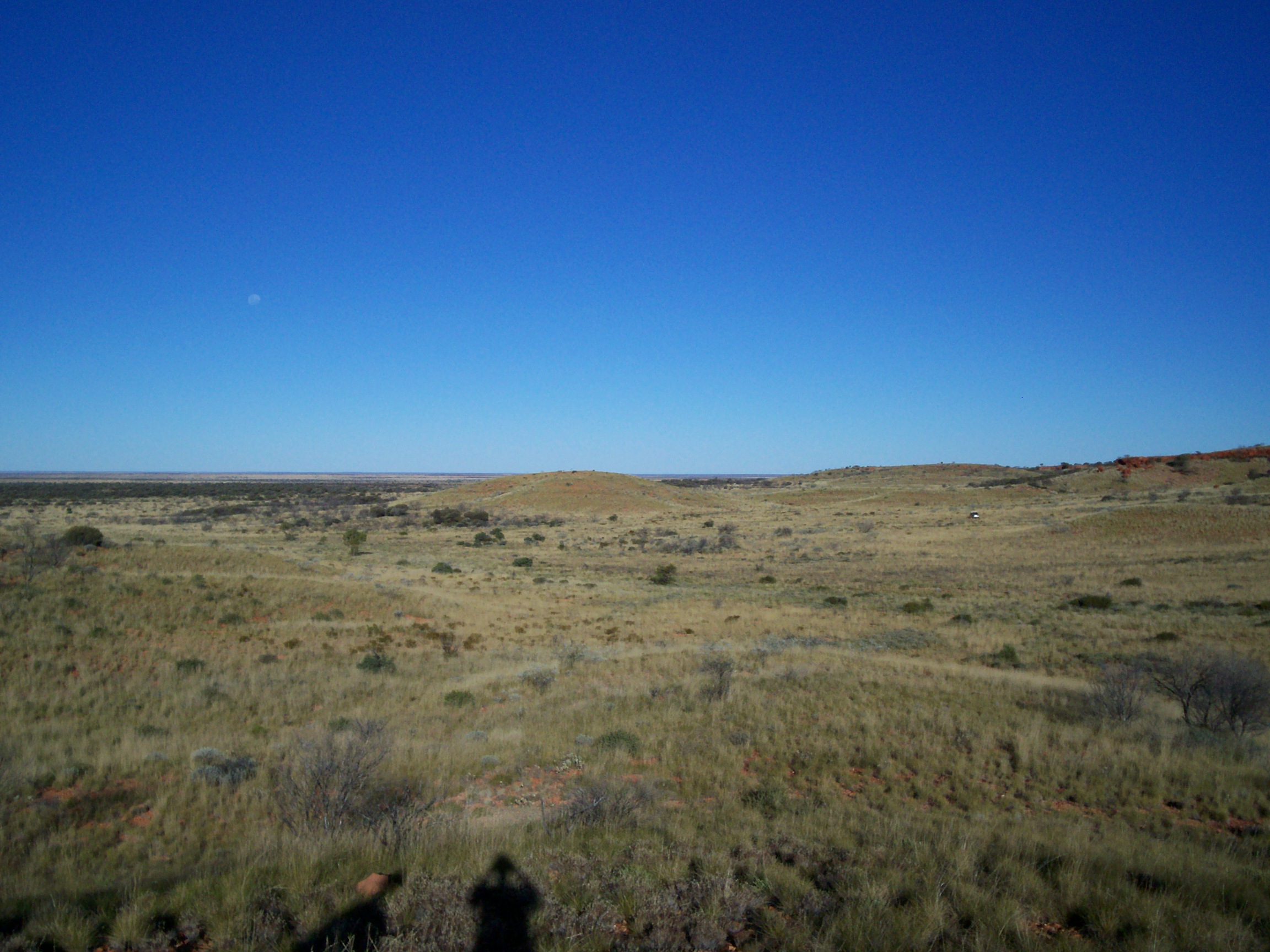
- The typical appearance of the Gibson Desert

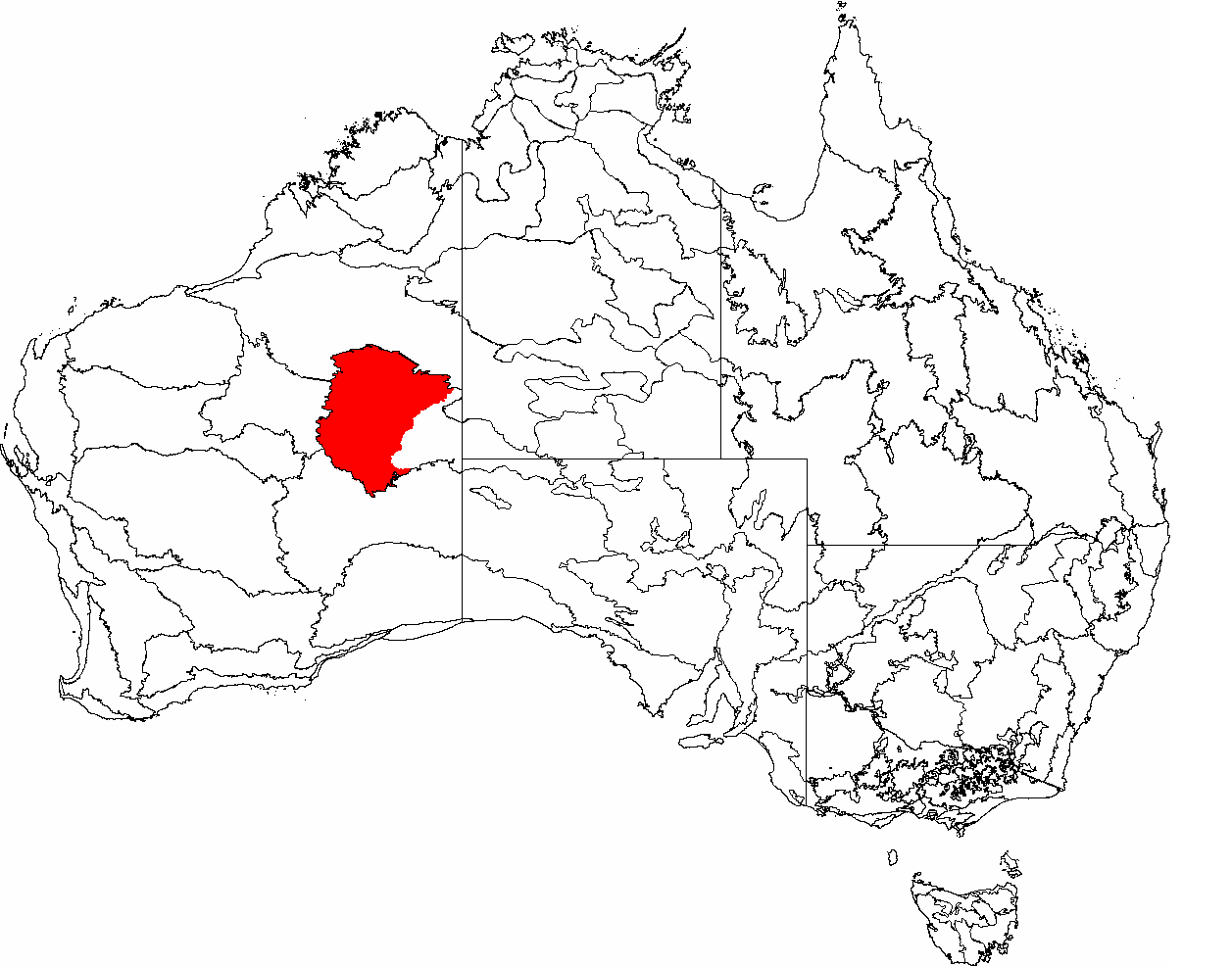
- The IBRA-defined boundaries of the Gibson Desert

Ecology
- Realm: Australasian
- Biome: deserts and xeric shrublands
- Borders: Central Ranges xeric scrub; Great Sandy-Tanami desert; Great Victoria Desert

Geography
- Area: 156,289 km^{2} (60,344 mi^{2})
- Country: Australia
- States: Western Australia

Conservation
- Conservation status: Relatively stable/intact
- Protected: 91,274 km² (58%)

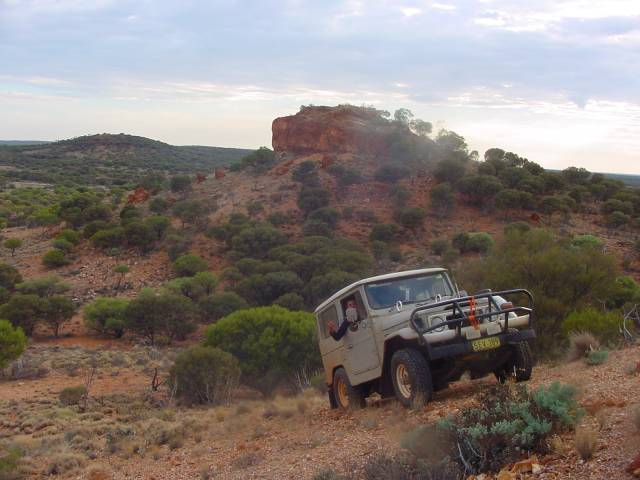
A four wheel drive in the Gibson Desert

The Gibson Desert is a large desert in Western Australia, mainly in an almost pristine state. It is about 155,000 square kilometres (60,000 sq mi) in size, making it the fifth largest desert in Australia, after the Great Victoria, Great Sandy, Tanami and Simpson deserts. The Gibson Desert is both an interim Australian bioregion and desert ecoregion. It is inhabited by a small group of Indigenous Australians.

== Name ==
Explorer Ernest Giles named the Gibson Desert after a member of his party, Alfred Gibson, who became lost and presumably died in this desert during an expedition in 1874.

== Location and description ==
The Gibson Desert is between the saline Kumpupintil Lake and Lake Macdonald along the Tropic of Capricorn, south of the Great Sandy Desert, east of the Little Sandy Desert, and north of the Great Victoria Desert. The altitude rises to just above 500 metres (1,600 ft) in places. As noted by early Australian explorers such as Ernest Giles, large portions of the desert are characterized by gravel-covered terrains covered in thin desert grasses, and it also contains extensive areas of undulating red sand plains and dunefields, low rocky/gravelly ridges and substantial upland portions with a high degree of laterite formation. The sandy soil of the lateritic buckshot plains is rich in iron. Several isolated saltwater lakes occur in the region's centre, and to the southwest, a system of small lakes follows paleo-drainage features. Groundwater sources include portions of the Officer Basin and Canning Basin.

== Ecology ==
=== Flora ===
Buffelgrass is an invasive species in the region.

=== Fauna ===
About 45 species of animal inhabit the Gibson Desert, 6 of which are introduced.

Multiple species have been extirpated, including the western quoll, numbat, red-tailed phascogale, and the golden bandicoot. The extinct lesser bilby used to inhabit the region.

== Climate ==
Rainfall in the Gibson Desert ranges from 200 to 250 millimetres (7.9 to 9.8 in) annually, while evaporation rates are in the range of 3,600 millimetres (140 in) per year. The climate is generally hot; summer maximum temperatures rise above 40 °C (104 °F) whilst in winter the maximum may fall to 18 °C (64 °F) and minimum winter temperatures dip to 6 °C (43 °F).

== Indigenous habitation ==
In much of the region, especially the drier western portion, most of the people living in the area are Indigenous Australians. In 1984, due to a severe drought which had dried up all of the springs and depleted the bush foods, a group of the Pintupi people who were living a traditional semi-nomadic desert-dwelling life, walked out of a remote wilderness in the central-eastern portion of the Gibson Desert (northeast of Warburton) and made contact for the first time with mainstream Australian society. On the eastern margin of the region, population centres (which include people of European descent) include Warburton, Mantamaru and Warakurna. Young Indigenous adults from the Gibson Desert region work in the Wilurarra Creative programs to maintain and develop their culture.

== See also ==
- Deserts of Australia
- List of deserts by area
- Carnegie expedition of 1896
