= Kimberley historical timeline =

This timeline is a selected list of events and locations of the development of the Kimberley region of Western Australia.

Date	Event	Location	Notes
c 120,000 BP	Wolfe Creek Crater formed by meteorite impact	Wolfe Creek Meteorite Crater National Park	
17-25,000 BP	Estimated age of Gwion Gwion (Bradshaws) rock art	Roe River	
c 4000 BP	Estimated age of Wandjina rock art	North-West Kimberley	
1688	William Dampier, first European to the region, sails along the coast	Cape Leveque and King Sound	
1699	William Dampier return journey, leaves after an altercation with Indigenous Australians after a man is killed		
c 1720	Visits of Makassan trepang fishermen begin	Niiwalarra	
1803	Nicolas Baudin sails along the coast charting Cape Bougainville	Admiralty Gulf	
1819	Philip Parker King sails along the coast in HMS Mermaid surveying the coastline	Cambridge Gulf and King Sound	
1820	HMS Mermaid grounded and repaired at Careening Cove, Coronation Island	Coronation Island	
1837	Lieutenants George Grey and Franklin Lushington, and 12 men sailed on the schooner Lynher from Cape Town to Hanover Bay and explore inland	Hanover Bay	
1861	The giant North West pearl oyster the Pinctada maxima was discovered in Roebuck Bay by the crew of the Dolphin.	Roebuck Bay and Eighty Mile Beach	
1864	First white settlement made at Camden Harbour, soon abandoned	Camden Sound	
1865	La Grange expedition shoots dead several Aboriginal men in retaliation for deaths of three white men	Lagrange Bay	
1879	Alexander Forrest trekked across from the western coast to the Northern Territory. Forrest named the Kimberley district, Margaret River, Ord River and the King Leopold Ranges	Kimberley	
1879	Charles Harper suggested to the Legislative Council that Roebuck Bay be set up as a port for the pearling industry	Roebuck Bay	
1880	The Murray Squatting Company take up leases in the newly opened West Kimberley	Yeeda	
1881	The Kimberley Squatting Company take up the lease for Liveringa Station	Liveringa	
1881	First ships using pearl diving equipment arrive in Roebuck Bay, revolutionizing the pearling industry	Roebuck Bay	
1882	The Victorian Squatting Company take up leases on the Drysdale River	Drysdale River Station	
1883	The townsite of Derby is named and established with a Government resident	Derby	
1883	Townsite for Broome chosen by John Forrest, town proclaimed later the same year	Broome	
1883	Leases issued to the MacDonald and MacKenzie families for lands along the Fitzroy River	Fossil Downs Station	
1885	Construction of wooden jetty at Derby completed	Derby	
1885	Gold rush at Halls Creek following discovery by prospectors Charles Hall and John Slattery	Halls Creek	
1885	Gogo cattle station established by the Emanuel family	Gogo Station	
1886	Townsite of for Wyndham chosen by John Forrest	Wyndham	
1887	140 lives lost when pearling fleet hit by cyclone	off Broome	
1887	Lots at townsite for Halls Creek laid out	Halls Creek	
1887	Apostolic Vicariate of Kimberley (later Catholic Diocese of Broome) established	Broome	
1889	Broome connected to Java by telegraph cable landed at Cable Beach	Cable Beach	
1890	Trappist monks establish Beagle Bay mission	Beagle Bay	
1891	Pastoralist Joseph Bradshaw discovers Gwion Gwion rock paintings	Roe River	
1893	Michael and Patrick Durack establish Carlton Hill and Ivanhoe cattle stations	Carlton Hill Station and Ivanhoe Station	
1894	Townsite of Halls Creek gazetted	Halls Creek	
1894	Shootout between posse of white police and settlers and aboriginal band led by Jandamarra	Windjana Gorge	
1897	Jandamarra shot dead by tracker Micki	Tunnel Creek	
1900	Daisy Bates visits Beagle Bay and Broome and reports on conditions	Broome, Beagle Bay	
1908	Construction of wells along Canning Stock Route commences	Halls Creek	
1908	Benedictines establish Drysdale River Mission	Kalumburu	
1908	Irish Sisters of St John of God establish convent in Broome	Broome	
1910	Construction of wells along Canning Stock Route completed	Wiluna	
1913	Forrest River Mission re-established by Anglican Church, run by Ernest Gribble	Oombulgurri	
1915	Several indigenous people killed in Mistake Creek massacre	Mistake Creek, near Lake Argyle	
1916	Sun Picture Gardens outdoor cinema opens	Broome	
1918	Beagle Bay church with pearl shell altar opened	Beagle Bay	
1920	Broome race riots between Japanese and Indonesians, leaving 8 dead	Broome	
1926	Punitive expedition kills unknown number of Aboriginal persons in Forrest River massacre	Oombulgurri	
1931	Fr Worms begins research on Yawuru language and culture	Broome	
1932	Two German aviators rescued by aboriginal fishermen after forced landing on Kimberley coast	Berkeley River	
1936	Derby Leprosarium opened, staffed by nuns led by Sr Mary Gertrude.	Derby	
1938	Australia's only order of aboriginal nuns founded	Broome	
1939	Isaac Steinberg arrives in Perth to promote Kimberley Plan to resettle Jewish refugees in northern Australia	Perth	
1942	Japanese planes attack Broome, killing at least 88	Broome	
1943	Drysdale River mission bombed by Japanese, killing 6	Kalumburu	
1944	Construction of Mungalalu Truscott Airbase completed	Mungalalu Truscott Airbase	
1945	Frank Lacy established Mount Elizabeth cattle station	Mount Elizabeth Station	
1949	Air Beef Scheme commences operation	Glenroy Station	
1949	Townsite of Halls Creek moved 12 kilometres (7 mi) west after flooding and regazetted	Halls Creek	
1951	BHP commence mining Iron ore at Cockatoo Island	Cockatoo Island	
1957	Lease for Home Valley taken up by Harold MacNamara	Home Valley Station	
1959	Construction of barrages and 17-mile dam completed for Camballin Irrigation Scheme	Camballin	
1959	BHP commence mining Iron ore at Koolan Island	Koolan Island	
1959	Mary Durack's book Kings in Grass Castles tells the story of her grandfather Patrick Durack's overland trek from Queensland to the Kimberley		
1960	Construction of Ord River Diversion dam commences	Ord River	
1961	Townsite for Kununurra is proclaimed	Kununurra	
1962	Air Beef Scheme operations cease	Glenroy Station	
1963	Construction of Ord River Diversion dam completed forming Lake Kununurra	Lake Kununurra	
1967	Nurse and aviator Robin Miller begins outback flights delivering polio vaccine		
1969	Construction of Ord River main dam commences	Ord River	
1972	Construction of Ord River main dam completed forming Lake Argyle	Lake Argyle	
1975	Townsite of Fitzroy Crossing is gazetted, town has existed since the 1900s	Fitzroy Crossing	
1978	Kimberley Land Council formed	Noonkanbah Station	
1983	Construction of RAAF Curtin commences	Derby	
1983	Camballin Irrigation Scheme abandoned	Camballin	
1984	Pearl Coast Zoo opened as part of Lord Alistair McAlpine's tourist developments	Broome	
1985	Argyle diamond mine opens	Lake Argyle	
1987	Three murdered by the "Kimberley Killer" Joseph Schwab	Pentecost River	
1988	Construction of RAAF Curtin completed	Derby	
1990	Premiere of Jimmy Chi's musical Bran Nue Dae	Perth	
1993	BHP cease mining Iron ore at Koolan Island	Koolan Island	
1994	Broome campus of University of Notre Dame Australia opened	Broome	
2000	Cyclone Rosita causes severe damage in Broome area	Broome	
2002	Curtin Immigration Reception and Processing Centre closed after riots	RAAF Curtin	
2003	Miriuwung and Gajerrong native title claim recognised by Federal Court	Kununurra	
2003	Purnululu National Park declared a World Heritage Site	Purnululu National Park	
2006	Mining and processing commences at Coyote Gold Mine	Coyote Gold Mine	
2007	Mount Gibson Iron commence mining Iron ore at Koolan Island	Koolan Island	
2007	Filming of Baz Luhrmann movie Australia	Kununurra	
2008	Filming of Bran Nue Dae musical comedy-drama	Broome, Djarindjin	
2008	Documentary film Yajilarra portrays indigenous women's fight against violence in Fitzroy Crossing area	Fitzroy Crossing	
2011	Oombulgurri Community closed down after history of violence	Oombulgurri	
2014	Mount Gibson Iron suspend mining Iron ore at Koolan Island	Koolan Island	
2017	Fitzroy Crossing woman June Oscar appointed Aboriginal and Torres Strait Islander Social Justice Commissioner		
2019	WA Coroner reports on inquest into 13 aboriginal child deaths by hanging	Perth	
2020	Argyle diamond mine closes		
2022	Cyclone Ellie causes record flooding	Fitzroy River	
2022	Multiple injuries in tour boat accident at Horizontal Falls	Horizontal Falls	

== See also ==
- Goldfields-Esperance historical timeline
- Pilbara historical timeline
- Regions of Western Australia
