= List of State Register of Heritage Places in the Shire of Derby-West Kimberley =

List of heritage sites in Western Australia

The State Register of Heritage Places is maintained by the Heritage Council of Western Australia. As of 2026, 100 places are heritage-listed in the Shire of Derby-West Kimberley, of which 20 are on the State Register of Heritage Places.

== List ==
The Western Australian State Register of Heritage Places, as of 2026, lists the following 20 state registered places within the Shire of Derby-West Kimberley:

Place name	Place #	Street number	Street name	Suburb or town	Co-ordinates	Notes & former names	Photo
Wharfingers House, Derby	691	3	Loch Street	Derby	17.300574°S 123.626283°E		
Derby Police Gaol	692		Loch Street	Derby	17.306171°S 123.635718°E	The Grille, Lockup, Native Shelter Shed, The Cage	
Prison Boab Tree	693		4 km from Derby-Gibb River Road	Derby Town Commonage	17.350728°S 123.669957°E		
Liveringa Homestead Group	694		about 120 km south east of	Derby	18.048817°S 124.172634°E	Liveringa Station Homestead Group	
Myall's Bore	695		4 km from Derby-Gibb River Road	Derby	17.349832°S 123.667657°E	Cattle Trough	
Fitzroy Crossing Police Group	696	Lot 21	Russ Road	Fitzroy Crossing	18.179°S 125.592201°E	Old Fitzroy Crossing Police Station Group	
Fossil Downs Homestead Group	697		Fossil Downs Road	Wunaamin Miliwundi Ranges	18.138833°S 125.775444°E	Fossil Downs Station	
Gogo Homestead and Cave School	698		Gogo Road	St George Ranges	18.292222°S 125.583611°E	Margaret Downs	
Bungarun (Leprosarium), Derby	2980		Bungarun Road	Derby	17.280788°S 123.742585°E	Derby Leprosarium	
Fitzroy Crossing Post Office (former)	2984	Lot 22	Russ Road	Fitzroy Crossing	18.178383°S 125.593873°E	Fitzroy Crossing Backpackers Hostel	
Low Level Crossing, Fitzroy Crossing	2985		Yarabi Road	Fitzroy Crossing	18.179999°S 125.597462°E		
Lillimilura Ruins and Grotto	3691		140 km East of Derby, near Windjana Gorge National Park	Lennard River	17.425515°S 124.964177°E	Lennard River Police Camp, Lillmaloora Station	
Derby Tramway Woolshed	4661		Loch Street	Derby	17.300295°S 123.625225°E	Derby Jetty Tramway Woolshed	
Frostys Pool	7207		4 km from Derby-Gibb River Road	Derby Town Commonage	17.348348°S 123.665933°E	Frost Pool	
Derby Town Commonage	7214	Corner	Gibb River Road & Derby Broome Highway	Derby	17.347689°S 123.668461°E		
Royal Flying Doctor Service, House and Office	9727	90	Clarendon Street	Derby	17.308142°S 123.634512°E	Royal Flying Doctor Service Base, Derby	
Holman House	9741		Gibb River turnoff	Derby	17.344445°S 123.66591°E	Doctor's Residence	
Numbala Nunga, Derby	9743	37	Sutherland Street	Derby	17.308547°S 123.653031°E	Government Residency/Derby Native Hospital	
Old Cherabun Station - on Gogo Station	9778		60 km from Fitzroy Crossing	Noonkanbah	18.915626°S 125.526200°E		
Air Beef Abattoir and Aerodrome (ruins) and Glenroy Homestead Group	11738		Glenroy Station, via Derby-Gibb River Road	West Kimberley	17.357°S 126.11°E	Glenroy Meatworks, Glenroy Abattoir	
