= Mount House Station =

Pastoral lease in Western Australia

Coordinates: 17.05°S 125.703°E

Location in Western Australia

Mount House Station, commonly referred to as Mount House, is a pastoral lease that operates as a cattle station in Western Australia.

It is situated about 125 kilometres (78 mi) north of Junjuwa and 245 kilometres (152 mi) north west of Halls Creek, and is accessed via the Gibb River Road. The homestead is situated along the Adcock River, a tributary of the Fitzroy River. The lease takes its name from the naturalist, Dr House. Mount House shares a boundary with Charnley River Station.

Frank Hann crossed the Wunaamin Miliwundi Ranges and explored the area in 1898. He was impressed with the basaltic country around where Mount House and Mount Elizabeth Stations are found today.

Mount House was established early in the twentieth century along with many others in the region; the Blythe family owned and managed the property until the late 1960s. Joseph Blythe had managed Noonkanbah Station for the Emanuel brothers but eventually found the lands between the King Leopold and Philips Ranges.

By 1918 cattle in the Kimberley were suffering from tick fever and red water, with branding at Mount House reduced from 3,000 the previous year to 900.

The Indigenous Australian artist Jack Dale Mengenen was born in the bush at the station in about 1923. He worked as a stockman on many Kimberley properties before taking up painting.

In recognition of the inaccessible nature of the area a pedal wireless set was installed at Mount House in 1936. The Lotteries Commission paid for the set, which was open to use by surrounding stations and the mail service.

Lindsay Blythe, Joseph's son, took an active interest in the family cattle stations after returning from World War II. Lindsay, along with his brothers Douglas and Keith, were responsible for both Mount House and Glenroy Stations, which together occupied approximately 5,058 square kilometres (1,953 sq mi). Blythe proposed an experiment in 1947, slaughtering four bullocks and butchering their carcasses on the station then flying the processed meat directly to Perth overnight using a MacRobertson Miller Airlines aeroplane. The trial was successfully completed the following month with 1 long ton (1.0 t) of meat being delivered. This later became known as the Air Beef Scheme, and operated from 1949 to 1965.

The station was once owned by prominent Sydney barrister Frank Stratton McAlary, who also owned Yeeda Station. The property was managed by his daughter Caitlin. The cattle station was acquired by Kerry Stokes in 2016 for an undisclosed sum.

== See also ==
- List of ranches and stations
