= Gogo Station =

Pastoral lease in Western Australia

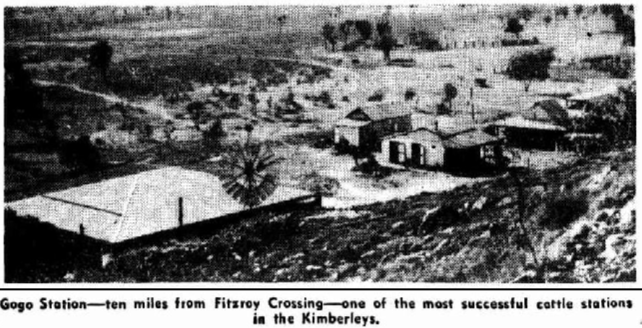
- Gogo Station homestead 1951

- Location within Western Australia

General information
- Type: Station
- Location: 11 kilometres (7 mi) south of Fitzroy Crossing, Western Australia
- Coordinates: 18°17′32″S 125°35′01″E

Western Australia Heritage Register
- Designated: 11 December 1998
- Reference no.: 698

Gogo or Gogo Station and sometimes referred to as Margaret Downs is a pastoral lease that has operated as a cattle station. It is located about 11 kilometres (7 mi) south of Fitzroy Crossing and 83 kilometres (52 mi) north east of Yungngora in the Kimberley region of Western Australia.

The area was first explored by Alexander Forrest in 1879; he gave enthusiastic reports of the well grassed and watered country that would be suitable for grazing lands. Among those to take up leases were the Durack and the Emanuel families who together claimed over one million acres along the Fitzroy River in the West Kimberley and a similar amount along the Ord River in the East Kimberley. After an expedition to the area the Duracks decided to take up the lands along the Ord and the Emanuels took the area along the Fitzroy.

The station was established in 1885, and in 1902 occupied and area of 1,750,000 acres (708,200 ha). The country is on the flood-plain of the Fitzroy River and is well covered in Mitchell and Flinders grass with large areas of spinifex.

A large number of cattle was lost on Gogo and on Fossil Downs Station in 1906 following an extended dry spell. Other neighbouring stations lost several hundred cattle each.

By 1910 the station had an estimated herd of 35,000 cattle and the station manager was being paid an annual salary of £600 a year.

In 1911 the station was being managed by George Piper and was owned by the Emanuel brothers, who also owned Noonkanbah Station located further to the south east.

Following the advent of the revision of the Land Act limiting holdings up to one million acres, several of the properties of the Emanuels had to be disposed of. Gogo was dissolved into three separate properties – Margaret Downs (also known as Gogo), Cherrabun, and Christmas Creek – and these together with Meda Station are still held by the descendants of the original partners.

Moola Bulla Station bought 50 bulls from Gogo to improve their herd in June 1912.

A stockman died at the station in 1913 when he was thrown from his horse. The man, Frank Odman, did not regain consciousness after the accident and died the following day.

By 1917 the station had a herd of 50,000 cattle and was regarded as one of the "best run stations in the Kimberley".

The current homestead was built in 1918 of concrete blocks on a concrete floor. It is situated adjacent to several nearby caves that were had carved in the 1940s.

Cattle tick reached the property in 1918–19, probably transferred from Louisa Downs Station, where the stock had been infected in 1916–17. It affected the herd so severely that branding at Gogo was reduced from 12,000 the previous year to 4,800 in 1918.

Put up for auction in 1920 the station along with its neighbour, Noonkanbah Station. Gogo was advertised as having an area of 2,537,858 acres (1,027,035 ha) on one compact block equipped with 150 miles (241 km) of fencing. The property was described as being abundantly watered by the Fitzroy River, Margaret River, Christmas Creek and various other creeks, but still having several bores with windmills and troughing. The total stock on the property was 60,000 shorthorn cattle along with 400 horses, 50 mules and 44 donkeys. The average rainfall at the station since 1894 was advertised as 22.4 inches (569 mm) per annum. The station was not sold; the Emanuels still owned the station in 1923.

A new station manager, Ted Millard, arrived in 1921. By this stage the frontage pastures along the river and waterholes had become degraded as a result of overgrazing for the last 30 years. Over the entire property the only fenced areas were two horse paddocks and some branding yards, stock were left to graze on the open range. During the 1920s Millard had ten wells sunk and equipped in the back country so stock could make use of the feed in the area and give relief to the over grazed areas. Millard also started fencing paddocks to control stock movement with over 170 miles (274 km) of fences being installed in seven years. Shorthorn bulls were slowly introduced into the herd to breed out white skinned beasts that were unsuitable to the tropical climate. Millard remained on the property for 30 years eventually managing all of the Emanuels properties; Gogo, Cherrabun, Meda and Christmas Creek. He was also noted for taking good care of his Aboriginal workers.

The herd size was estimated at 90,000 in 1928 and Gogo was the biggest station in Western Australia.

The station delivered 394 cattle and 39 bales of wool in 1929 to the port of Derby to be loaded aboard Minderoo and steamed to Fremantle.

In 1930, gas was struck in a water-bore that was drilled at the station. The Freney Oil company held concessions for the area. The well had sunk to a depth of 1,067 feet (325 m) and the presence of gas was confirmed by the station manager, Mr Millard.

Over 500 cattle were shipped from the station in 1932 aboard Centaur from the port in Derby. A further 883 bullocks were shipped on Minderoo to Port Hedland in 1935, then another 454 were shipped in 1936 also aboard Centaur and bound for Carnarvon. A shipment of 526 cattle were shipped from Gogo in 1937 aboard Centaur, with another 422 sent in 1938 aboard Charon and 450 sent from Derby aboard Gordon bound for Fremantle.

During an influenza epidemic in the Kimberleys in 1934, 12 Aboriginal people died from the disease on Gogo out of the 129 fatalities overall.

In 1947 Gogo shipped 2,580 cattle from Derby out of 6,760 that were sent from all the stations in the surrounding area; in 1948 450 bullocks were shipped aboard Gorgon.

During the wet season in 1949, six Aboriginal people were struck by lightning during a tropical storm. They were all severely burnt and one as still unconscious the next day when they were taken to Fitzroy Crossing hospital.

In a report made to the Commonwealth Government in 1950 by the Department of Agriculture it was found that in a survey performed by a Mr. Poggendorff that 16 square miles (41 km^{2}) of Gogo would be suitable for rice cultivation, despite the fact that previous experimental plots had failed in the Kimberley in 1948.

The Emanuels continued to improve the herd by purchasing poll shorthorn bulls from the Melara stud including Melara Formidable (6) and Melara Royal Rebel (4) in 1950.

The area was struck by drought between 1951 and 1953, with the number of cattle being reduced by half. This was the first drought suffered by pastoralists in 70 years, with many hurriedly sinking bores and buying feed to keep their stock alive. Other nearby properties that were affected in Noonkanbah, Liveringa, Quandan, Cherrabun, Glenroy, Fossil Downs, Luiluigui, Christmas Creek and Bohemia Downs Station.

In 1954 at Gogo Station, Preston Walker of United Aborigines Mission Fitzroy Crossing married their head stockman Jock Shandley and his bride Rita.

In 1985 an area of 1 square mile (3 km^{2}) was excised from the property to form the Aboriginal community of Yakanarra, which is home to about 150 Indigenous Australians.

In 2010 the station was owned by the New South Wales based Harris family. A trial for wet season cropping on a large scale was conducted in 2010 with 480 hectares (1,186 acres) of sorghum being planted. The crop in turn will be used to fatten the cattle prior to export.

Thousands of hectares at Gogo were burnt out in 2011 when a fire was deliberately lit at the Muludja Community near Fitzroy Crossing. A local man, affected by alcohol, started the fire after an argument; he was later arrested and charged with arson following a tip-off from the public.

== See also ==
- Gogo Formation
- List of ranches and stations
- List of the largest stations in Australia
