= Djaru people =

Indigenous Australian people of the southern Kimberley region of Western Australia

The Djaru people are an Aboriginal Australian people from the southern part of the Kimberley region of Western Australia.

== Language ==
Djaru is a member of the Ngumbin language family, and is related to Walmajarri.

== Country ==
The Djaru people ranged along Margaret River as far as the Mary River Junction. Their land took in the headwaters of Christmas Creek, ran eastward to Cummins Range, Sturt Creek Station (Note: "The Sturt Creek valley in the region of Sturt Creek Station is known locally as 'mix-up' country, that is, country that is accessed by members of adjacent language groups usually because of the need to share resources and the sacred/significant sites along Sturt Creek." (Smith 2016, p. 4)) up to the border with the Northern Territory. Its northern boundary lay in the vicinity of the Nicholson Station homestead, and the headwaters of the Ord River above the Dixon Range, and including the areas east of Alice Downs as far as Halls Creek and the Margaret River gorge. In Norman Tindale's estimation the total land range encompassed something like 13,000 square miles (34,000 km^{2}). The area is now known as the Kutjungka Region.

== Trade ==
The Djaru, like the Gija, much admired the composite spears, fitted with barbed pegs, of their southern neighbours, fashioned from mulga hardwood and witjuti bush shrubs and to obtain them would exchange them for stone knives and pressure-flaked spear blades (tjimbala), and pearl shells which filtered down from the coast where they had been collected by the distant Jawi.

== History of contact ==
Massacres of Aboriginal people in the Kimberleys were commonplace as the land was cleared for settlement and pastoral stations. An early massacre at Hangman's Creek, otherwise undocumented in colonial archives, remains undated but is associated with the name of Sergeant Richard Henry Pilmer. (Note: Pilmer's tour of duty at the Fitzroy Crossing Police Station lasted from 1894 to 1902, during which he massacred people on Bunuba lands. There is some doubt whether the Hangman's Creek massacre recounted here could have occurred at that time. He was, however, charged with patrolling the Roebourne district, with a huge extension from Port Hedland to the Northwest Cape over to the South Australian border from 1905 onwards. Tomlinson argues that would have made his name familiar to the Aboriginal people of the East Kimberley area. (Tomlinson 2008, p. 81, n.18)) (Note: In his memoirs, Pilmer would write that he was outraged on encountering the practice of white men flogging Aboriginal people but later took on the practice as part of his duties and received 10 shillings per flogging.(Olive 2007, p. 88))

Djaru had been responsible for killing in separate incidents four outsiders, a stockman, a surveyor, a miner, and a Chinese man at Ruby Plains Station. Native tradition holds that Pilmer rode out in a buggy and rounded up a mob of Djaru to get them to dig a "well". Once that work was completed, he then strung them all up on a walarri (Note: Perhaps either Corymbia bella or Corymbia grandifolia. (Meakins & Nordlinger 2014, p. 462)) gum tree and buried them in the well. The place thereby earned the name of Hangman's Creek. The primary victims of that particular slaughter were, according to Norman Tindale, the Margaret River Djaru.

In September 1922, two settlers, Joseph Condren and Tim O'Sullivan, were murdered at Billiluna homestead. According to one account, a Guluwaring man Goose Hill near Kununurra, known as Banjo, (Note: Banjo was a trusted stockman and had been wounded by a spear thrown by other blacks in 1917-1918. In retribution, according to another station hand, Grant Ngabidj, seven whites, including four policemen from Hall's Creek, came across a mob of Aboriginal people and "They did not tie them up or take them to the jail house; they murdered the whole lot of them, shot them all: Balgo mob, Sturt Creek mob and Billiluna mob; women, piccaninnies, dogs, old people, young people, middle-sized people - finished them." (Smith 2016, p. 50)) seized a gun and shot first Sullivan, and then Condren, while the latter two were branding cattle with the assistance of several natives. The reason given for the murder was Banjo acting to revenge himself on Sullivan who had taken away his wife, Topsy. The other blacks, who tried to intervene, were held at bay by Banjo, who threatened them with the rifle.

According to indigenous traditions, the first massacre that ensued in retaliation for the killings took place at Kaningarra between wells 48 and 49 on the Canning Stock Route. The incident is undocumented and relies on the testimony of the three sons of Riwarri, the only adult survivor. (Note: Milner Sturt, Boxer Milner and Speiler Sturt. (Smith 2016, p. 2)) In this account, a police punitive expedition came across an encampment in which Aboriginal people were cooking camel meat, and they kept shooting into it until they ran short of ammunition. Those who survived were led off tethered by neckchains to a site called the "Goat Yard" at Denison Downs. A police party, led by Constable J.J. Cooney, engaged ostensibly in a search for the culprit, was in the Walmajarri area from 12 to 31 October at the time of the reported slaughter.

The second incident, soon afterward, took place at the former Denison Downs homestead on the Sturt Creek Station, in a site referred to as Chuall Pool where many Djaru, together with Walmajarri, were murdered. The victims were the survivors of the Kaningarra massacre. A recent archaeological study of two sites, identified by the tribal custodians, as the goat yard and the women and children's site, turned up ample evidence of calcinated bone fragments that were the residue of exposure to prolonged extreme heat, which was created by a fire accelerant like kerosene wholly atypical of hunter-gatherer hearths. On the other hand, the "well-digging" story, it was inferred, cannot have been accurate since the indicated well had been constructed before then. Otherwise, the archaeological study confirmed the likelihood that police had massacred an unknown number of Aboriginal people at this second site.

== Alternative names ==
- Charrau
- Deharu
- Djara (? misprint)
- Djaro
- Jarroo, Jarrou, Jarrau
- Jaruo
- Jaruru
- Ka:biri (Margaret River group)
- Karbery
- Kodjangana (northern Djaru)
- Njining, (Note: Smith treats the Nyining as a separate tribe following a distinction made by Ronald Berndt. Tindale dismissed this distinction as incorrect, writing that "the name Njining applies to all Djaru people and seems to be a true alternative name. It is more in use at Flora valley than it is farther west." (Tindale 1974, p. 240)) Njinin, Nyinin, Nining, Neening (language name)
- Ruby Creek tribe

Source: Tindale 1974, pp. 240–241

== Some words ==
- jaji (kangaroo)

== Sources ==
- "AIATSIS map of Indigenous Australia". AIATSIS. 14 May 2024.
- Harrison, Rodney (2009). "Materiality, 'Ambiguity' and the Unfamiliar in the Archaeology of Inter-Societal Confrontations: A Case Study from Northwest Australia" (PDF). In Cornell, Per; Fahlander, Fredrik (eds.). Encounters/Materialities/Confrontations: Archaeologies of Social Space and Interaction. Cambridge Scholars Publishing. pp. 42–57. ISBN 978-1-443-80410-3.
- Meakins, Felicity; Nordlinger, Rachel (2014). A Grammar of Bilinarra: An Australian Aboriginal Language of the Northern Territory. Walter de Gruyter. ISBN 978-1-614-51274-5.
- Olive, Noel (2007). Enough is Enough: A History of the Pilbara Mob. Fremantle Press. ISBN 978-1-921-06445-6.
- Smith, Pamela A. (February 2016). Purrkuji: Massacre on Sturt Creekj Report onf the History, Archaeological Survey and Forensic Investigation (PDF). Department of Archaeology, Flinders University.
- "Tindale Tribal Boundaries" (PDF). Department of Aboriginal Affairs, Western Australia. September 2016. Archived from the original (PDF) on 8 March 2016.
- Tindale, Norman Barnett (1974). "Djaru (WA)". Aboriginal Tribes of Australia: Their Terrain, Environmental Controls, Distribution, Limits, and Proper Names. Australian National University Press. ISBN 978-0-708-10741-6. Archived from the original on 20 March 2020.
- Tomlinson, Derrick (2008). Too white to be regarded as Aborigines: An historical analysis of policies for the protection of Aborigines and the assimilation of Aborigines of mixed descent, and the role of Chief Protectors of Aborigines in the formulation and implementation of those policies, in Western Australia from 1898 to 1940. University of Notre Dame PhD.
