= Daisy Andrews =

Australian artist (c. 1934 or 1935–2015)

Munmarria Daisy Andrews
- Born: c. 1934 or 1935; Cherrabun, Western Australia
- Died: January 2015
- Occupation: Artist
- Notable work: Lumpa Lumpa (wet time) landscape
- Spouse: Adam Andrews
- Children: eight
- Awards: Telstra Award (National Aboriginal and Torres Strait Islander Art Awards)

Munmarria Daisy Andrews, known professionally as Daisy Andrews, (c. 1934 or 1935 – January 2015) was an Australian artist originally from the Walmajarri desert tribe. After taking up artwork later in life – initially illustrating the personal stories of fellow community members – Andrews began exhibiting her paintings in group and solo showings across Australia. She was known for her vividly red landscapes showcasing the mountain ranges of the Great Sandy Desert. In 1994, she received the main Telstra award from the National Aboriginal and Torres Strait Islander Art Awards (NATSIAA) for her painting Lumpa Lumpa (wet time) landscape.

Andrews' work is held in collections owned by the Australian National Gallery, the Museum and Gallery of Northern Territory, the Queensland Art Gallery, the Berndt Museum of Anthropology, the North Australian Research Unit, and the Karrayili Adult Education Centre. A tapestry version of one of her paintings hangs in the Australian Embassy in Tokyo, Japan.

== Early life ==
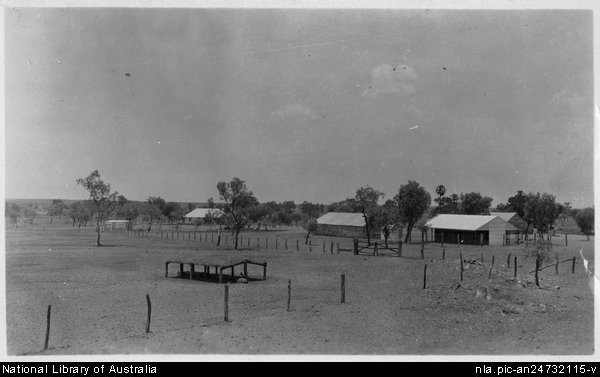
Moola Bulla cattle station, c. 1951

Munmarria Daisy Andrews was born circa 1934 or 1935 at Cherrabun station. Her parents, Jack Pinden and Ruby Jarlkurr, belonged to the indigenous Walmajarri desert tribe, and when their daughter was born they were in the process of moving north out of the desert, compelled by a combination of drought, conflict between tribes, and the encroachment of water resources by white settlers. Jack Pinden had three wives. Andrews had an elder brother named Boxer Yankarr and a sister.

Although Andrews' father attempted to take his family back to their former home in the desert, they were repeatedly obstructed by white police, and Andrews' father was sometimes forced to return to the city in chains. The family was finally sent to the government-run station of Moola Bulla.

== Career ==
After 1981, Andrews began taking classes in reading and writing English at the Karrayili Adult Education Centre. When the men in the class began writing stories about their early memories and family history, Andrews and her fellow female students began illustrating the stories through visual arts, and this soon led Andrews to focus on painting.

In 1991, Andrews participated in her first group art show in Adelaide, and two years later her art was featured in the exhibition "Images of Power" at the National Gallery of Victoria. In 1994, Andrews received the primary Telstra award from the National Aboriginal and Torres Strait Islander Art Awards (NATSIAA) for her painting Lumpa Lumpa (wet time) landscape. Between 1991 and 2016, her work was featured in over 40 group exhibitions across the country, and she held solo exhibitions at art galleries in Brisbane, Sydney, Perth and Melbourne. In 1996, Andrews painted a 12-metre Great Sandy backdrop for a production of Alcina by the West Australian Opera.

Besides the National Gallery of Victoria, Andrews' work can be found in the collections of the Australian National Gallery, the Museum and Gallery of Northern Territory, the Queensland Art Gallery, the Berndt Museum of Anthropology, the North Australian Research Unit, and the Karrayili Adult Education Centre. Her art was chosen by the Australian Tapestry Workshop to be translated into a woven form, and the resulting wool tapestry is displayed in the Australian Embassy in Tokyo, Japan.

== Artistic style and subject ==
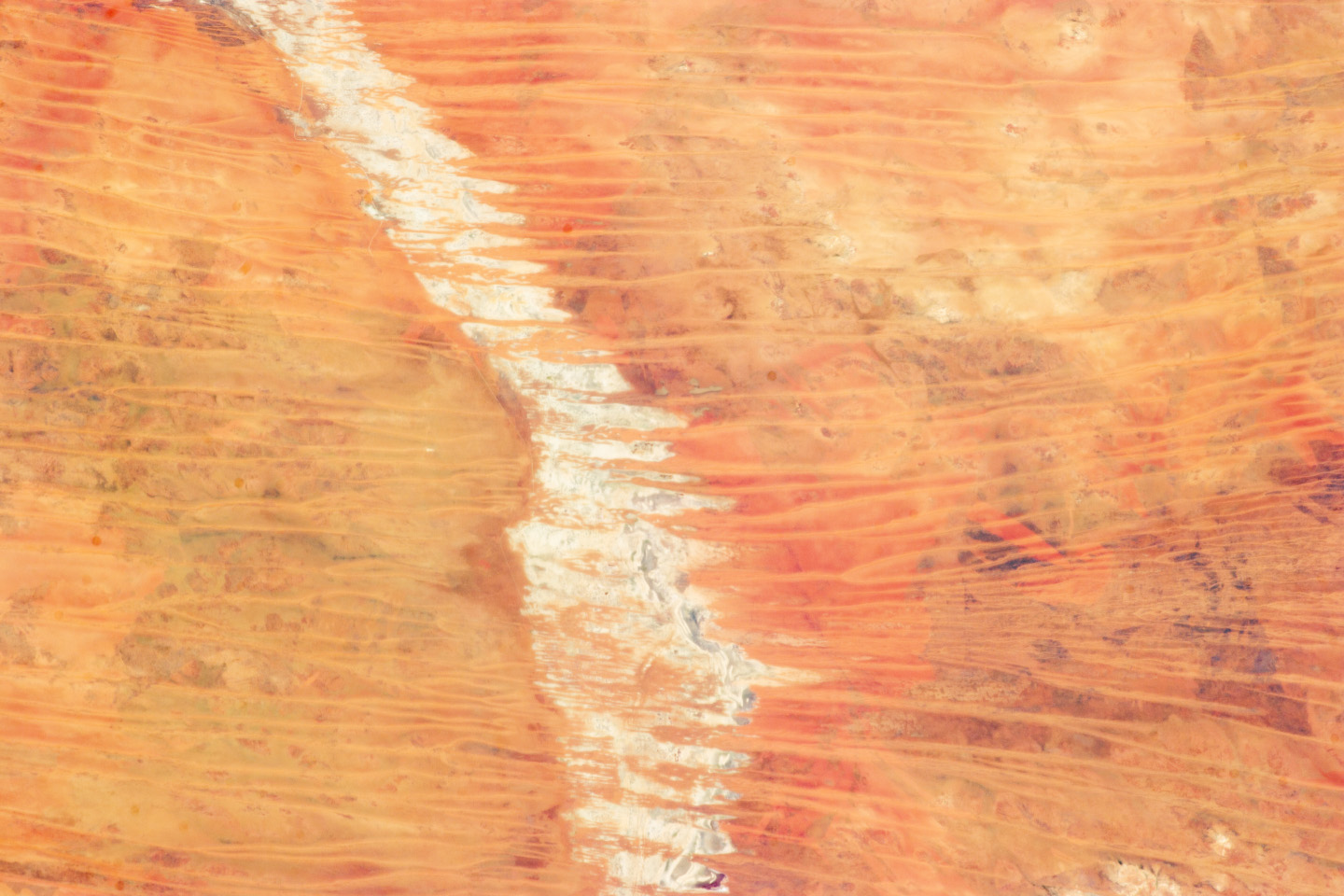
A NASA photograph of the Australian Great Sandy Desert.

Over the course of her career as an artist, Andrews focused on painting the northern mountain ranges of the Great Sandy Desert. She portrayed the landscape in all seasons and weather. Andrews often painted her landscapes with deep red pigments. She stated that much of her work was inspired by painful family stories of tribal massacres and the destruction of Aboriginal landmarks and sacred spaces: "When I paint, I think of blood".

== Personal life ==
As a young woman, Andrews met a Bunuba man named Adam Andrews, and the couple began a relationship that led to marriage. Daisy described their feelings for each other as "young days love". They eventually had eight children.

Andrews was a singer as well as a painter. She passed on her knowledge of traditional songs and ceremonies to Australian youth. She co-founded the Kimberley Language Resource Centre and also helped establish the Karrayili Adult Education Centre.

== Death ==
Andrews died in January 2015.
