= Yungngora Community, Western Australia =

Community in Western Australia

Yungngora Community
- Town
- Interactive map of Yungngora Community
- Coordinates: 18°30′00″S 124°50′00″E
- Country: Australia
- State: Western Australia
- LGA: Shire of Derby-West Kimberley
- Location: 280 km (170 mi) from Broome; 100 km (62 mi) from Fitzroy Crossing; 255 km (158 mi) from Derby

Government
  - State electorate: Kimberley
  - Federal division: Durack

Population
  - Total: 434 (UCL 2021)
- Postcode: 6765

Yungngora is a medium-sized Aboriginal community in the Kimberley region in northern Western Australia, situated approximately 280 km east-south-east of Broome and 100 km south-west of Fitzroy Crossing. At the 2016 census, Yungngora had a population of 378.

== Background ==
The community is located on the Noonkanbah Station on the banks of the Fitzroy River between Camballin and Fitzroy Crossing. Yungngora is the gateway to communities further inland such as Kadjina Community and Yakanarra Community. The main access road is unpaved and so becomes inaccessible during the wet season.

=== History ===
Some members of the Yungngora people were removed to Beagle Bay Community as part of the Stolen Generation.

The pastoral lease at Noonkanbah was purchased for the community in 1976. Great controversy surrounded the township when its citizens opposed the exploratory oil drilling at a sacred site on the station by the American oil miner AMAX in 1979.

In 2001 land on Noonkanbah was returned to the community.

== Education ==
Yungngora Community has a school, Kulkarriya Community School, which was established in 1978 for students from pre-primary to Year 12 in the Western Australian education system. The primary and secondary school population for the year 2007 was 87.

== Town planning ==
Yungngora Layout Plan No.2 was prepared in accordance with State Planning Policy 3.2 Aboriginal Settlements and was endorsed by the community and Western Australian Planning Commission in 2009. The layout plan map-set and background report can be viewed at Planning Western Australia's web site.

== Facilities ==
=== Electricity supply ===
Electricity supply is currently regularised and now managed by Horizon Power, under the state government-funded Aboriginal and Remote Community Power Station Project.

The power station has four 300 kW Scania diesel engines and a 200 kW solar photovoltaic array (fixed). It uses battery storage to smooth any fluctuations in the solar output. Horizon Power contracted GHD to deliver the solar power integration into the diesel power station and MPower were engaged as the site contractor to deliver the solar installation.

As with many remote Aboriginal communities, residents and businesses will use pre-payment cards to pay for electricity and will be eligible to receive electricity at government-gazetted uniform tariff rates.

=== Water ===
There are two bores next to the power station which pump into the ground tank. The bores pump the water from approximately 100 metres from below the ground level, despite the community being situated on the banks of the Fitzroy River. A transfer pump station then pumps the water into the high level tank. The water has been recorded as coming out of the ground at between 50 and 60 degrees C. It is this condition which has prompted the installation of cooling towers. There are occasional interruptions.

=== Sewerage ===
There is a sewer system in place in the community which comprises one pump station near the football oval and treatment ponds on the northern outskirts of the community.

=== Recreation ===
The community has basketball courts and a football oval. Yungngora fields a team in the Central Kimberley Football League called the "Noonkanbah Blues".

Bush walking, some fishing and camping are the dominant pursuits for tourists visiting. Visitors are required to apply for a permit prior to entering the Community.

=== Shopping ===
There is one store in town, owned and operated by the Community. All items are quite expensive compared to major centres but due to transport costs to remote locations. Mechanical repairs may be effected at the mechanical workshop.

== See also ==
- Aboriginal communities in Western Australia
