= Kadjina Community, Western Australia =

Community in Western Australia

Kadjina Community Western Australia
- Coordinates: 18.82°S 124.94°E
- LGA(s): Shire of Derby-West Kimberley
- State electorate(s): Kimberley
- Federal division(s): Durack

Kadjina is a community situated approximately 300 km ESE of Broome and 100 km SW of Fitzroy Crossing in the central south of the Kimberley region of Western Australia.

== Education ==
Kadjina Community is situated on the edge of the Great Sandy Desert in the Kimberley region of Western Australia. It has a school called Wulungarra Aboriginal Independent Community school, which caters for children from 3 years of age to year 10. The school is named after the nearby Wulungarra Hill, which has a story sacred to the area.

The school began as a campus of Noonkanbah Station in 1987 when the Laurel family first moved to Kadjina. Everyone lived at the old station house and the school was there as well. In 1997 Wulungarra became independent from Noonkanbah and the community and school moved to the current position. At that time the school only had one teacher. As of 2012 it had two classrooms, a library, a staff room and administration building, computer room, music room and a kitchen where lunch (provided by members of the community) was cooked each day. The music room is extensively used by the local musicians and also as a third classroom when needed. The computer room is also used outside school hours.

There is a non-teaching principal, usually two teachers, two or three Aboriginal education workers and three or four other locals who are employed as cook, gardener, administrative worker. The Kimberley Aboriginal Law and Cultural Centre employs a local person to be in charge of the language and cultural aspects of the school. This person works closely with the chairperson and principal, and delivers and plans language classes, bush trips and inter-community events with other Walmajarri communities.

The school kitchen is called a homemaker centre and is usually run by a local elder who cooks a hot meal every day for all the children in the community. The food for this hot lunch is provided by members of the community through "chuck-in". Children also receive a piece of fruit at morning break supplied by school.

The school focuses on teaching culture and language, conducted by the local elders, especially Yangkana Laurel, who is a renowned artist in her own right. Bush trips are often taken to show the children their culture and to learn the ways of their ancestors. In an effort to preserve the cultural heritage of the community, people tell their stories in their own language, Walmajarri. People from the Kadjina Community have worked with the Wulungarra Community School to produce a series of children's books. Between 2011 and 2013 a number of these books were digitised in partnership with the State Library of Western Australia and are available to view online.

The children speak at least three languages. The main language is Kriol, the native language is Walmajarri and school is conducted in Australian English.

A problem for the school is one of transience. Because family is so important to the community members, people are often away from the community visiting family. This has a severe impact on the ability of the school to run systematic programs. However, the school believes that every child who turns up will receive the full attention of the teachers. The agreement between the school and community says that every child of school age who comes to the community must attend school and this is adhered to stringently. It can make things difficult for planning but Wulungarra is sometimes the only school that children attend, when they visit Kadjina.

== Electricity supply ==
Electricity is supplied by the Government of Western Australia and comprises the Australian standard three phase 415/240 volts system. There are frequent power surges and interruptions. In 2011, after much lobbying, a new generator was installed and the power interruptions lessened considerably.

== Water ==
There are two bores near the old Millijiddee homestead, which pump to the high level water tank. There are occasional interruptions. Recent upgrades to the water supply have ensured that the water quality is high. The pressure is now good and is used for the reticulation systems of the school as well as a number of the houses. Occasionally, the water has a muddy colour but it is still quite suitable for drinking and comes out of the ground at quite a cool temperature.

== Sewerage ==
There is no sewerage system in place in the community. The school has its own septic tank which has to be emptied about every five years. Each of the houses also has a septic tank.

== Recreation ==
Bush walking, some fishing and camping are the dominant pursuits for tourists visiting. Visitors are required to apply for a permit prior to entering the Community. The school office acted as the community centre and office.

Music is a very popular pastime in the community. There are a group of musicians who use the newly established music room to practice their music and write their songs. They are aiming to put together a program of 30 songs to present at local gigs.

The school has a set of bikes which are used by the local children in an active after school program and for rides to the local creeks.

The local community loves fishing and can often be found heading off to their favourite fishing holes along the Fitzroy River.

== Shopping ==
Many years ago there was a community store but for the past ten or so years community members (and teachers) have to shop at Fitzroy Crossing or Broome. During the dry season it is possible to cross the river to Yungngora community Noonkanbah station and buy some food there. The Community Council has been investigating options for reopening a store for many years. The school supports the community in buying food and will take people to Fitzroy Crossing or to Noonkanbah when everyone runs out of food. All items are very expensive compared to major centres. When supplies run low the locals sometimes go to Noonkanbah, 50 km away, for essentials. During the wet season the community can be cut off by road for months at a time. The community has an all-weather airstrip located 4 km away. This allows an air drop of essential supplies when the need arises.

== Town planning ==
Kadjina Layout Plan No.1 has been prepared in accordance with State Planning Policy 3.2 Aboriginal Settlements. Layout Plan No.1 was endorsed by the community on 11 August 2009 and the Western Australian Planning Commission on 11 May 2010. The Layout Plan map-set and background report can be viewed at Planning Western Australia's website.
