= Yakanarra Community =

Community in Western Australia

Yakanarra
- Town
- Coordinates: 18.671°S 125.298°E
- Country: Australia
- State: Western Australia
- LGA: Shire of Derby-West Kimberley
- Location: 60 km (37 mi) south-west of Fitzroy Crossing, Western Australia

Government
  - State electorate: Kimberley
  - Federal division: Durack
- Postcode: 6765
- Mean max temp: 35.6 °C (96.1 °F)
- Mean min temp: 19.1 °C (66.4 °F)
- Annual rainfall: 541.2 mm (21.31 in)

Yakanarra is a small Aboriginal community approximately 60 kilometres south-west of Fitzroy Crossing in the Kimberley region of Western Australia, within the Shire of Derby-West Kimberley. Road access is via the Cherabun Road, which intersects the Great Northern Highway 57 km east of Fitzroy Crossing.

== History ==
The community was established in 1989 by Hanson and Laurel Boxer when the living area of Yakanarra was excised from the Gogo pastoral station. Many residents of Yakanarra have cultural and emotional ties to the old Cherrabun station, with the existing community located 20 kilometres (12 mi) south of the old homestead. Walmajarri is the primary language for Yakanarra.

== Education ==
Children of school age at Yakanarra attend the Yakanarra Community School, which was established in 1991. The school conducts classes from pre-school to year 10, and caters for approximately 30 primary students and 10 junior secondary students. Most of the school's funding is through the Aboriginal Independent Schools Association, which in turn is funded by the Commonwealth Grants Association.

== Governance ==
The community is managed through its incorporated body, Yakanarra Aboriginal Corporation, incorporated under the Aboriginal Councils and Associations Act 1976 on 22 November 1988.

== Town planning ==
Yakanarra Layout Plan No.1 was prepared in accordance with State Planning Policy 3.2 Aboriginal Settlements and was endorsed by the community in 2005 and the Western Australian Planning Commission in 2006. The layout plan map-set and background report can be viewed at Planning Western Australia's web site.
