= Kankawa Nagarra =

Australian Aboriginal singer-songwriter

- Also known as: Olive Knight
- Born: circa 1943; Kimberley (Western Australia)
- Instruments: Vocals, guitar

Kankawa Nagarra (born circa 1943), (also known as Olive Knight) is an Aboriginal Australian blues and gospel singer-songwriter and author. She sings in Walmajarri, Kimberley Creole and English. Her 2024 album Wirlmarni won the Australian Music Prize.

== Early life ==
Nagarra was born circa 1943 in Kimberley (Western Australia) She is a Gooniyandi and Walmatjarri elder.

At the age of 8, Nagarra was taken from her parents and sent to a mission in the Wangkatjungka Community. She is one of the Stolen Generations.

Nagarra discovered gospel, country, rock and blues music whilst working on homesteads via the radio.

Nagarra learned to play a cousin's guitar when she was in her 20s. She said, "At the time, there was a cultural thing, women weren't allowed to touch anything made of wood, we were forbidden to even go near the guitar, because it was a men's wooden instrument." Nagarra bought her first guitar at age 40.

== Performing career ==
In March 2011, Knight released Gospel Blues at the Edge of the Desert. She supported Hugh Jackman's Hugh Jackman: Back on Broadway concert residency from October 2011 to January 2012 in New York City. About the performance, Knight said "Singing on a Broadway stage backed by an 18-piece orchestra, visiting New York's blues and jazz clubs … security guards, private chauffeurs ... it was a dream. You have to pinch yourself."

In 2013, Knight released Kan-Kawa Contemporary Gospel & Blues.

In 2014, Knight received $12,500 via the Western Australia Regional Arts Fund; this provided Knight the opportunity to work with professional musicians at James Newhouse's studio. With the assistance of this funding, Knight recorded her third album Heroes & Laments: Walmatjarri Stories, which was released in April 2015.

In 2019, Nagarra toured the United States and Europe alongside Hugh Jackman again, as part of the production, The Man. The Music. The Show..

In December 2024, Nagarra won the 20th Australian Music Prize for Wirlmarni. Upon hearing this, she said "I dedicate this award to all my little Greats with a special mention to Tykrira Wilson who stands with me on the cover of the album. I love them all very much. They are my future ancestors."

== Personal life ==
In the 1960s, Nagarra assisted in the development of the Walmatjarri dictionary.

Nagarra is a Systems Awareness Teacher, human rights advocate and political activist.

Nagarra works to raise awareness about youth suicide and substance abuse within Aboriginal communities. She is the Founder of the term 'Ears of the Heart' and painter of the Map that describes the Project of the same name. 'Ears of the Heart' brings people together using both Indigenous Spiritual Wisdom with Systems Awareness our Inner Selves as Human beings with our responsibilities to each other and to 'Country'. Kankawa believes we must all listen with the intention to really 'hear' each other in new ways. This will be possible when we all learn and practice to move Ears from our Heads to our Hearts.

In 2016, Nagarra released the autobiography, The Bauhinia Tree: The Life of Kankawa Olive Knight.

She is honorifically known as "The Queen of The Bandaral Ngadu Delta".

== Discography ==
=== Albums ===
Title	Album details
Gospel Blues at the Edge of the Desert (as Olive Knight)	Released: March 2011; Format: digital download; Label: Desert Feet Records
Kan-Kawa Contemporary Gospel & Blues (as Olive Knight)	Released: November 2013; Format: digital download; Label: Desert Feet Records
Heroes & Laments: Walmatjarri Stories (as Olive Knight)	Released: April 2015; Format: CD, digital download; Label: Desert Feet Records
Wirlmarni	Released: August 2024; Format:CD, LP, digital download; Label: Flippin' Yeah Records

== Awards and nominations ==
=== Australian Music Prize ===
The Australian Music Prize (the AMP) is an annual award of $50,000 given to an Australian band or solo artist in recognition of the merit of an album released during the year of award. They commenced in 2005.

Year	Nominee / work	Award	Result	Ref.
2024	Wirlmarni	Australian Music Prize	Won	

=== Western Australia Women's Hall of Fame ===
Year	Nominee / work	Award	Result	Ref.
2024	Kankawa Nagarra	Western Australia Women's Hall of Fame	inducted	
