= 17 Mile Dam =

Dam in Western Australia

Seventeen Mile Dam
- Interactive map of Seventeen Mile Dam
- Country: Australia
- Location: Camballin, Western Australia
- Coordinates: 18°03′04″S 124°18′34″E
- Opening date: 1957
- Demolition date: 1983
- Owner: Public Works Department of Western Australia

Dam and spillways
- Impounds: Uralla Creek

Seventeen Mile Dam is a dam on the Uralla Creek in the north-west of Western Australia. It was constructed as part of the Camballin Irrigation Scheme by the Public Works Department of Western Australia in 1957. It was abandoned in 1983.

== History ==
The Seventeen Mile Dam was constructed in 1957 along with the Fitzroy River Barrage and numerous irrigation channels as part of the Camballin Irrigation Scheme in response to the feasibility of commercial rice production following a good crop from 32 ha in 1955 by the Northern Developments Pty. Ltd., a company incorporated in Sydney who in 1952 began small scale rice production in the area.

The Fitzroy River Barrage diverted water from the Fitzroy River to Uralla Creek which then flowed in the opposite direction of its natural flow, up to be stored in the artificial lake at Seventeen Mile Dam. The dam is particularly shallow and was designed to hold 5,400,000 cubic metres (190,000,000 cu ft) of water.

The dam was severely damaged by flood waters in January 1958 and again in January 1959. The consistent problems associated with flooding in the area plagued the scheme which damaged infrastructure and crops and led to its abandonment in 1983.

One employee died during a large flood after the boat he was in was swept over the spillway leaving the surviving employee to run the seventeen miles back to town to raise the alarm.
