= List of homesteads in Western Australia: N–O =

This list includes all homesteads in Western Australia with a gazetted name. It is complete with respect to the 1996 Gazetteer of Australia. Dubious names have been checked against the online 2004 data, and in all cases confirmed correct. However, if any homesteads have been gazetted or deleted since 1996, this list does not reflect these changes. Strictly speaking, Australian place names are gazetted in capital letters only; the names in this list have been converted to mixed case in accordance with normal capitalisation conventions.

| Name | Location | Remarks |
|---|---|---|
| Na-gillah | 33°56′S 115°12′E | |
| Nabaroo | 31°5′S 115°33′E | |
| Nalbarra | 28°39′S 117°36′E | |
| Nallan | 27°19′S 117°58′E | |
| Nambi | 28°24′S 121°41′E | |
| Nambung | 30°35′S 115°14′E | |
| Nammen | 30°54′S 115°35′E | |
| Nampup | 33°32′S 118°7′E | |
| Nanambinia | 32°40′S 123°35′E | |
| Nanamullen | 31°41′S 116°31′E | |
| Nanbrook | 31°20′S 115°40′E | |
| Nandoo Home | 33°20′S 115°47′E | |
| Nanga | 26°15′S 113°48′E | |
| Nangetty | 28°59′S 115°25′E | |
| Nangunia | 34°29′S 118°43′E | |
| Nanicup Bridge | 33°32′S 118°23′E | |
| Nanutarra | 22°32′S 115°30′E | |
| Nanyong Outcamp | 20°17′S 119°22′E | |
| Napier Downs | 17°20′S 124°49′E | |
| Napier Downs | 34°48′S 117°58′E | |
| Napier Hall | 34°50′S 117°57′E | |
| Naramella | 31°19′S 116°44′E | |
| Narbethong | 33°31′S 115°43′E | |
| Nardlah | 33°51′S 117°39′E | |
| Nardoo | 33°27′S 119°30′E | |
| Naree | 33°34′S 119°56′E | |
| Nargon | 33°59′S 115°4′E | |
| Nari | 29°50′S 116°29′E | |
| Nari Plains | 29°27′S 115°21′E | |
| Narkabunda | 29°2′S 114°49′E | |
| Narlee | 34°4′S 117°34′E | |
| Narloo | 27°51′S 116°15′E | |
| Narndee | 28°57′S 118°11′E | |
| Narpyn | 34°36′S 117°41′E | |
| Narracoopa Farms | 34°59′S 117°18′E | |
| Narracoota | 25°52′S 118°40′E | |
| Narranbee | 34°11′S 116°43′E | |
| Narrawong | 33°48′S 117°24′E | |
| Narrayarra | 29°35′S 115°44′E | |
| Narridy | 33°10′S 117°20′E | |
| Narweenah | 33°30′S 117°24′E | |
| Natta Outcamp | 26°48′S 113°49′E | |
| Naturaliste Downs | 33°36′S 115°3′E | |
| Naunenup Springs | 34°8′S 118°41′E | |
| Navan | 32°8′S 117°18′E | |
| Nedannco | 34°24′S 119°1′E | |
| Neds Corner | 33°39′S 120°57′E | |
| Neds Creek | 25°29′S 119°39′E | |
| Needreba | 32°39′S 116°52′E | |
| Neejoo | 34°33′S 117°36′E | |
| Neening | 31°22′S 118°7′E | |
| Neiliabublica | 18°6′S 125°50′E | |
| Neridup | 33°45′S 122°54′E | |
| Nerren Nerren | 27°8′S 114°38′E | |
| Nerrima | 18°29′S 124°24′E | |
| Nerrima Outcamp | 18°24′S 124°29′E | |
| Netherhill | 31°19′S 116°9′E | |
| Netley | 34°27′S 116°56′E | |
| Nettley | 33°51′S 117°50′E | |
| Neugin | 31°34′S 116°34′E | |
| Never Never | 33°22′S 119°48′E | |
| New Bicup | 33°59′S 116°25′E | |
| New England | 29°21′S 116°21′E | |
| New Forest | 27°22′S 115°39′E | |
| New Glendower | 33°39′S 117°22′E | |
| New Kerry | 33°48′S 115°8′E | |
| New Leyine | 31°38′S 116°37′E | |
| New River | 33°40′S 115°17′E | |
| New Springs | 25°49′S 120°0′E | |
| New Way | 34°5′S 118°39′E | |
| New York Farm | 31°32′S 116°23′E | |
| Newbury | 33°4′S 116°50′E | |
| Newdegate Agricultural Research Station | 33°7′S 118°50′E | |
| Newgain | 31°34′S 116°33′E | |
| Newhaven | 31°22′S 115°54′E | |
| Newlands | 33°57′S 117°32′E | |
| Newlands | 33°55′S 117°54′E | |
| Newlands | 34°41′S 117°58′E | |
| Newlands | 34°50′S 118°12′E | |
| Newlands | 33°48′S 115°6′E | |
| Newleigh | 33°44′S 120°56′E | |
| Newman | 33°43′S 121°35′E | |
| Newmarket | 32°53′S 116°31′E | |
| Newralia Stud | 33°28′S 115°37′E | |
| Newtoura | 34°38′S 116°17′E | |
| Newtown House | 33°40′S 115°15′E | |
| Neymerup | 33°40′S 117°4′E | |
| Ngandu | 33°18′S 121°24′E | |
| Ngaree | 32°50′S 117°49′E | |
| Ngawande | 33°35′S 117°46′E | |
| Ngopitchup | 33°57′S 117°21′E | |
| Nicholson | 18°2′S 128°54′E | |
| Nickling Brook | 34°17′S 118°57′E | |
| Nicklup | 33°5′S 115°56′E | |
| Niddrie | 28°36′S 114°52′E | |
| Nie | 31°42′S 116°44′E | |
| Nilemah | 26°25′S 114°3′E | |
| Niliamongup | 34°1′S 118°11′E | |
| Nimbedilling | 32°31′S 116°57′E | |
| Nimbuwah | 33°11′S 118°41′E | |
| Nimingarra | 20°31′S 119°55′E | |
| Ninarem | 33°46′S 117°28′E | |
| Ninego | 31°33′S 116°33′E | |
| Ningaloo | 22°42′S 113°40′E | |
| Ningbing | 15°15′S 128°41′E | |
| Ninghan | 29°25′S 117°17′E | |
| Nirranda | 31°8′S 116°12′E | |
| Nirvana | 33°8′S 119°7′E | |
| Nirvana | 33°53′S 117°13′E | |
| Nita Downs | 19°5′S 121°41′E | |
| No-ibla | 26°55′S 119°36′E | |
| No. 1 Outcamp | 23°45′S 114°23′E | |
| No. 1 Outcamp | 18°30′S 125°42′E | |
| No. 2 Outcamp | 18°27′S 125°46′E | |
| No. 2 Outcamp | 23°57′S 114°31′E | |
| No. 3 Outcamp | 18°29′S 125°49′E | |
| Nodoh Farm | 33°41′S 115°7′E | |
| Noogakyne | 31°41′S 116°48′E | |
| Noojee | 33°47′S 115°9′E | |
| Nookawarra | 26°18′S 116°53′E | |
| Noonaera | 32°5′S 127°56′E | Ruin |
| Noonamena | 32°16′S 118°3′E | |
| Noonda | 30°46′S 116°22′E | |
| Noondie | 27°7′S 117°7′E | |
| Noondine | 30°34′S 116°4′E | |
| Noondle | 30°41′S 115°42′E | |
| Noondoonia | 32°19′S 123°43′E | |
| Noongal | 28°8′S 116°50′E | |
| Noonijup | 34°25′S 117°24′E | |
| Noonkanbah | 18°30′S 124°50′E | |
| Noonoombah | 29°53′S 115°30′E | |
| Nooraglen | 33°37′S 119°35′E | |
| Nooramunga | 34°10′S 118°31′E | |
| Noreena Downs | 22°18′S 120°11′E | |
| Norfolk | 29°4′S 115°58′E | |
| Norie | 26°47′S 118°21′E | |
| Norla | 34°4′S 117°7′E | |
| Normanhurst | 31°29′S 116°30′E | |
| Norn Creek | 34°44′S 117°50′E | |
| Norring | 33°26′S 117°18′E | |
| North Bundaleer | 29°18′S 115°26′E | |
| North Bungaree | 33°46′S 121°47′E | |
| North Carlotta | 34°5′S 115°49′E | |
| North Gully | 28°43′S 114°59′E | |
| Northam Research Station | 31°43′S 116°42′E | |
| Northbourne | 31°59′S 116°53′E | |
| Northbrook | 33°25′S 116°43′E | |
| Northwich | 30°41′S 116°55′E | |
| Northwood | 34°57′S 117°55′E | |
| Norup | 34°31′S 117°10′E | |
| Norvic | 34°37′S 116°3′E | |
| Norwich Downs | 32°10′S 117°10′E | |
| Nowerkin | 31°56′S 117°2′E | |
| Nowhere Else | 34°16′S 118°56′E | |
| Nowra | 33°47′S 117°51′E | |
| Nuendah | 27°2′S 120°21′E | |
| Nukenulup | 34°34′S 117°28′E | |
| Nullawil | 33°32′S 117°27′E | |
| Nunagin | 33°23′S 117°43′E | |
| Nunawading | 30°30′S 116°26′E | |
| Nunkeri | 33°29′S 119°58′E | |
| Nunkerri | 31°21′S 116°14′E | |
| Nurragi | 33°42′S 120°32′E | |
| Nyamuttin | 32°39′S 117°18′E | |
| Nyanda Downs | 33°40′S 118°29′E | |
| Nyang | 23°2′S 115°2′E | |
| Nylon | 33°47′S 117°4′E | |
| Nymbur | 34°6′S 117°28′E | |
| Nyora Park | 33°34′S 115°54′E | |
| Oak Dale | 31°18′S 116°46′E | |
| Oak Farm | 33°51′S 117°25′E | |
| Oak Hill | 33°11′S 116°56′E | |
| Oak Valley | 31°2′S 116°41′E | |
| Oakbank | 33°52′S 117°54′E | |
| Oakdale | 34°1′S 118°13′E | |
| Oakdale | 32°34′S 116°48′E | |
| Oakdale | 33°39′S 115°59′E | |
| Oakdale | 34°25′S 119°1′E | |
| Oakdale | 33°59′S 118°49′E | |
| Oakdale Farms | 34°9′S 118°37′E | |
| Oakford | 32°50′S 115°53′E | |
| Oakhills | 32°25′S 116°36′E | |
| Oakhurst | 31°7′S 116°55′E | |
| Oakland | 33°39′S 116°13′E | |
| Oaklands | 29°28′S 116°8′E | |
| Oaklands | 32°18′S 116°38′E | |
| Oaklands | 31°35′S 116°32′E | |
| Oaklands | 33°46′S 117°6′E | |
| Oaklands | 34°41′S 117°50′E | |
| Oakleigh | 34°29′S 117°25′E | |
| Oakleigh | 33°42′S 115°16′E | |
| Oakleigh | 33°34′S 117°24′E | |
| Oakleigh | 31°24′S 116°48′E | |
| Oakley | 33°27′S 122°43′E | |
| Oakover | 33°19′S 117°0′E | |
| Oakover | 32°1′S 116°48′E | |
| Oakwood | 34°57′S 117°17′E | |
| Oakworth | 33°54′S 117°17′E | |
| Obanpark | 30°30′S 115°52′E | |
| Obawara | 29°16′S 114°59′E | |
| Ocean Valley | 33°47′S 115°1′E | |
| Oceanview Farms | 33°51′S 122°46′E | |
| Ocnay | 34°44′S 117°48′E | |
| Ocumup | 34°25′S 119°13′E | |
| Odessa | 31°17′S 116°8′E | |
| Oink N Baa | 33°51′S 122°6′E | |
| Okaparinga | 31°42′S 116°2′E | |
| Oklahoma | 33°41′S 115°11′E | |
| Old Beverley Springs | 16°35′S 125°29′E | |
| Old Cardawan Outcamp | 24°47′S 119°21′E | |
| Old Carnegie | 25°48′S 122°57′E | |
| Old Charnley | 16°35′S 125°23′E | |
| Old Cherrabun | 18°30′S 125°19′E | |
| Old Corunna Downs | 21°26′S 119°47′E | |
| Old Elvire | 18°23′S 127°58′E | |
| Old Erivilla | 25°7′S 117°11′E | |
| Old Flora Valley | 18°19′S 128°0′E | |
| Old Fossil Downs | 18°11′S 125°53′E | |
| Old Gidgee | 27°31′S 119°31′E | |
| Old Gnaraloo | 23°48′S 113°32′E | |
| Old Jerramungup | 33°55′S 118°58′E | |
| Old Kadji Kadji | 29°6′S 116°13′E | |
| Old Karara | 29°11′S 116°42′E | |
| Old Lamboo | 18°32′S 127°20′E | |
| Old Lochada | 29°12′S 116°33′E | |
| Old Pinjin | 30°13′S 122°32′E | Abandoned |
| Old Rectory | 33°58′S 116°7′E | |
| Old Tarwonga | 33°12′S 116°59′E | |
| Old Trilbar Outcamp | 25°55′S 118°6′E | |
| Old Urella | 29°6′S 115°23′E | |
| Old Warriedar | 29°8′S 116°57′E | |
| Old Woodleigh | 26°11′S 114°33′E | |
| Old Yarraquin | 27°26′S 117°58′E | |
| Oldfield River | 33°35′S 120°40′E | |
| Olimarena | 33°41′S 121°53′E | |
| Olinda | 34°21′S 117°4′E | |
| Olinda | 32°47′S 117°39′E | |
| One Tree Hill | 29°38′S 115°28′E | |
| Ongerup | 33°50′S 117°5′E | |
| Oobagooma | 16°46′S 123°59′E | |
| Oosha | 33°44′S 115°54′E | |
| Oralea | 32°16′S 116°33′E | |
| Orana | 34°8′S 118°53′E | |
| Orana | 29°45′S 116°10′E | |
| Orana Downs | 32°16′S 117°33′E | |
| Orandeen | 33°34′S 120°45′E | |
| Orange Grove | 33°59′S 116°5′E | |
| Orange Grove | 33°38′S 117°24′E | |
| Orange Springs | 31°2′S 115°38′E | |
| Orchid Downs | 33°34′S 120°36′E | |
| Ord Regeneration Depot | 17°22′S 128°54′E | |
| Orleans Farms | 33°45′S 122°51′E | |
| Orroroo | 34°40′S 118°32′E | |
| Orsola | 33°39′S 117°9′E | |
| Orup Downs | 34°32′S 117°36′E | |
| Otarra | 29°14′S 114°57′E | |
| Otley Park | 33°22′S 116°24′E | |
| Oudabunna | 29°4′S 117°45′E | |
| Over Ridge | 34°6′S 117°9′E | |
| Overall | 33°17′S 119°18′E | |
| Overington | 33°48′S 118°35′E | |
| Overland Park | 33°46′S 121°56′E | |
| Overndale | 32°32′S 117°58′E | |
| Overton Farm | 33°54′S 117°10′E | |
| Overyonda | 33°30′S 115°39′E | |
| Owen Dale | 34°2′S 118°13′E | |
| Oxbow | 31°43′S 116°30′E | |
| Oxonia | 33°34′S 117°55′E | |

== See also ==
- List of pastoral leases in Western Australia
