= Muludja =

Community in Western Australia

Coordinates: 18°10′S 125°46′E

Muludja Western Australia
- Postcode(s): 6765
- Elevation: 114 m (374 ft)
- Location: 20 km (12 mi) east of Fitzroy Crossing, Western Australia
- LGA(s): Shire of Derby-West Kimberley
- State electorate(s): Kimberley
- Federal division(s): Durack
Mean max temp	Mean min temp	Annual rainfall
35.96 °C; 97 °F	19.1 °C; 66 °F	541.2 mm 21.3 in

Muludja is a small Aboriginal community, located 20 km east of Fitzroy Crossing in the Kimberley region of Western Australia, within the Shire of Derby-West Kimberley.

== History ==
Muludja community was established as part of Fossil Downs Station and relocated to its present location in the early 1980s.

Thousands of hectares at nearby Gogo Station were burnt out in 2011 when a fire was deliberately lit at Muludja. A local man started the fire after an argument and while he was affected by alcohol; he was later arrested and charged with arson following a tip-off from the public.

== Native title ==
The community is located within the registered Gooniyandi Combined 2 (Federal Court File No. WAD6008/2000) native title claim area.

== Governance ==
The community is managed through its incorporated body, Jarlmadangah Burru Aboriginal Corporation, incorporated under the Aboriginal Councils and Associations Act 1976 on 3 December 1987.

== Town planning ==
Muludja Layout Plan No.1 has been prepared in accordance with State Planning Policy 3.2 Aboriginal Settlements. Layout Plan No.1 was endorsed by the community on 1 February 2002 and the Western Australian Planning Commission on 14 May 2002.
