= Walmadjari =

Indigenous Australian people of the Kimberley region of Western Australia

Tjiwaling, Wanaseka

Languages
- English (Australian English, Aboriginal Australian English); Walmajarri

Religion
- Australian Aboriginal religion

Related ethnic groups
- Gurindji, Ngarinman

The Walmadjari (Walmajarri) people, also known as Tjiwaling and Wanaseka, are an Aboriginal Australian people of the Kimberley region of Western Australia.

== Name ==
The two names reflect different Walmadjari preferences. Their western bands accept Tjiwaling as an ethnonym, as it is a designation peoples neighbouring them further west employ. The eastern bands prefer the Walmadjari autonym, or conversely, define themselves as the Wanaseka, as opposed to the Tjiwaling, side.

== Language ==
Walmadjari belongs to the Ngumpin–Yapa branch of the Pama-Nyungan language family.

== Country ==
Norman Tindale's estimation (Note: Tindale's estimates particularly for the peoples of the Western desert are not considered to be accurate.) assigned the Walmadjari roughly 15,000 square miles (39,000 km^{2}) of territory on the desert plateau south of the Fitzroy and Christmas Creek valleys and from Kunkadea (Noonkanbah), as far east as the Cummins Range. Their southern limits ran along the Canning Stock Route to Kardalapuru (Well 47). Sometime in the latter half of the 19th century, a group of Walmadjari, who are called Ngainan, took over some Gooniyandi territory, the downs north of Christmas Creek between Mellon Spring and Landrigan Cliffs.

== Alternative names ==
- Walmajari, Walmadjeri, Walmade're, Wolmadjari, Walmajeri, Wolmaijari
- Wulumari, Wolmeri, Wolmera
- Walmaharri, Walmaharry, Wolmaharry
- Warigari Pundur (Gugadja exonym signifying 'cannibals')
- Walmajai (Nyigina pronunciation)
- Wulumarai
- Wanmadjari
- Tjiwaling (Mangala exonym)
- Djualin
- Tjiwali
- Tjiwalindja, Djiwalinja
- Djuwali, Djiwalinj
- Ngadjukura (language name)
- Pitangu (pejorative Gugadja ethnonym)
- Wanaeka, Waneiga
- Ngainan, Nganang
- Warmala (generic term for several Western Desert tribes)

== Notable Walmadjari ==
- Ningali Lawford (1967–2019), actress
- Jimmy Pike (c.1940–2002), artist
- Mitch Torres (born 1964), actress, filmmaker, radio presenter, and writer
- Kankawa Nagarra (Olive Knight) (born 1943), musician

== Sources ==
- "AIATSIS map of Indigenous Australia". AIATSIS. 18 June 2021.
- "Tindale Tribal Boundaries" (PDF). Department of Aboriginal Affairs, Western Australia. September 2016. Archived from the original (PDF) on 8 March 2016.
- Tindale, Norman Barnett (1974). "Walmadjari (WA)". Aboriginal Tribes of Australia: Their Terrain, Environmental Controls, Distribution, Limits, and Proper Names. Australian National University. ISBN 978-0-708-10741-6. Archived from the original on 20 March 2020.
- Tonkinson, Robert (1989). "Local Organisation and Land Tenure in the Karlamilyi (Rudall River) Region" (PDF). In Western Desert Working Group (ed.). The significance of the Karlamilyi Region to the Martujarra people of the Western Desert. Perth: Department of Conservation and Land Management. pp. 99–259.
