= Laura River (Western Australia) =

River in Western Australia

Coordinates: 18°41′43″S 127°01′06″E

Location
- Country: Australia

Physical characteristics
- Source
  - location: Bailey Range
  - elevation: 409 metres (1,342 ft)
- Mouth
  - location: Mary River
  - elevation: 287 metres (942 ft)
- Length: 86 km (53 mi)

The Laura River is a river in the east Kimberley region of Western Australia.

The headwaters of the river rise in the Bailey Range, approximately 20 km south of Halls Creek; the river then flows in a south-westerly direction crossing the Great Northern Highway near Dillinger Bore before discharging into the Mary River of which it is a tributary.

The river was named in 1884 by government surveyor George Russell Turner, of the 1884 Kimberley Survey Expedition, who possibly named it after Laura Eliza Frances Forrest (1877–1960), the niece of Surveyor General John Forrest.
