= Fitzroy River Barrage (Western Australia) =

Dam structure in Western Australia

The Fitzroy River Barrage is a dam type structure built as part of the Camballin Irrigation Scheme in Western Australia.

It was a series of collapsible shutters which were designed to collapse when the river level was approximately twelve inches over the shutters. The structure was intended to divert the water in the Fitzroy River to be stored in the Seventeen Mile Dam, by flowing up Uralla Creek, unnaturally in the opposite direction.

The barrage was built by the Public Works Department of Western Australia and was designed to hold 4.58 x 106 cubic metres of water.

A small village was erected at the barrage site during the construction phase. Presently there is still the superstructure remaining along with the stilted shed which was used as a machinery shed. The Department of Water currently still maintains a small shed on the site for its stream gauging equipment.
