= Cherrabun =

Pastoral lease in Western Australia

Coordinates: 18.913°S 125.525°E

Location in Western Australia

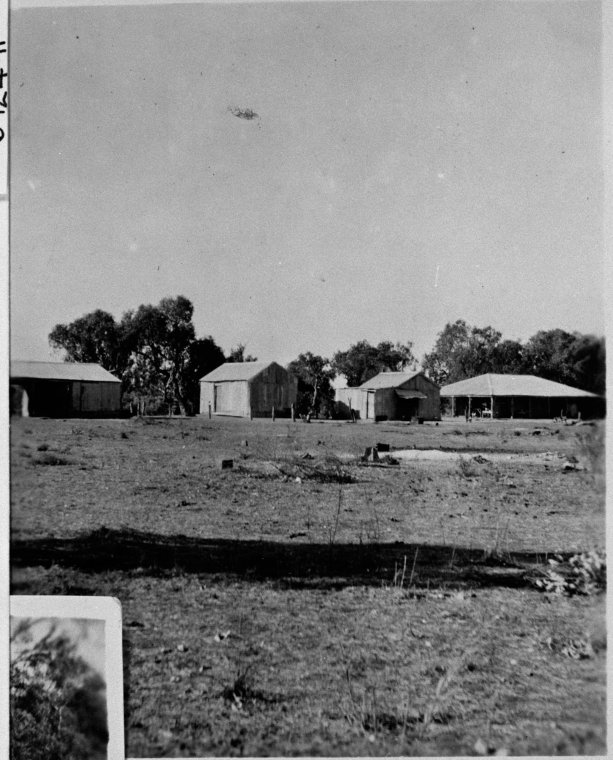
Cherrabun Homestead ca.1915

Cherrabun or Cherrabun Station is a pastoral lease that once operated as a sheep station but presently operates as a cattle station in Western Australia.

It is situated about 68 kilometres (42 mi) south of the Bayulu Community and about 238 kilometres (148 mi) west of Halls Creek in the Kimberley region.

Cherrabun was formed when Gogo Station was carved up into three separate properties, Cherrabun, Margaret Downs (known as Gogo) and Christmas Creek. This followed a revision of the Land Act in 1911 restricting holdings to a size of one million acres. Gogo was owned by the Emanuel brothers, who also owned Meda Station.

The area was struck by drought between 1951 and 1953, with the number of cattle being reduced by half. This was the first drought suffered by pastoralists in 70 years, with many hurriedly sinking bores and buying feed to keep their stock alive. Other nearby properties that were affected included Noonkanbah, Liveringa, Quandan, Gogo, Glenroy, Fossil Downs, Luiligui, Christmas Creek and Bohemia Downs Station.

The Walmatjarri artist Jimmy Pike lived as a fringe-dweller around Cherrabun in the 1950s; he eventually joined relatives at the station camp and worked as a stockman.

== See also ==
- List of ranches and stations
- List of pastoral leases in Western Australia
