= Mary River (Western Australia) =

River in Western Australia

Coordinates: 18°43′19″S 126°50′14″E

Location
- Country: Australia

Physical characteristics
- Source
  - location: Mount Angelo
  - elevation: 465 metres (1,526 ft)
- Mouth
  - location: Margaret River
  - elevation: 254 metres (833 ft)
- Length: 100 km (62 mi)

The Mary River is a river in the Kimberley region of Western Australia.

The headwaters of the river rise south of Mount Angelo, approximately 25 km south of Halls Creek. The river then flows in a westerly direction through Oollumarra Soak and discharges into Margaret River, of which it is a tributary.

Mary River has nine tributaries, including the Laura River, Willy Willy Creek, Garden Creek, Hangman Creek and Janet Creek.

The river was named in 1884 when the area was explored by a government survey party led by Harry Johnston, who named it after his mother, Mary Johnston (1822–1893), a daughter of Marshall Waller Clifton and Elinor Bell.

The traditional owners of the areas around the river are the Djaru and Konejandi peoples.
