= Mornington Station =

Defunct pastoral lease in Western Australia

Coordinates: 17°30′38″S 126°06′33″E

Location in Western Australia

Mornington Station was a beef cattle station in the Kimberley region of north-west Western Australia. It was bought by the Australian Wildlife Conservancy in 2001 and became the Mornington Sanctuary nature reserve.

== History ==
Mornington was originally run as a beef cattle station for 80 years and was named after Victoria's Mornington Peninsula by Bob Maxted.

The station was once owned by Sir Sidney Kidman, who had abandoned both Mornington and Glenroy Stations in 1936 as a result of Indigenous Australians spearing his cattle and the difficulty in driving his cattle to Derby.

== See also ==
- List of ranches and stations
