= Jimmy Pike =

Australian Aboriginal artist

- Born: Kurnti Kujarra c. 1940 east of Japingka, Western Australia
- Died: November 3, 2002 (aged 61–62); Derby, Western Australia
- Education: Fremantle Prison
- Known for: Painting, print making, publishing
- Spouse: Pat Lowe
- Website: www.jimmypiketrust.org.au

Jimmy Pike (c.1940 – 3 November 2002) was a Walmatjarri Aboriginal artist.

== Early life ==
Jimmy Pike was born around 1940 east of Japingka, an important jila or permanent waterhole in the Great Sandy Desert, and grew up as a hunter-gatherer. Like many of his people he drifted north toward the river valleys and the sheep and cattle stations where food was more plentiful. Living as a fringe-dweller around Cherrabun Station, he eventually joined relatives at the station camp and worked as a stockman. He was named Jimmy Pike, after Phar Lap's jockey, by a cattle station manager.

== Career ==
Pike learned to use western art materials while in Fremantle Prison. Even before he was released from prison his work was exhibited in major Australian galleries.

In 1989 Pike featured in a documentary The Quest of Jimmy Pike.

He illustrated a book Jimmy and Pat meet the Queen with his wife Pat Lowe. Pike has collaborated on a number of other books with his wife.

He held exhibitions in United Kingdom, Philippines, China, Namibia, and Italy. During a solo exhibition of his paintings at the Rebecca Hossack Gallery London in 1998, Pike and his wife Pat Lowe attended a garden party at Buckingham Palace.

He held a joint exhibition with Zhou Xiaoping in the National Gallery of China in Beijing, called "Through the Eyes of Two Cultures". He was the first Australian painter to show there.

Pike died from a heart attack on 3 November 2002 in Derby, Western Australia.

== Individual exhibitions ==
- 1985 Aboriginal Artists Gallery, Melbourne
- 1986 Aboriginal Artists Gallery, Sydney
- 1986 Black Swan Gallery, Fremantle
- 1987 Ben Grady Gallery, Canberra
- 1987 Tynte Gallery, Adelaide
- 1987 Craft Centre Gallery, Sydney
- 1987 Seibu Shibuya, Tokyo
- 1988 Birukmarri Gallery, Fremantle
- 1988 Capricorn Gallery, Port Douglas
- 1988 Tynte Gallery, Adelaide
- 1988 Blaxland Gallery, Sydney and Melbourne
- 1991 Rebecca Hossack Gallery, London
- 2000 Museo d'arte contemporanea AM International Bivongi, provincia di Reggio Calabria, Italy
- 2000 Museo dell'Aeronautica G. Caproni, Trento, Italy

== Group exhibitions ==
- 1984 Her Majesty's Theatre, Perth
- 1985 Contemporary Aboriginal Art, Praxis, Fremantle
- 1987 Print Council Gallery, Melbourne
- 1987 Recent Aboriginal Art of WA, National Gallery of Australia, Canberra
- 1987 The Fourth National Aboriginal Art Award Exhibition, Museum and Art Gallery of the NT, Darwin
- 1987 Galerie Exler, Frankfurt
- 1987 Art and Aboriginality, Aspex Gallery, Portsmouth, UK
- 1988 Addendum Gallery, Fremantle
- 1998 Australian Aboriginal Graphics from the Collection of the Flinders University Art Museum
- 1989, Prints by Seven Australian Aboriginal Artists, International Touring Exhibition through the Print Council and Department of Foreign Affairs & Trade
- 1998 Aboriginal Art. The Continuing Tradition, National Gallery of Australia, Canberra
- 1990 i'ete Australien a' Montpellier, Musee Fabre Gallery, Montpeliler, France
- 1990 Balance 1990, Views, Visions, Influences, Queensland Art Gallery, Brisbane
- 1990 Contemporary Aboriginal Art from the Robert Holmes a Court Collection, Harvard University, University of Minnesota, Lake Oswego Centre for the Arts, USA
- 1990 Tagari Lia My Family, Contemporary Aboriginal Art from Australia, Third Eye Centre, Glasgow, UK
- 1991 Flash Pictures, National Gallery of Australia
- 1991 The Eighth National Aboriginal Art Award Exhibition, Museum and Art Gallery of the Northern Territory, DarwinV 1992 Working in the Round, Flinders University Art Museum, Adelaide
- 1992 Crossroads - Towards a New Reality, Aboriginal Art from Australia, National Museums of Art, Kyoto and Tokyo
- 1992 The Ninth National Aboriginal Art Award Exhibition, Museum and Art Gallery of the Northern Territory, Darwin
- 1992 Kimberley Creations, Broome WA
- 1992/3 New Tracks Old Land: An Exhibition of Contemporary Prints from Aboriginal Australia, Touring USA and Australia
- 1993 The Tenth National Aboriginal Art Award Exhibition, Museum and Art Gallery of the Northern Territory, Darwin
- 1993 Galerie im Vinyard Berlin
- 1994 New Tracks Old Land Touring USA
- 1994 Contemporary Visions Melbourne
- 1994 Artmove Claremont
- 1995 Art Gallery of WA, Major Retrospective
- 1996 NATSI Art Award NTMG Darwin
- 1996 Friendship Gallery Hefei, People's Republic of China
- 1997 Durack Gallery Broome
- 1997 Fireworks Gallery Brisbane
- 1997 Framed Gallery Darwin
- 1998 Rebecca Hossack Gallery London
- 1999 "Through the eyes of two cultures", National Gallery of China, Beijing
- 1999 NATSI Art Award NTMG Darwin
- 2000 Japingka Gallery Perth

== Collections ==
- Australian Museum, Sydney
- Art Gallery of New South Wales, Sydney
- Art Gallery of South Australia, Adelaide
- Art Gallery of Western Australia, Perth
- Flinders University Art Museum, Adelaide
- Gold Coast City Art Gallery, Surfers Paradise
- Museum and Art Gallery of the Northern Territory, Darwin
- Museum Victoria, Melbourne
- National Gallery of Australia, Canberra
- National Gallery of Victoria, Melbourne
- National Maritime Museum, Darling Harbour, Sydney
- Parliament House Art Collection, Canberra
- Queensland Art Gallery, Brisbane
- Queensland University of Technology Collection
- Queensland Museum
- The Holmes a Court Collection, Perth
- BHP Collection
- Christensen fund Collection
- Oodgeroo Collection
