= Glenroy Station =

Pastoral lease in Western Australia

Coordinates: 17.357°S 126.11°E

Location in Western Australia

Glenroy Station is a pastoral lease that operates as a cattle station in Western Australia.

It is situated approximately 110 km (68 mi) north of Fitzroy Crossing and 260 km (162 mi) east of Derby in the Kimberley region.

== History ==
The property was established in the early 1900s by Arthur Blythe and Reginald Nash Spong. The Blythe family had been active in the West Kimberley since 1885. The family owned Brooking Creek Station on the Fitzroy River and Arthur's father, Joseph Blythe, later established Mount House Station.

Together Mount House and Glenroy occupy an area of 5,059 km^{2} (1,953 sq mi) and can carry approximately 20,000 head of cattle.

Blythe sold his share of the property to Jabez Pearson Orchard in about 1912. In 1916, Sidney Kidman invested in Glenroy with Spong and Orchard, forming the Glenroy Pastoral Company. This was Kidman's first investment in the West Kimberley.

In 1919, in a remarkable feat of droving, 300 horses were overlanded over 2,000 mi (3,218.7 km) from Kapunda to Fossil Downs and Glenroy. Only 26 horses were lost on the journey but one stockman was drowned at Caroline Pool on the last stages.

Kidman abandoned both Glenroy and Mornington Station in 1936 as a result of Aboriginal Australians spearing his cattle and the difficulty in driving his cattle to Derby.

Gordon Blythe initiated the Air Beef Scheme in the late 1940s to send beef to market from Mount House Station and Glenroy. An abattoir was constructed at Glenroy in 1948 to send beef by air to Wyndham and Derby. The business faced completion from road trains in 1953 and the abattoir was closed in 1964 and nearly completely destroyed by fire in 1966.

The area was struck by drought between 1951 and 1953, with the number of cattle being reduced by half. This was the first drought suffered by pastoralists in 70 years, with many hurriedly sinking bores and buying feed to keep their stock alive. Other nearby properties that were affected in Noonkanbah, Liveringa, Quandan, Gogo, Cherrabun, Fossil Downs, Luiligui, Christmas Creek and Bohemia Downs Station.

== See also ==
- List of ranches and stations
- List of pastoral leases in Western Australia
