= Donald MacDonald (pastoralist) =

Australian pastoralist (1857–1937)

Donald MacDonald mostly known as Dan MacDonald (1857 – 9 March 1937) was a prominent Australian pastoralist.

== Early life ==
MacDonald was born at Bradley in Laggan in New South Wales and was the fourth child of Scottish immigrant Donald MacDonald.

The MacDonald and MacKenzie families had read about the Alexander Forrest descriptions of lands in the Kimberley region of Western Australia that would be open for leasehold. MacDonald had already arrived in Western Australia by 1879 when his father wrote to ask to explore the area. The younger MacDonald did as asked, then applied for a 100 square miles (259 km^{2}) selection at the junction of the Margaret River and Fitzroy River, that later became part of Fossil Downs Station.

== Career ==
MacDonald began to establish the station and waited for his brothers, Charles and William, to arrive with the stock they were droving from Goulburn. The brothers eventually arrived with the stock in 1886. Once arrived the MacDonalds and MacKenzies worked to build the property and cattle numbers soon increased. The MacKenzies sold their interest to the MacDonalds in the early 1900s, Charles MacDonald died in 1903 and then William died in 1910 leaving Dan with sole ownership of the property. The station prospered and MacDonald expanded the holding and introduced Red Poll cattle into the Shorthorn herd. Sidney Kidman acquired a stake in the 1920s but by 1928 MacDonald bought him out and had full ownership again. By 1931 his son, William MacDonald, became a partner.

MacDonald retired to Goulburn in the early 1930s and continued to visit Fossil Downs until poor health forced him to stop travelling in 1935. He died at his home in Goulburn in 1937.
