= Camballin Irrigation Scheme =

Scheme in Western Australia between 1950s and 1980s

Coordinates: 17.991°S 124.194°E

The Camballin Irrigation Scheme consisted of the Fitzroy River Barrage, the Seventeen Mile Dam, Company Pump, numerous irrigation channels, a seventeen kilometre levee bank, silos for grain storage which were built at the Broome Jetty and other support infrastructure located at the Camballin townsite.

The scheme was implemented to provide a large scale rice growing venture. Fodder crops, Sorghum, oats and cotton were also trialled. The scheme was plagued by problems associated with flooding which damaged infrastructure and crops and was abandoned in 1983.
