= Air Beef Scheme =

Defunct airlines of Australia

After World War II, pastoralists from the Western Australian Kimberley region sought to develop the local beef export industry by encouraging infrastructure development there. Three brothers, Gordon, Douglas and Keith Blythe who owned and operated several pastoral leases in the east Kimberley devised an Air Beef Scheme (also known as the Glenroy Air Beef Scheme) by which a meatworks including an abattoir, carcase freezing facilities and an aerodrome were built at the remote Glenroy Station on the Mount House lease, about 100 kilometres (62 mi) east of Imintji Aboriginal Community near Derby. The scheme operated successfully from 1949 to 1965 and was important for the economic development of the towns of Wyndham and Derby as well as the development of the Kimberley pastoral industry generally.

Beef cattle were brought in from a 160-kilometre (100 mi) radius around the east Kimberley to be slaughtered, quartered, boned and chilled overnight, and the following day air shipments were made to Wyndham, a 290-kilometre (180 mi), 75-minute flight away using Bristol Freighter and Douglas DC-3 aircraft. The beef was frozen at Wyndham and then shipped to the United Kingdom.

Gordon Blythe had convinced MacRobertson Miller Airlines (MMA) to do a trial air shipment in May 1947 when four carcasses were slaughtered and left at the station at 2am, arriving in Perth in good condition at 3pm the same day. The trial being considered a success, a company Air Beef Ltd was established as a joint venture between the Blythes, MMA and Australian National Airways (ANA), with each party putting up one quarter of the capital and the Western Australian Government (through the North West Development and Advisory Committee, which was headed by Russell Dumas), assisting and providing a loan for the remaining quarter. It was hoped that the scheme would spawn a network of inland abattoirs throughout northern Australia, however this did not eventuate; plans for a similar facility at Fitzroy Crossing were shelved.

The plant had a capacity of 300 head of cattle per week and in an average season (May to September) would process about 4,000 head per year.

In 1949 the Commonwealth Government passed the "State Grants (Encouragement of Beef Production) Act 1949" which allowed funding for the construction of roads and other infrastructure to support the beef industry, as it was accepted by that time that airfreighting was going to be uneconomic in the long term. By 1953 the southern section of the Gibb River Road to Derby was completed and the first live shipment of cattle by truck from the east Kimberley was made. The Derby Meat Company (DEMCO, "Derby Meats") was established by the Blythes and others in 1959 and from then the airshipments were made to the closer destination of Derby. The construction of the road and the completion of slaughtering facilities at DEMCO in 1965 spelt the demise of the scheme and the abattoir was closed in the same year.
