= Fossil Downs Station =

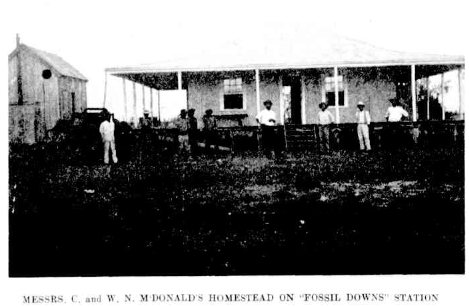
- Homestead at Fossil Downs Station, 1902

- Location within Western Australia

General information
- Type: Station
- Location: 50 kilometres (31 mi) North East of Fitzroy Crossing, Western Australia
- Coordinates: 18°8′19.8″S 125°46′31.6″E

Western Australia Heritage Register
- Designated: 26 February 1999
- Reference no.: 697

Fossil Downs Station is a pastoral lease and cattle station located about 50 kilometres (31 mi) north east of Fitzroy Crossing in the Kimberley region of Western Australia.

== History ==
The first Europeans to visit the area were part of Alexander Forrest's party who passed through in 1879, followed by Charles Hall in 1885. Hall later struck gold at Halls Creek. The station was established the following year when cattle arrived from the eastern states to stock the lease. The lease had been issued in 1883 to Dan MacDonald for the MacDonald family, who were living in Cliffords Creek, New South Wales at the time. He applied for an area of 100 square miles (259 km^{2}) at the junction of the Margaret and Fitzroy Rivers.

The MacDonalds, together with the McKenzie family from the junction near Tuena, who were close friends and related through marriage to the MacDonalds, formed a partnership to stock and equip the station in Western Australia. The McKenzies paid the £25 for the first year's rent and the families departed their New South Wales properties in March 1883. Donald MacDonald died early on the journey after being thrown from a horse, leaving two of his sons, Charles and William, to drive the stock 5,600 kilometres (3,480 mi) to the new property. They left with 700 head of cattle and 60 horses, encountering drought conditions as they trekked through Queensland. Arriving at the property in June 1886 with 327 cattle and 13 horses, the brothers reunited with Dan and set up camp. This is thought to be the longest overland cattle drove in Australia's history.

The gold rush at Halls Creek provided a nearby market for beef so the MacDonald brothers continued to run the property while the McKenzies financed the operating costs. In c. 1900, the McKenzies sold their stake to the MacDonalds. Charles MacDonald died in 1903 and William in 1910, leaving the property to Dan MacDonald. The station prospered and MacDonald expanded by taking over the leases of surrounding properties and also began to strengthen his stock by infusing Red Poll cattle into the Shorthorn herd.

The station was exporting some 1,500 head annually to Java via Derby by 1915.

In the early 1920s, despite the drought of 1924 and problems with cattle ticks, pastoralists in the area continued to prosper with the opening of an abattoir in Wyndham and the establishment of a stock route from Wyndham to the central Kimberley.

Cattle king Sidney Kidman bought a half share in Fossil Downs in the 1920s for £75,000, which Dan MacDonald bought back in 1928 with the help of his brother Duncan, making him sole owner of the property again. Dan MacDonald's son William bought into the property in 1931 and when his father died in 1939, William assumed control of Fossil Downs. A trained architect, William demolished the old wood and iron homestead that had suffered termite damage and designed a new homestead to be constructed some 14 kilometres (9 mi) away from the old one, for his new bride Maxine.

By the early 1950s the station's size was estimated at 1,000,000 acres (4,047 km^{2}) and had over 20,000 branded cattle with 20 white staff and 60 Aboriginal employees.

In 1952(?) at Fossil Downs Homestead, Preston Walker of United Aborigines Mission Fitzroy Crossing married the head stockman and his bride, a nursing sister from Darwin.

A large proportion of the West Kimberley was afflicted by drought in 1952 and 1953, including Fossil Downs. Virtually all feed was lost and even many native trees started dying as a result of intense heat and lack of water. The number of cattle in the area was reduced by half. This was the first drought suffered by pastoralists in 70 years, with many hurriedly sinking bores and buying feed to keep their stock alive. Other nearby properties that were affected were Noonkanbah, Liveringa, Quandan, Gogo, Glenroy, Cherrabun, Luiluigui, Christmas Creek and Bohemia Downs Station.

The remote Muludja community is located on the station 2.7 kilometres (1.7 mi) from the homestead, but on the other side of the river. The community was originally situated nearer the homestead but was moved in the 1990s and has a population of approximately 100 people, all of whom are of Aboriginal descent.

The station's name is derived from fossilised animals and plants that are found in the many limestone outcrops, the Gogo Formation, in the area.

While many stations in the Kimberley have experienced a decline in native pastures, mostly from overgrazing, Fossil Downs has bucked the trend thanks to years of collecting seed by hand from good pastures and spreading them over the rest of the property as well as rotational grazing. The return of mulla mulla in feed, with its high protein content is good for cattle and also good for the environment with its ability to stabilize soil.

The lessee in 2012 was WNM MacDonald Pty Ltd; Fossil Downs is operating under the Crown Lease number CL126-1989 and has the Land Act number LA3114/1248.

In 2015 Gina Rinehart acquired Fossil Downs after it was placed on the market for the first time in 133 years. The 4,000-square-kilometre (1,544 sq mi) property was stocked with 15,000 head of cattle and the sale price was not disclosed, but estimated to be between A$25 and 30 million.

== See also ==
- List of ranches and stations
- List of pastoral leases in Western Australia
