= Moola Bulla =

Pastoral lease in Western Australia

Coordinates: 18.188°S 127.499°E

Location in Western Australia

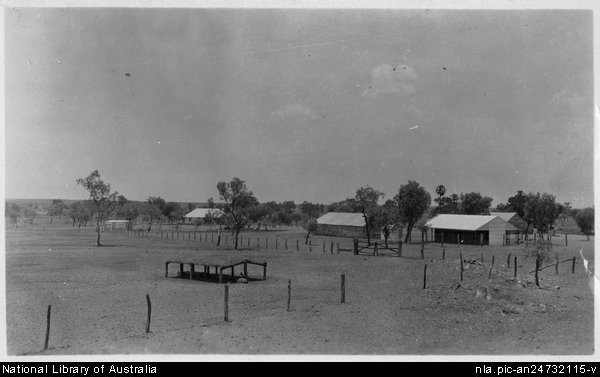
Moola Bulla ca. 1951

Moola Bulla Station is a pastoral lease that operates as a cattle station in the Kimberley region of Western Australia. It is approximately 20 kilometres (12 mi) west of Halls Creek and 150 kilometres (93 mi) south of Warmun, and occupies an area of 6,600 square kilometres (2,548 sq mi). It bisects the watershed of the Fitzroy River and Ord Rivers.

Moola Bulla was established in 1910 as a government-run station for the punishment of Aboriginal people, and remains an area that indigenous peoples avoid. With increasingly bloody conflict between Aborigines and pastoralists, it was hoped that opening a ration station would reduce the need for Aborigines to kill livestock for food, and that they could instead be trained for work on other cattle stations. The station was acquired for £18,061, and a manager and staff were appointed. The station was proclaimed a reserve and used as a camping ground for the local Aboriginal peoples, who were free to come and go as they pleased. The property's name is Aboriginal [which language?] for meat plenty.

By 1912, the property carried a herd of approximately 12,000 head of cattle, and the following year turned off 650 head and slaughtered 400 head for their own consumption. In 1916, it occupied an area of 2,000 square miles (5,180 km^{2}), about 50 miles (80 km) long and 40 miles (64 km) wide.

The homestead was stocked with 13,000 head of cattle and 500 head of horses in 1916. In 1917 the property recorded over 20 inches (508 mm) rain, far above the average of the previous few years and guaranteeing a good next season.

By 1920 the property occupied an area of 6,475 square kilometres (2,500 sq mi) and was stocked with 14,000 cattle. Employees of the station numbered close to 260, of which seven were of European descent. Aboriginal people such as young artist Daisy Andrews and her family, originally from the Walmajarri desert tribe, were sent to work at the station by authorities to prevent them from returning to their former tribal lands.

In 1955, the state government sold the station to Queensland pastoralist Allan Goldman for £100,000. When Goldman bought Moola Bulla station, its 200 Aboriginal residents were given 24 hours to leave, and Moola Bulla sent truckloads of them to United Aborigines Mission at Fitzroy Crossing. Goldman sold the station two years later, for £150,000, to a syndicate of investors including Northern Territory grazier H. J. Mortimer.

Peter Camm had been poised to buy the station, but the deal fell through when he was charged with cattle theft. The property was then acquired in 2001 by a syndicate of investors, including Andrew Cranswick, for A$18 million. In 2006, the syndicate sold it to agribusiness company Great Southern Group for an estimated A$30 million.

Following Great Southern Group's 2009 collapse, Moola Bulla was sold in 2010 to its former part-owner, the South African Western Australian Pastoral Company (also owner of Beefwood Park) for A$20 million, with 25,000 head of cattle.

In December 2014, the pastoral lease, along with Mt. Amhurst, Beefwood Park and Shamrock Stations, was to become part of Gina Rinehart's Liveringa Station Beef company, pending approval of higher stock numbers by the Western Australian Pastoral Board. However, the deal fell through.

In November 2016, the pastoral lease, along with Mt. Amhurst, Beefwood Park and Shamrock Stations, was sold to Consolidated Australian Pastoral Holdings (CAPH).

== See also ==
- List of ranches and stations
- List of pastoral leases in Western Australia
- List of the largest stations in Australia
