= Walmajarri language =

Australian Aboriginal language

Walmajarri
- Region: Western Australia
- Ethnicity: Walmadjari
- Native speakers: 291 (2021 census)
- Language family: Pama–Nyungan: Ngumpin–Yapa; Ngumpin; Walmajarri
- Dialects: Walmatjarri; Djuwarliny (Tjuwalinj); Pililuna

Language codes
- ISO 639-3: wmt
- Glottolog: walm1241
- AIATSIS: A66
- ELP: Walmajarri
- Djuwarliny

Walmajarri (many other names; see below) is a Pama–Nyungan language spoken in the Kimberley region of Western Australia by the Walmadjari and related peoples.

Walmajarri is declared a definitely endangered language by UNESCO based on their scale of Language Vitality and Endangerment.

== Names ==
Names for this language break down along the three dialects:

- Walmajarri, Walmatjarri, Walmatjari, Walmadjari, Walmatjiri, Walmajiri, Walmatjeri, Walmadjeri, Walmadyeri, Walmaharri, Wolmeri, Wolmera, Wulmari
- Bililuna, Pililuna
- Jiwarliny, Juwaliny, Tjiwaling, Tjiwarlin

== Speakers ==
Communities with a Walmajarri population are:

- Bayulu
- Djugerari (Cherrabun)
- Junjuwa (Fitzroy Crossing)
- Looma
- Kadjina (Millijidee)
- Mindibungu (Bililuna)
- Mindi Rardi (Fitzroy Crossing)
- Mulan
- Ngumpan
- Wangkajungka (Christmas Creek)
- Yakanarra
- Yungngora

The Walmajarri people used to live in the Great Sandy Desert. The effects of colonialism took them to the cattle stations, towns and missions in the North and scattered them over a wide area. The geographical distance accounts for the fact that there are several dialects, which have been further polarised by the lack of contact and further influenced by neighbouring languages.

== Documentartion ==
Some resources of the language spoken can be found in various archives or databases, such as the Pacific and Regional Archive for Digital Sources in Endangered Cultures (PARADISEC) catalogue.

== Phonology ==
=== Vowels ===
	Front	Back
High	i iː	u uː
Low	a aː	

=== Consonants ===
	Peripheral		Laminal	Apical	
	Bilabial	Velar	Palatal	Alveolar	Retroflex
Plosive	p	k	c	t	ʈ
Nasal	m	ŋ	ɲ	n	ɳ
Lateral			ʎ	l	ɭ
Rhotic				r	
Approximant	w		j		ɻ

Consonants are allowed as the final sound of a word in most cases.

== Morphology ==
Walmajarri is a suffixing language with many english words, especially copula having equivalent Walmajarri words.

=== Pronouns ===
	Singular	Dual	Plural
1st Exclusive		ngalijarra (we)	ngalimpa (we)
1st Inclusive	ngaju (I)	ngajarra (we)	ngamampa~nganimpa (we)
2nd Person	nyuntu (you)	nyurrajarra (y'all)	nyrurawarnti (y'all)
3rd Person	nyantu (he/she/it)	nyantujarra (them)	nyantuwarnti (they)

=== Number ===
In Walmajarri has three types of grammatical number: singular, dual, and plural.

Walmajarri	English
parri	boy
parrijara	two boys
parriawrnti	[3 or more] boys

=== Prepositions ===
Walmajarri	English
-nga	at, on, in
-jangka, -ngurni	from
-karti	to
-wu	for
-nga	with

=== Descriptive Nouns ===
Walmajarri	English
-mulu	without
-jarti	with, having, in possession of
-juwal	always, tends to
-jiliny	similar, like
-warlany	another

=== Tenses ===
Past	-i
Present	-a
Habitual	-any
Future	-ku

== Syntax ==
Warlmajarri has four syntactic cases: nominative, ergative, dative and assessory case. The cases assign different meanings to the noun phrases of a sentence. Therefore, the word order can vary quite freely. Subject, Object or Verb can appear initial, final, medial in sentence.

However, the second position of a sentence is always reserved for the Verbal Auxiliary. Sometimes referred to as a Catalyst, the Verbal Auxiliary indicates the mood of a sentence (similar to the English auxiliaries), but also cross-references its noun phrases. The person and number of the noun phrases in their syntactic cases are shown in the Verbal Auxiliary.

== Vocabulary ==
Below is a basic vocabulary list from Blake (1981).

English	Walmatjari
man	piyirn
woman	marnin
mother	ngamatyi
father	ngarpu
head	tyurlu
eye	mil
nose	punul
ear	pina
mouth	lirra
tongue	tyalany
tooth	katiti
hand	kurrapa
breast	ngamarna
stomach	munta
urine	kumpu
faeces	kura
thigh	kantyi
foot	tyina
bone	kampukampu
blood	nungu
dog	kunyarr
snake	tyilpirtityarti
kangaroo	marlu
possum	tyampiyirnti
fish	kapi
spider	purlkartu
mosquito	kiwiny
emu	karnangantya
eaglehawk	wamulu
crow	waangkarna
sun	purangu
moon	yakarn
star	wirl
stone	pamarr
water	ngapa
camp	ngurra
fire	warlu
smoke	nguntyurr
food	miyi
meat	kuyi
stand	karri
sit	kirrantya
see	nyaka
go	yanta
get	warnta
hit, kill	pungka
I	ngatyu
you	nyuntu
one	layi
two	kurriny

== Sample text ==
Genesis 1:1-5
Walmatijarri	English
Jarluwarlaŋy pa Kuttu ngartakpani pujurni nguwajaa ngapa yalkirijaa yimpiyimpi. Kujartikarra maŋya ngartakpani Ngarpungu. Jarluwarlaŋy pa yarr ngunaŋani muŋa ngapa mapirri. Ngajirta nguwa ngunarla. Walypa Ngarpukurajaŋka pa kirilyanani ngapaŋarni maɳpa kaŋkarni̱marraŋu. Nyanartijaŋka Ngarpu marni, "Parralanku pa tili". Mapunparnila parralani tili nyanarti. Kurriŋpala pila ngunaŋani tilijarra muŋa. Tili parralani, wali wirri̱yajarri̱nyaɭa Ngarpu. Tiliwu parla wulyumarni. Yini̱jartila pinya yutukani jini̱nyarajarti̱a pukaɳyajarti. Wali kajalkajal Ngarpungu ngartakpani tililny.	In the beginning God created heaven and earth. The earth was formless and empty, and darkness covered the deep water. The spirit of God was hovering over the water. Then God said, "Let there be light!" So there was light. God saw the light was good. So God separated the light from the darkness. God named the light "day", and the darkness he named "night". There was evening, then morning, the first day.

== See also ==
- Ngurrara, a grouping of peoples of language groups including Walmajarri

== Bibliography ==
- Hudson, Joyce. (1978). The Walmatjari: An Introduction to the Language and Culture. Darwin: Summer Institute of Linguistics
- Hudson, Joyce. (1978). The core of Walmatjari grammar. Australian Institute of Aboriginal Studies. New Jersey, U.S.A.: Humanities Press Inc.
- Hudson, Joyce & Richards, Eirlys. (1969). The phonology of Walmatjari.
- Hudson, Joyce & Richards, Eirlys. (1990). Walmajarri–English Dictionary. Darwin: Summer Institute of Linguistics
