= Meda Station =

Pastoral lease in Western Australia

Coordinates: 17.368°S 123.996°E

Location in Western Australia

Meda Station, often referred to as Meda River Station, is a pastoral lease in Western Australia that once operated as a sheep station but presently operates as a cattle station.

Situated about 38 kilometres (24 mi) east of Derby and about 76 kilometres (47 mi) north of Looma in the Kimberley region, it is between the Meda and Lennard Rivers. The country is well timbered with open grassy plains. A neighbouring property is Kimberley Downs Station.

The property occupies an area of 5,059 square kilometres (1,953 sq mi) and supports a herd of approximately 25,000 Brahman cattle. It is owned by the Jumbuck Pastoral Company and has been managed by Troy Haslet since 2015.

The property was established prior to 1883; a station employee, Henry Thomas Best, died on Meda that year. By 1885 the property was owned by Messrs Marmion and Co. and was hit by severe flooding. Over 1,300 sheep were lost at the property during a cyclone that swept through the area. In 1891 shearing produced 100 bales of wool.

Record flooding hit the area in 1894 following a cyclone. The station manager reported to Marmion that another 1,300 sheep had been lost in the cyclone. Fifteen Aboriginal people and an estimated 20,000 sheep were drowned during the floods, which left miles of country underwater.

Meda was placed on the market for auction in 1897 and advertised as occupying an area of 350,000 acres (141,640 ha) and being stocked with 8,900 sheep and 9 horses. It sold at the reserve price of £5,000 to William Silas Pearse. The following year all of the stock was sold off from the property; a total of 6,400 sheep were advertised for sale.

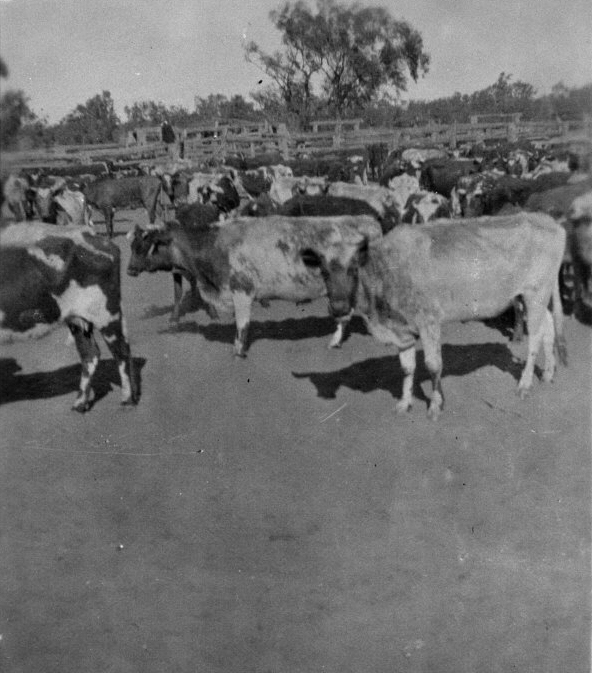
Stock and horses in yards at Meda Station in 1915

The property was acquired by the Emanuel brothers after 1897; the Emanuels were in business with Pearse and together they owned some 795,000 acres (321,725 ha) of leases in the Kimberley. In 1908 all of the squatters were under fire as being part of a "meat ring", a virtual monopoly of the meat trade in Western Australia.

Meda experienced a heavy rainfall event in 1914 with 9 inches (229 mm) of rain recorded in one fall. Widespread flooding washed away miles of fencing at Meda. The following year the property was carrying approximately 33,000 head of cattle.

In 1943 the station manager, Gordon Harold Smith, was killed at Meda while mustering cattle. His horse fell and Smith received fatal injuries as a result. Heavy rainfall was again recorded in 1945 with another 9-inch (229 mm) downpour, which arrived shortly after a dry spell.

In the 1970s approximately 2,000 hectares (4,942 acres) from the station were excised by the Lands Department of Western Australia. The land was to be regenerated following land degradation from overstocking. In 1978 the Institute of Ecotechnics acquired the lease known as Birdwood Downs, commencing land care work and offering tourist accommodation shortly afterwards.

== See also ==
- List of ranches and stations
- List of pastoral leases in Western Australia
- List of the largest stations in Australia
