= Isadore Samuel Emanuel =

Australian pastoralist (1860–1954)

Isadore Samuel Emanuel (4 February 1860 – 5 January 1954) was a pastoralist and businessman in Western Australia.

== Early life and education ==
Isadore Samuel Emanuel was born in Goulburn on 4 February 1860, the son of Solomon Emanuel Jr, who was a pastoralist and merchant. His grandfather was Samuel Emanuel, who had been elected as a member of the Legislative Assembly in New South Wales for the seat of Argyle in 1862.

Both Isadore and his brother, Sydney Phillip, were employed in a Sydney livery stable that was a part of the family business. The Kimberley district in Western Australia was opened up for settlement in 1880 and their father joined with Michael and Patrick Durack in seeking large areas of land for settlement along the Ord River.

== Western Australia ==
In 1881, after the completion of a reconnaissance of the area, the Emanuels resolved to focus on the Fitzroy River valley area in the West Kimberley area. Isadore arrived in 1884 with a flock of 2,860 sheep and established the sheep station, Noonkanbah Station, and the cattle runs, Gogo Station and Lower Liveringa Station.

The Emanuels profited by employing competent managers and earned good returns. By 1894 they established a company with Alexander Forrest, called Forrest, Emanuel and Company, creating an effective monopoly in the live cattle trade between Derby and the southern port of Fremantle with the Emanuels acting as agents in the Kimberley. The brothers expanded their pastoral interests by acquiring Meda and Jubilee Downs Stations.

Following the death of Forrest in 1901, the Emanuels bought his share of the company. At this stage the Emanuels entered into a business partnership in 1902 with Sidney Kidman and acquired a property in the neighbouring Northern Territory, Victoria River Downs Station. The property occupied an area of 10,954 square miles (28,371 km^{2}) and was regarded as one of the largest cattle stations in the world.

The Emanuels now controlled a huge area of land in the Kimberley region of Western Australia and Northern Territory with 51,800 square kilometres (20,000 sq mi) either wholly or partly owned by the brothers. They also held large investments in the meat trade and were briefly the subject of a royal commission as the leaders of a meat ring. In 1909 Kidman and the Emanuels sold Victoria River Downs for £170,000, for which they had paid £20,000, to Bovril Australian Estates.

Emanuel died in London in 1954, leaving an estate worth £721,563, of which assets to the value of £290,897 were in Western Australia.
