= Camballin, Western Australia =

Locality in the Kimberley, Western Australia

Camballin
- Town
- Coordinates: 17.991°S 124.193°E
- Country: Australia
- State: Western Australia
- LGA(s): Shire of Derby-West Kimberley
- Location: 8 km (5.0 mi) from Looma

Government
  - State electorate(s): Kimberley
  - Federal division(s): Durack

Area
  - Total: 4,210 km^{2} (1,630 sq mi)

Population
  - Total(s): 500 (SAL 2021)
- Postcode: 6728

Camballin is a small town in the West Kimberley district of Western Australia. The town is located on the Camballin Station about 110 km (68 mi) south of Derby and between Derby and Fitzroy Crossing, with the homestead being situated in the town. The town was established in the 1950s by the Public Works Department of Western Australia to service the Camballin Irrigation Scheme.

At the 2016 census, Camballin had a population of 729.

== History ==
The town was established by the Public Works Department of Western Australia to service the Camballin Irrigation Scheme, which has since become defunct due to flooding. It was initially established to support Northern Developments Pty. Ltd, a company incorporated in Sydney in 1951 to establish small scale rice production in 1952. Demonstration that rice production was feasible, a 17-mile (27 km) dam was constructed on the Uralla Creek in 1957, trebling the water storage. The name of the town was chosen by Northern Development Ltd in 1957, with the townsite being constructed to service the Liveringa Rice Project. The town was named after one of the nearby stations.

The town's growth continued with the Australian Land & Cattle Company Limited purchasing Camballin station, Liveringa station and a further five stations in the Kimberley region. This influx of private investment created strong labour demand for the next two decades, with the project leaving a lasting legacy to this day.

== Geography ==
The town lies to the east of Grant Range, and south of Erskine range.

== Description ==
The town now houses school teachers and other personnel who work at the nearby Looma Community. Amenities in the town are: caravan park, shopping (no fuel), reticulated water and power, phones (including pay phone booth) and mechanical repairs. The town is also serviced by a landfill site nearby, mobile satellite phone coverage and contains a rundown picture gardens. The power station provides power to the nearby communities of Looma and New Looma.
