= Noonkanbah Station =

Pastoral lease in the Kimberley region of Western Australia

Location in Western Australia

Noonkanbah Station (or just Noonkanbah) is a pastoral lease, both a cattle and sheep station, on the Fitzroy River between Camballin and Fitzroy Crossing in the south central Kimberley region of Western Australia.

The station was pegged out in the 1880s and covered approximately 4,000 square kilometres (1,500 sq mi). It was the subject of an infamous land-rights dispute in August 1980 when state premier Sir Charles Court enforced an oil exploration project under police protection. The traditional owners now control around 1800 square kilometres of the land sacred to the Yungngora Community.

== History ==
The station was established in the early 1880s by the Emanuel family when brothers Isadore Samuel Emanuel and Sydney Emanuel were sent to the Kimberley by their father. Between them they set up Noonkanbah, Meda, Gogo and Lower Liveringa stations.

In 1908 the station was 100,000 acres (40,469 ha) in size and was held still by Emanuel and Co, who paid a £25 rental on the property. The property held 86,989 sheep at the time.

Put up for auction in 1920 by the Emanuels, the station, along with neighbouring Gogo and Liveringa stations, was advertised as having an area of 1,035,530 acres (419,064 ha) on one compact block equipped with 400 mi (644 km) of sheep fencing. The property was described as being abundantly watered by the Fitzroy River that passes through the centre of the run, and various other pools and springs. The property included a homestead and other buildings, including the fully equipped 20-stand shearing shed. Stock included a flock of 65,000 sheep, 70 horses, 250 donkeys, 50 mules and 50 cattle.

Wool produced on the station was often in high demand and fetched high prices. In the 1930 clearance, Noonkanbah superfine wool was sold for the highest price of 16d per pound. The station took delivery of 50 merino rams from the Tootra Stud from Walebing in 1934, another 150 were sent in 1936, and a further 150 rams were sent to the station in 1941. During the drought of 1936 the plains at Noonkanbah had good feed and a record 100,000 sheep were sheared that season. The station sold 205 bales of wool in 1941. In 1950 the station was selling sheep to the Air Beef Scheme; 104 sheep were sold and transported in one lift to the abattoir about 115 mi (185 km) away. The shearing shed was busy that season, with 52,000 sheep being shorn. In 1953 about 50,000 sheep were shorn. 720 bales of greasy wool from the station sold at 64d per pound at the London wool sales later that year.

The station was at one stage owned by pastoralist William Cox, who fathered at least two children to local Yungngora women. One of his sons, Davey, stayed on to run the station after his father returned to another of his stations, Louisa Downs.

During World War II the Royal Australian Air Force established a base, named Noonkanbah, at the civil airfield at the station on 1 March 1943. No. 75 Operational Base Unit operated the base during its wartime use.

Large petrol and bomb dumps were established and the airfield was used by the Netherlands East Indies Air Force as a staging base. No 24 Squadron, 25 Squadron and 31 Squadron all utilized the airfield. The airfield was large enough to handle B-24 Liberators.

On 30 September 1944, the airfield base was made non-operational, and on 24 December 1945, the airfield was disbanded.

During the late 1950s and into the 1960s the station was managed by Duncan Beaton.

The following year, Beatson ordered the planting of 5 acres (2 ha) of lucerne in an experiment to improve the stock carrying capacity of the property. He watered his crop from one of the river pools.

A large proportion of the West Kimberley was afflicted by drought in 1952 and 1953, including Noonkanbah. Virtually all feed was lost and even many native trees started dying as a result of intense heat and lack of water. The number of cattle in the area was reduced by half. This was the first drought suffered by pastoralists in 70 years, with many hurriedly sinking bores and buying feed to keep their stock alive. Other nearby properties that were affected were Liveringa, Quandan, Gogo, Glenroy, Cherrabun, Luiluigui, Fossil Downs, Christmas Creek and Bohemia Downs stations. In 1952 over 60,000 sheep were shorn at Noonkanbah.

The Fitzroy River flooded after heavy rain in 1949 and 1954. The 1954 event came immediately after a drought and the swollen river washed away stock from both Noonkanbah and Liveringa. At the height of the flood the river level was 10 ft (3 m) above the low level crossing. Noonkanbah lost 300-400 sheep that were drowned in the boggy ground in the marshy ground.

An amphibian fossil species that existed in the area during the Triassic, Erythrobatrachus noonkanbahensis, was identified from material obtained at a bore on the station, and noted in the specific epithet of its name.

=== Traditional ownership ===
The traditional owners – the people of the Yungngora Community – were employed by the station owners until 1971 when they walked off over a pay and conditions dispute. In 1976 the station was purchased by the Aboriginal Land Fund to be developed by the traditional owners. It has since then been run by the people of the Yungngora Community.

The station was the scene for an intense political dispute when the government of the day allowed exploration company AMAX to drill for oil in sacred sites. The mining boom experienced in the 1970s led to hundreds of resource tenements being pegged on the pastoral station in the Kimberley, but an anthropological report found the land covered by the station had spiritual significance for the Yungngora community. Western Australia's Premier, Charles Court, was adamant that the exploration should go ahead regardless – and a convoy of 45 non-union drilling rigs and trucks left Perth protected by hundreds of police on 7 August 1980. Violent confrontations between police and Noonkanbah protesters ensued, culminating in the drilling rigs forcing their way through community picket lines onto sacred land.

In April 2007, the Yungngora people had their native title recognised over the Noonkanbah land.

In October 2022, the Yungnora Association was fined $250,000 after pleading guilty to multiple charges of animal cruelty, in connection with the deaths of over 100 cattle on Noonkanbah Station in 2018. The fine was suspended for two years, leading to criticism from the Pastoralists and Graziers Association which alleged that Indigenous graziers had received favourable treatment.

Ruins of the old station buildings

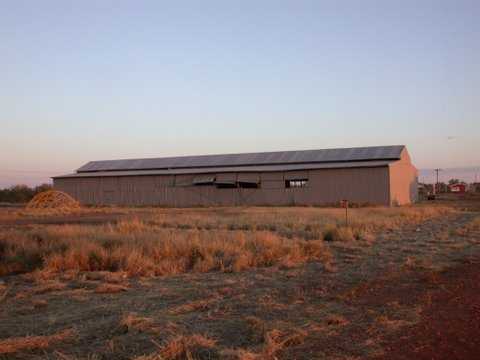
Noonkanbah woolshed, now the community centre

Sandy Billabong, near Yungngora community, with many pairs of eyes watching

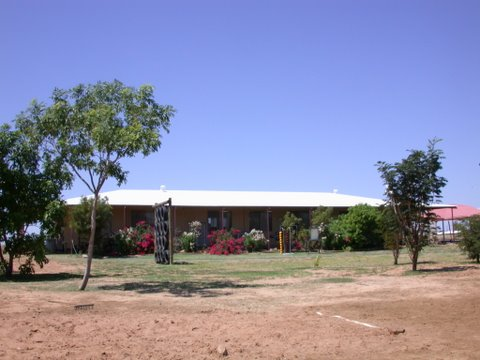
Secondary section of the Kulkarriya Community School

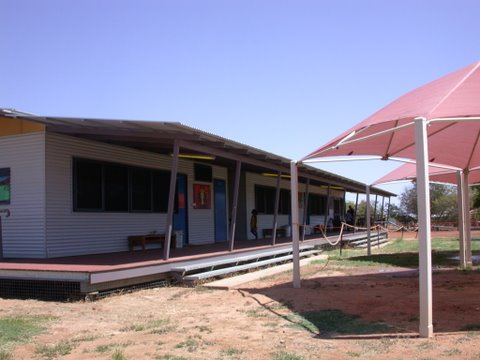
Primary section of the Kulkarriya Community School

== See also ==
- List of pastoral leases in Western Australia
- List of the largest stations in Australia
