= Margaret River (Kimberley, Western Australia) =

River in Western Australia

Coordinates: 18°10′24″S 125°37′5″E

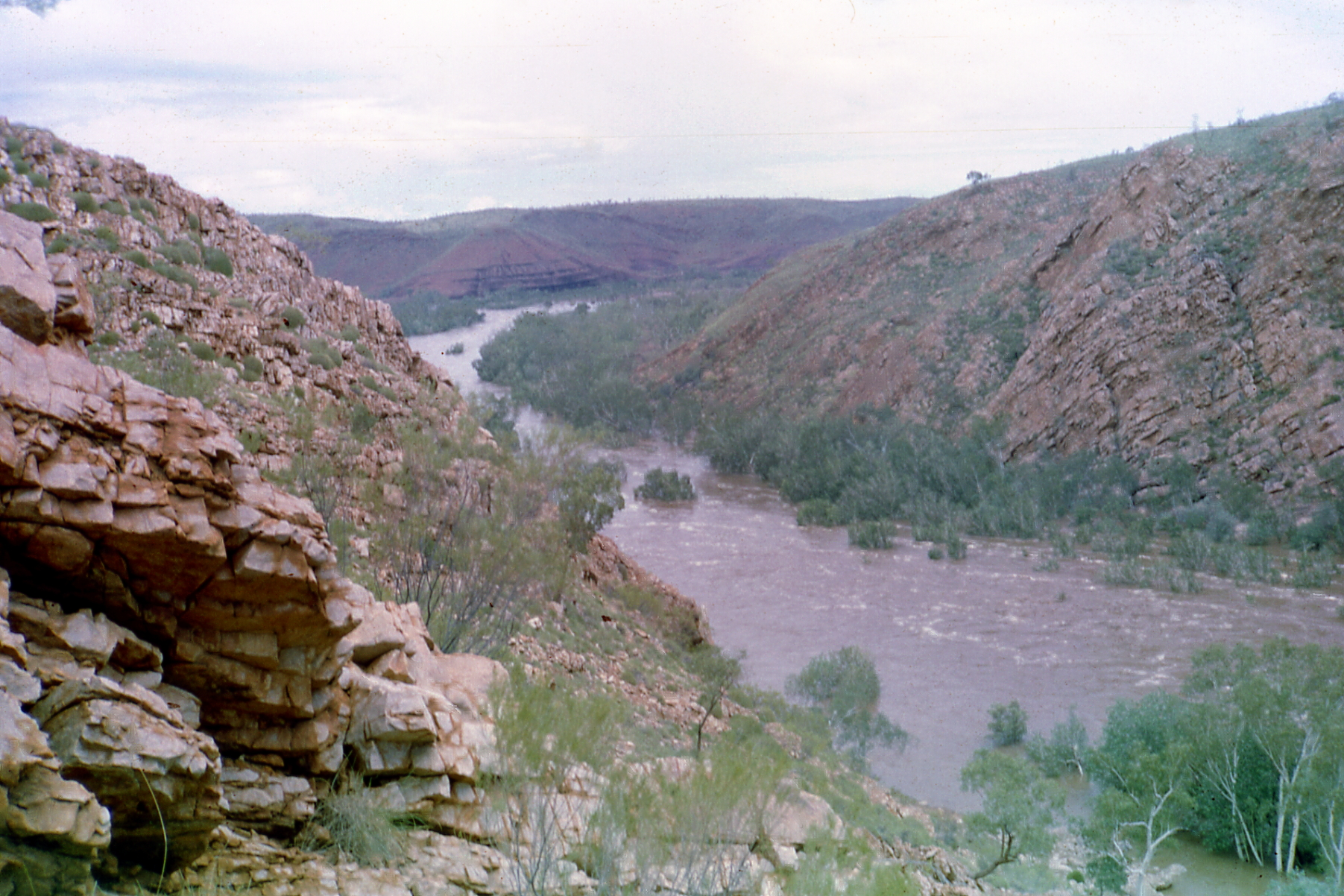
- Margaret River in flood at the entrance to the Wunaamin-Miliwundi Ranges

Location
- Country: Australia

Physical characteristics
- Source
  - location: Wunaamin-Miliwundi Ranges
  - elevation: 498 metres (1,634 ft)
- Mouth
  - location: Fitzroy River
  - elevation: 110 metres (361 ft)
- Length: 335 km (208 mi)

The Margaret River is a river in the Kimberley region of Western Australia.

The river was named on 29 May 1879 by the explorer Alexander Forrest, during an expedition in the Kimberley area, after his sister-in-law Margaret Elvire Forrest, wife of his brother and superior, Deputy Surveyor-General John Forrest, who was later to be Premier of Western Australia.

The headwaters of the river rise in the Wunaamin-Miliwundi Ranges west of Halls Creek and flow in a westerly direction until merging with the Fitzroy River. The junction of the two rivers is close to Fitzroy Crossing. The Margaret River has 15 tributaries including: Mary River, Gliddon River, O'Donnell River, Leopold River, Louisa River, Station Creek, Dead Horse Creek, Gidgia Creek and Boab Creek.

The state Public Works Department set up a flow monitoring station on the Margaret River at the entrance of the gorge where it enters the Mueller Ranges in 1966. Debate continues about the use of the Fitzroy River basin as a water source for the South West of Western Australia.

Fish such as the barramundi, freshwater sawfish, Greenway's grunter and the false-spine catfish have all been found within the river system.

The traditional owners of the areas around the river are the Djaru, Gidja and Gooniyandi peoples.

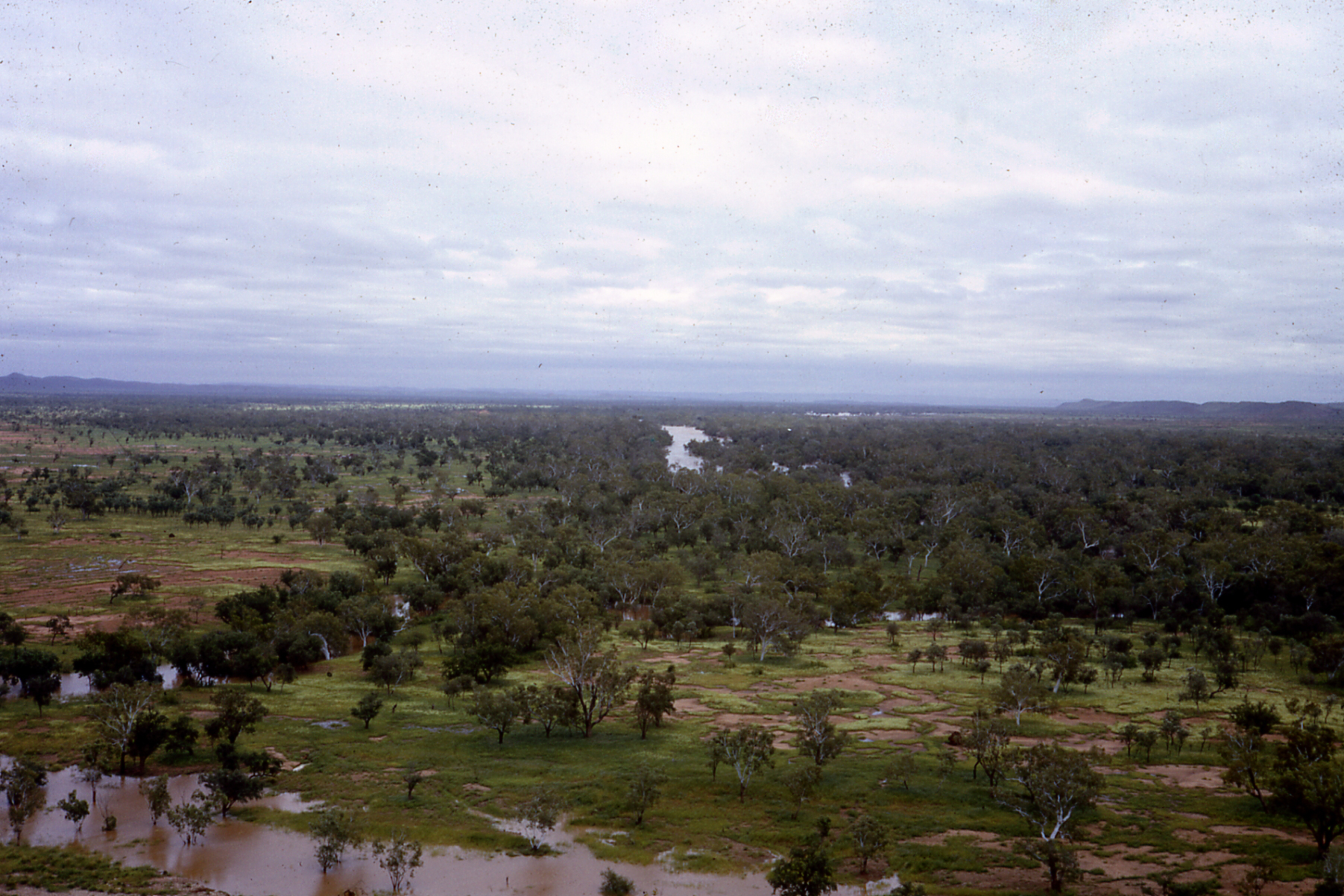
Margaret River near the Louisa Downs homestead
