= Fitzroy Crossing, Western Australia =

Fitzroy Crossing
- Town
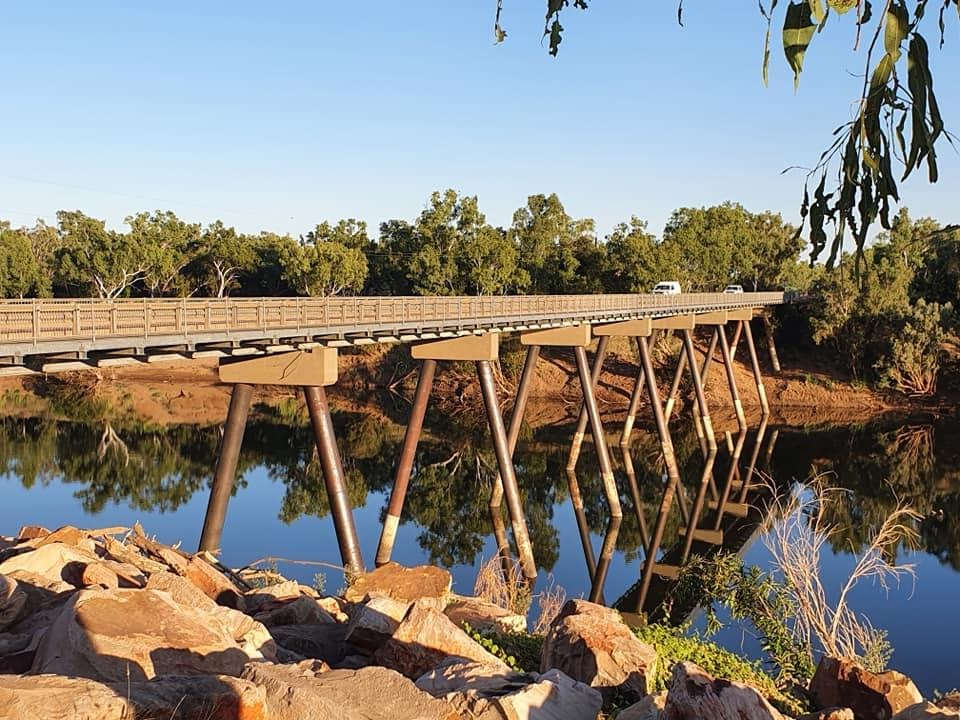
- The former road bridge over the Fitzroy River in Fitzroy Crossing

- Interactive map of Fitzroy Crossing
- Coordinates: 18°11′40″S 125°34′00″E
- Country: Australia
- State: Western Australia
- LGA: Shire of Derby-West Kimberley
- Established: 1900s

Government
  - State electorate: Kimberley
  - Federal division: Durack

Area
  - Total: 28 km^{2} (11 sq mi)
- Elevation: 114 m (374 ft)

Population
  - Total: 1,022 (UCL 2021)
- Postcode: 6765
- Mean max temp: 35.6 °C (96.1 °F)
- Mean min temp: 19.2 °C (66.6 °F)
- Annual rainfall: 541.2 mm (21.31 in)

Fitzroy Crossing is a small town in the Kimberley region of Western Australia, 400 kilometres (250 mi) east of Broome and 300 kilometres (190 mi) west of Halls Creek. It is approximately 2,524 kilometres (1,568 mi) from the state capital of Perth. It is 114 metres (374 ft) above sea level and is situated on a low rise surrounded by the vast floodplains of the Fitzroy River and its tributary Margaret River.

At the 2016 census, the population of the Fitzroy Crossing town-site was 1,297; with a further 2,000 or so people living in up to 50 Aboriginal communities scattered throughout the Fitzroy Valley. About 80% of the Fitzroy Valley population were Indigenous Australians with a split of closer to 60/40 (indigenous/non-indigenous) in the townsite. Tourism, cattle stations and mining are the main industries in the area.

== History ==
Fitzroy Crossing and the lands and valleys around it were the home for a number of Aboriginal language groups. When Fitzroy Crossing was established the main group was the Bunuba people, their land stretching from the present day Brooking Springs and Leopold Downs Station to the Oscar, Napier and Wunaamin-Miliwundi Ranges.

Another group in the area stretching on the other side of the Fitzroy River from Gogo, Fossil Downs, and Louisa Downs Station, and on either side of the Margaret River, is the Gooniyandi people. The plains Aboriginal people are the Nyigina and further south are the Walmajarri, the people of the Great Sandy Desert.

Other traditional owners of the area are the Njikena, Konejani, and Waladjari peoples.

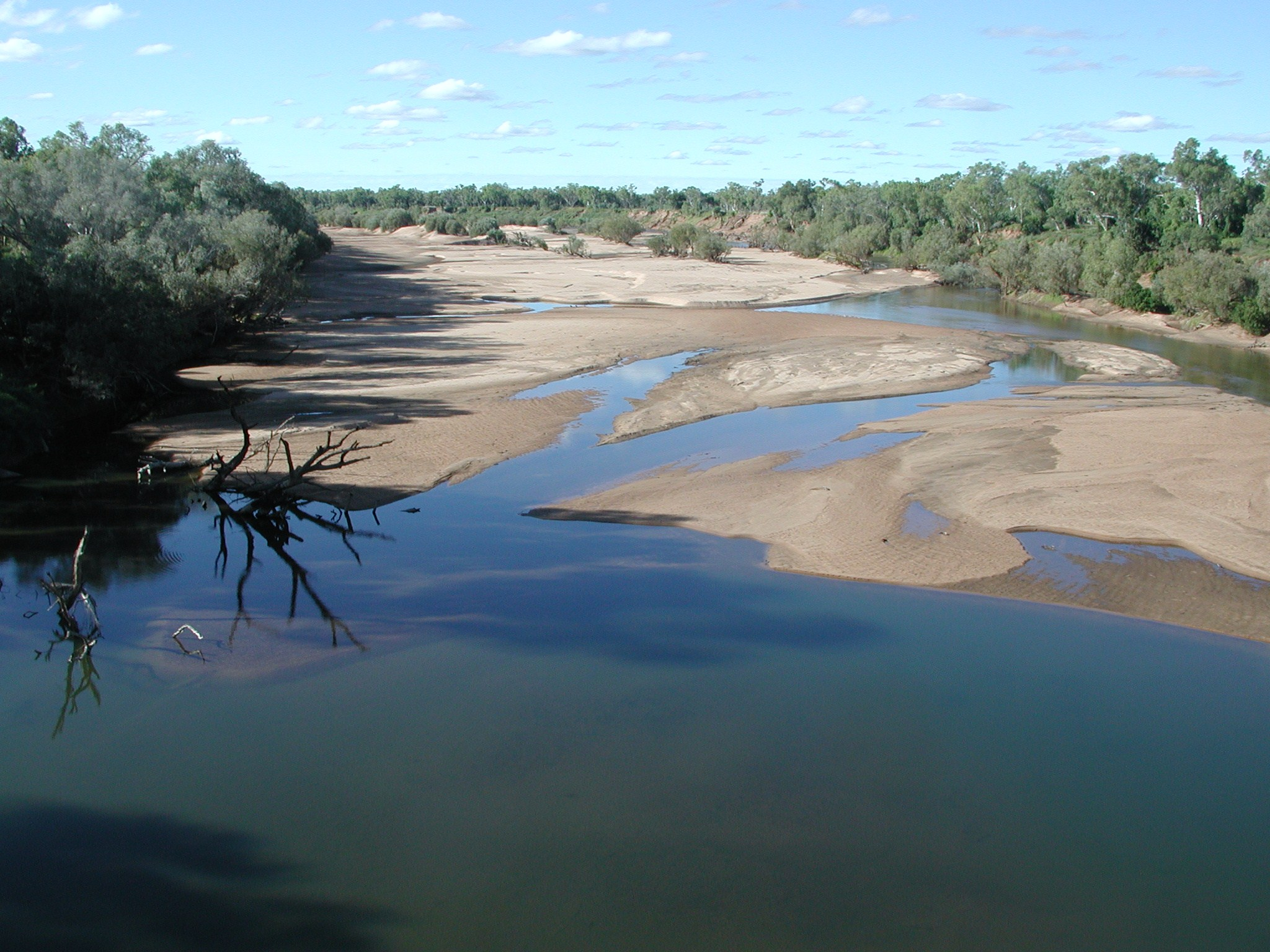
Fitzroy River at Fitzroy Crossing

One of the first European explorers of the Kimberley area was Alexander Forrest and his party in 1879, following the Fitzroy River to its junction with the Margaret River at Geikie Gorge. The party then travelled east as far as Darwin. Following this exploration, around 1882, the first sheep stations were established around the mouth of the Fitzroy and the next couple of years saw the stations move out west, with Noonkanbah and Quanbun opening up in 1886.

The area was finally settled in 1886 by Dan MacDonald when he set up the Fossil Downs cattle station. This was following a three-year, 5,600-kilometre (3,500 mi) trek from Goulburn, New South Wales.

Fitzroy Crossing received its first bridge in 1935; it was built up into a more substantial structure in 1958. However this bridge could be closed for months during the monsoonal summer. In 1974 a new bridge was built 3 kilometres (2 mi) south of the crossing, which moved the focus of the settlement from its original site. In January 2023, this bridge was heavily damaged and partially collapsed after record floods. It was replaced by a larger, sturdier bridge in December 2023.

The town was gazetted in 1975, but had been shown on maps since 1903.

Prone to occasional flooding, the town was inundated in 2002, 2011, and in 2023 following heavy rain events in the region.

In 2006, the Fitzroy Crossing Bull Sale, an annual national bull auction with participants from as far away as Queensland, was established.

In 2009 the only grocery store in the town was demolished after fire destroyed it. A new shopping centre was built and opened in 2011. Also in 2009, the local school was moved and renamed from Fitzroy Crossing District High School to Fitzroy Valley District High School.

== Indigenous affairs ==
From 1951 to 1955, S Preston Walker, a missionary with the United Aborigines Mission (UAM) on loan to the Department of Native Affairs, opened up a novel Fitzroy Crossing Feeding Depot-Mission, which was handed back to the Junjuwa Community in February 1987. He and other UAM missionaries set up a basic school, a health centre and store which was later taken over by the WA government and expanded to where it is today (2008).

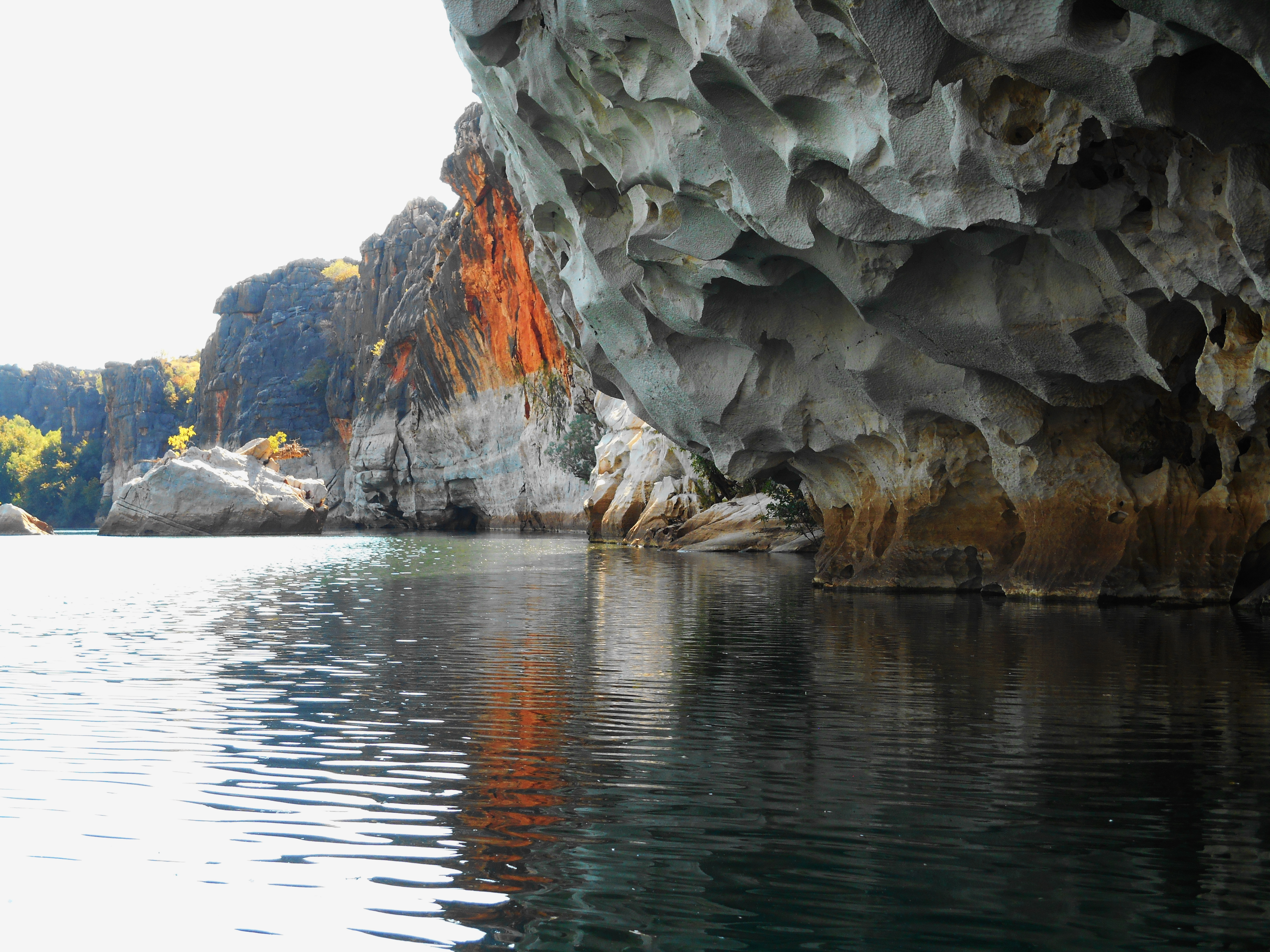
The Fitzroy River at Danggu Gorge

In February 2008, a Coronial inquest described the living conditions for Aboriginal people in the Fitzroy Crossing area as "a national disaster with no disaster response". Though the coroner noted a co-ordinated government response to the problems of Fitzroy Crossing to be lacking, local leaders have taken some action. In 2007, a restriction on alcohol sales was campaigned for by members of the Indigenous population: early indications suggest the restrictions have been positive for the town. The Rudd Federal government announced in mid-April 2008 that it supported the continuation of the alcohol ban beyond its expiry date of 23 May 2008, citing that the alcohol ban has led to:

- a 50 per cent fall in the number of people seeking treatment at the Fitzroy Crossing Emergency Department.
- a 27 per cent reduction in alcohol-related domestic violence, and
- a 14 per cent increase in high school attendance.

In its 2008–09 budget, the Department of Social Services continued financial management support services for welfare payment reform to support a child protection trial in Fitzroy Crossing. Alcohol was being bought instead of educating children. This aid in managing money was intended to assist people with financial difficulties to get involved in the community and plan for the long term.

In 2012–13 and 2013–14, the Department of Social Services set up community projects in Fitzroy Crossing.

A community meeting in 2020, called by a group of senior men concerned about the high levels of alcohol abuse, associated gambling, fighting, domestic violence and family dysfunction. There was wide concern about the number of children wandering around the town at night and getting into trouble. Despite the 12-year ban on sales of full-strength alcohol, there were sales by "sly groggers" at inflated prices. Various solutions were suggested, including safe houses for children, elders becoming mentors to children, more infrastructure for youth, and opportunities to give them hope for the future.

== Facilities ==
Fitzroy Crossing serves as the hub for the communities of the Fitzroy Valley. Many residents come into town for recreational activities, such as fishing and sports at the recreation centre, shopping (mainly for groceries), visiting family, and meetings or appointments at the hospital or other government agencies. Fitzroy Crossing is also home to many regional service providers because it is a central location to these communities.

The township of Fitzroy Crossing contains most amenities with two roadhouses, a self-serve 24-hour diesel station, supermarket, post office, newsagent, clothes shops, accommodation, mechanics, electricians, plumbers, and cafes and restaurants.

Fitzroy Crossing also has a swimming pool, covered basketball courts, a grassed Australian rules football oval, and many grassed areas around the town for public use.

Bayulu Community is nearby, 12 kilometres (7.5 mi) southeast along Great Northern Highway on Gogo Station.

== Sport ==
The Central Kimberley Football Association is centred in the town, six clubs from local communities play in a regular season. The competition was formed in 1991.

== Media ==
Fitzroy Crossing is home to Wangki Radio, a small Aboriginal community radio station that broadcasts on 936AM to the townsite and most outer communities in the Fitzroy Valley. Wangki Radio provides the latest news, weather, road reports and music to people in the remote parts of the Kimberley. ABC Radio also broadcasts two radio stations in Fitzroy; ABC Local Radio 106.1 and ABC Radio National 107.7. Fitzroy Crossing also receives all regional Western Australian digital television stations.

== Climate ==
Fitzroy Crossing has a semi-arid climate (Bsh). The climate is very hot, with the average maximum temperature ranging from 30 °C (86 °F) in July to 41 °C (106 °F) in November. The highest temperature was recorded on 1 January 1969, when it reached 47.9 °C (118.2 °F), while the lowest minimum was recorded on 27 June 1971, when the temperature dropped to 0.6 °C (33.1 °F). Most of the rainfall occurs from December to March. April through to October are dry, but cooler.

Climate data for Fitzroy Crossing Comparison/Fitzroy Crossing Aerodrome
Month	Jan	Feb	Mar	Apr	May	Jun	Jul	Aug	Sep	Oct	Nov	Dec	Year
Record high °C (°F)	47.9 (118.2)	45.0 (113.0)	44.6 (112.3)	42.2 (108.0)	40.1 (104.2)	37.0 (98.6)	37.3 (99.1)	40.6 (105.1)	42.9 (109.2)	45.1 (113.2)	47.1 (116.8)	47.4 (117.3)	47.9 (118.2)
Mean daily maximum °C (°F)	37.7 (99.9)	36.4 (97.5)	36.9 (98.4)	36.2 (97.2)	32.1 (89.8)	29.9 (85.8)	29.6 (85.3)	32.5 (90.5)	36.2 (97.2)	39.4 (102.9)	40.6 (105.1)	40.1 (104.2)	35.6 (96.1)
Mean daily minimum °C (°F)	24.7 (76.5)	24.1 (75.4)	23.1 (73.6)	19.6 (67.3)	15.7 (60.3)	12.2 (54.0)	10.7 (51.3)	12.7 (54.9)	17.2 (63.0)	21.4 (70.5)	24.2 (75.6)	25.2 (77.4)	19.2 (66.6)
Record low °C (°F)	16.4 (61.5)	17.8 (64.0)	14.8 (58.6)	10.9 (51.6)	5.6 (42.1)	0.6 (33.1)	1.6 (34.9)	3.4 (38.1)	5.0 (41.0)	11.2 (52.2)	14.3 (57.7)	15.6 (60.1)	0.6 (33.1)
Average precipitation mm (inches)	152.8 (6.02)	139.1 (5.48)	81.5 (3.21)	20.1 (0.79)	11.1 (0.44)	8.4 (0.33)	6.2 (0.24)	1.4 (0.06)	1.8 (0.07)	5.4 (0.21)	25.7 (1.01)	87.3 (3.44)	540.1 (21.26)
Average precipitation days	12.3	10.7	7.2	2.0	1.5	1.0	0.7	0.3	0.4	1.3	4.0	8.3	49.7
Source 1:
Source 2:
