= Unggumi =

Indigenous Australian people

The Unggumi, also written Ongkomi, are an Aboriginal Australian people of the Kimberley region of Western Australia.

== Country ==
Norman Tindale estimated that the Unggumi's traditional territorial lands stretch over some 9,800 square kilometres (3,800 sq mi), centered on the upper limestone range and plateaus in and around the Wunaamin Miliwundi Range. They occupied the area south of the Isdell River gorge, as far as the Lennard River and Chestnut Creek. Their western frontier was around the headwaters of the Robinson River. To the south east, they hunted as far as the Richenda River.

== History ==
Tindale speculated on the basis of the nuances in their terminology for the cardinal points, that at one time the Unggumi had been a coastal people who had been driven by tribal pressures to seek sanctuary on the hard, inaccessible terrain of the upland ranges. The Ngarinjin lay northeast, the Wurla directly east, the Bunuba south-east the Nyigina directly south, while the Warrwa, and the Umiida lay on their western flank, between them and the sea.

== Alternative names ==
- Ong Komi
- Wongkomi
- Ongaranjan
- Ungumi, Ungami
- Ngarangari – Ngarinjin exonym meaning 'top-dwelling', referring to their living on the top of the range
- Wunggumic, Ngarangari, Ong, Komi, Wongkami, Wongkomiy (language names)

== Sources ==
- "AIATSIS map of Indigenous Australia". AIATSIS. 14 May 2024.
- "Tindale Tribal Boundaries" (PDF). Department of Aboriginal Affairs, Western Australia. September 2016. Archived from the original (PDF) on 8 March 2016.
- Tindale, Norman Barnett (1974). "Ongkomi (WA)". Aboriginal Tribes of Australia: Their Terrain, Environmental Controls, Distribution, Limits, and Proper Names. Australian National University. ISBN 978-0-708-10741-6. Archived from the original on 20 March 2020.
- "Unggumi". Australian National University.
