= Yeeda Station =

Pastoral lease in Western Australia

Coordinates: 17.61481°S 123.64676°E

Location in Western Australia

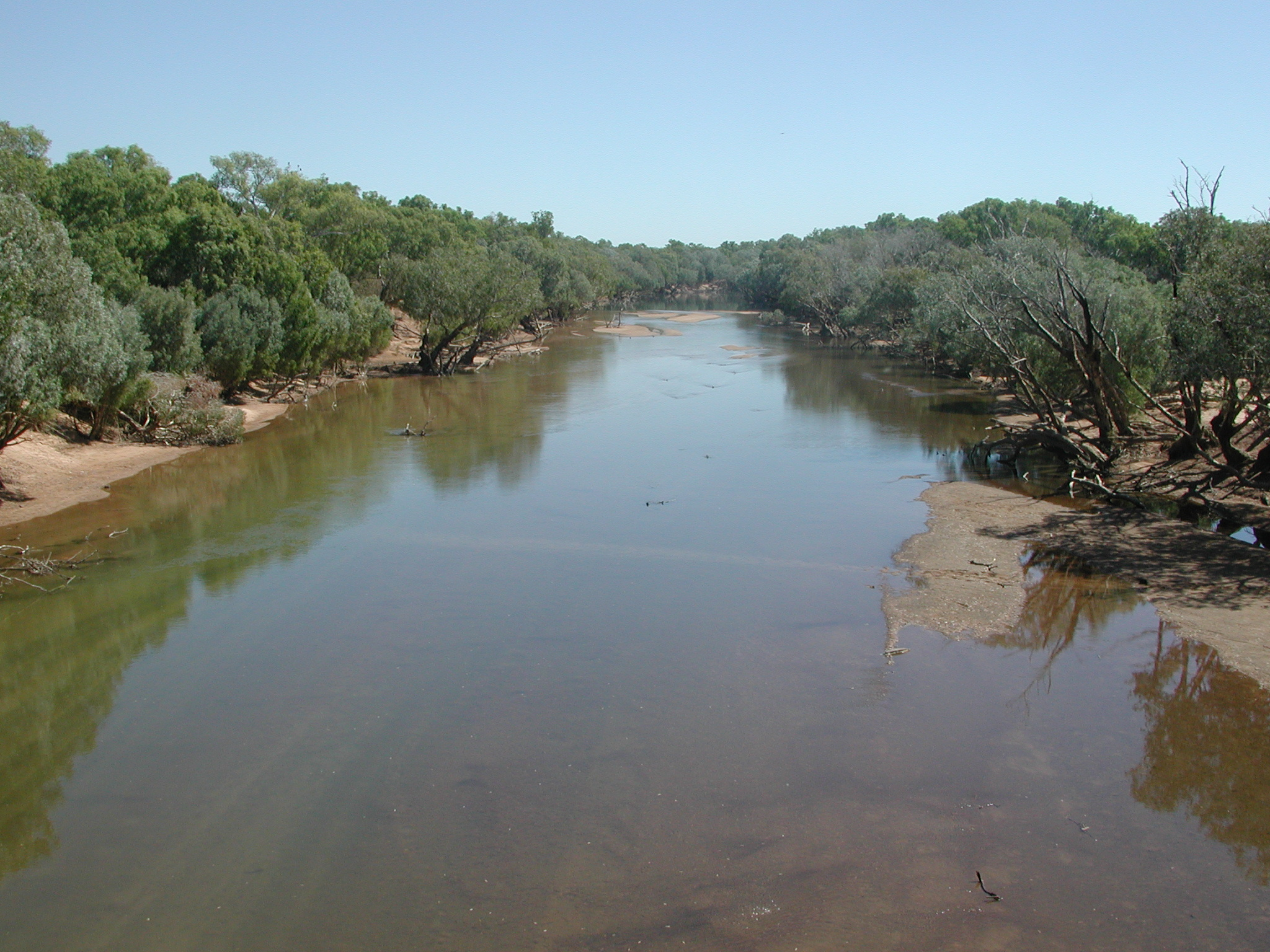
Fitzroy River and floodplain

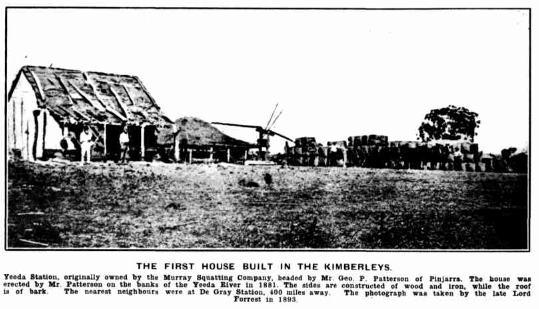
Yeeda homestead 1893

Yeeda Station is a pastoral lease that operates as a cattle station in the Kimberley region of Western Australia.

== Description ==
The property is located about 41 kilometres (25 mi) south of Derby and 71 kilometres (44 mi) north west of Looma and 160 km east of Broome. It encompasses much of the northern end of the Fitzroy and Yeeda Rivers, the Fitzroy River mouth and vast coastal floodplains. Yeeda station is operated along with several other stations in the area including Kilto and Mount Jowlaenger stations.

== History ==
The traditional owners of the areas around the Fitzroy river include the Nyikina people to the north west and the Warwa people to the south east, who have lived in the area for at least 40,000 years. The local peoples know the area as Mardoowarra; the river and its vast floodplains are of great spiritual, cultural, medicinal and ecological significance to them.

The first European to visit the area was George Grey, who ventured into the mouth of the Fitzroy River in 1837 aboard HMS Beagle.

The first owners of the station were the Murray Squatting Company, composed of William Paterson, George Paterson, H. Cornish, Alexander Richardson, and Samuel Elliott. The company took up the property in the newly opened West Kimberley in 1880.

Stock was introduced to the area in late 1880. It was first stocked with sheep then converted to cattle a few years later, which were more suited to the environment. The Government revenue cutter Ruby succeeded in passing over the sandbar at the mouth of the Fitzroy and anchored at the confluence of the Yeeda in 1881 where, at low tide, "there was a very good landing for stock". Captain Walcott explored much of the river and the surrounding waterways as part of the same expedition, describing the excellent pasture available, and of landing stock and stores for settlers. Walcott was briefed by George Julius Brockman, who was on the same expedition, that the area around the Yeeda and Meda Rivers was all of "excellent description". Brockman had accompanied by Paterson, one of the station owners, on an expedition on the lands surrounding the Yeeda, Fitzroy and Meda rivers in December 1880 and rejoined the men at their camp in September 1881, where the sheep they had introduced in June were thriving on the land and had produced about 200 lambs.

The main homestead is reported as the first house built in the Kimberley when the property was owned by the Murray Squatting Company, headed by Geo P. Patterson of Pinjarra. The house was erected by Patterson on the banks of the Yeeda River in 1881. The sides are constructed of wood and iron while the roof is made of bark. The nearest neighbours at the time were De Grey Station, about 100 miles (161 km) away.

Cattle were introduced to the station in 1882 when Paterson returned to the north, but sheep were still being shipped to the property from Cossack to Beagle Bay. The Murray Squatting Company sold Yeeda Station in 1883 and acquired Mardie Station shortly afterwards paying a "handsome price for the Fortescue River Station". The property was sold to a London financier, Mr. Game, who handed it over to Mr. A Forrest who in turn placed it under the management of George Rose.

A gold rush started soon afterwards to the headwaters of the Fitzroy, Ord and Margaret Rivers following the release of a geological survey from Derby and around much of the West Kimberley including Yeeda in 1884. Yeeda became a common point of departure to the goldfields for prospectors looking for gold. The station was still being managed by Rose at this time, and still owned by James Aylward Game of London.

The Fitzroy River flooded in 1894, drowning at least fifteen people and sweeping away about 20,000 sheep from properties along the river. Yeeda was inundated but no people died. The telegraph line had been washed away and communication was cut off for a couple of days. About 800 sheep and a number of cattle were lost from the property. Rose managed to restore communications while checking on the condition of stock; he also noted several miles of fencing had been washed away. More flooding occurred in 1896 with the water reaching 5 feet (1.5 m) higher than the previous flood.

By 1901 the station manager was Lyal Galbraith; by the following year the station had a cattle herd of about 10,000 head. In 1906 the station lost about 600 head of stock from drought, the rains arriving just in time to save the remaining herd; other stations in the area such as Gogo and Fossil Downs suffered far heavier losses.

New flood records were set on the Fitzroy in 1914 when the manager at Yeeda reported that "the Fitzroy River already in flood, was augmented by a farther large body of water, causing the highest previous flood marks to be exceeded". Large numbers of stock were washed away and near the homestead the water was 6 miles (10 km) wide for a length of over 20 miles (32 km). Yeeda had recorded 15 inches (381 mm) of rain over the previous week with other nearby stations recording even more. Cattle ticks first appeared at Yeeda, Kimberley Downs and Obagama in 1916 causing outbreaks of red-water fever in the herds.

By 1920 the size of the property was estimated as being one million acres – 1,562 square miles (4,046 km^{2}) – and stocked with about 20,000 head of cattle. The station's manager was Mr. English and it had been owned by Sir Sidney Kidman for the last few years. Mr W. Steele was the station manager in 1924, the same year an Aboriginal woman from the property contracted leprosy and was sent to Derby for treatment.

Following the death of Kidman in 1935, many of his company's properties were sold off, including Yeeda in 1939. The 800,000 acre – 1,250 square miles (3,237 km^{2}) – property was bought by Yeeda Station Ltd, with Hubert Evans being the managing director.

In 1941 the station manager, Headley Eugene Kenny, was fatally shot at Yeeda. Kenny was cleaning his own firearm at the time when it accidentally discharged. The replacement manager, Frederick Hugh Fraser, was arrested in 1945 for cattle stealing from the Emanuel Brothers Napier Downs Pastoral Company.

More flooding occurred at the property in 1947 following a cyclone crossing the coast, with Yeeda recording 7.1 inches (180 mm) of rain in a 24-hour period. This resulted in a mob of cattle from the station having to swim a half mile to get to the port for loading.

The area was struck by drought from 1949 to 1952 with only 4.5 inches (114 mm) of rain falling in the last 18 months. Heavy rains arrived early in 1953, but not before some stock were lost. George Mawley, who was a part owner of Yeeda, predicted a shortage of store bullocks in four years time as a result of the losses. Heavy rains were received the next year resulting in the death of a stockman from the property who drowned in 1954 when attempting to cross the swollen river.

The station owner was once owned by prominent the Sydney barrister Frank Stratton McAlary, who also owned Mount House Station.

The property was acquired in 1999 by Vicki and Jack Burton who had owned neighbouring Kilto station. The Yeeda Pastoral Company was formed by the Burton, Taberer and Keys families, who then expanded further, purchasing other nearby runs with a total herd of 80,000 head of cattle and 20,000 head of sheep in the Kimberley region. The company produces free range animals with no inoculation, no use of antibiotics and no hormones. The company expanded its operations by building a meatworks at Kilto that had received approval in 2011. This was to be a pilot project for a much bigger abattoir to be built at Yeeda in the future.

In 2001, Yeeda acquired Mt Jowlaenga Station, which adjoins Yeeda Station. Then in 2003, Yeeda acquired the Springvale Station aggregation area which includes Mabel Downs, Texas and Alice Downs Stations, with some 20,000 head of cattle. Springvale is located near Halls Creek, about 500 km from Yeeda Station, in the East Kimberley region.

In 2019 the Burton family sold their stake in Yeeda Pastoral Company to ADM Capital (after selling a 7% stake to ADM in 2017) with remaining Keys family and other shareholders staying on board. In 2020 a new management team was bought in.

== See also ==
- List of ranches and stations
- List of pastoral leases in Western Australia
