= Brooking Springs =

Pastoral lease in Western Australia

Location in Western Australia

Brooking Springs Station is a pastoral lease that operates as a cattle station in Western Australia.

== Location ==
It is situated about 13 kilometres (8 mi) north of Fitzroy Crossing and approximately 230 kilometres (143 mi) south east of Derby, Western Australia in the Kimberley region. The property has approximately 35 miles (56 km) of double frontage to the Fitzroy River, including many permanent pools of water. Mount Hardman and numerous creeks are also within the station boundaries.

== History ==
The traditional owners of the area are the Bunuba people, who have worked on the property as stockmen since the property was established.

In 1954 the property occupied an area of 693,737 acres (2,807 km^{2}) when it was placed on the market. At this time it was stocked with 8,000 head of cattle and 160 horses, and was subdivided into five paddocks.

In 2001 the leaseholder was Peter Camm, who was blocked from buying Moola Bulla and Mount Amhurst Stations by the planning minister Alannah MacTiernan. The block resulted from cattle stealing charges that had been brought against Camm three years earlier.

The family of Jill Jenyns placed the property on the market following her death in a helicopter crash in 2011. The property was expected to fetch A$15 million and was stocked with approximately 15,000 head of cattle. It sold later the same year for A$18 million to the Bunuba Cattle Company, an Indigenous group, with the Australian Agricultural Company expected to manage the operations.

As of 2014 the 1,959-square-kilometre (756 sq mi) property was still on the market along with at least 15 others in the Kimberley and Northern Territory.

== See also ==
- List of ranches and stations
