= Adcock River =

River in Kimberley region of Western Australia

Coordinates: 17°33′21″S 126°8′23″E

Location
- Country: Australia

Physical characteristics
- Source
  - location: Philips Range
  - elevation: 528 metres (1,732 ft)
- Mouth
  - location: Fitzroy River
  - elevation: 181 metres (594 ft)
- Length: 118 km (73 mi)

The Adcock River is a river in the Kimberley region of Western Australia.

The headwaters of the river rise in the Philips Range near Qodesh then flow in a south-easterly direction parallel with the Wunaamin-Miliwundi Ranges and past Mount House, Mount Clifton and Mount Hamilton before merging with the Fitzroy River near Fitzroy Bluff.

The Adcock has three tributaries: Throssel River, Annie Creek and Walsh Creek.

Frank Hann named the river in 1898 after Charles and William Adcock of Derby: Hann explained: "Messrs Adcock Bros of Derby were very kind to me and provided exceedingly reasonable in the important matter of a supply of rations."

The traditional owners of the areas around the river are the Nyikina people.

Fish such as Greenway's grunter, the flathead goby and the false spotted gudgeon have been found within the river system.
