= Kimberley–Perth Canal =

The Kimberley–Perth Canal was a proposal to channel water from the Fitzroy River in the Kimberley region of Western Australia via the Pilbara, to the southwestern capital of Perth, a distance of approximately 3,700 kilometres (2,300 mi).

== History ==
In the late 1980s, Water Resources Minister Ernie Bridge proposed a water pipeline from the Kimberley.

In 2005, infrastructure company Tenix proposed the idea of a $2 billion, 7 m (23 ft) wide canal as a solution for Perth and the Western Australian region's water problems.

The canal proposal was presented as part of Colin Barnett's unsuccessful 2005 state election campaign. As opposition leader, he ruled it out when campaigning for the 2008 election. In 2012, following Perth's driest July on record, Premier Barnett raised the proposal again, saying that "from a technical or engineering point of view, it's not difficult to do".

== Water source ==
The Fitzroy River, with its catchments fed by variable tropical rainfall, is reported to deliver 9,200 gigalitres of mean annual flow, and at peak floods is stated as being "probably the largest river in Australia" when it has been reported to discharge up to 60,000 cubic metres per second into King Sound and the Indian Ocean.

To prevent damage to the river, the surrounding environment and fish, surplus wet-season flood flow would be pumped from the river 60 kilometres (37 mi) inland from the coast and transported by canal, avoiding interference with the eco-sensitive flood plain, then stored by aquifer recharge in and re-gathered from the La Grange Aquifer – a 280-kilometre (170 mi) long natural underground lake – to provide a variable wet-season buffer supply.

== Environmental issues ==
Environmental groups generally consider Kimberley water should not be developed at all, and the World Wildlife Fund cited a 1993 WA Government report stating that aquifers in the Fitzroy River had volumes of not much more than 200 gigalitres (260,000,000 cu yd) and that the pipeline or canal requirements would cause serious environmental damage.

== Previous cost estimates ==
Canal

- Former State Government estimate - $14.5 billion
- Colin Barnett - $2 billion

Pipeline

- Ernie Bridge - $3 billion
