= George Julius Brockman =

Australian pastoralist (1850–1912)

- Born: 2 January 1850; Guildford, Western Australia
- Died: 29 August 1912 (aged 62); Geraldton, Western Australia
- Occupations: Explorer, pastoralist
- Relatives: Charles Samuel Brockman (brother)

George Julius Brockman (2 January 1850 – 29 August 1912) was a prominent explorer and pastoralist in the Gascoyne and Kimberley regions of Western Australia.

Born in 1850 at Guildford, George was the seventh son of Robert Brockman and brother of Charles Samuel Brockman. Brockman's father was a settler in the Lake Bamban district near Gingin. The family moved to Mimigarra, near Moore River while Brockman was still a boy then later to a property on the Greenough River.

Brockman left home at 16 years of age and rode south to Busselton and eventually took a job at Henty station near Bunbury.

The May River and Meda River were named in 1881 by Brockman during an expedition in the Kimberley area looking for grazing land north of the Fitzroy River. He named the May after the granddaughter of John Septimus Roe, Mary Matilda (May) Thomson, and the Meda after HMS Meda, an Admiralty surveying vessel that charted the coastline in the area including the river mouth in 1880. Brockman applied for a 250,000-acre (101,171 ha) leasehold along the Meda which the government refused instead offering a lease for 100,000 acres (40,469 ha) for 12 years rent free. He stocked the property with 1,100 ewes, which suffered through drought followed by floods.

Brockman acquired the 800,000 acres (323,749 ha) Minilya Station in 1884 for £15,000, from his brother. The property was struck by drought in 1890, then a lean season in 1891. By 1893 good rains meant good feed and plentiful water with Brockman selling plenty of stock. The drought came again in 1895 and 1896 reducing his flock of sheep from 12,500 and his cattle from 3,000 to 10. He remained there until 1902, then sold the property to Mr. D. N. McLeod. He then travelled and bought a property in Guildford.

Brockman died on 29 August 1912 in Geraldton.
