= May River (Australia) =

River in Western Australia

Coordinates: 17°07′S 123°50′E

Location
- Country: Australia

Physical characteristics
- Source
  - location: Lennard River
  - elevation: 45 metres (148 ft)
- Mouth
  - location: King Sound
  - elevation: sea level
- Length: 69 km (43 mi)
- Basin size: 13,188 km^{2} (5,092 sq mi)

The May River is a river in the Kimberley region of Western Australia.

The river is formed when the Lennard River splits into two channels north of Mount Marmion and near the Kimberley Downs Station homestead, the other channel being the Meda River. It continues to flow west north-westward through Poulton Pool until it eventually discharges into Stokes Bay, King Sound which is north-east of Derby.

The river was named in 1881 by a pioneer of the area, George Julius Brockman, during an expedition in the Kimberley area looking for grazing land north of the Fitzroy River. He named the river after the granddaughter of John Septimus Roe, Mary Matilda (May) Thomson.

The only tributaries of the May and the Lennard and Camiara Creek.

The northern river shark is known to inhabit the tidal region of the river and has been found further upstream. Barramundi and cherabin are also caught in the river pools after the wet season.
