= Warrwa =

Indigenous people of the Kimberley region of Western Australia

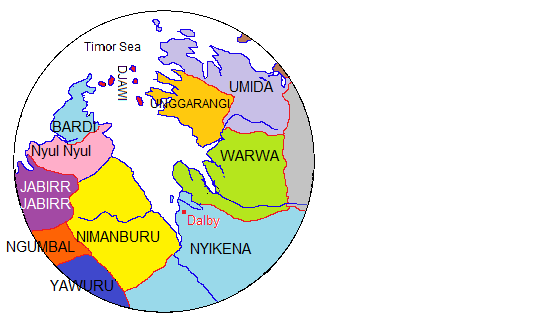
Traditional lands of Aboriginal tribes around Derby, WA

The Warrwa, also spelt Warwa, are an Aboriginal Australian people of the Kimberley region of Western Australia.

== Language ==
Warrwa is an eastern Nyulnyulan language, sufficiently closely related to Nyigina to be classified as a dialect of the latter.

== Country ==
According to Norman Tindale's estimate, the Warrwa's domains encompassed approximately 3,800 square miles (9,800 km^{2}), extending along the eastern shores of King Sound from Fraser River to Round Hill on Stokes Bay. Their inland extension reached as far as the upper Logue River. Their presence on the Fitzroy River was thought to run only as far as Yeeda. They were also present in the area of Derby, and north of Meda, inland to roughly 40 miles (64 km). To their north lay the Umiida, on their eastern flank were the Unggumi, while the Nyigina were on their southern frontier.

== Pre-contact times ==
According to Tindale, in pre-contact times, the Warrwa were affected by the movement of the Nyigina down the Fitzroy river, which effectively drove a wedge between Warrwa clans, that were subsequently cut off from each other. The incoming Nyigina distinguished thereafter the western Warwa ('little Warrwa') from the eastern Warrwa around Derby and Meda ('big Warrwa').

== Alternative names ==
- Waruwa
- Warwai, Warrwai
- Kolaruma (an Unggumi exonym for them meaning 'people of the coast')

== Sources ==
- "AIATSIS map of Indigenous Australia". AIATSIS. 14 May 2024.
- "Tindale Tribal Boundaries" (PDF). Department of Aboriginal Affairs, Western Australia. September 2016. Archived from the original (PDF) on 8 March 2016.
- Bates, Daisy (1914). "Social Organization of some Western Australian Tribes". Australian Association for the Advancement of Science, 14th Meeting. 13: 387–400.
- Capell, Arthur (March 1940). "Social Organization of some Western Australian Tribes". Oceania. 10 (3): 241–272. doi:10.1002/j.1834-4461.1940.tb00292.x. JSTOR 40327769.
- Tindale, Norman Barnett (1974). "Warwa (WA)". Aboriginal Tribes of Australia: Their Terrain, Environmental Controls, Distribution, Limits, and Proper Names. Australian National University. ISBN 978-0-708-10741-6. Archived from the original on 20 March 2020.
