= Acacia gloeotricha =

Conservation status
- Priority One — Poorly Known Taxa (DEC)

Scientific classification
- Kingdom: Plantae
- Clade: Tracheophytes
- Clade: Angiosperms
- Clade: Eudicots
- Clade: Rosids
- Order: Fabales
- Family: Fabaceae
- Subfamily: Caesalpinioideae
- Clade: Mimosoid clade
- Genus: Acacia
- Species: A. gloeotricha

Binomial name
- Acacia gloeotricha A.R.Chapman & Maslin
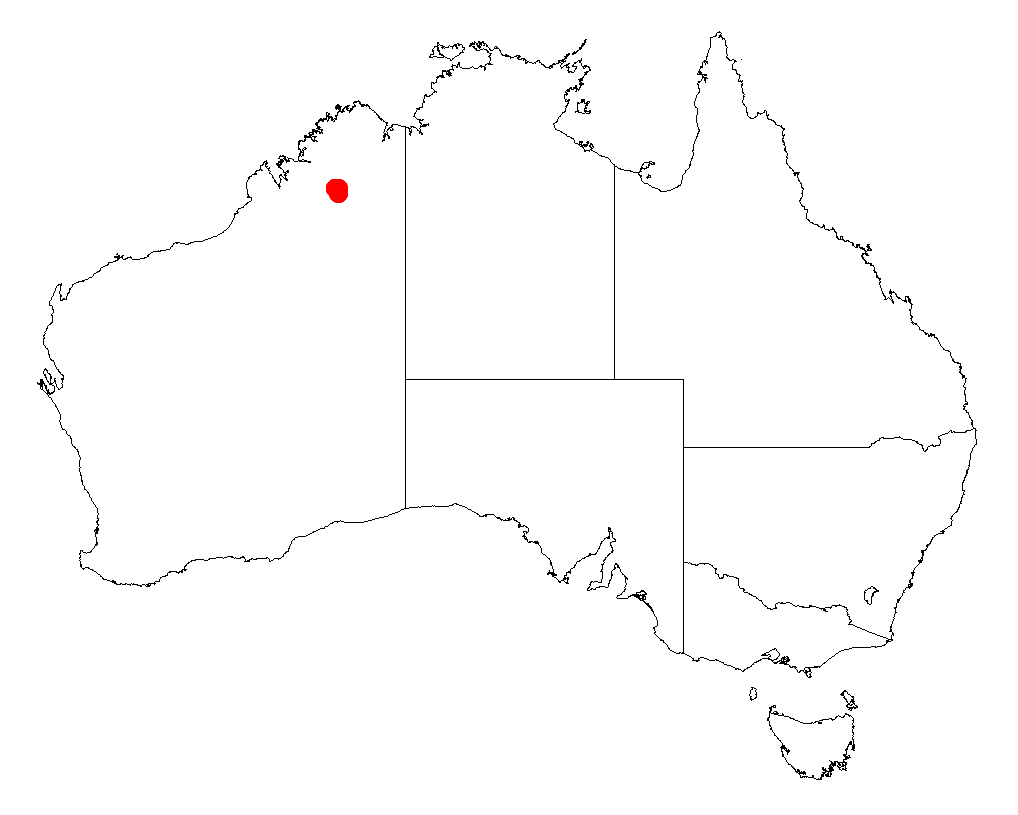
- Occurrence data from AVH

Synonyms
- Acacia aff. stipuligera (A.C.Beauglehole 53862); Acacia sp. I; Acacia sp. I Kimberley Flora; Racosperma gloeotrichum (A.R.Chapm. & Maslin) Pedley

Species of legume

Acacia gloeotricha is a species of flowering plant in the family Fabaceae and is endemic to the north of Western Australia. It is an openly-branched, sticky shrub with finely ribbed branchlets, erect, narrowly elliptic phyllodes, cylindrical spikes of bright golden yellow flowers and linear, crusty pods raised over the seeds

== Description ==
Acacia gloeotricha is an openly-branched, sticky shrub that typically grows to a height of up to 4 m (13 ft), its branchlets finely ribbed and covered with glandular hairs. The phyllodes are erect, narrowly elliptic and asymmetric, the lower margin more or less straight and the upper margin convex, 20–90 mm (0.79–3.54 in) long and 8–18 mm (0.31–0.71 in) wide. The phyllodes are covered with glandular hairs, with three to five veins that are more prominent than the rest, and there are stipules at the base of the phyllodes. The flowers are bright golden yellow and borne in mostly two cylindrical spikes about 40 mm (1.6 in) long on a peduncle 7–15 mm (0.28–0.59 in) long. Flowering has been recorded in June, and the pods are linear, 3–5 mm (0.12–0.20 in) long, crusty, covered with glandular hairs and raised over the seeds. The seeds are shiny black, broadly elliptic, about 4.5 mm (0.18 in) long with a white aril.

== Taxonomy ==
Acacia gloeotricha was first formally described in 1999 by Alexander Robert Chapman and Bruce Maslin in the journal Nuytsia from specimens collected in the King Leopold Ranges in 1976. The specific epithet (gloeotricha) is derived from the ancient Greek "gloeo" meaning 'a sticky substance' and "thrix, trichos" meaning 'hair', referring to the "conspicuous glandular hairs on the branchlets, phyllodes, peduncles and pods".

== Distribution and habitat ==
This species of wattle grows in sandy soils over sandstone, and is only known from the King Leopold Range in the Central Kimberley bioregion of northern Western Australia.

== Conservation status ==
Acacia gloeotricha is listed as "Priority One" by the Government of Western Australia Department of Biodiversity, Conservation and Attractions, meaning that it is known from only one or a few locations where it is potentially at risk.

== See also ==
- List of Acacia species
