= Richenda River =

River in Kimberley region of Western Australia

Coordinates: 17°24′14″S 125°5′5″E

Location
- Country: Australia

Physical characteristics
- Source
  - location: Wunaamin-Miliwundi Ranges
  - elevation: 351 metres (1,152 ft)
- Mouth
  - location: Lennard River
  - elevation: 102 metres (335 ft)
- Length: 61 km (38 mi)

The Richenda River is a river in the Kimberley region of Western Australia.

The headwaters of the river rise in the Wunaamin-Miliwundi Ranges near Mount Broome and flow in a southerly direction. The river then flows through Richenda gorge and turns west, flowing through Tunnel Creek National Park and continuing westward until discharging into the Lennard River to the east of Windjana Gorge.

The only tributary to the Richenda river is Dyson Creek.

The traditional owners of the area that the river flows through are the Bunuba people.
