= Acacia capillaris =

Conservation status
- Priority Two — Poorly Known Taxa (DEC)

Scientific classification
- Kingdom: Plantae
- Clade: Tracheophytes
- Clade: Angiosperms
- Clade: Eudicots
- Clade: Rosids
- Order: Fabales
- Family: Fabaceae
- Subfamily: Caesalpinioideae
- Clade: Mimosoid clade
- Genus: Acacia
- Species: A. capillaris

Binomial name
- Acacia capillaris A.S.George
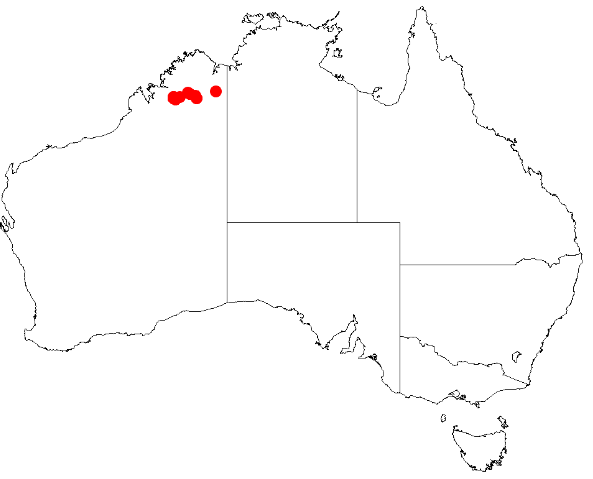
- Occurrence data from AVH

Synonyms
- Racosperma capillare (A.S.George) Pedley

Species of legume

Acacia capillaris is a species of flowering plant in the family Fabaceae and is endemic to the north of Western Australia. It is an erect shrub with hairy branchlets, erect, flattened phyllodes arranged in whorls, heads of yellow flowers, and linear, stalked pods.

== Description ==
Acacia capillaris is an erect shrub that typically grows to a height of 0.4 to 1 metre (1 to 3 ft) and has long, soft white hairs about 1 mm (0.039 in) long. Its phyllodes are arranged in whorls of 14 to 18, erect, 5–9 mm (0.20–0.35 in) long and hairy with an almost hooked point on the end. There are spreading, yellowish, bristly stipules 0.3–0.4 mm (0.012–0.016 in) long at the base of the phyllodes. The flowers are borne in heads on hairy peduncles 14–17 mm (0.55–0.67 in) long, each head with 15 to 20 yellow flowers. Flowering has been observed in May, and the pods are linear, flat, and raised over the seeds, 15–40 mm (0.59–1.57 in) long, 4.0–4.5 mm (0.16–0.18 in) wide, brown and glabrous, on a stalk 2–3 mm (0.079–0.118 in) long. Each pod has 2 to 8 elliptic black seeds about 3.5 mm (0.14 in) long.

== Taxonomy ==
Acacia capillaris was first formally described in 1999 by the botanist Alex George in the Journal of the Royal Society of Western Australia from specimens collected in the Wunaamin Miliwundi Ranges in 1988. The specific epithet (capillaris) means 'hair- or thread-like', referring to the fine stipules'.

== Distribution and habitat ==
This species of wattle is found around Mount Bell and Scott Gorge in the Central Kimberley bioregion of Western Australia, often growing on steep rocky slopes or along creek lines in clay soils over granite, under Livistona palms.

== Conservation status ==
Acacia capillaris is listed as "Priority Two" by the Government of Western Australia Department of Biodiversity, Conservation and Attractions, meaning that it is poorly known and from one or a few locations.

== See also ==
- List of Acacia species
