= Mount Barnett Station =

Pastoral lease in Western Australia

Coordinates: 16.656°S 125.951°E

Location in Western Australia

Mount Barnett Station is a pastoral lease that operates as a cattle station in Western Australia.

It is situated approximately 165 kilometres (103 mi) north of Fitzroy Crossing and 253 kilometres (157 mi) east of Derby in the Kimberley region. Manning Creek runs through the property and the tourist destination, Manning Gorge, is also found within the station boundaries. The property is accessed off the Gibb River Road.

The 700,000-acre (283,280 ha) pastoral lease is currently held by the Kupungarri Aboriginal Corporation.

The property had been established prior to 1903 when it was stocked by cattle that were taken from Fitzroy Crossing and across the King Leopold Ranges (modern-day Wunaamin Miliwundi Ranges) in the first drove across the range. In the same year the station was being managed by Mick O'Connor who remained there until at least 1912. In 1912 it was owned by the Rose Brothers. Mount Barnett was one of eight properties located along the Lennard River, all of which were very isolated at the time, and not being serviced by a mail run.

In 1920 it was owned by Ben Copley, who was running cattle. Copley also owned Karbar Station near Yalgoo and had overlanded herds for the 600 miles (966 km) journey.

Fred Merry took over management of the station in the mid 1920s and assisted the police in suppressing the local Aborigines who had been spearing cattle on the property. The station was abandoned soon afterwards after cattle tick had arrived in the area, however pastoral activity has continued in modern times under traditional custodianship.

== See also ==
- List of ranches and stations
- List of pastoral leases in Western Australia
