= HMS Meda (1880) =

History

United Kingdom
- Name: HMS Meda
- Builder: William Westacott Ship Building Company, Barnstaple
- Laid down: 1879
- Launched: 1880
- Acquired: 1880
- Fate: Sold in 1887 to Colony of Western Australia.

- Name: Meda
- Acquired: 1887
- Fate: Sold in 1896 to Wesleyan Board of Missions.

United Kingdom
- Name: Meda
- Acquired: 1896
- Fate: Wrecked on reef near East Cape, New Guinea.

General characteristics
- Type: schooner

HMS Meda was a schooner of the Royal Navy, built by William Westacott Ship Building Company, Barnstaple and purchased by the Royal Navy in 1880.

She commenced service on the Australia Station in 1880 as a survey vessel for hydrographic surveys. She undertook survey work along North West Australia. The Meda River and Meda Passage are named after her. She was sold in 1887 to the Colony of Western Australia.

== Fate ==
She was sold to the Wesleyan Board of Missions in 1896. Meda was wrecked on a reef near East Cape, New Guinea on 14 June 1897.
