= Mount Lyell (Western Australia) =

Mountain in Western Australia

- Location within Western Australia

Highest point
- Elevation: 186 m (610 ft)
- Coordinates: 15°34′40″S 124°57′26″E

Geography
- Location: Kimberley region of Western Australia

Mount Lyell is a mountain located in the Shire of Wyndham-East Kimberley in the Kimberley region of Western Australia.
