= King Sound =

Gulf in Kimberley region of Western Australia

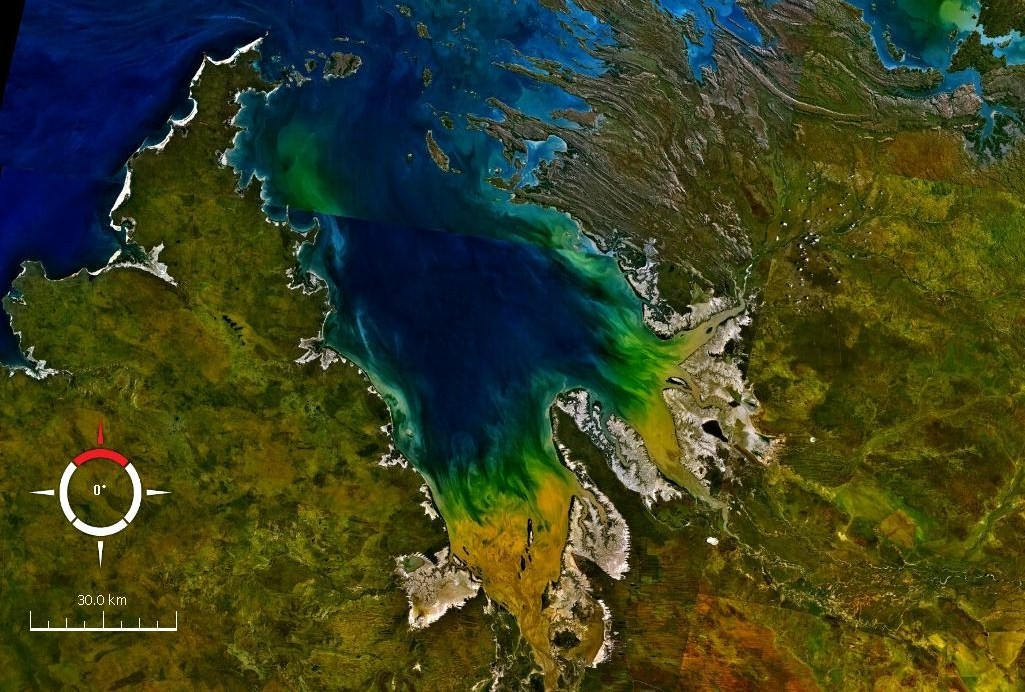
- Landsat image of King Sound using NASA World Wind

- Location within Western Australia
- Coordinates: 16°50′S 123°25′E
- Type: sound
- Part of: Indian Ocean
- River sources: Fitzroy River, Lennard River, Meda River, Robinson River, May River
- Catchment area: 21,315 kilometres (13,245 mi)
- Max. length: 120 kilometres (75 mi)
- Max. width: 50 kilometres (31 mi)
- Max. depth: 50 metres (160 ft)

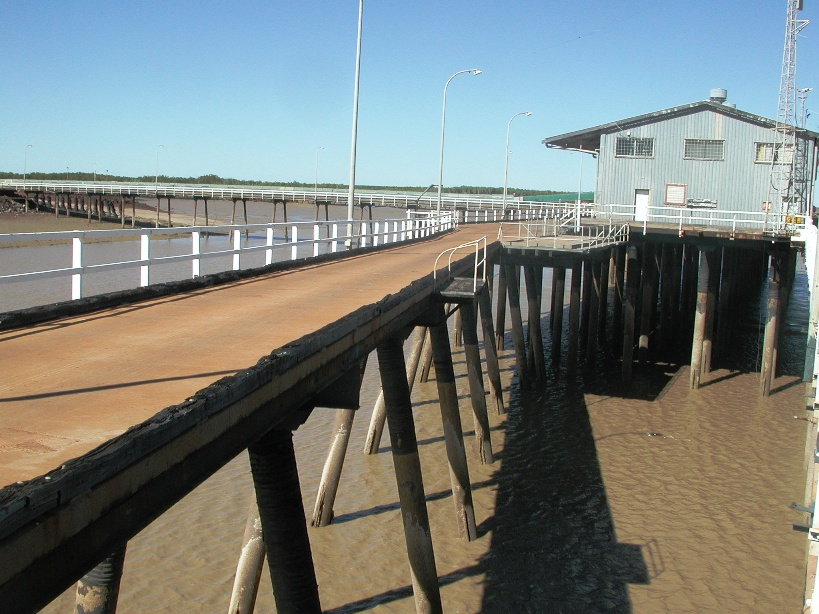
Low tide at the Derby wharf on King Sound

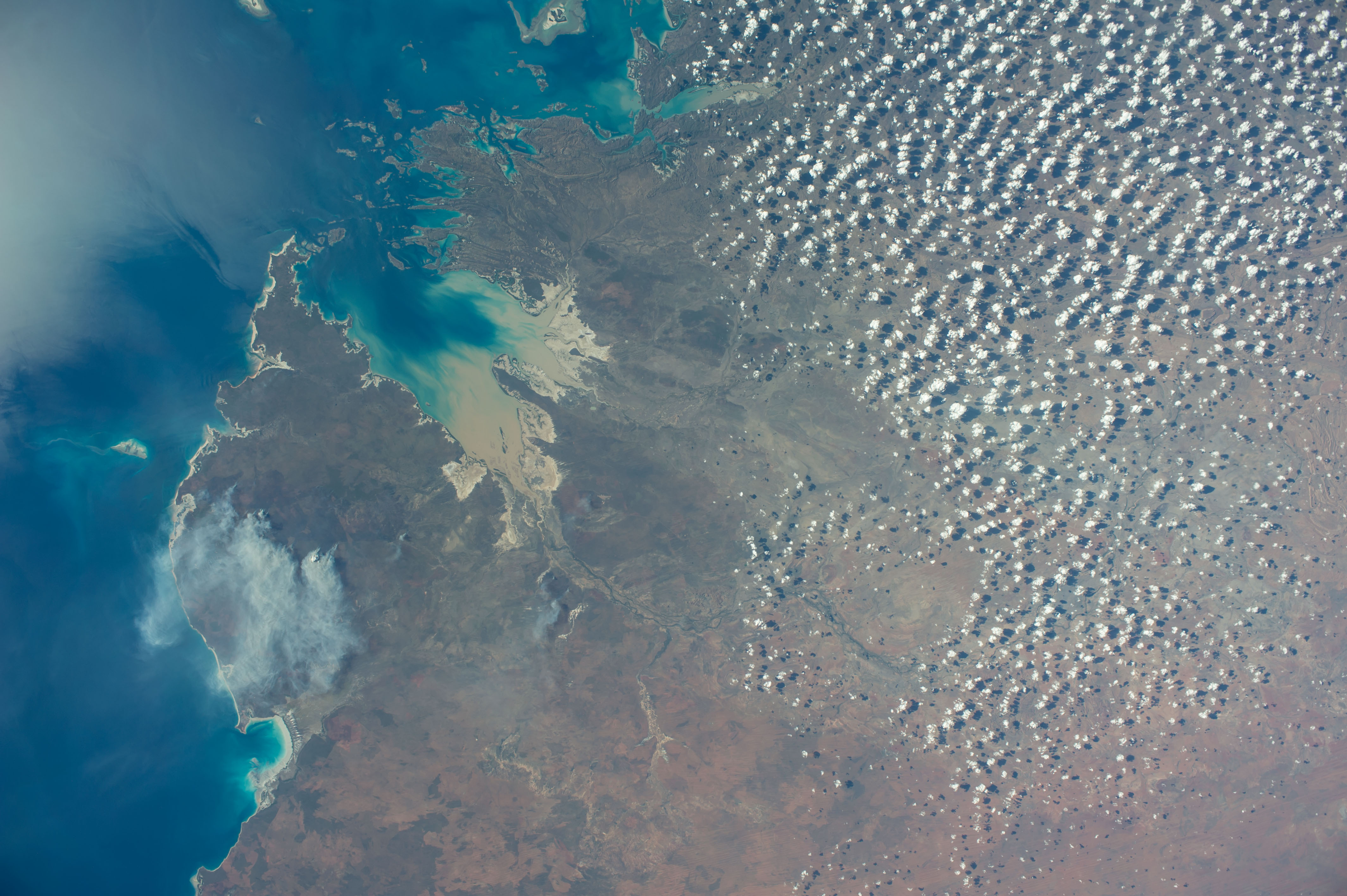
King Sound from International Space Station

King Sound is a large gulf in northern Western Australia. It expands from the mouth of the Fitzroy River, one of Australia's largest watercourses, and opens to the Indian Ocean. It is about 120 kilometres (75 mi) long, and averages about 50 kilometres (31 mi) in width. The port town of Derby lies near the mouth of the Fitzroy River on the eastern shore of King Sound. King Sound has the highest tides in Australia, and amongst the highest in the world, reaching a maximum tidal range of 11.8 metres (39 ft) at Derby. The tidal range and water dynamic were researched in 1997–1998.

Waters within the sound are generally turbid. The turbidity is associated with the erosion of tidal flats.

== Geography ==
Open waters of the sound cover 2,325 km^{2} (898 sq mi). Other rivers that discharge into the sound include the Lennard River, Meda River, Robinson River and May River. King Sound has a catchment area of 21,315 km^{2} (8,230 sq mi). King Sound is part of the Canning Basin. The climate is semi-arid and tropical with a strong monsoonal influence.

King Sound is bordered by the island clusters of the Buccaneer Archipelago to the East and the Dampier Peninsula to the West.

The mean depth of King Sound is 18 metres (59 ft). The mouth of King Sound features a channel that is 50 metres (160 ft) deep and 20 kilometres (12 mi) wide.

== History ==
The traditional owners and original inhabitants of the area are Indigenous Australians, namely the Nimanburu, Njulnjul, and Warwa peoples.

The first European to explore the sound was William Dampier who visited the region aboard Cygnet in 1688.

Noted surveyor Phillip Parker King surveyed the coastline in 1821 and named the area Cygnet Bay. The area was later visited by John Stokes and John Wickham aboard HMS Beagle in 1838. The sound was later named after King.

In the 1880s it was one of the sites in the Kimberleys of a short-lived gold rush.

Doctor’s Creek, in the south of King Sound, has been the site of various proposals for tidal range energy plants since the 1960s. In 2013, the Derby Tidal Power Project from Tidal Energy Australia was given environmental approval. The 40MW tidal power station is expected to cost $375 million to construct.

== See also ==
- List of sounds
