= Meda River =

River in Kimberley region of Western Australia

Coordinates: 16°58′13″S 123°49′34″E

Location
- Country: Australia

Physical characteristics
- Source
  - elevation: 45 metres (148 ft)
- Mouth
  - location: King Sound
  - elevation: sea level
- Length: 88 km (55 mi)
- Basin size: 3,467 km^{2} (1,339 sq mi)

The Meda River is a river in the Kimberley region of Western Australia.

The river is formed when the Lennard River splits into two channels just north of Mount Marmion, the other channel being the May River. Continuing to flow westward the river eventually discharges into Stokes Bay, King Sound which is north-east of Derby.

The river was named in 1881 by a pioneer of the area, George Julius Brockman during an expedition in the Kimberley area. The river is named after HMS Meda, an Admiralty surveying vessel that charted the coastline in the area including the river mouth in 1880.

The traditional owners of the areas around the river are the Ongkarango people.

The Meda has three tributaries, the Lennard River, May River and Hawkstone Creek.
