= Bunuba =

Traditional peoples of the southern West Kimberley

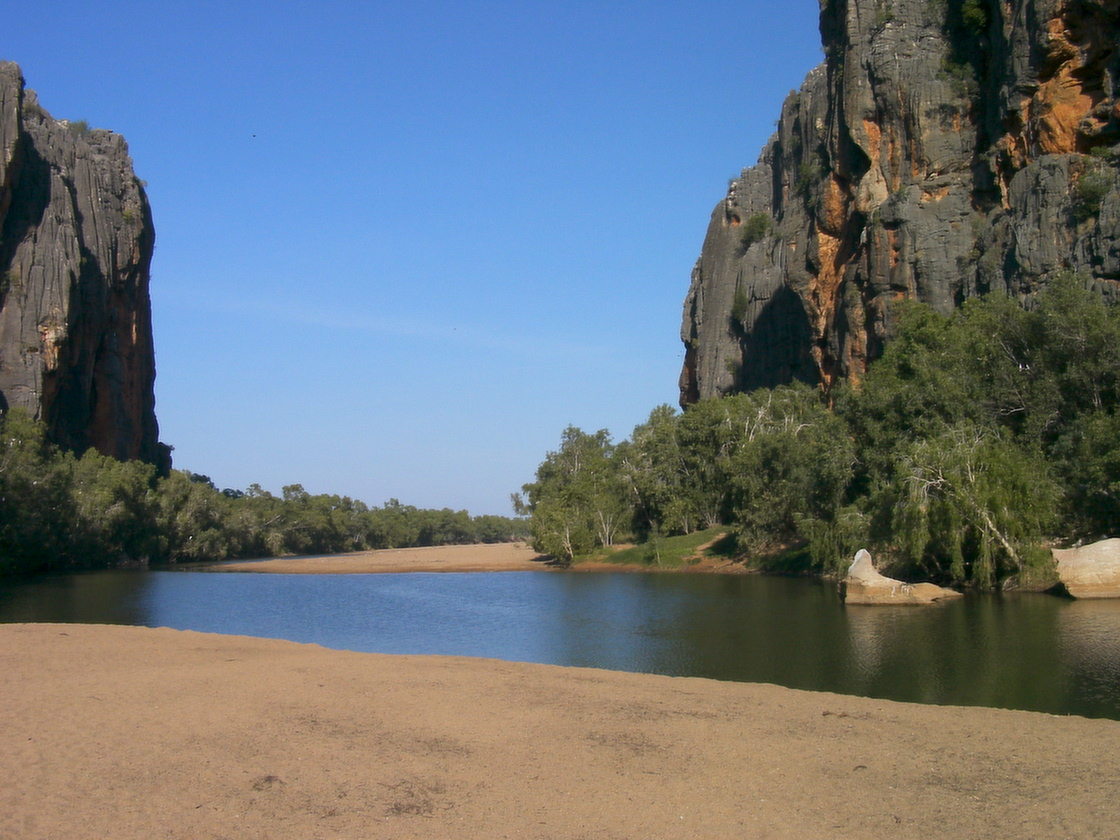
Windjana Gorge in Bunuba Country

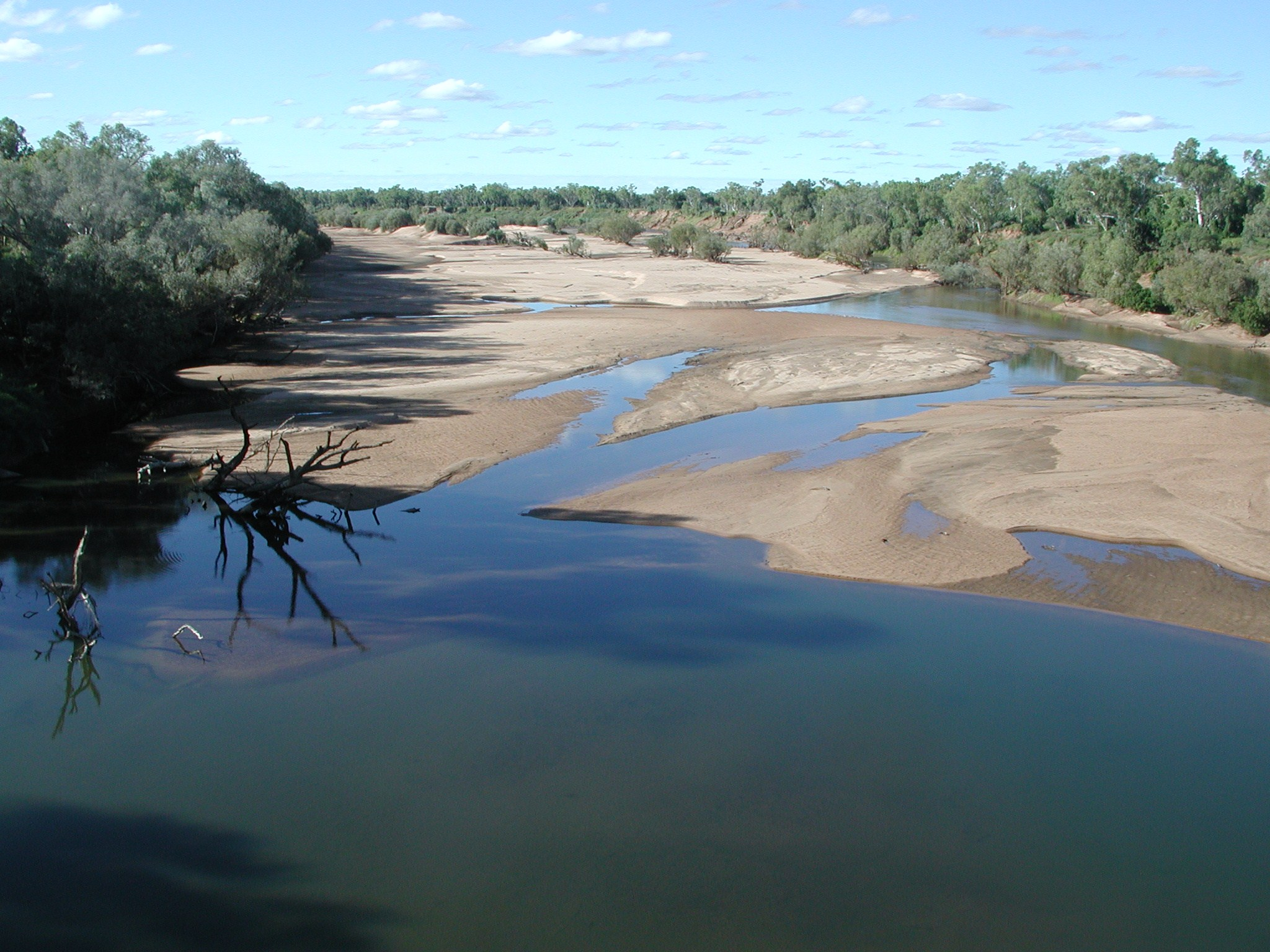
Fitzroy River in Bunuba Country

The Bunuba (also known as Bunaba, Punapa, Punuba) are a group of Indigenous Australians and are one of the traditional owners of the southern West Kimberley, in Western Australia. Many now live in and around the town of Fitzroy Crossing.

== Language ==
Bunuba is one of only two members of the Bunuban language family.

== Country ==
The Bunuba's traditional territory extended over some 2,500 square miles (6,500 km^{2}). The northern frontier ran along the Lady Forrest Range. To the west, it reached as far as Mount Broome, and ran along the Richenda River as far as the Granite Range and Mount Percy. Its southeastern boundary lay along the Oscar Range as far as Brooking Springs. It also encompassed the Geikie Gorge and Stony Creek's headwaters in the northeast. The Bunuba were also masters of the eastern part of the Wunaamin Miliwundi Ranges, at least until the Ngarinjin managed to expel them from that territory, sometime before the advent of white settlement.

== History of contact ==
As white penetration and appropriation of their lands advanced, the pastoralists began to press the government to take strong measures against the presence of "blacks" on their property, some of whom they would nonetheless employ during the dry season. A resistance movement eventually emerged, in the mid 1890s, when the Bunuba leader Jandamarra, nicknamed "Pigeon", from a base in Tunnel Creek in the Oscar Ranges, organized guerrilla warfare forays against the intruding cattle- and sheepmen. Jandamarra himself had formerly been enlisted by white authorities to hunt down an earlier Bunuba resistance leader Ellemarra. A crackdown under Inspector Lawrence led to killings among, and the "dispersion" of, many communities, some of the victims being also Gooniyandi. Jandamarra was killed in 1897, but sporadic attacks continued on livestock, and massacres of the indigenous population persisted, one being said to have taken place as late as the 1930s.

== Modern period ==
The Bunuba acquired Leopold Downs and Fairfield Downs stations in 1991. Together the properties occupy an area of 5,700 square kilometres (2,201 sq mi). In 2012, after the collapse of their Indonesian market, the Bunuba entered into an agreement with the Australian Agricultural Company where AACo would manage the operations and the Bunuba would receive an annual rent and training opportunities and have complete access to their lands.

== Alternative names ==
- Bunaba
- Punamba (Ngarinjin exonym)
- Kunamba (derogatory exonym, formed by kuna. meaning "dung")
- Bunapa, Booneba

== Notable Bunuba ==
- Jandamarra, who led one of the few organised armed insurrections documented against European settlement in Australia
- June Oscar, winner of the 2018 National NAIDOC "Person of the Year" award

== Sources ==
- "AIATSIS map of Indigenous Australia". AIATSIS. 14 May 2024.
- Brann, Matt (17 July 2012). "AAco enters into cattle deal with Indigenous stations". Australian Broadcasting Corporation.
- Carter, Bridget (4 October 2012). "AAco gets new foothold as cattle station sold". The Australian.
- Kaberry, Phyllis M. (June 1935). "The Forrest River and Lyne River Tribes of North-West Australia: A Report on Field Work". Oceania. 5 (4): 408–436. doi:10.1002/j.1834-4461.1935.tb00163.x. JSTOR 40327811.
- Kaberry, Phyllis M. (June 1937). "Subsections in the East and South Kimberley Tribes of North-West Australia". Oceania. 7 (4): 436–458. doi:10.1002/j.1834-4461.1937.tb00397.x. JSTOR 40327647.
- McGregor, William (1990). A Functional Grammar of Gooniyandi. John Benjamins Publishing. ISBN 978-9-027-23025-6.
- Neales, Sue (17 July 2012). "Indigenous land deal to share cattle profits". The Australian.
- Seal, Graham (2011). Outlaw Heroes in Myth and History. Anthem Press. ISBN 978-0-857-28792-2.
- "Tindale Tribal Boundaries" (PDF). Department of Aboriginal Affairs, Western Australia. September 2016. Archived from the original (PDF) on 8 March 2016.
- Tindale, Norman Barnett (1974). "Punaba (WA)". Aboriginal Tribes of Australia: Their Terrain, Environmental Controls, Distribution, Limits, and Proper Names. Australian National University. ISBN 978-0-708-10741-6. Archived from the original on 20 March 2020.
