= Robinson River (Western Australia) =

River in Western Australia

Coordinates: 16°49′14″S 123°57′03″E

Location
- Country: Australia

Physical characteristics
- Source
  - elevation: 152 metres (499 ft)
- Mouth
  - location: Stokes Bay
  - elevation: sea level
- Length: 107 km (66 mi)
- Basin size: 3,329 km^{2} (1,285 sq mi)

The Robinson River is a river in the Kimberley region of Western Australia.

The headwaters of the river rise below the Van Emmerick Range and then flow in a westerly direction through Moondoma Yards, Holmans Crossing and Oombagooma before discharging into the Indian Ocean via Stokes Bay approximately 50 kilometres (31 mi) north of Derby.

There are six tributaries to the Robinson River, including Keightly River, Mondooma Creek, Pardaboora River, Tarraji River and Townshend River.
