= Lennard River =

River in Kimberley region of Western Australia

Coordinates: 17°21′22″S 124°20′0″E

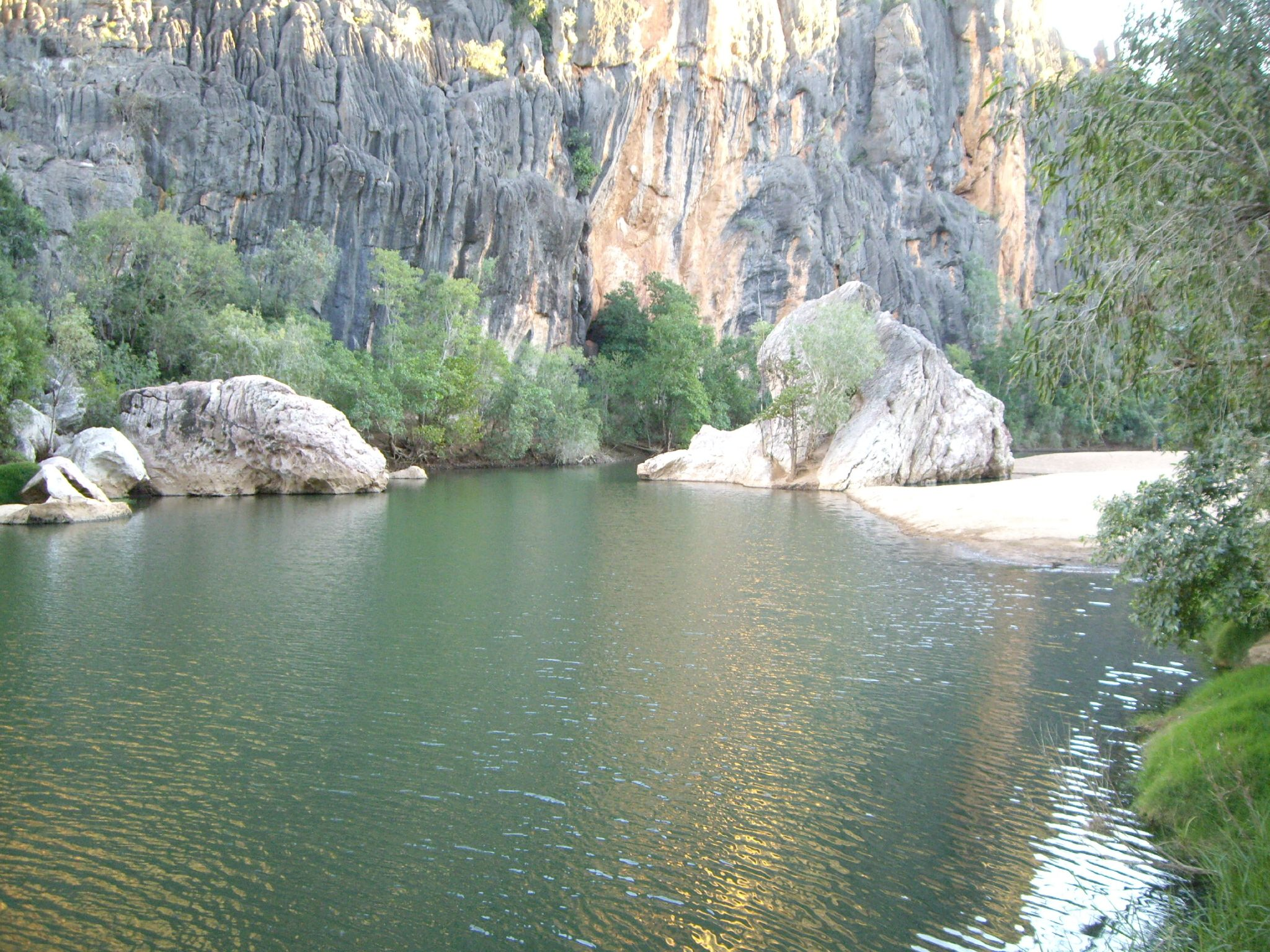
- Lennard River, Windjana Gorge

Location
- Country: Australia

Physical characteristics
- Source
  - location: Wunaamin Miliwundi Ranges
  - elevation: 342 metres (1,122 ft)
- Mouth
  - location: Meda River and May River
  - elevation: 41 metres (135 ft)
- Length: 180 kilometres (112 mi)
- Basin size: 14,757 square kilometres (5,698 sq mi)

Lennard River is a river in the Kimberley region of Western Australia. The river was named on 8 June 1879 by the explorer Alexander Forrest, during an expedition in the Kimberley area, after Amy Eliza Barrett-Lennard (1852–1897), who he was to marry on 15 January 1880.

The river rises below the Wunaamin Miliwundi Ranges and flows in a westerly direction through the Lennard River Gorge and the Windjana Gorge before merging with the Meda River. The tributaries of the Lennard River include Barker River, Richenda River, Mount North Creek, Surprise Creek and Broome Creek.

The river has a length of 180 kilometres (112 mi) and a catchment area of 14,757 square kilometres (5,698 sq mi).

The traditional owners of the area that the river flows through are the Unggumi people.
