= Fitzroy River (Western Australia) =

River in Western Australia

Coordinates: 17°25′39″S 123°33′52″E

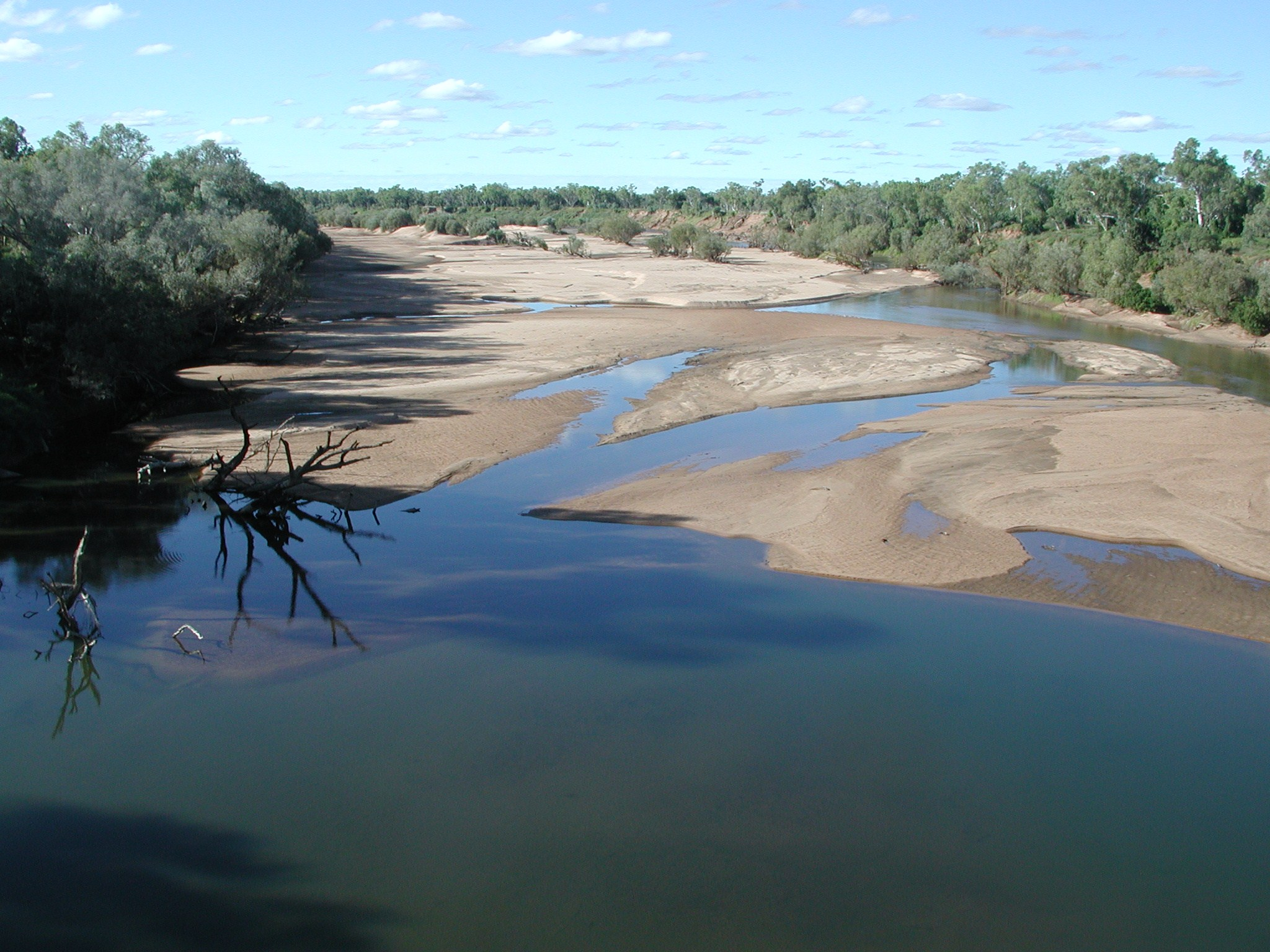
- Fitzroy River, looking north from bridge at Fitzroy Crossing

Location
- Country: Australia

Physical characteristics
- Source
  - location: Wunaamin Miliwundi Ranges
  - elevation: 486 metres (1,594 ft)
- Mouth
  - location: King Sound
- Length: 733 kilometres (455 mi)
- Basin size: 93,829 square kilometres (36,228 sq mi)
- Discharge
  - average: 84.78 cubic metres per second (2,994 cu ft/s)

The Fitzroy River, also known as Martuwarra, is located in the West Kimberley region of Western Australia. It has 20 tributaries and its catchment occupies an area of 93,829 square kilometres (36,228 sq mi), within the Canning Basin and the Timor Sea drainage division.

It often floods extensively during the wet season, and is known as the major remaining habitat for the critically endangered largetooth sawfish.

== History ==
=== Pre-colonisation ===
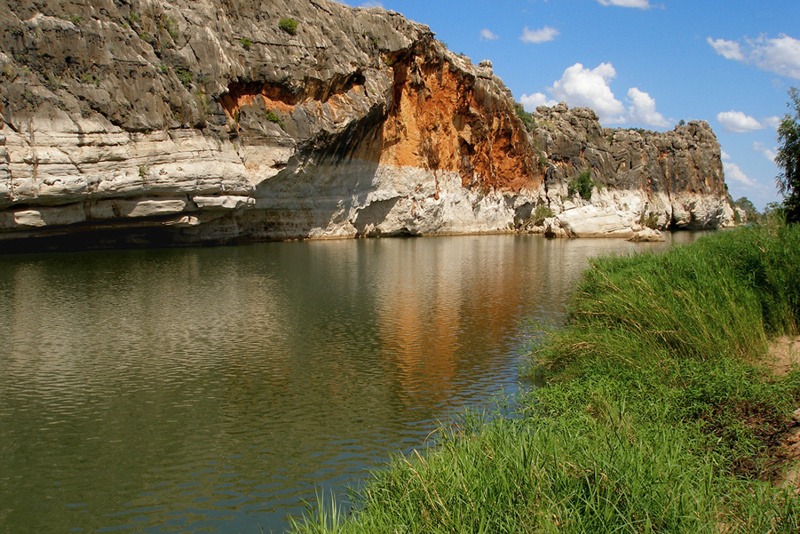
Fitzroy River flowing through Geikie Gorge

The first people to live along the river were the traditional owners of the areas around the river, including the Bunuba and Nyikina people to the west, and the Walmajarri and Gooniyandi people to the east, who have lived in the area for at least 40,000 years.

The Nyikina and Bunuba people know the river as Martuwarra (formerly also spelt Mardoowarra) and Bandaral Ngarri respectively. The river and its vast floodplains are of great spiritual, cultural, medicinal, and ecological significance.

=== 19th to 21st centuries ===
The first European to visit the Fitzroy River was George Grey in 1837 aboard HMS Beagle. The river was subsequently given its European name by Lieutenant John Lort Stokes in February 1838 after Captain Robert FitzRoy R.N.

The first non-indigenous settlement that appeared along the river was Yeeda Station, settled in 1880. The initial owners of the station were the Murray Squatting Company composed of William Paterson, George Paterson, Hamlet Cornish and Alexander Richardson. The company took up the property in the newly opened West Kimberley in 1880 and established the station with both cattle and sheep.

Sandy Billabong, near Yungngora community

Other stations were established along the river further upstream during the 1880s including Noonkanbah Station, Gogo Station, Fossil Downs Station, Liveringa, and Lower Liveringa Station.

== Physiography ==
The surrounding area is also known as the Fitzroy Valley and is a distinct physiographic section of the larger Canning Basin province, which in turn is part of the larger West Australian Shield division.

== Tributaries and catchment area ==
The Fitzroy River flows for 733 kilometres (455 mi) from the Wunaamin-Miliwundi and Mueller Ranges into King Sound south of Derby. The catchment area occupies an area of 93,829 square kilometres (36,228 sq mi) and is situated within the Canning Basin and the Timor Sea drainage division extending from Halls Creek and the Wunaamin Miliwundi Ranges in the east through to Derby and King Sound to the west.

The Fitzroy has 20 tributaries, including Margaret River, Christmas Creek, Hann River, Sandy Creek, Geegully Creek, Little Fitzroy River, Collis Creek, Adcock River, Cunninghame River, Yeeda River, Mudjalla Gully, and Minnie River.

It flows through three shires: Wyndham-East Kimberley, Halls Creek and Derby-West Kimberley are found within the catchment area. The two main population centres of Derby and Fitzroy Crossing and 57 smaller Aboriginal communities are also found in the watershed making it home to about 7,000 people of which 80% are Aboriginal. The catchment area of the Fitzroy river was found in 2012 to be extensively pegged by mineral exploration companies

Most of the land is under pastoral lease holding with about 44 mostly cattle stations operating within the catchment area. Some of the properties include: Mount Elizabeth, Mount Barnett, Glenroy, Mornington Sanctuary, Bedford Downs, Ruby Plains and Springvale to the east. Noonkanbah, Cherrabun, Gogo, Louisa Downs, Fossil Downs and Leopold Downs are found in the central part. To the west are properties including Liveringa, Myroodah, Mount Anderson, Mowla Bluff, Yakka Munga, and Yeeda Stations.

== Flooding ==
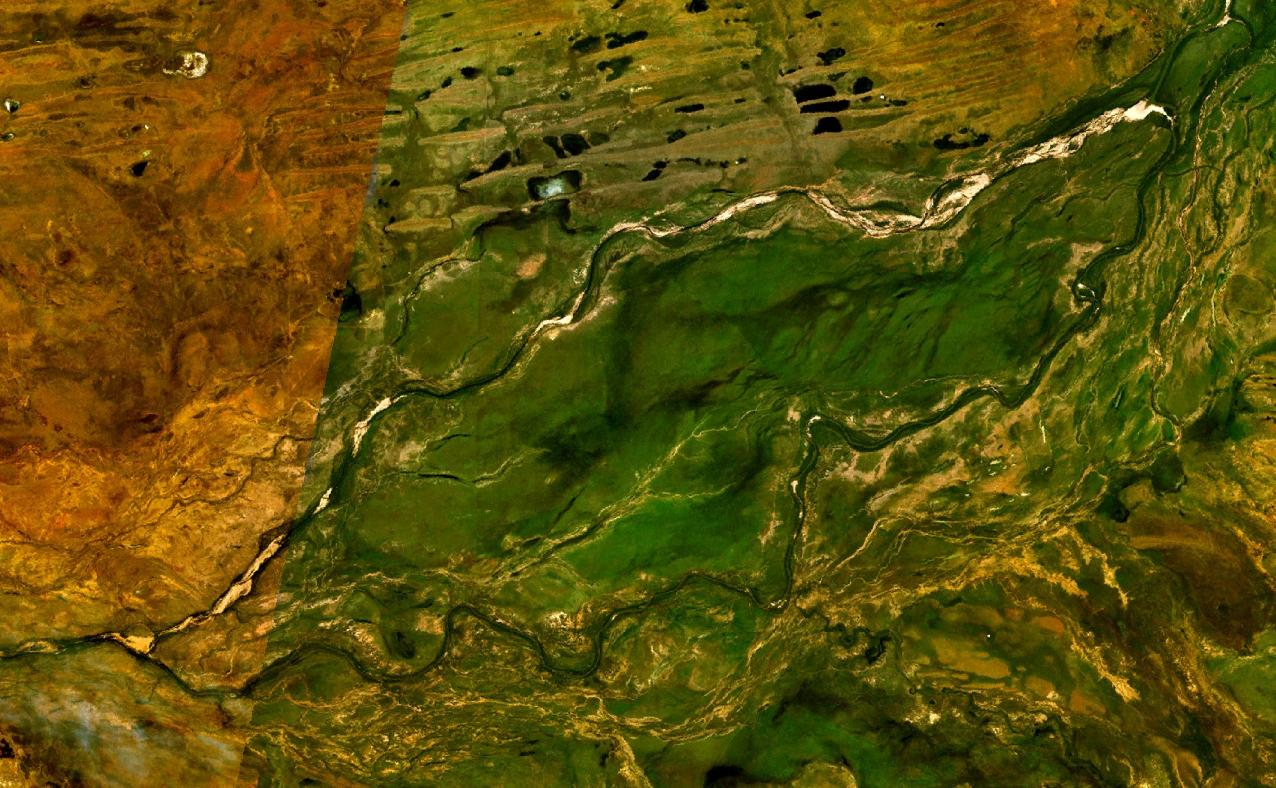
Alexander Island in the Fitzroy River

Extensive flooding during the wet season created a need for an adequate crossing. It was because of this that the town of Fitzroy Crossing was founded.

Flooding occurred along the river six times from 1892 to 1903. The 1903 flood washed away telegraph lines and "great numbers of cattle and sheep were drowned", with bodies of animals later found hanging in trees. The heavy rains experienced in the area were the remnants of a cyclone.

In 1935, the Fitzroy got its first bridge – a low-level concrete structure at Fitzroy Crossing, which was built up into a wider structure in 1958. This bridge could be closed for several months at a time during the wet weather and travellers were then forced to use a flying fox, which operated about 200 metres south of the crossing. When a new bridge was erected in 1974, the focus of the town grew away from its original site. In January 2023, this bridge was heavily damaged and partially collapsed after record floods. It was replaced by a larger, sturdier bridge in December 2023.

The current town of Fitzroy Crossing is one of the fastest growing in the Kimberley region. Over 80% of its population are Aboriginal. The river flooded after heavy rain events in 1949 and 1954. The 1954 event came immediately after a drought and the swollen river washed away stock from both Noonkanbah and Liveringa Station. At the height of the flood the river level was 10 feet (3 m) above the low level crossing. The mouth of the river was estimated at being over 7 miles (11 km) wide as it discharged the floodwaters.

Record floods occurred in 1983, 1986, 2002, and 2023 with approximately 13 to 15 metres of water over the old concrete crossing. The flow rate down the 15 km-wide flood plain at Fitzroy Crossing was estimated to be 60,000 cubic metres per second, making it the biggest rush of water in any river in Australia in recorded history.

== Damming ==
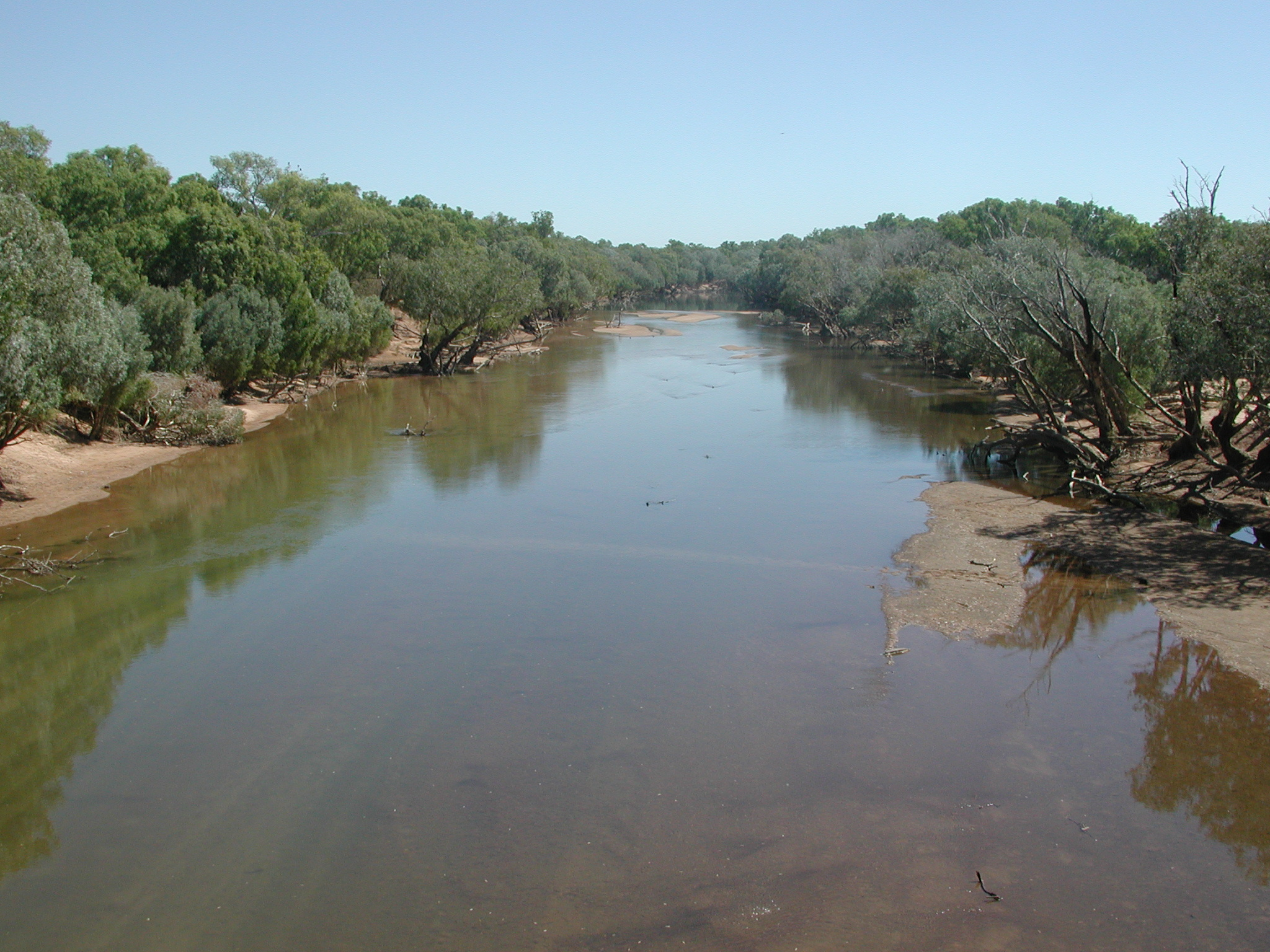
One channel of the Fitzroy River, looking north from Willare Bridge, dry season 2006

The Fitzroy River was diverted in the 1950s as part of the failed Camballin Irrigation Scheme to store the water to irrigate crops of cotton, sorghum and other feed crops. This part of the river covers an area of 12 hectares (30 acres) when full.

== Ecology ==
The Fitzroy has been called the "world's last stronghold" for the critically endangered sawfish. In December 2018, the largest mass fish deaths since the monitoring of the fish in the Fitzroy River occurred. Associate Professor David Morgan of Murdoch University said that the fish had died due to heat and a severe lack of rainfall during a poor wet season. They also become more vulnerable to predators such as crocodiles when water levels are low. This raised concerns about plans by Gina Rinehart to divert water on her Liveringa property.
