= Wunaamin Miliwundi Ranges =

Mountain range in Kimberley region of Western Australia

Coordinates: 17°30′S 125°45′E

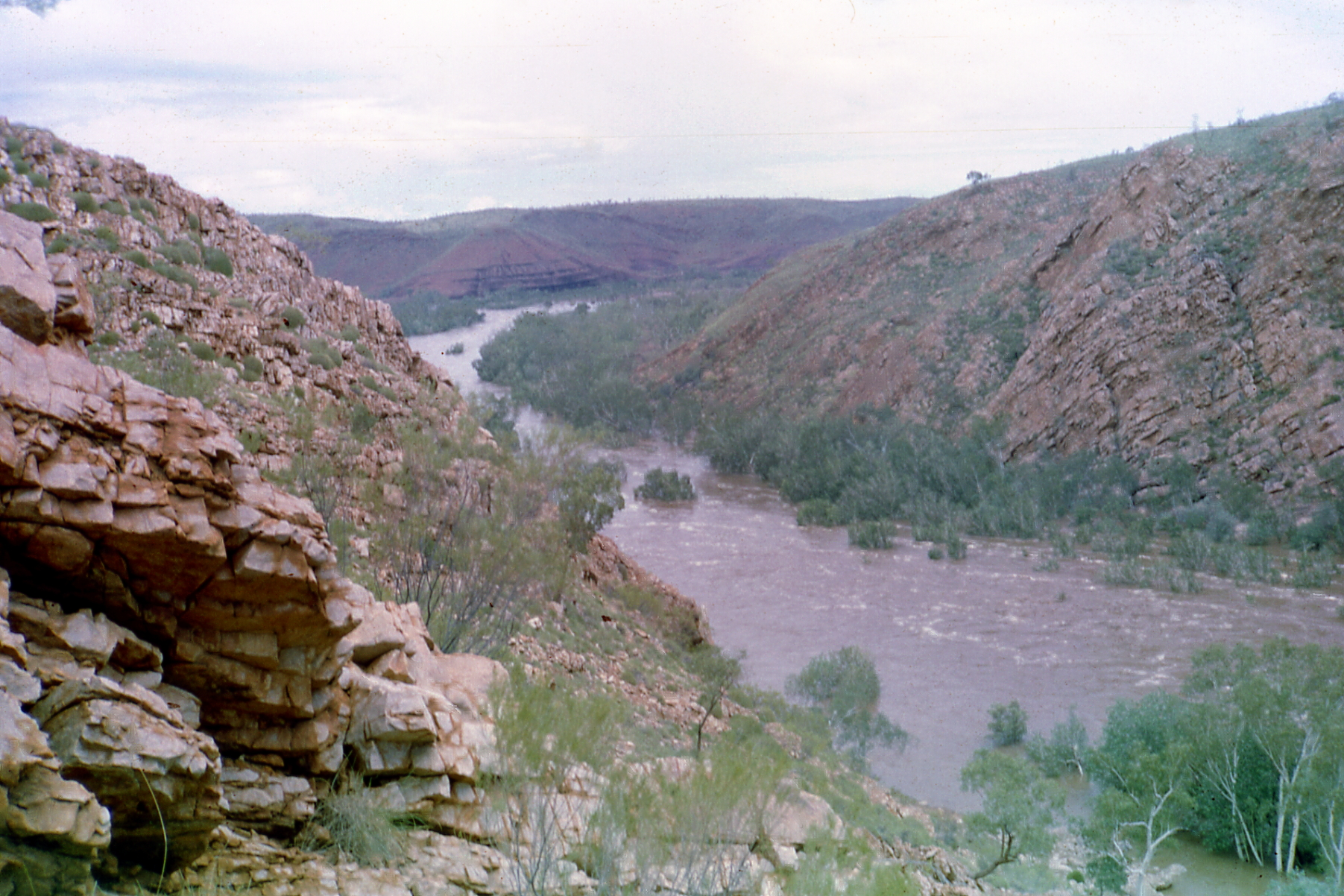
Margaret River where it cuts through the range

The Wunaamin Miliwundi Ranges (between 1879 and 2020 known as the King Leopold Ranges) are a range of hills in the western Kimberley region of Western Australia.

There are two conservation parks within the ranges, the Wunaamin Conservation Park (in Wilinggin land) and Miluwindi Conservation Park (in Bunuba land), both formerly part of the King Leopold Ranges Conservation Park.

== Name ==
The European name, King Leopold Ranges, was given to the range on 6 June 1879 by the explorer Alexander Forrest, during an expedition in the Kimberley area, after King Leopold II of Belgium, "for the great interest taken by His Majesty in exploration".

There followed several proposals and attempts to rename the range, given its link to Leopold II of Belgium, whose reign over the Congo Free State beginning in 1885 is claimed to have resulted in the deaths of 10 to 15 million African people. Leopold had no connection with Western Australia, but a number of geographic features in the Pilbara and Kimberley were named after European royalty. Renaming was proposed in 2008, and again in 2017.

However, with the range spanning several different regions and native title claimant areas, negotiations with traditional owners to decide a name were complicated. In 2020, prompted by the removal of a statue of Leopold II in the city of Antwerp as part of a reconsideration of various names throughout the world, Lands Minister Ben Wyatt stated that he hoped to establish consensus on a name, with the two main native title groups and would then quickly proceed with the name change. The range was officially renamed as the Wunaamin Miliwundi Ranges on 1 July 2020 by Wyatt.

== Physiography ==
The ranges are a distinct physiographic section of the larger Kimberley Block province, which in turn is part of the larger West Australian Shield division. The Wunnaamin Miliwundi Range is made up of many smaller ranges including; Lady Forrest Range, Isdell Range, Narrie Range, Sir John Range, Precipice Range and Durack Range. Nearby features include Mount Hart, Bell Gorge, Silent Grove and Lennard Gorge as well as the Napier Range and Queen Victoria's Head granite outcrop. Fitzroy Bluff is formed where the Fitzroy River carves through the area. The ranges separate the main Kimberley plateau from the southern Fitzroy plains and consist of quartz sandstone intruded by dolerite. The ranges are shaped like a crescent with a length of 567 kilometres (352 mi) running from the northern end of the Durack Range in the East to east of Secure Bay in the West Kimberley. The range is estimated to cover a total area of 30,794 square kilometres (11,890 sq mi). The area has an average height 600 metres (1,969 ft). The highest point is found at Mount Wells which is 983 metres (3,225 ft) above mean sea level. The next two highest peaks are Mount Ord at 936 metres (3,071 ft) and Mount Broome at 927 metres (3,041 ft).

== History ==
The traditional owners of the area are the Ngarinjin, Konejandi and Bunuba peoples.

Cattle were first overlanded across the range in 1903. Leaving from Fitzroy Crossing and used to stock Mount Barnett Station, the trip took over six weeks to complete.

== Management ==
Crossed by the Gibb River Road about 134 km (83 mi) east of Derby, part of the ranges are covered by the 3,921 km^{2} (1,514 sq mi) Miluwindi Conservation Park and the Wunaamin Conservation Park (both formerly part of King Leopold Range Conservation Park), managed by the Department of Parks and Wildlife.

Camping is permitted at Mount Hart Station, Bell Creek or at Silent Grove.
