= Kimberley (Western Australia) =

- Region
- Interactive map of Kimberley
- Coordinates: 17.49145°S 124.53265°E
- Country: Australia
- State: Western Australia
- LGAs: Shire of Broome; Shire of Derby–West Kimberley; Shire of Wyndham–East Kimberley; Shire of Halls Creek
- Established: 1881

Government
  - State electorate: Kimberley
  - Federal division: Durack

Area
  - Total: 423,517 km^{2} (163,521 sq mi)

Population
  - Total: 34,364 (2016 census)
  - Density: 0.0811396/km^{2} (0.210151/sq mi)

The Kimberley is the northernmost of the nine regions of Western Australia. It is bordered on the west by the Indian Ocean, on the north by the Timor Sea, on the south by the Great Sandy and Tanami deserts in the region of the Pilbara, and on the east by the Northern Territory.

The region was named in 1879 by government surveyor Alexander Forrest after Secretary of State for the Colonies John Wodehouse, 1st Earl of Kimberley.

== History ==
The Kimberley was one of the earliest settled parts of Australia, with the first humans landing about 65,000 years ago. They created a complex culture that developed over thousands of years. Yam (Dioscorea hastifolia) agriculture was developed, and rock art suggests that this was where some of the earliest boomerangs were invented. The worship of Wandjina deities was most common in this region, and a complex theology dealing with the transmigration of souls was part of the local people's religious philosophy.

During the 18th century, Dutch explorers named the region of Kimberley and nearby Darwin variations of Van Diemen's Land after the VOC governor-general Anthony van Diemen. This should not be confused with the more general and prolonged use of the same name for Tasmania. The area is also not to be confused with Kimberley in South Africa, the site of a major diamond rush in the 19th century.

In 1837, with expedition support from the Royal Geographical Society of Great Britain, Lieutenants George Grey and Franklin Lushington and 12 men sailed on the schooner Lynher from Cape Town, South Africa. They reached Hanover Bay on 2 December 1837. The exploring party started inland on 19 January 1838. Leaders and men were inexperienced, their progress was delayed by the flooded country, and they abandoned many stores along the way. The party was constantly split up although they had to contend with large numbers of hostile Aboriginals. On 11 February, Grey was speared near the hip, during a skirmish with Indigenous Australians; the injury made him critically ill, and left him with a lifelong limp, but, after two weeks, he continued the exploration. The party found and named the Gairdner River, the Glenelg River, the Stephen and Whately ranges and Mount Lyell before returning to Hanover Bay in April. There they were picked up by HMS Beagle and Lynher and taken to Mauritius to recuperate.

In 1879, Western Australian government surveyor Alexander Forrest led a party of seven from the west coast at Beagle Bay to Katherine, Northern Territory. Forrest explored and named the Kimberley district, the Margaret and Ord Rivers and the King Leopold Ranges (now the Wunaamin-Miliwundi Ranges), and located well-watered pastoral lands along the Fitzroy and Ord rivers. He subsequently set himself up as a land agent specialising in the Kimberley during a period to 1883 when over 21,000,000 hectares (51,000,000 acres) of land were taken up as pastoral leaseholds in the region.

In 1881, Philip Saunders and Adam Johns, in the face of great difficulties and dangers, found gold in various parts of the Kimberley. Early in 1881, the first five graziers, who called themselves the Murray Squatting Company, took up 49,000 hectares (120,000 acres) behind Beagle Bay and named it Yeeda Station. In 1883 they were the first men to shear sheep in the southern Kimberley. Additional Anglo-European settlement occurred in 1885 when ranchers drove cattle across Australia from the eastern states in search of good pasture lands. After gold was discovered around Halls Creek, many other erstwhile European miners arrived rapidly.

In the 1890s, the area was the site of an armed insurrection of indigenous people led by Jandamarra, a Bunuba warrior.

During World War II, when Australia was among the nations at war with the Axis powers, the Japanese invaded the nation with only a small reconnaissance party in the Kimberley on 19 January 1944; they were investigating reports that the Allies were building large bases in the region. Four Japanese officers were on board a small fishing boat. They investigated the York Sound region for a day and a night before returning to Kupang in Timor on 20 January. After returning to Japan in February, the junior officer, who had commanded the party, suggested using 200 Japanese prison inmates to launch a guerrilla campaign in Australia. No superior adopted his suggestion, and the officer was posted to other duties.

From 1983 to 2020 the Argyle diamond mine operated in the eastern part of the Kimberley.

== Demographics ==
The 2011 estimated permanent population of Kimberley was 34,794 but it rises dramatically during winter when it attracts a seasonal population. On Census night in 2011 (9 August), it was 50,113. The population is fairly evenly distributed, with only three towns having populations over 2,000: Broome (12,766), Derby (3,261), and Kununurra (4,573). Approximately 40% of the region's population is of Aboriginal descent.

=== Urban centres and localities ===
Rank	UCL	LGA	Population									
Rank	UCL	LGA	2001 census	Ref.	2006 census	Ref.	2011 census	Ref.	2016 census	Ref.	2021 census	Ref.
1	Broome	Broome	15,242		11,547		12,766		13,984		14,660	
2	Kununurra	Wyndham–East Kimberley	5,219		3,748		4,573		4,341		4,515	
3	Derby	Derby–West Kimberley	3,662		3,093		3,261		3,325		3,009	
4	Halls Creek	Halls Creek	1,264		1,211		1,443		1,546		1,605	
5	Fitzroy Crossing	Derby–West Kimberley	1,450		928		1,144		1,141		1,022	
6	Wyndham	Wyndham–East Kimberley	784		669		787		604		745	
7	Bidyadanga (La Grange)	Broome	510		425		595		617		593	
8	Balgo	Halls Creek	456		460		508		359		472	
9	Warmun	Halls Creek	315		210		297		366		457	
10	Yungngora	Derby–West Kimberley	245		288		283		409		434	
11	Looma	Derby–West Kimberley	285		393		374		531		412	
12	Kalumburu	Wyndham–East Kimberley	335		413		467		412		388	
13	Bardi (One Arm Point)	Broome	310		214		334		365		325	
14	Bayulu	Derby–West Kimberley	253		259		320		322		308	
15	Beagle Bay	Broome	293		199		285		348		307	
16	Djarindjin–Lombadina	Broome	—N/a		—N/a		245		395		253	
17	Wangkatjungka	Derby–West Kimberley	—N/a		—N/a		—N/a		254		231	
18	Mindibungu	Halls Creek	215		144		257		150		202	

== Indigenous languages ==
The Kimberley has been noted as a region of great linguistic diversity, rivalled in Australia only by the Top End. Depending on the geographical boundaries of The Kimberley, and the definition of what constitutes a "language" (as opposed to a "dialect"), about 50–60 Aboriginal languages were once spoken in this region. The vast majority of these do not belong to the family of Pama-Nyungan languages. Four endemic, primary language families are recognised within the core Kimberley region:

- Nyulnyulan languages, including languages spoken on the Dampier Peninsula and along the Fitzroy River
- Bunuban languages, including languages spoken in the Fitzroy River Basin
- Worrorran languages, including languages spoken in the northern Kimberley, north of King Sound, up to Wyndham
- Jarrakan languages, including languages spoken along the Ord River, from Halls Creek up to Wyndham and Kununurra.

Pama-Nyungan languages spoken in and around the Kimberley region include the Marrngu languages (such as Karajarri and Nyangumarta, the Ngumpin languages (such as Walmajarri and Jaru), the Yapa languages (such as Warlpiri) and the Western Desert languages (including Wangkajunga and Kukatja). Non-Pama-Nyungan languages spoken around the Kimberleys (but speakers of which today live within the Kimberley) include the Daly language Murrinh-Patha and Western Mirndi language Jaminjung.

Presently, many indigenous languages are no longer spoken daily. In addition to Australian English, post-contact languages spoken in the Kimberley include Aboriginal English, Kriol, Pidgin English and the Malay-based Broome Pearling Lugger Pidgin (not spoken daily any more).

== Politics ==
At the federal level, Kimberley is represented by the member for Durack. At the state level, the Kimberley electorate takes in all of the region and its towns.

The Kimberley region consists of the local government areas of Broome, Derby-West Kimberley, Halls Creek and Wyndham-East Kimberley.

== Art ==
The Kimberley region is extremely rich in art, mainly that of Indigenous rock art. Considering the area's size, it is no surprise that there are tens of thousands of rock art examples coming from a variety of different cultural groups within the region. The diversity of peoples has allowed for many different art styles to develop with some of the most widely known examples being Wandjina and Gwion Gwion. In addition to the variation in styles, there are almost equally diverse fabrication techniques. The earliest form of Kimberley rock art was hand stencils, but techniques such as engraving, painting, scratchwork, pecking, drawing, and later beeswax applique have also been used. In addition to the varying styles and techniques, there are united visual depictions that reflect the changes and persistence within the cultural and natural environment.

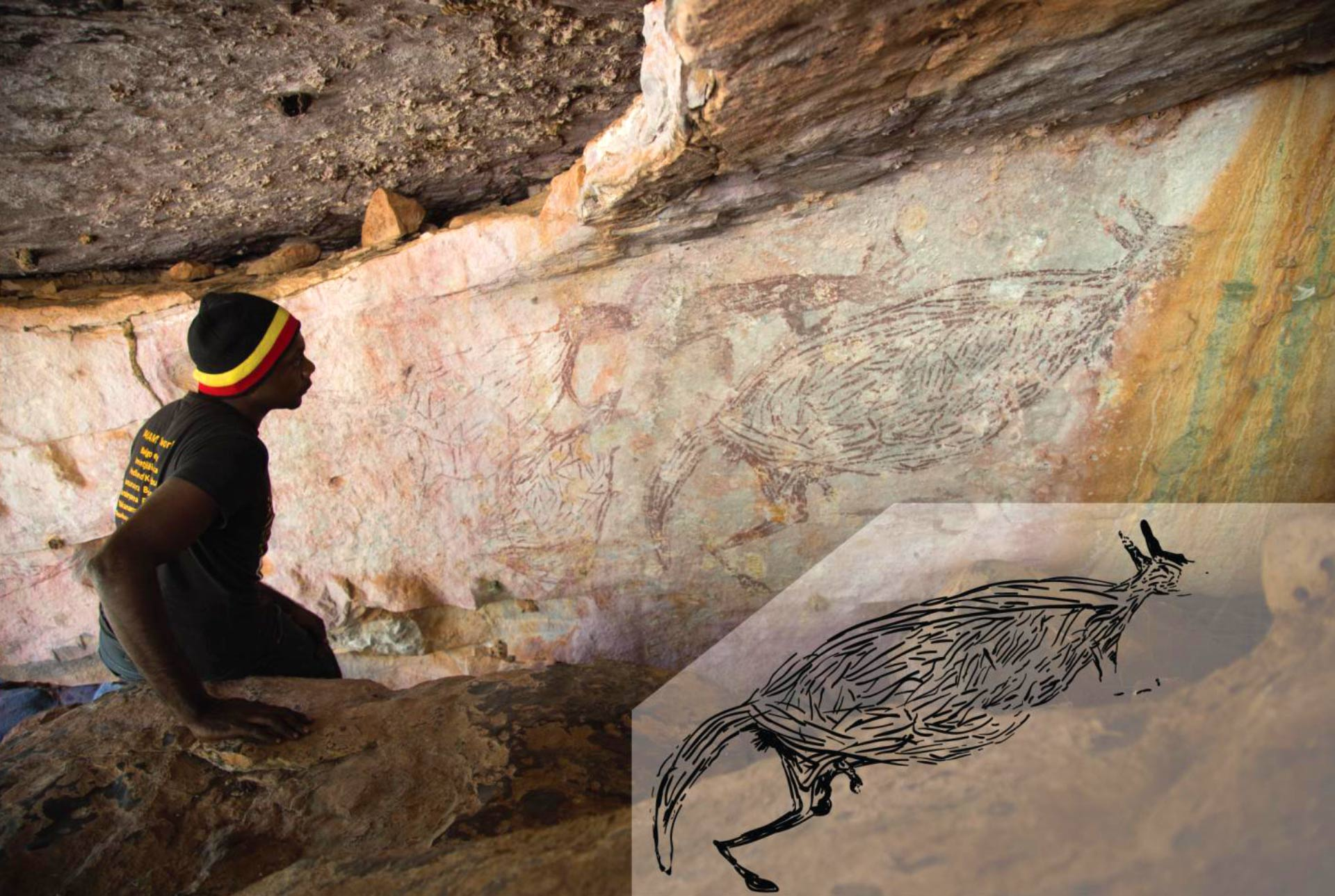
Depiction of kangaroo painting with added drawing for clarity - examined by Traditional Owner Ian Waina on the left.

The changing and expanding complexity of styles and techniques has caught the attention of many, paving the way for mass amounts of archaeological and anthropological research. Much of the artwork in the area has been gone over with similar or alternative methods to preserve the art, add to it, or enhance it. Rock shelters are some of the best locations for preservation. The oldest category known as the Irregular Infill Animal or the Naturalistic period is responsible for the region's life-size animal depictions. A rock shelter in Kimberley's northeastern territory is home to a perfect example of this, a two-meter-long kangaroo painting on the ceiling. This case was extremely rare as archaeologists found remains of mud wasp nests that could be used for dating. These nests were located both below and on top of the painting making them prime for determining an accurate age of the kangaroo art itself. They analysed samples from 6 of the nests and settled on a date between 17,500 years old and 17,100 years old, making the kangaroo rock art the oldest in Australia.

Based on oral accounts from Aboriginal people in the region it has been confirmed that many of the works that have been re-touched maintain a much deeper significance. There is a complex performative aspect that goes hand-in-hand with the art that remains today. The re-touching/re-marking actions are considered a performance and act as a retelling of the story behind the art. The performance is a way for people to reconnect with the cultural significance behind the work itself and maintain the connection from person to place. This process highlights indigenous beliefs about the land and the position that native people have within that space. Identity plays a major role in understanding the rock art in the region. Many different sectors within the Kimberley region allow for a dispersal of cultural thought and expression unique to the group in their respective areas. This differentiation of style may have been socially necessary, but there was a unifying aspect regarding the Wandjinas and the meaning behind them. They are seen throughout the region at many different sites and are the most repainted rock art in Kimberley. This is because indigenous groups believe in the power that Wandjina holds. Creation stories, migrational patterns, and clothing style of the figures emphasise their importance and integration into the sociocultural groups inhabiting the area.

== Geography ==
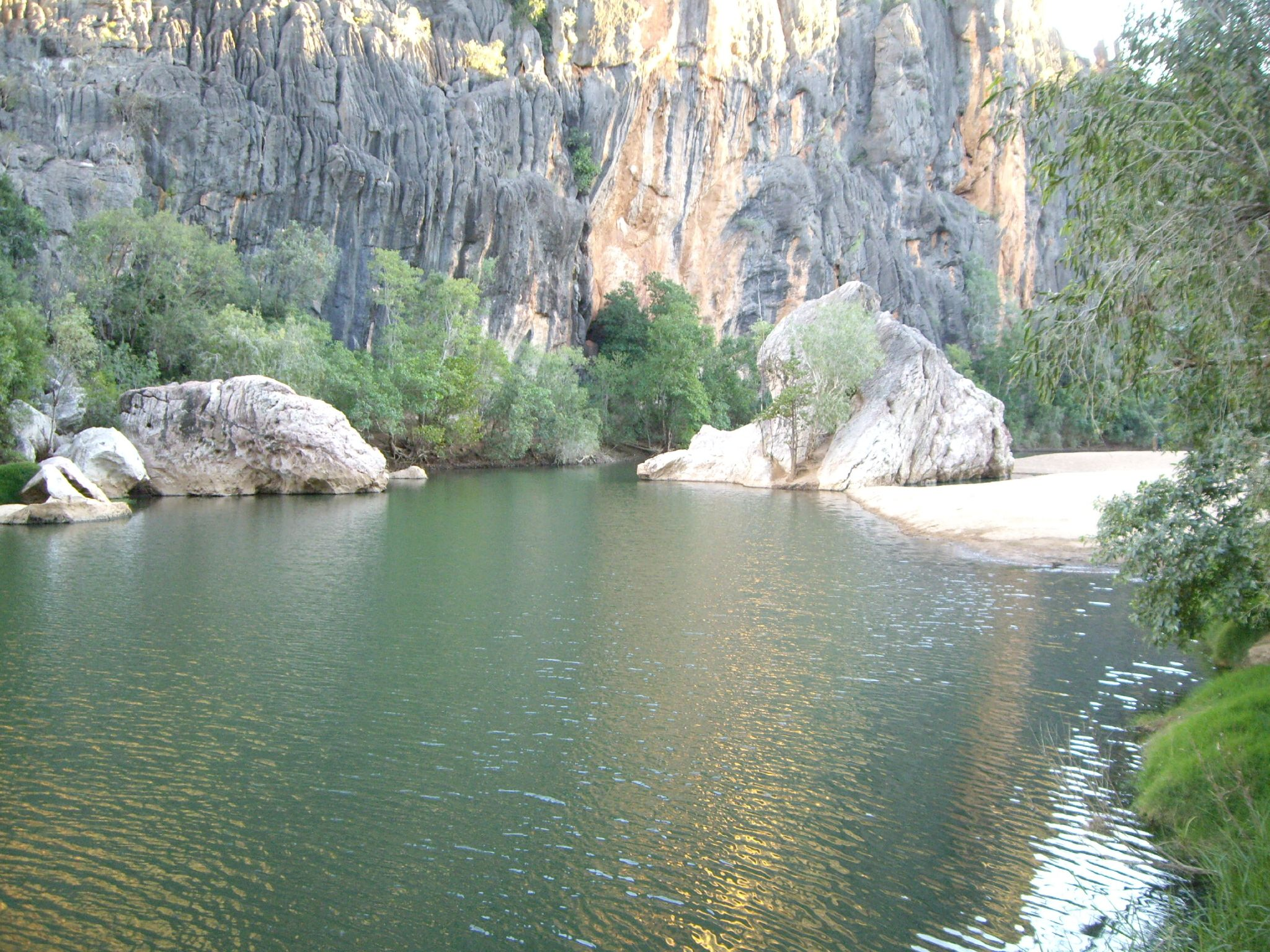
Lennard River

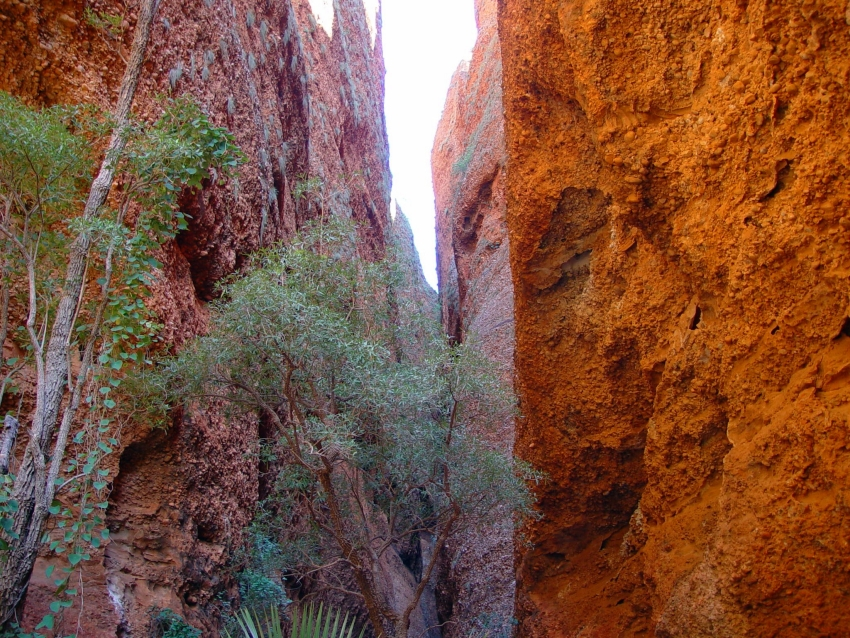
Bungle Bungles - Echidna Chasm

The Kimberley is an area of 423,517 square kilometres (163,521 sq mi), which is about three times the size of England, twice the size of Victoria, or just slightly smaller than California.

The Kimberley consists of the ancient, steep-sided mountain ranges of northwestern Australia cut through with sandstone and limestone gorges and steep ridges, from which the extreme monsoonal climate has removed much of the soil. The southern end of the Kimberley beyond the Dampier Peninsula is flatter with dry tropical grassland and is used for cattle ranching. In parts of the Kimberley, such as the valleys of the Ord and Fitzroy Rivers in the south, the soils are relatively usable cracking clays, whilst elsewhere they are lateritic Orthents. Although none of the mountains reach even 1,000 metres (3,281 ft), there is so much steep land as to make much of the region difficult to traverse, especially during the wet season, when even sealed roads are often flooded. The coast is typically steep cliffs in the north but flatter in the south, all subject to high tides.

The Kimberley coast is subject to Australia's biggest tides which can reach over 11 metres (36 ft). This is due to the presence of the North West Shelf, an unusually massive continental shelf which stretches hundreds of kilometres out towards Indonesia, which amplifies waves as they move across the rising seafloor.

=== Climate ===
The Kimberley has a tropical monsoon climate. The region receives about 90% of its rainfall during the short wet season, from November to April when cyclones are common (especially around Broome) and the rivers flood. The annual rainfall is highest in the northwest, where Kalumburu and the Mitchell Plateau average 1,270 millimetres (50 in) per year, and lowest in the southeast where it is around 520 millimetres (20 in). In the dry season, from May to October, south easterly breezes bring sunny days and cool nights. Climate change since 1967 has led to large increases of as much as 250 millimetres (10 in) per year in annual rainfall over the whole region. A 2007 study suggests that Asian pollution may be a key contributory factor to this increased rainfall. In 1997 and 2000, the region received especially heavy rains, leading to record flooding of the Fitzroy and other rivers.

The Kimberley is one of the hottest parts of Australia, with the average annual mean temperature around 27 °C (81 °F), and with mean maximum temperatures almost always above 30 °C (86 °F), even in July. The hottest part of the year is November before the rains break, when temperatures frequently reach above 37 °C (99 °F) on the coast and well over 40 °C (104 °F) inland. Mean minimum temperatures in July range from around 12 °C (54 °F) in the south to 16 °C (61 °F) along the coast, whilst in November and December they are generally around 26 °C (79 °F). Record high temperatures range from around 47 to 48 °C (117 to 118 °F), while record lows are around 2 to 3 °C (36 to 37 °F), although some parts of the central Kimberly plateau can drop below 0 °C (32 °F) during the dry season.

The Aboriginal people of the Kimberley recognise six traditional seasons based on meteorological events, as well as on observations of flora and fauna.

=== Geology ===
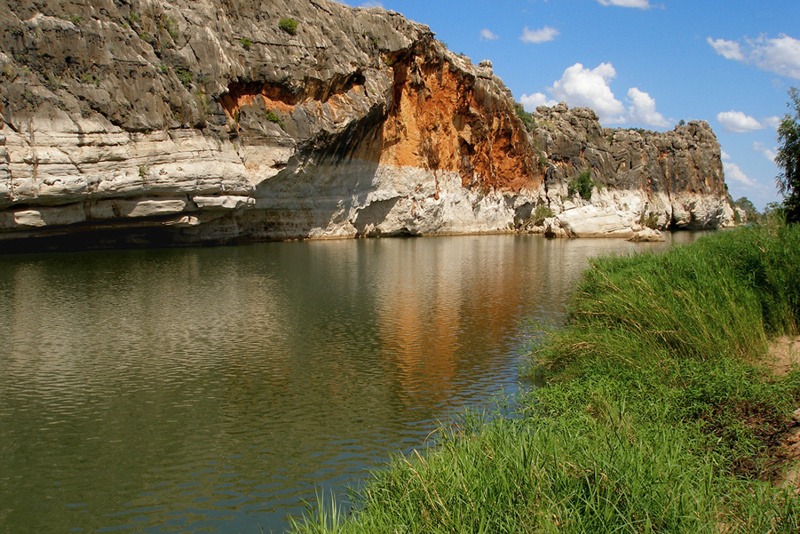
Geikie Gorge National Park, Fitzroy River, 2007

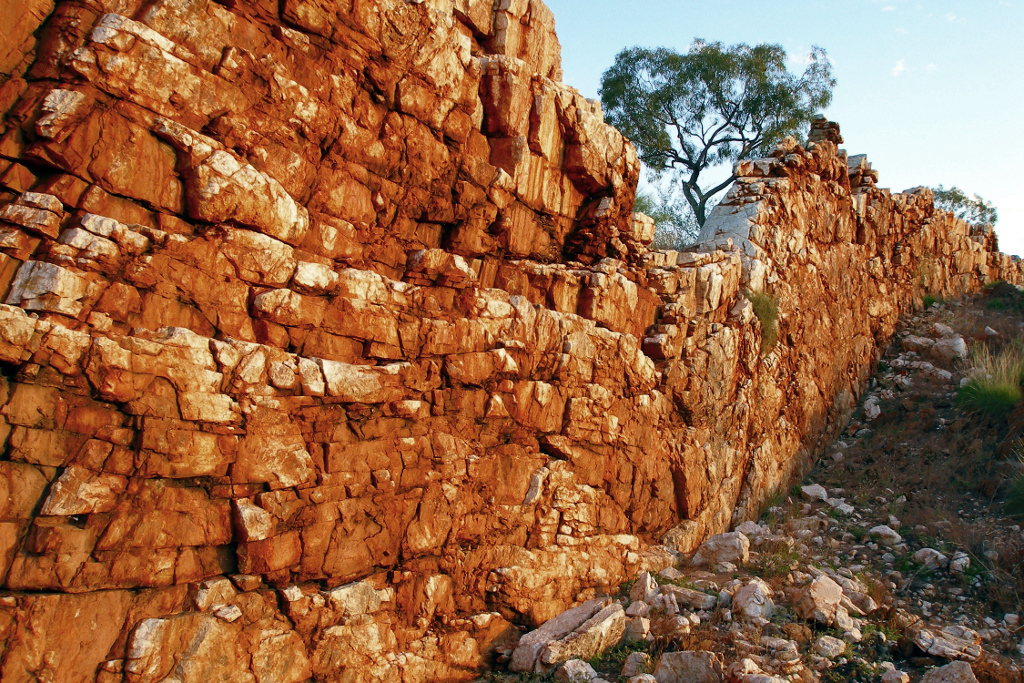
China Wall – a natural rock formation near Halls Creek

During the Devonian period a barrier reef system formed before a subsequent drop in sea levels over the Kimberley. This reef system was similar to the Great Barrier Reef and is still visible today in the form of the Napier Range and the Ningbing Range. Some of the features are Tunnel Creek, Windjana Gorge and Geikie Gorge.

This area is also known as the Kimberley Block physiographic province, which is part of the larger West Australian Shield division. This province contains the Wunaamin-Miliwundi Range, Durack Range, Leveque Rise, Browse Depression, and Londonderry Rise physiographic sections.

=== Coastline ===
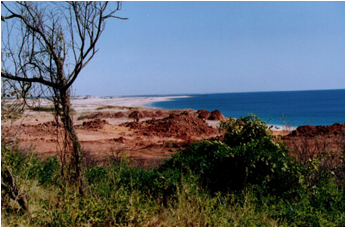
Cape Leveque

According to the Bureau of Meteorology weather reports, the North Kimberley Coast is the Western Australian border to the Kuri Bay section of the coast, while the West Kimberley Coast is from Kuri Bay to Wallal Downs. Significant sections of the coastline between Broome and Wyndham have no means of road access, and boats or helicopters are the only means. Due to the isolation, several tourist operations on the coastline have been termed wilderness locations.

== Ecology ==
The rugged and varied sandstone landscape is home to a distinctive mixture of wildlife, which has been thoroughly mapped and described by the Western Australian Department of Conservation and Land Management.. There are habitats similar to the Kimberley across the border in the Northern Territory, including the valleys of the Victoria and Daly Rivers but these have been less carefully studied.

=== Flora ===
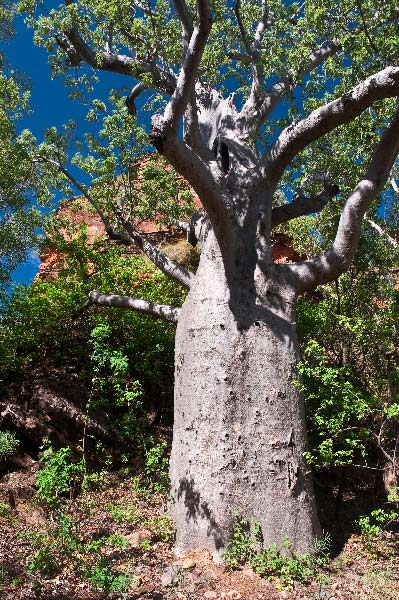
Boab tree near Kununurra

Much of the Kimberley is chiefly covered in open savanna woodland dominated by low bloodwood and boab trees (Adansonia gregorii) with Darwin stringybark and Darwin woollybutt eucalyptus in the wetter areas. The red sandy soil of the Dampier Peninsula in the south is known for its characteristic pindan wooded grassland, while in the more fertile areas like the Ord Valley, the trees are found in grasslands of Chrysopogon, Aristida, Dichanthium and Xerochloa (rice grass) in the wetter valleys. The banks of the Ord, Fitzroy River and other rivers are home to a greater variety of vegetation, while in sheltered gorges of the high rainfall north, there are patches of tropical dry broadleaf forest, called monsoon forests, deciduous vine forest or vine thicket in Australia, (often mistakenly which is called "dry rainforest"), which were unknown to science until 1965, and are one of the most floristically rich parts of Australia outside the Wet Tropics and southwestern Western Australia. There are also areas of mangrove in river estuaries where the coast is flatter.

=== Flora regions ===
In 1979, John Stanley Beard identified four phytogeographic districts within the Northern Botanical Province:

- Gardner District (Ga) in the north (and further divided into the West Gardner (WGa), Central Gardner (CGa) and East Gardner (EGa))
- Fitzgerald District (Fi) in the centre
- Dampier (Da) and Hall (Ha) Districts in the south

=== Fauna ===
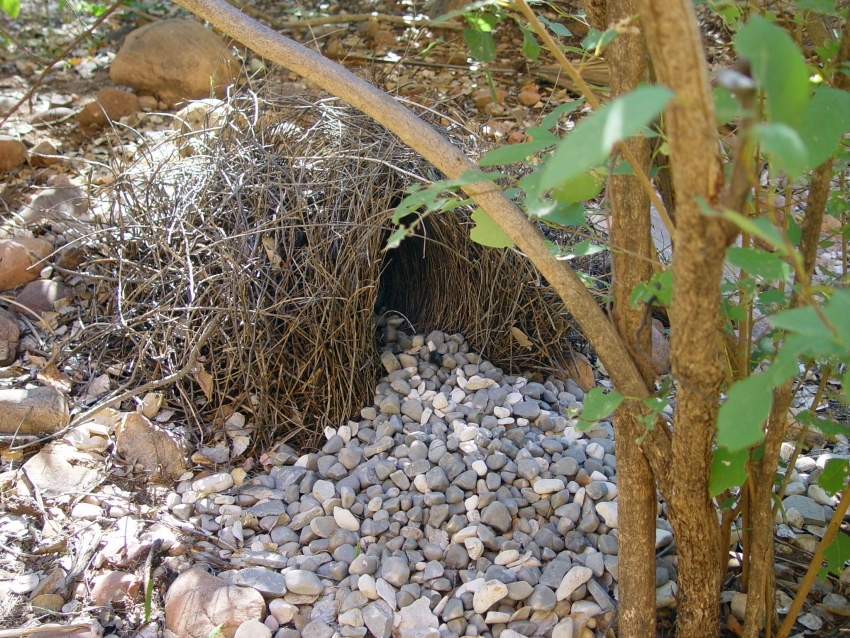
Bowerbird nest

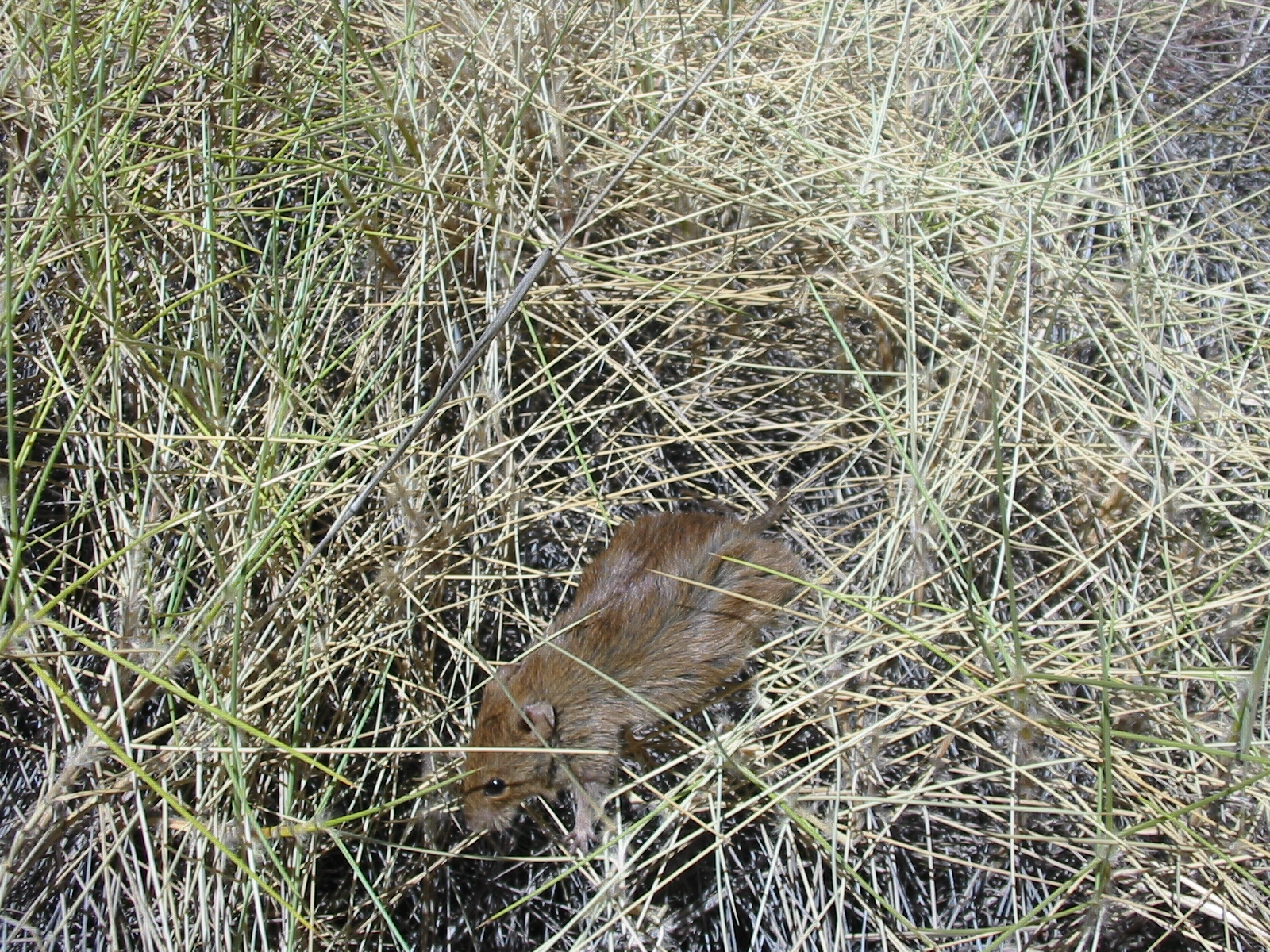
Desert mouse

Animals found here include the huge saltwater crocodile, its smaller cousin the freshwater crocodile and a rich variety of birds such as the channel-billed cuckoo, Pacific koel, purple-crowned fairywren and the bowerbird. The sandstone gorges of north Kimberley are an important refuge for a particularly rich collection of endemic species including some that have disappeared from the flatter areas, including the purple-crowned fairywren, the endangered Gouldian finch and a large number of amphibians: flat-headed frog, cave-dwelling frog, magnificent tree frog, Derby toadlet, small toadlet, fat toadlet, the unconfirmed marbled toadlet, Mjoberg's toadlet, mole toadlet and stonemason's toadlet. Mammals that have declined especially in the flatlands include the bilby, northern quoll, pale field rat, golden-backed tree rat, and golden bandicoot. Megabats such as the black flying foxes and little red flying foxes are common and perform important pollination and seed dispersal work for many species of native trees and shrubs.

A species of endemic gecko, Gehyra kimberleyi, is named after the Kimberley region.

The gorges of central Kimberley are known for their fossils and for their large colonies of bats, including Windjana, Tunnel Creek, and Geikie Gorges. Lake Argyle and other wetlands of the Ord and the Kimberley are important habitats while there are important populations of shorebirds in the Ord estuary, Eighty-mile Beach and Roebuck Bay, which has been described as "one of the most important stop-over areas for shorebirds in Australia and globally". Finally, there are several rocky islands off the north coast that are home to seabirds and turtles.

=== Threats and preservation ===
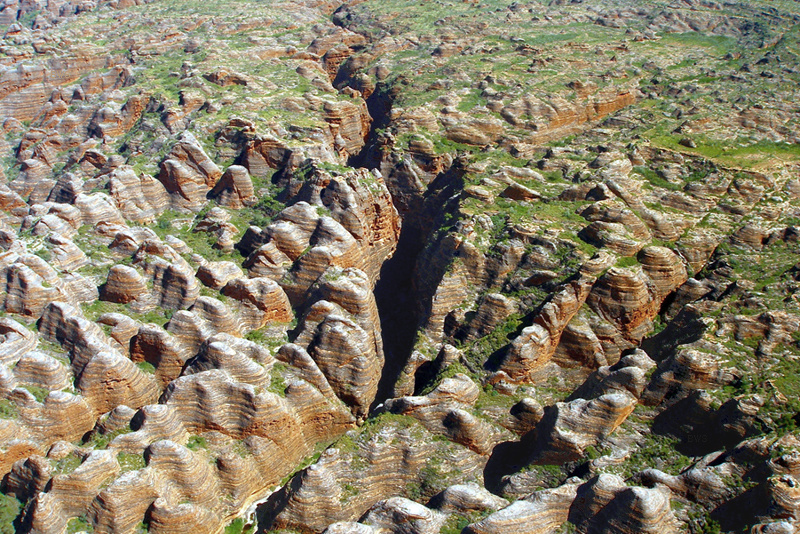
Purnululu National Park

Little of the Kimberley has been subject to wholesale clearance other than particularly fertile parts of the Ord Valley (and areas of Kimberley-type habitat across the Daly River basin in the Northern Territory) but the pastureland in the southern areas has been affected by 100 years of livestock grazing and other threats including introduced weeds (such as cocklebur, parkinsonia, bellyache bush and castor oil plant), feral cats and changes to traditional Aboriginal fire regimes (the way grassland is burnt and allowed to renew). However, the remote sandstone areas to the north have valuable original habitats in good condition providing shelter for much wildlife.

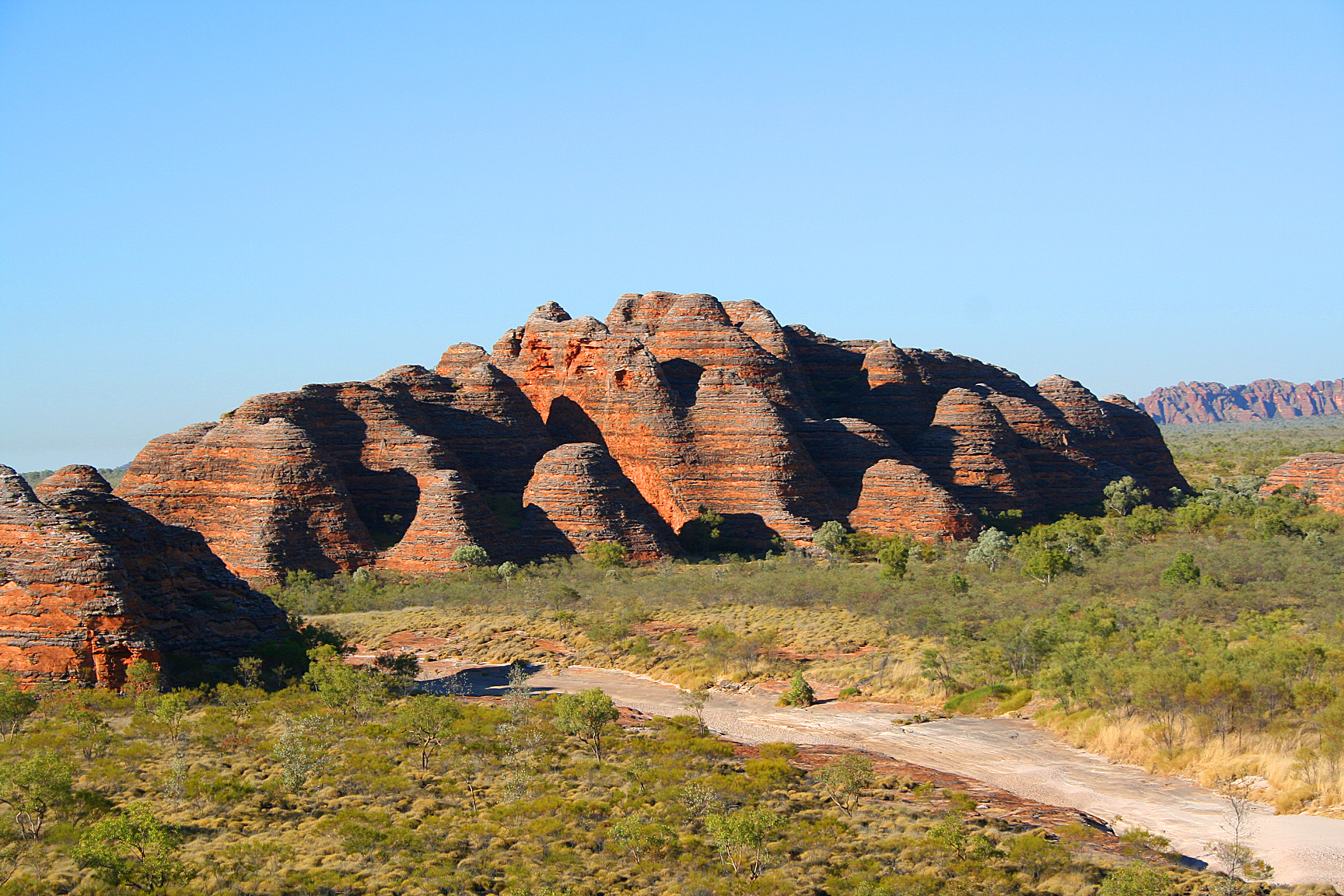
Purnululu National Park – sandstone domes of the Bungle Bungle Range

The largest protected areas are the Prince Regent National Park and the Drysdale River National Park along with Gregory National Park and Keep River National Park across the Northern Territory, which preserves similar habitats. (Keep River's nearest town is Kununurra in the Kimberley.)

The Kimberley is a popular tourist destination, with areas such as the Bungle Bungle Range, the Gibb River Road, Lake Argyle, El Questro Station, Mornington Sanctuary, Horizontal Falls and Cape Leveque. The Gibb River Road and the road into the Bungle Bungles can at times be accessed in a two-wheel drive car, although one can access many additional areas in a four-wheel drive vehicle.

Other parks in the region include Geikie Gorge National Park, Mirima National Park, Mitchell River National Park, Point Coulomb National Park, Purnululu National Park, Tunnel Creek National Park, Windjana Gorge National Park and Wolfe Creek Meteorite Crater National Park. In 2012 the Western Australian government announced the creation of the 7,062-square-kilometre (2,727 sq mi) Camden Sound Marine Park with a further three to come.

Visitors to the area should be aware that the area can be subject to controlled burns at any time of year. In September 2011, a fire burned five people, two severely, who had been competing in the Kimberley Ultramarathon, an endurance cross-country footrace.

=== Save the Kimberley campaign ===
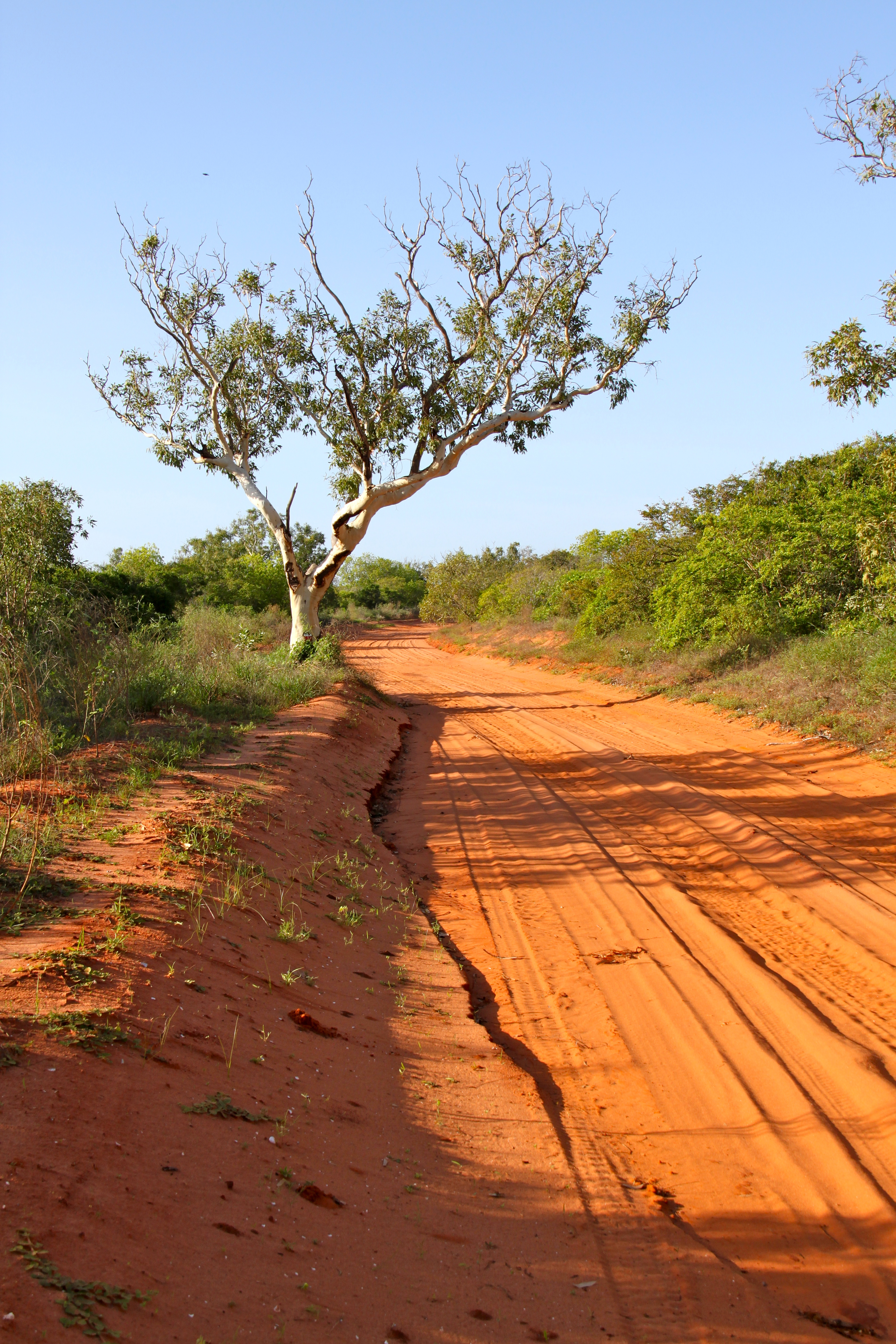
Pindan country near James Price Point

The local Kimberley community led a campaign to stop a proposal to industrialise the Kimberley coast at James Price Point 50 kilometres (31 mi) north of Broome. Woodside Energy, with Joint Venture partners BHP, Chevron, Shell and BP along with the Barnett Liberal-National Coalition Government of Australia, sought to build the largest gas refineries in the world on the Kimberley coast. The local community rejected the proposal given the enormous damage it would've caused.

Organisations and groups that were involved in the campaign included the Goolarabooloo people, the Broome Community No Gas Campaign, Environs Kimberley, Save the Kimberley, The Wilderness Society, Sea Shepherd and Australian Conservation Foundation.

The campaign received support from public figures such as John Butler, Clare Bowditch, Missy Higgins, Jimmy Barnes, Paul Kelly and former leader of the Australian Greens, Bob Brown.

On 5 October 2012, a concert was held at Federation Square in Melbourne, Australia, to raise awareness of the campaign; the protest event attracted approximately 6,000 people.

On 24 February 2013, an estimated 20,000 people gathered for a charity concert in Fremantle, Western Australia to raise awareness and funds to help protect the Kimberley, with performances from Ball Park Music, Missy Higgins, and John Butler.

Woodside and its Joint Venture partners withdrew from the project on 12 April 2013.

== Economy ==
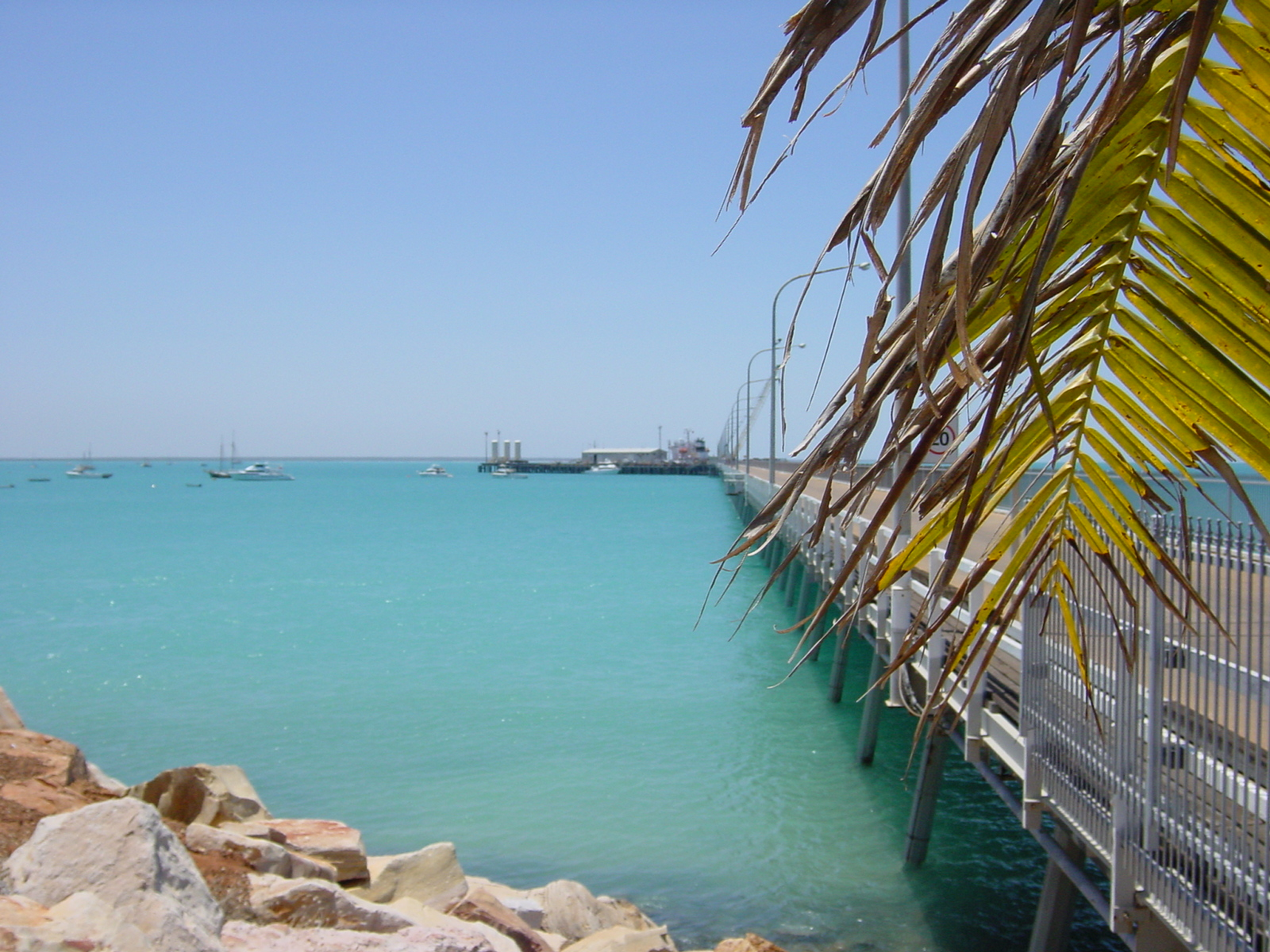
Broome's deep water wharf and jetty

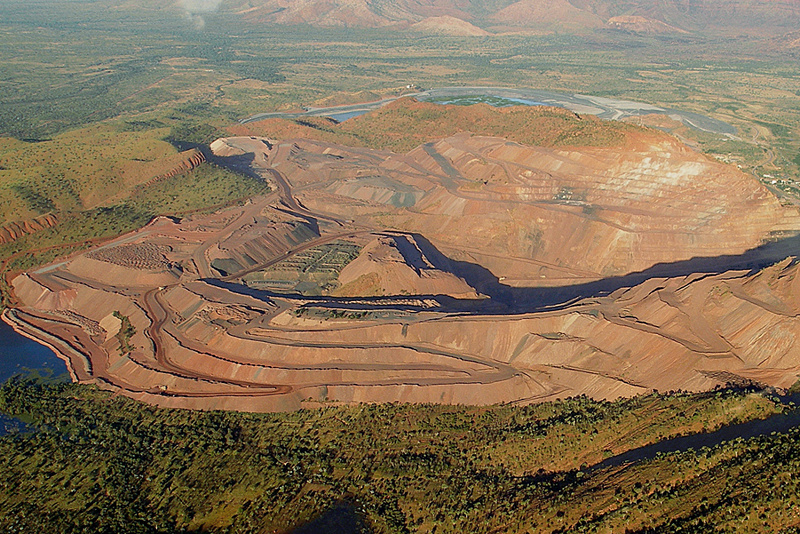
Argyle diamond mine

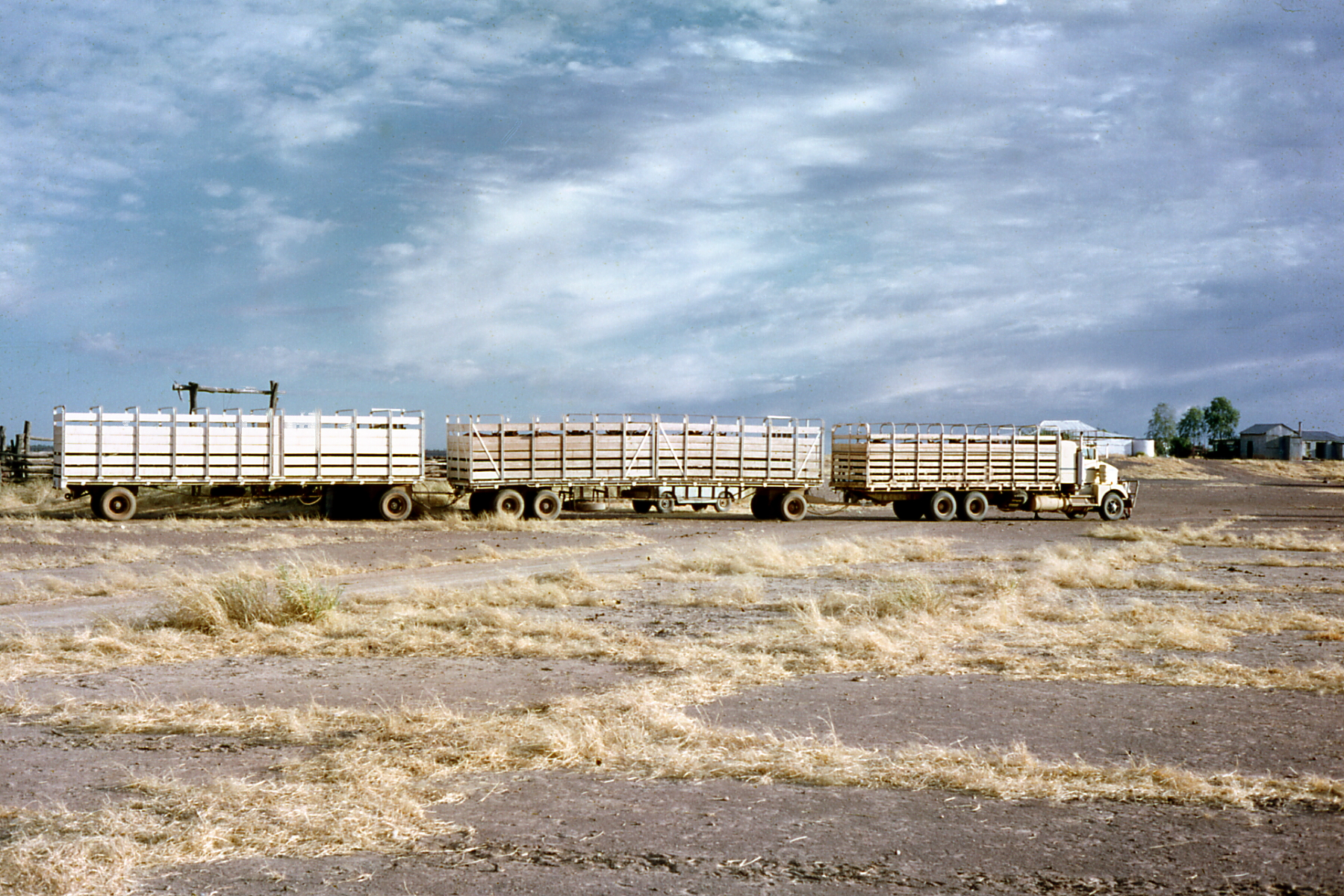
Cattle road trains at Louisa Downs Station

The Kimberley region has a diverse regional economy. Mining, construction, tourism, retail, agriculture, and pearling are major contributors to the region's economic output.

The town of Broome has a flourishing pearling industry, which operates around the Kimberley coast. Some of the major farmers are Paspaley Pearls, Clipper Pearls, Broome Pearls and the Willie Creek Pearl Farm.

One-third of the world's annual production of diamonds used to be mined at the Argyle and the Ellendale diamond mines which are both now closed. Oil was extracted from the Blina oil field in the 1980s and 90s and natural gas is extracted from the Ichthys LNG project. Zinc and lead were mined at the Pillara and Cadjebut mines near Fitzroy Crossing, nickel used to be mined at Savannah Nickel mine near Halls Creek. Derby was the nearest export base for shipping these metals.

Traditionally, the economy depended on pastoral leases, with most of the region covered by the leases.

More recently agriculture has been focused on the Ord River Irrigation Area near Kununurra. Irrigation was also trialled in West Kimberley by way of the now-defunct Camballin Irrigation Scheme which failed in 1983. There are also fruit growers in Broome and other areas in the West Kimberley. Beef cattle are grown in the Kimberley and exported live. There were formerly meatworks at Wyndham, Broome and Derby but financial constraints have caused these to be closed.

Barramundi are bred in Lake Argyle, and Broome features a fully equipped Aquaculture Park near the port; tenants include Paspaley Pearls and Broome TAFE. The Kimberley also has a thriving fishing industry.

Some of Australia's most prominent Indigenous artists and art centres are in or adjacent to the Kimberley region. Artists such as Paddy Bedford and Freddie Timms have an international profile, and there are several Aboriginal-owned and controlled art centres and companies that assist artists, arrange exhibitions and sell works. The art centres in the region are also organized through the Association of Northern, Kimberley and Arnhem Aboriginal Artists. Issues have been raised regarding the exploitation of indigenous artists by businesses and individuals, including in the Kimberley, which was canvassed in an Australian Senate parliamentary committee report.

Tourism is expected to remain one of the Kimberley region's major growth industries. Averaged across 2010, 2011, and 2012, there were 292,600 domestic and international visitors to the Kimberley annually.

Air travel to and from the region is served by Broome International Airport and East Kimberley Regional Airportwhich both provide regular daily flights to Perth and Darwin.

== Tourism ==
The 2003 guidebook "Icons of the Kimberley - An A to Z for Guides and Travellers" noted that "the Kimberley has become a major destination so quickly that the agencies and individuals charged with its care have been unable to keep up."

== See also ==
- List of pastoral leases in Western Australia
- Kimberley-Perth Canal
- Kimberley Plan

== Sources ==
- Frei, Henry P. (1991). Japan's Southward Advance and Australia. From the Sixteenth Century to World War II. Melbourne: Melbourne University Press. ISBN 0-522-84392-1.
- Guého, Russell (2003). Icons of the Kimberley - An A to Z for Guides and Travellers. Kununurra: Northern Habitat. ISBN 0-646-426-12-5.
