= Gooniyandi =

Aboriginal Australian people

The Gooniyandi, also known as the Konejandi, are an Aboriginal Australian people in the Kimberley region of Western Australia.

== Language ==
Gooniyandi, with Bunuba, is one of the two languages of the Bunuban language family.

== Country ==
Gooniyandi traditional land stretched over some 4,600 square miles (12,000 km^{2}) from Fitzroy Crossing in the west to Margaret River Stations 150 miles to the east. Their heartland lay north around the limestone enclaves of the Wunaamin Miliwundi Ranges and around Stony River. Norman Tindale states that their territory encompassed also Bohemia Down, the Ramsay, Sandstone, Mueller, Burramundy, and Geikie Ranges.

According to their tradition, they also had a native purchase on the plains on the northern side of Christmas Creek before the advent of whites, but had lost this area to the Walmadjari.

== Social organization ==
Gooniyandi society is divided into 8 subsections (gooroo), each divided into male and female classes.

- (M) jawalyi A1 = B1 jagadda

(F) nyawajaddi A1= B1 nagadda

- (M) jawangari A2 = B2 jambiyindi

(F) nawangari A2 = B2 nambiyandi

- (M) joowooddoo CI =DI jawandi

(F) nyawooddoo CI =D1 nyawana

- (M) jangala C2 = D2 joonggoodda

(F) nangala C2 = D2 nyanyjili

== Ecology and economy ==
The Gooniyandi comprised numerous inland foraging bands, each harvesting the rich resources of reptiles, crustaceans and fish to be found along their water courses. They had three distinct terms for the types of territory their land covered. Though basically riverine dwellers, shifting around pools, springs and rivers in what they called walibiri lands (river country), they also ventured over pindiri or plains of scrub-land and forested zones to hunt for kangaroos. A third term was ka:waro, denoting the mountainous areas where the euro could be found. Labour was gendered, with men hunting game, which included bustards, echidnas and emus, while the women gathered vegetables, honey and such protein foodstuffs as witchetty grubs and frogs.

The Fitzroy Crossing Gooniyandi were ideally placed to be intermediaries in northwest trade, which they called tjirdi or wirnandi. The crossing was a strategic transit point for trading goods that were passed on over vast distances. They would exchange with southern tribes manufactured goods from the northwest and east like tjimbila, bifaced pressure-flaked stone knives for rites like circumcision and also used for spear blades.

Shellware collected by the Djaui of the Sunday Islands, and bartered with the Warwa and Nyigina in exchange for spears, would in turn be traded by these tribes to the Bunuba and Gooniyandi, who called them tjakuli. These tjakuli trade goods were used in exchanges with the Gija people and the Djaru. Many such objects from the Djaui would eventually end up among the Western Desert tribes.

== History of contact ==
After Alexander Forrest had, in 1879, surveyed Gooniyandi lands, and wrote a glowing account of their potential for development, they began to be selected for pastoral leases in the late 1880s, when pastoralists began to "open up" the Fitzroy River area to establish cattle and sheep stations.

== Alternative names ==
- Gunian, Gunan
- Konean, Konajan, Konejanu (Mangala exonym)
- Kuniandu, Kunian, Kunan, Goonien
- Wadeawulu (Gija exonym)

Source: Tindale 1974, p. 246

== Notable people ==
- Nyibayarri (Jack Bohemia), a Kimberley police tracker, fluent in several languages, who was awarded the British Empire Medal in 1970 after 32 years service
- Mitch Torres actress, director, journalist, playwright, producer, radio presenter, and writer

== Sources ==
- "AIATSIS map of Indigenous Australia". AIATSIS. 14 May 2024.
- Bohemia, Jack; McGregor, William B. (1995). Nyibayarri: Kimberley Tracker. Aboriginal Studies Press. ISBN 978-0-855-75258-3.
- Grossman, Michèle (2013). Entangled Subjects: Indigenous/Australian Cross-Cultures of Talk, Text, and Modernity. Rodopi. ISBN 978-9-401-20913-7.
- McGregor, William B. (1990). A Functional Grammar of Gooniyandi. Studies in Language Companion Series. Vol. 22. John Benjamins Publishing. doi:10.1075/slcs.22. ISBN 978-9-027-23025-6.
- "Tindale Tribal Boundaries" (PDF). Department of Aboriginal Affairs, Western Australia. September 2016. Archived from the original (PDF) on 8 March 2016.
- Tindale, Norman Barnett (1974). "Konejandi (WA)". Aboriginal Tribes of Australia: Their Terrain, Environmental Controls, Distribution, Limits, and Proper Names. Australian National University. ISBN 978-0-708-10741-6. Archived from the original on 20 March 2020.
