= Melanie Hogan =

Australian film director and producer

- Occupation: Documentary filmmaker
- Years active: Since 2004
- Known for: Documentaries about life in remote Aboriginal communities
- Notable work: Kanyini (2006)
- Website: www.melaniehogan.com

Melanie Hogan is a film director and producer of Australian documentaries. Her directorial debut Kanyini premiered at the Sydney Film Festival in 2006.

== Overview ==
Since 2004, Hogan has made documentaries in remote Aboriginal communities, exposing the challenges they face.

Her first documentary, Kanyini (2006), was distributed in Australia by Hopscotch Films. It won the 2006 Discovery Channel Best Documentary Award, the Independent Spirit Inside Film Award, and the Best Documentary Award at the London Australian Film Festival (2007).

Hogan's other documentary films, Yajilarra (2008) and Tristan (2011), both premiered at the United Nations in New York and Government House, Canberra, with Australia's Governor General, Quentin Bryce, as host.

Between 2009 and 2012, Hogan wrote, edited, directed, and produced an online project for the Australian Government called the Stolen Generations Testimonies. The site tells the stories of Aboriginal people who were taken from their families and known as the Stolen Generations.

== Films ==
=== Kanyini ===
Kanyini is her attempt to connect fellow Australians with the story of Australia's past and present from an Anangu perspective, in the hope Australia can move forward in proper friendship with Australia's Indigenous peoples. The film's full title is Kanyini: 40,000 years of culture, one philosophy that connects us all.

Kanyini tells the story of one Aboriginal man from Pitjantjatjara country called Bob Randall and the separation he experienced from his country, his family, his traditional lore and his spirituality since he was a young child.

Kanyini won the Independent Spirit Award as well as the National Geographic Best Documentary Award at the Australian Inside Film Awards the year the film was released.

After Kanyini was released, Hogan went on to develop an education program around Australia called Yarnup, which attempted to connect Australian high-school students with their local Indigenous elders.

=== Yajilarra ===
Still committed to connecting with Indigenous Australians, Hogan then directed her next documentary in the Kimberley in 2008, on the subject of the women of Fitzroy Crossing and their campaign against alcohol abuse in their community. The film's title was devised by the local women themselves: Yajilarra, which means "to dream" in the Bunuba language.

The project came about because the federal sex discrimination officer at the time, Elizabeth Broderick, had heard about what the local women, led by June Oscar AO and Emily Carter, had done to reduce the devastating effects of excessive alcohol consumption in their Fitzroy Valley communities and she wanted their story to be told to the world. She contacted Hogan to direct the film.

=== Tristan ===
In 2011, the women of a community requested that filmmaker Hogan create a new documentary focusing on children affected by fetal alcohol spectrum disorders (FASD), a condition caused by excessive alcohol consumption during pregnancy. The objective of this film was to raise awareness about the risks of prenatal alcohol exposure and to inform the global audience about the necessary support for children with FASD to lead fulfilling lives despite their disabilities. Titled Tristan, the film depicts the challenges faced by a 12-year-old boy living with FASD and underscores the efforts of the Fitzroy Valley community in addressing this condition. The documentary made its debut at the United Nations Headquarters in New York in 2012.

=== Magic ===
In 2019, Hogan appeared in Magic as herself.

== Stolen Generations Testimonies ==
Hogan launched another project in 2011: an online museum devoted to capturing the testimonies of Australia's Stolen Generations. The museum was launched at Parliament House to commemorate the 4th anniversary of the Apology to the Stolen Generations. Hogan has been capturing testimonies since 2009, inspired by Steven Spielberg's Shoah Foundation. By 2012, 46 testimonies had been collected from around Australia.

== Publications ==
- Nyuntu Ninti by Bob Randall and Melanie Hogan, 2011 (ISBN 9780733328503).

This children's book was inspired by the Kanyini documentary.

== Awards ==
Film	Year	Category	Result
Kanyini	2006	Glenfiddich, Independent Spirit Award	Won
Kanyini	2007	London Australia Film Festival, Best Documentary	Won
Kanyini	2009	National Geographic, Best Documentary Film Award	Won
