= Kanyini =

Kanyini is a word in the Pitjantjatjara dialect spoken by Indigenous Australians. It is the principle of connectedness through caring and responsibility that underpins Aboriginal life. Kanyini is a connectedness to tjukurrpa (knowledge of creation or Dreaming), ngura (place, land), walytja (kinship), and kurunpa (spirit or soul). Kanyini is nurtured through caring and practicing responsibility for all things. The concept of Kanyini is associated with the Northern Territory and the Yankunytjatjara people, one of the traditional land owner groups of Uluru.

== See also ==
- Bob Randall (Aboriginal Australian elder)
- Kanyini
- Nurture kinship
