= June Oscar =

Australian Aboriginal indigenous rights activist

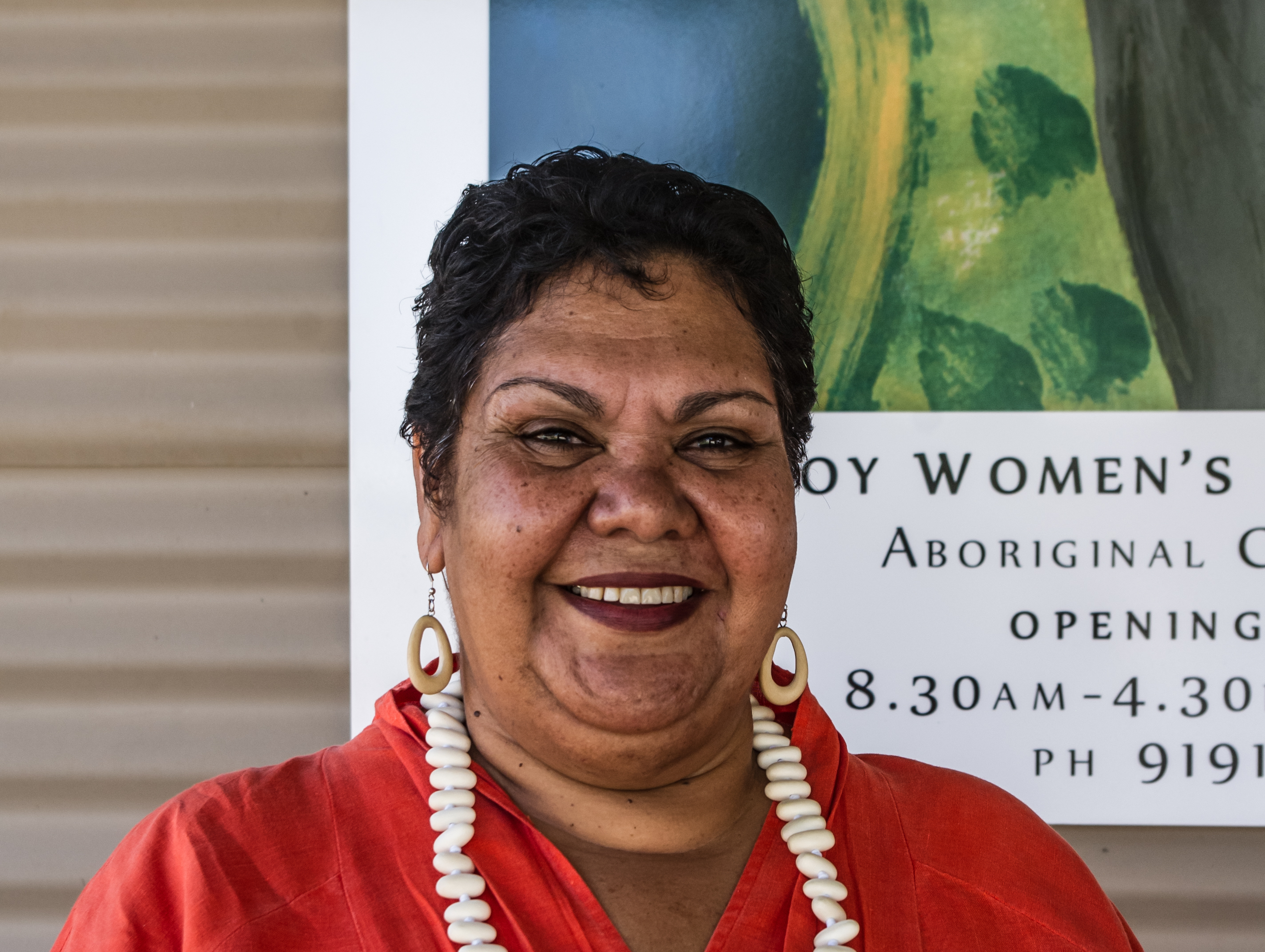
Oscar at the Marninwarntikura Fitzroy Women's Resource Centre

June Oscar is an Australian Aboriginal woman of Bunuba descent, Indigenous rights activist, community health and welfare worker, film and theatre, and since 2017 and as of February 2022 Aboriginal and Torres Strait Islander Social Justice Commissioner.

She is best known for her fight against Fetal Alcohol Spectrum Disorder (FASD) and work in improving the lives of Aboriginal people in remote communities, in particular the Kimberley (Western Australia) town of Fitzroy Crossing. In 2013 Oscar was awarded the Order of Australia for "distinguished service to the Indigenous community of Western Australia, particularly through health and social welfare programs".

In October 2019 she was appointed to the Senior Advisory Group to help co-design the Indigenous voice to government.

== Early life and education ==
Born in Fitzroy Crossing, Western Australia, Oscar was the second of her mother Mona's three girls and three boys. Her biological father was a local white Australian cattle farmer whom she only met once as an adult.

At the age of seven, authorities removed Oscar from the care of her mother and placed her into the United Aborigines Mission in Fitzroy Crossing. Recognised by the missionaries as being a clever child, she was later sent for secondary education at John Forrest Senior High School in Perth, before leaving at the age of 16 to return to Fitzroy Crossing. Oscar didn't think she was capable of studying at tertiary level, but completed a Bachelor of Business degree in 2004 and commenced a PhD research degree in 2011 at University of Notre Dame, Australia.

== Career ==
After returning to Fitzroy Crossing, Oscar worked in state government community welfare and health departments, before becoming the Junjuwa Community Women's Resource Officer in 1989. She then became the Chairperson of the Marra Worra Worra Aboriginal Corporation, one of Australia's oldest and most respected Aboriginal community centres, until 1991, when she was appointed Commissioner of the Aboriginal & Torres Strait Islander Commission for a two-year term. When she was 29 years old, Oscar received a phone call from Aboriginal Affairs Minister Robert Tickner asking her to join the Aboriginal and Torres Strait Islander Commission. She hung up the phone because she thought the call was a hoax but then decided to call him back.

In 1992, Oscar became Chairperson of the Western Australia Aboriginal Women's Advisory Committee, in 1997, deputy director and Executive Member of the Kimberley Land Council, in 2000, Director of Bunuba Films Pty Ltd, and in 2001, Director of the Bunuba Cattle Company. In 2007, she was chosen to be chief executive officer (CEO) of the Marninwarntikura Women's Resource Centre (MWRC).

In 2009, Oscar was appointed Chief Investigator of the Lililwan Prevalence Study on Fetal Alcohol Spectrum Disorder (FASD) and Early Life Trauma. In 2010, she became Chairperson of the Kimberley Language Resource Centre, and was considered a strong advocate for the recognition, rights, preservation and promotion of Australian Aboriginal languages. In the same year, Oscar also became a member of the Western Australian Pastoral Lands Board. In 2013, Oscar was elected Councillor to the Derby / West Kimberley Shire, and in 2015, appointed Board Member of the Kimberley Development Commission.

=== Current positions ===
In February 2017, Attorney-General for Australia George Brandis announced that Oscar was the new Australian Human Rights Commission's Aboriginal and Torres Strait Islander Social Justice Commissioner. Indigenous Affairs Minister Nigel Scullion said, "Ms Oscar's appointment demonstrates the central role Indigenous women play in bringing about social change and I look forward to working closely with her in the future". As of February 2022 she is still in this position.

She joined Quentin Bryce as joint patron of the Indigenous Literacy Foundation in September 2019.

In November 2019, it was announced that Oscar would be one of 20 members of the Senior Advisory Group to help co-design the Indigenous voice to government set up by Ken Wyatt, the Minister for Indigenous Australians. The Group is co-chaired by Wyatt, Marcia Langton and Tom Calma.

As of February 2022 Oscar is co-chair of the Close the Gap campaign, along with Rod Little.

Building on her term as Aboriginal and Torres Strait Islander Social Justice Commissioner, Oscar launched the Wiyi Yani U Thangani Institute For First Nations Gender Justice in 2024 at the Australian National University where she acts as chair. The Institute continues the Wiyi Yani U Thangani project beginning at the Australian Human Rights Commission in 2017 to elevate the voices and rights of First Nations women, girls and gender-diverse peoples.

== Community reconstruction ==
In March 2007 Oscar became CEO of the MWRC in Fitzroy Crossing, that incorporated initiatives such as the Baya Gawiy Children and Family Centre, The Shelter women's refuge, a legal aid unit, a community garden, and a social enterprise. The MWRC was committed to protecting the safety and wellbeing of children, and wanted to stop the violence occurring in their communities as a result of alcohol abuse.

In 2007, the Fitzroy Crossing Hospital was treating around 30 to 40 people per night for alcohol related injuries and the community was in a state of crisis. In the same 12-month period, 55 funerals and 13 suicides were recorded in Fitzroy Valley, a town of approximately 4000 people. In a city the size of Perth, this would have been equal to 500 suicides per month. In response to calls from the community, the State Coroner for Western Australia, Alistair Hope, commissioned a coronial inquest into 22 recent deaths by self-harm in the Kimberley region. The number of deaths by self-harm in Fitzroy Valley were found by the Coroner to be extraordinarily high and there was a "very high correlation between death by self-harm and alcohol and cannabis use".

Oscar then organised the 2007 Annual Women's Bush Meeting, a traditional gathering of Bunuba, Gooniyandi, Walmajarri, Wangkatjunka and Nyikina women. They represented a significant segment of the community and gave their consent to the MWRC beginning a campaign to limit the sale of take-away alcohol in Fitzroy Valley. A community-led intervention to the crisis was formed that proved to be fundamental to its success.

After the Women's Bush Meeting, Oscar wrote to the Director of Liquor Licensing (Western Australia) asking for an initial 12-month suspension of take-away liquor sales in the Valley. The MWRC maintained that alcohol restrictions were required because high numbers of alcohol and drug related suicides were happening in the Valley, people were in a perpetual state of grief and despair and their women's refuge was not able to cope with the number of people seeking protection from domestic violence. Unacceptably high numbers of medical outpatients were suffering from alcohol abuse, and at the local hospital 85% of trauma patients were affected by alcohol and 56% of all patients were under the influence of alcohol when they were admitted. It was even becoming normal for children to drink alcohol. Crime rates included a disproportionately high number of alcohol related incidents, local employers had difficulty retaining staff, school attendance was reduced, and a substantial number of children under the age of five had FASD-related symptoms.

During this period, the MWRC networked with community cultural leaders through the Kimberley Aboriginal Law and Cultural Centre (KALACC), an Aboriginal organisation that supports the traditional practices of the 30 language groups in the Kimberley. Oscar revealed the significance of their support in the alcohol restriction campaign:

It was really important to let elders know what was happening. We liaised with cultural leaders and elders through KALACC. KALACC helped facilitate approval from elders for the alcohol restrictions. The role of KALACC was critical; it would have been very interesting had they not supported the campaign. The support of KALACC managed some of the forces in the community.

Oscar's move to get the backing of elders and cultural leaders was a major factor in persuading the Director of Liquor Licensing to impose the alcohol restrictions. Certain sectors of the community were against the restrictions and the support from elders gave the MWRC campaign the legitimacy it needed. In the face of fierce opposition from some members of her community who had a vested interest in the sale of alcohol, Oscar stood firm. She knew the restrictions would give her people much needed relief from the trauma and chaos caused by alcohol abuse.

Western Australia Police supported the fight against take-away liquor and a strategic partnership was formed. The campaign was strengthened by this partnership, though it did not affect how it was managed. Western Australian Police Commissioner Karl O'Callaghan said: "When I first went up to Fitzroy Crossing, looking down from the air I saw what looked like green emeralds on the ground", "They turned out to be thousands and thousands of cans of VB beer, where people had sat around drunk." Fitzroy Crossing Police were spending much of their time on alcohol-related crime. When Oscar received threats and slander while running the campaign, commissioner O’Callaghan gave her his personal phone number and said "ring me anytime".

In September 2007, the Director of Liquor Licensing announced take-away liquor sales were a major cause of alcohol-related harm in Fitzroy Crossing. The Director considered the harm serious enough to enforce a six-month trial in which the sale of take-away alcohol was restricted. Under the restrictions, only low-strength beer could be sold at the take-away liquor store in Fitzroy Crossing. Full-strength beer, wine and spirits were only available for consumption during opening hours within licensed premises.

A review meeting was held in May 2008, approximately eight months after the restrictions began, which was attended by the Director of Liquor Licensing and members of the Aboriginal community. Oscar said the meeting was 'the most important minutes of our lives'. The views of people who attended were that women now felt more empowered, confident and able to participate in community-level discussions, the Valley was a much more quiet and safe place to live, and other Aboriginal communities had noticed the positive example set in the Valley. Alcohol restrictions had encouraged government and non-government agencies to become more involved, a strong desire to not return to the chaos of pre-restriction times prevailed, and change needed to be substantial and long lasting. The people felt priority needed to be given to children's health and welfare, and they wanted the next generation of children to be raised without alcohol affecting their lives, families were stronger and sober, old people were being cared for, young people were thinking about buying homes, and children were learning new skills. They also believed sly grogging had become an issue, communities with people suffering from FASD needed help, and if the restrictions were lifted, all of the confidence that now existed in the community would be 'stripped away'.

After the meeting, the Director of Liquor Licensing ruled that restrictions on take-away alcohol in Fitzroy Crossing would exist indefinitely. Oscar and the MWRC had secured the first community-led limit on the sale of alcohol to an entire town. Four of the Aboriginal communities in Fitzroy Valley, Wangkatjungka, Noonkanbah, Yakanarra and Bayulu, embraced alcohol restrictions after the Director's decision was implemented. The nearby town of Halls Creek also later adopted the restrictions.

In July 2009, the University of Notre Dame released the findings of its review on the first 12 months of restrictions. Their report, Fitzroy Valley Alcohol Restriction Report: An evaluation of the effects of a restriction on take-away alcohol relating to measurable health and social outcomes, community perceptions and behaviours after a 12-month period, suggested that nearly all people surveyed on the impact of restrictions believed some type of limit on alcohol consumption was required, and none of them wanted their community to go back to what it was like before restrictions were introduced.

Notre Dame found that the communities gained many health and social benefits from the restrictions, including: a reduction in the severity of domestic violence; a lower tolerance of domestic violence – domestic violence reporting increased by 23% and alcohol related domestic violence reporting increased by 20%; a reduction in the severity of injuries caused by general public violence; a 36% reduction in alcohol related patients at the hospital emergency department during its busiest period, October to March, and a 42% reduction in other periods; a reduction in drinking alcohol in the streets; the Valley became a quieter and cleaner town; increased awareness in family and children's health; a reduction in humbug and anti-social behaviour; reduced pressure on service providers led to an increase in the effectiveness of assistance they provided; an increase in the level of care for children and their recreational activities; a 91% reduction in take-away purchases of pure alcohol; an overall reduction in alcohol consumption by residents of the Valley.

The Notre Dame review also noted that benefits from the restrictions were not enough to address the deep-rooted issues associated with alcohol abuse, and communities in the Valley needed continuing support. In her speech at the Western Australian Equal Opportunity Commission Forum, Perth, 10 August 2009, Oscar stated that Aboriginal leaders in the Valley had taken their first steps on the path of reconstructing their communities but now needed the government to support them:

It is a story of colonisation; the threat of losing our cultural authority to manage our societies; and the despair that has come from that disempowerment.

It is a story of grief and trauma and the continued pain of living with grog, drug and violence.

It is a story that academics and journalists write about us as though we are victims of history that we can do nothing about. And within their stories about us is an acceptance that the paternal hand of government will determine the nature of our welfare and even the nature of our rights.

… I want to tell a different story. It is about how Aboriginal people can be the authors of our stories and not passive and powerless subjects in stories told and written by others.

… I want to talk about how the leaders of the Fitzroy Valley in the Kimberley are working together to create a pathway of hope and community vitality and resilience… if our journey of social reconstruction could be measured as a one kilometre track, we have only travelled the first metre.

The start of the journey has depended on the leadership of the Aboriginal community but the journey from this point on will largely be shaped by a partnership that we can create and build with governments.

== Fighting Fetal Alcohol Spectrum Disorder (FASD) ==
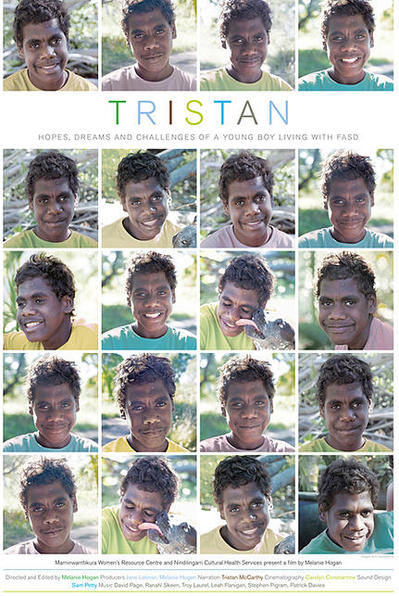
Tristan (2011) was a follow up to the film Yajilarra and portrayed the struggle of a 12-year-old Aboriginal boy who suffered from severe FASD.

Fetal Alcohol Spectrum Disorder (FASD) is known to impair memory, and the ability to learn and retain information. FASD is also considered a serious threat to preserving Aboriginal cultural traditions in the Valley, which are passed down by elders and not recorded in writing. Aboriginal cultural knowledge is taught to new generations through song, dance and storytelling, and Oscar was concerned. "These kids may have speech delays and difficulty remembering. But memory is critical to our whole heritage because Aboriginal culture and language is passed down orally. Language is the essence of who we are; it identifies us and the world we come from".

Around a year after alcohol restrictions in the Valley came into place, in October 2008, a community meeting led by the MWRC and Nindilingarri Cultural Health Services gathered to talk about FASD and other problems related to alcohol. People who attended the meeting were concerned about the high number of children and families suffering from the symptoms of FASD and Early Life Trauma (ELT). ELT is a term that defines issues that have a negative influence on a child's development, such as poor nutrition, neglect, stress and violence. In November 2008, Oscar jointly developed a draft strategy to fight these issues titled Overcoming Fetal Alcohol Spectrum Disorders (FASD) and Early Life Trauma (ELT) in the Fitzroy Valley: a community initiative.

This strategy was called the Marulu Project, named using a word in the [Bunuba language that means "precious, worth nurturing". The Marulu Project focused on: FASD and ELT prevention, including creating awareness in communities that the project existed and educating pregnant women to prevent alcohol abuse; FASD diagnosis, including the development of diagnostic systems; FASD support, including the establishment of a map of support services available in the valley and a network of carers; conversation at a high level on FASD, including strategic communication through media channels, discussion with the scientific community, and increasing awareness through strategic partnerships; strengthening the project's capacity to fight FASD through participating in workshops and attending conferences; identifying existing resources and securing new resources, including approaching the government and organisations for funding; and engaging resources in the local community in FASD prevention, diagnosis and support.

In 2009, Oscar and other leaders of the Marulu Project approached the George Institute for Global Health (The George) regarding the possibility of conducting a study on the prevalence of FASD in Fitzroy Valley. The George had previously developed Yajilarra (2009), a documentary film on Oscar's group of Aboriginal women's campaign to limit alcohol consumption in Fitzroy Valley, and was considered a suitable organisation to provide medical research services to the project. The purpose of the study was to discover how many children were affected by FASD, attract funding and resources to provide care for the children affected, and prevent the disorder from occurring.

The prevalence study was called the Lililwan Project and Oscar was appointed its Chief Investigating Officer. It focused on children aged between seven and eight years in the Valley and was named using a word in the Kriol language that means 'all the little ones'. Through consulting with Aboriginal communities and service providers before proceeding with the study, Lililwan Project set an example for all of Australia to see on how to successfully manage Indigenous affairs. The consultation process was fundamental to getting people's consent to conduct the research. Local women were trained as researchers, were involved throughout the study, and worked as 'community navigators' who persuaded people to participate. The Lililwan Project achieved an extraordinary participation rate of 95% and had a guiding a set of principles and preconditions:

Principles

1. First, to do no harm.
2. Commitment existed to a process of two-way learning.
3. All activity had to provide short- and long-term benefits for communities.
4. Informed involvement and consent needed to be ensured in the sharing of information and knowledge.
5. All activity needed to preserve the dignity of participating individuals and communities.

Preconditions

1. Clear and broad informed consent from communities and local service providers existed.
2. Local control – the project leadership team needed to be, and needed to be perceived by communities as being, in control of the study.
3. An appropriate and adequate workforce existed to conduct the study.

The Lililwan Project had two distinct stages. Stage 1 commenced in April 2010, and involved collecting demographic, prenatal and early childhood data and reviewing children's medical records. Parents and carers were interviewed, and questions were included on the alcohol consumption habits of mothers during pregnancy and the development of children. Stage 2 commenced in May 2011, and involved conducting child health and development tests, and making opportunistic medical treatments and referrals. This stage included examinations by doctors and other health professionals of all children in the study born in 2003 and 2003 to determine the prevalence of FASD. A health plan was developed for every child diagnosed with the disorder to ensure they received suitable ongoing care.

Stage 1 of the project was funded by an Australian philanthropist and was completed in August 2010. In July 2010, the Australian Minister for Indigenous Affairs and the Minister for Indigenous Health jointly announced that the Australian Government would fund stage 2 with a AUD $1million research grant. The grant was expected to cover approximately half the project cost. In a 2010 report, paediatricians estimated that up to 30% of children in Fitzroy Valley were affected by FASD. The Lililwan Project is still active today.

== Films and plays for social change ==
Jandamarra The Play (2008) was sold out before its opening season premiere at the Perth International Arts Festival. As the director of Bunuba Films since 2000, Oscar was one of the driving forces in the company's marathon journey to bring Jandamarra's story to the stage. Jandamarra, a Bunuba warrior born in 1873, was famous for leading his people in an armed uprising against the British colonisation of their lands. He outsmarted the police and settlers in the Kimberley for years, before being killed in 1897 at the age of 24. Geoffrey Bolton, a distinguished Australian historian, compared Jandamarra to guerrilla leaders such as the Mexican revolutionary Emiliano Zapata and Sicilian rebel Salvatore Giuliano. Oscar said Jandamarra was fighting for his people's freedom. "He was not an outlaw, he was fighting for his land, I think he was a freedom fighter."

Yajilarra (2008) by Australian director Melanie Hogan, was a powerful documentary film based on Oscar's and the MWRC's campaign to restrict alcohol consumption in Fitzroy Valley. In 2007, Oscar and Emily Carter from the MWRC invited the Sex Discrimination Commissioner (Australian Human Rights Commission), Elizabeth Broderick, to visit Fitzroy Crossing and help them to make a film that would create social change. To get ongoing help for their community they knew they had to tell the world about the crisis it was in. Commissioner Broderick introduced Oscar and Carter to The George, who helped secure funding to produce the film. Yajilarra was shown at an event hosted by Commissioner Broderick and the Hon. Tanya Plibersek MP, Australian Minister for the Status of Women, at the 53rd Session of the UN Commission on the Status of Women (CSW) in New York, from 2 to 13 March 2009. That was the first time Australian Aboriginal women were presented at CSW.

Tristan (2011) by Hogan was a follow-up film to Yajilarra and was commissioned by Oscar and the Lililwan Project, The George and the University of Sydney Discipline of Paediatrics and Child Health. The documentary was part of the campaign to support children affected by FASD. When Tristan was released, the Australian government had yet to recognise FASD as a disability. Tristan highlighted the danger in drinking alcohol in pregnancy by portraying the struggle of a 12-year-old Aboriginal boy who suffered from severe FASD. The boy lived in Fitzroy Crossing loved Australian rules football and was much like other boys his age. Hogan's film told how Tristan struggled more than the other children in his family who were less affected by FASD, needed to have regular breaks when focusing on a task, and often needed to have instructions repeated to him. His uncle was worried the police and other authorities could easily misunderstand his inability to communicate, or comprehend the consequences of his actions. But Tristan wanted to become a policeman one day and just wanted to be 'normal'. Tristan was shown at the 11th session of the United Nations Permanent Forum on Indigenous Issues in New York, from 7 to 18 May 2012. The film concluded with a message from Oscar: "The attitude of society towards FASD must change, since the children with the condition can’t".

== Awards and honours ==
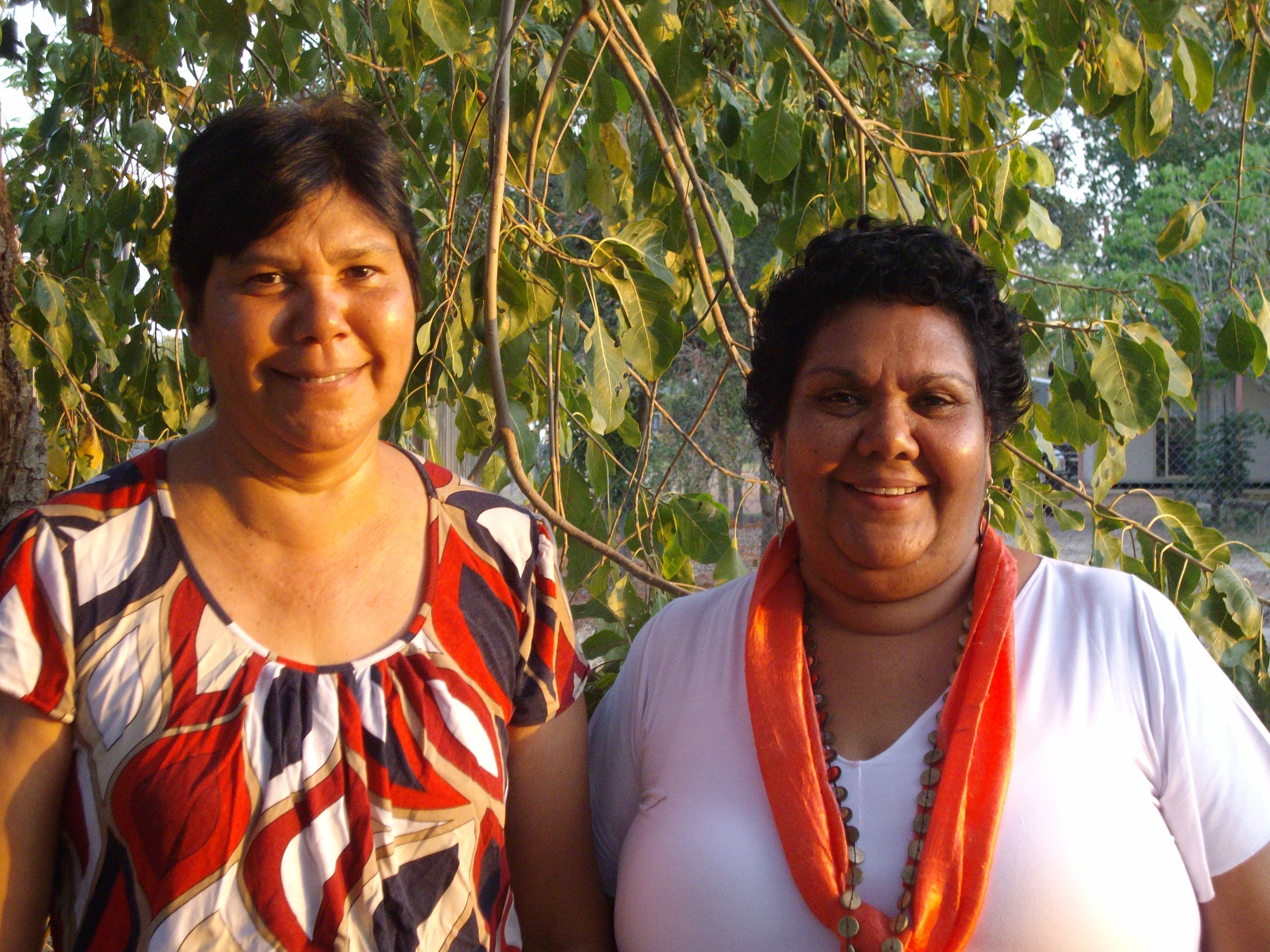
June Oscar and Emily Carter, 2010 Australian of the Year Award State Finalist

- National NAIDOC Person of the Year 2018
- WA Australian of the Year Award, Local Hero (2017)
- Honorary doctorate from Edith Cowan University (2017)
- Desmond Tutu Reconciliation Fellowship, Global Reconciliation (2016)
- Menzies School of Health Research Medallion (2014)
- Winner of the Westpac and Australian Financial Review 100 Women of Influence, Social Enterprise and Not for Profit category (2013)
- Officer for the Order of Australia (2013)
- Ambassador for Children and Young People in Western Australia (2012)
- One of the fifty most influential women in the world in The Age Good Weekend magazine and Sydney Morning Herald Weekend magazine (2011)
- One of the hundred most significant women in Western Australia on International Woman's Day (2011)
- Australian of the Year Award State Finalist, Local Hero (2010)

== Publications ==
- The Lililwan Collaboration: Inquiry into Fetal Alcohol Spectrum Disorders (FASD)
- 'Making FASD History' Fetal Alcohol Spectrum Disorder Prevention Strategy Report 2014-2015
- Making FASD History: 2015 Annual Report to Western Australian Government Department of Aboriginal Affairs: Marulu Fetal Alcohol Spectrum Disorders Prevention Strategy
