= Australian Legislative Ethics Commission =

The Australian Legislative Ethics Commission, also referred to as ALECOMM, is a non-governmental organization established in 1998. Its primary objective is to promote ethical conduct within Australia's Family Law system through investigations and public transparency campaigns. The organization assists families who have experienced child removal by child protection agencies when caseworkers have not followed legal protocols, guidelines, and policy. ALECOMM recently registered as an Australian Charity to support its mission.

== Work with Indigenous organisations ==
In recent years, the commission has been involved in collaborative work with various indigenous organisations in order to address grievances surrounding the increasing number of indigenous children being removed from families and placed in out-of-home care. This renewed awareness of Indigenous concerns comes after former Prime Minister Kevin Rudd (2007-2010, June 2013-September 2013) publicly apologised for the former so-called stolen generations, and has announced government intentions to actively participate in programs designed to improve the Family Law System and Children's Safety.

The recently assembled federal Senate Inquiry into Children in Out of Home Care brought forward with the assistance of MP David Shoebridge and other members of parliament has provided the Australian public a new opportunity for awareness as it pertains to inner workings and flaws of the state-run child protection protection services and has increased transparency around such issues. In particular, Senator Rachel Siewert has chaired the Inquiry's committee, which was due to report on out-of-home care in May 2015.

== NGO activism with the Australian government ==
In the past five years, the commission has investigated dozens of matters whereby child protection agents seek to intimidate and censor by forcing a lawsuit against parents complaining against their unlawful actions. Such actions generally leave the parents without legal defence and/or contact with their children until they abandon public voicing of their grievances. ALECOMM, Australia's Legislative Ethics Commission, is now pushing to introduce anti-SLAPP (Strategic lawsuit against public participation) at the national level in order to ensure that agents of the State involved in care and protection matters are not denied justice because of the departments unlimited war-chest and magistrates inabilities to ensure that policy and procedure are followed at all times, preventing such unlawful actions against our sentient beings.

The charity has multiple interests in human rights and actively promotes the Convention on the Rights of the Child, the International Covenant of Civil and Political Rights, and Universal Declaration of Human Rights through development of two systems linked direct to Geneva. People can report human rights violations direct to the UN, and also report enforced disappearances.

Over the past decade, the commission has participated in many national rallies and attempts to bring to the forefront the high suicide rate of mothers who have had their children removed without lawful justification. Grandmothers who are then having to bury their own children are forced to fight the system that has taken their grandchildren in order to secure the type of burial they wish for their kin, as the department often claim they are the dead mothers next of kin and so choose how the deceased will be buried.
