= Hidden Generations =

Hidden Generations is a term used to describe a group of Indigenous peoples who responded to colonial forces in Australia by reducing their visibility. Although the term is relatively new in public conversation, it describes a very established pattern of behaviour. The emergence of the term is an outcome of this group of Indigenous people once again asserting their cultural identity.

Hiding was seen by many Indigenous peoples as the best of the poor options available to ensure safety for their families and continuity of their lineages. Events that prompted these strategies included child removals (resulting in the Stolen Generations), restrictions of movements on missions and reserves, dispossession of land, massacres, and the introduction of foreign disease. Hidden Generation people hid in a number of ways – at times they hid physically, at other times they hid their identity and cultural practices.

Aboriginal peoples often experienced discrimination as a result of government policies, such as assimilation, which led to Indigenous people being regarded as inferior to non-Indigenous people. In this context, some families determined that, for the safety of their children, it was best to hide their children's identities. These children grew up unaware of their Indigenous heritage. Some families relocated from their traditional lands to places where they were unknown. Some hid in plain sight from colonial society by claiming to be of another heritage, one that was less discriminated against by colonial Australia.

These strategies meant that families avoided becoming Stolen Generations, or being removed from Country to reserves or missions. Families were kept together, often on Country or in the bush. As a result, they were able to continue to share cultural knowledge and family stories, and to maintain traditional familial structures and cultural practices, albeit in a less visible way. The disadvantages of this strategy included disconnection from wider kin networks.

== Overview ==
Hiding is a strategy that began in the early days of colonisation. In the book Hidden in Plain View Paul Irish describes how Aboriginal people were ignored in colonial narratives, despite being prominent in early colonial Sydney, and re-emerged a century later when government intervention was on the increase.

Sally Morgan (Palku and Nyamal) discusses hiding identity due to shame in her book My Place. Harassment from Fisheries and the general public deterred South Coast Aboriginal people from fishing, causing shame and anger as their culture became criminalised as something to hide and practice in secret. Eileen Alberts (Gunditjmara) describes how her aunt, Connie Hart, used to watch in secret as her mother wove, thereby keeping their weaving practice alive. In the play Winyanboga Yurringa, Andrea James (Yorta Yorta/Kurnai) describes how women wove in the dark to keep the practice alive.

Elder Frances Bodkin (Bidigal/D'harawal) calls the Hidden Generations the Dudbaya'ora – the Hidden Ones. Her son, Gawaian Bodkin-Andrews (Bidigal/D'harawal), says, "the Hidden Generations are those whose Bloodlines sit in the often-ignored ether between the missions and the Stolen Generations."

== Nowadays ==
Many Indigenous people are now speaking and publishing about their family stories and experiences. The term Hidden Generation is becoming increasingly widespread as the experiences of these groups become acknowledged and recognised.
