= Stolen Generations =

Indigenous Australian children forcibly acculturated into White Australian society

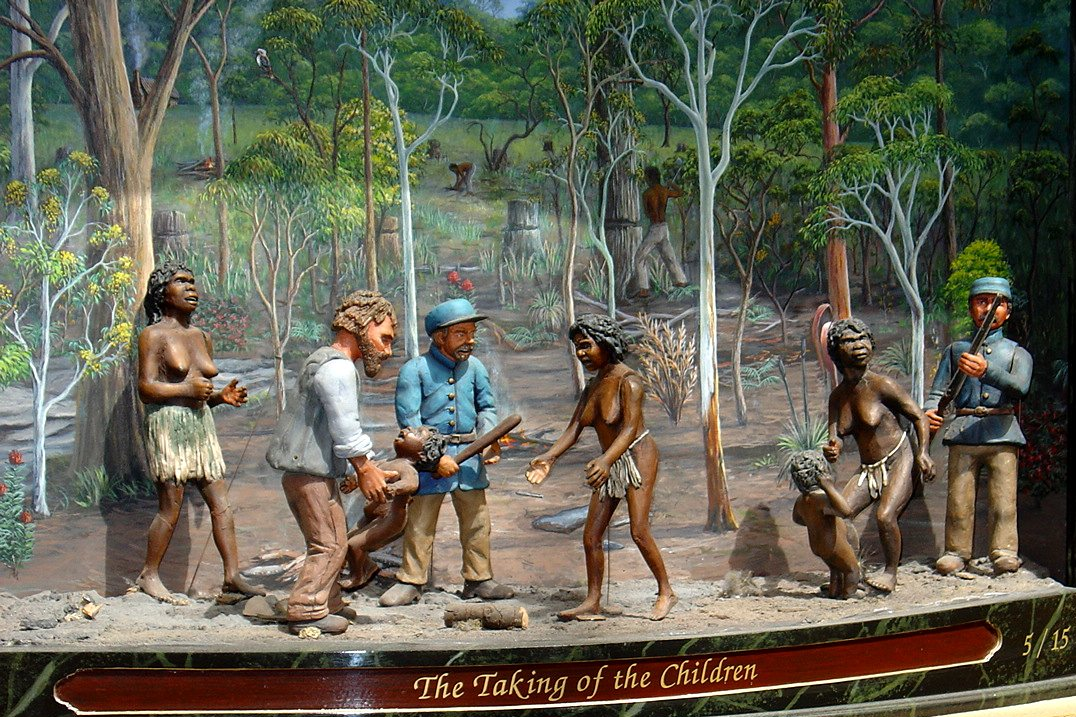
A portrayal entitled The Taking of the Children on the 1999 Great Australian Clock, Queen Victoria Building, Sydney, by artist Chris Cooke

The Stolen Generations (also known as Stolen Children) were the children of Australian Aboriginal and Torres Strait Islander descent who were removed from their families by the Australian federal and state government agencies and church missions, under acts of their respective parliaments. The removals of those referred to as "half-caste" children were conducted in the period between approximately 1905 and 1967, although in some places mixed-race children were still being taken into the 1970s.

Official government estimates are that in certain regions between one in ten and one in three Indigenous Australian children were forcibly taken from their families and communities between 1910 and 1970.

The Bringing Them Home Royal Commission report (1997) described the Australian policies of removing Indigenous children as genocide.

== Emergence of the child-removal policy ==
Numerous 19th and early 20th century contemporaneous documents indicate that the policy of removing mixed-race Aboriginal children from their mothers related to an assumption that the Aboriginal peoples were dying off. Given their catastrophic population decline after white contact, whites assumed that the full-blood tribal Aboriginal population would be unable to sustain itself, and was doomed to extinction. The idea expressed by A. O. Neville, the Chief Protector of Aborigines for Western Australia, and others as late as 1930 was that mixed-race children could be trained to work, and over generations would marry into and be culturally assimilated into white society.

The Colony of Victoria was the first to pass acts (1869 and 1886) that allowed for the removal of mixed-race persons from Aboriginal reserves. An 1899 regulation expressly granted permission for the removal of Aboriginal children from their families.

Some European Australians considered any proliferation of mixed-descent children (labelled "half-castes", "crossbreeds", "quadroons", and "octoroons", terms now considered derogatory to Indigenous Australians) to be a threat to the stability of the prevailing culture, or to a perceived racial or cultural "heritage". The Northern Territory Chief Protector of Aborigines, Dr. Cecil Cook, argued that "everything necessary [must be done] to convert the half-caste into a white citizen".

=== Northern Territory ===
In the Northern Territory, the segregation of Indigenous Australians of mixed descent from "full-blood" Indigenous people began with the government removing children of mixed descent from their communities and placing them in church-run missions, and later creating segregated reserves and compounds to hold all Indigenous Australians. This was a response to public concern over the increase in the number of mixed-descent children and sexual exploitation of young Aboriginal women by non-Indigenous men, as well as fears among non-Indigenous people of being outnumbered by a mixed-descent population.

Under the Northern Territory Aboriginals Act 1910, the Chief Protector of Aborigines was appointed the "legal guardian of every Aboriginal and every half-caste child up to the age of 18 years", thus providing the legal basis for enforcing segregation. After the Commonwealth took control of the Territory, under the Aboriginals Ordinance 1918, the Chief Protector was given total control of all Indigenous women regardless of their age, unless married to a man who was "substantially of European origin", and his approval was required for any marriage of an Indigenous woman to a non-Indigenous man.

== Policy in practice ==
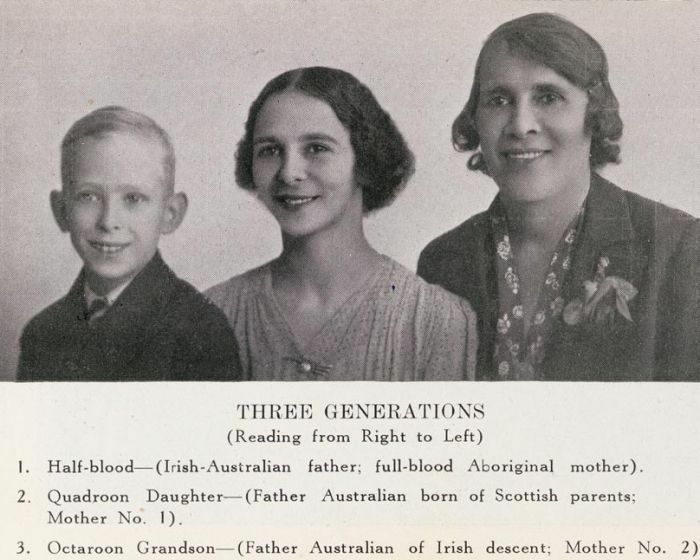
The successive breeding out of "colour" in the Aboriginal population, demonstrated here in A. O. Neville's "Australia's coloured minority" book

The Aboriginal Protection Act 1869 (Vic) included the earliest legislation to authorise child removal from Aboriginal parents. The Central Board for the Protection of Aborigines had been advocating such powers since 1860. Passage of the Act gave the colony of Victoria a wide suite of powers over Aboriginal and "half-caste" persons, including the forcible removal of children, especially "at-risk" girls. Through the late 19th and early 20th century, similar policies and legislation were adopted by other states and territories, such as the Aboriginals Protection and Restriction of the Sale of Opium Act 1897 (Qld), the Aboriginals Ordinance 1918 (NT), the Aborigines Act 1934 (SA), and the 1936 Native Administration Act (WA).

As a result of such legislation, states arranged widespread removal of (primarily) mixed-race children from their Aboriginal mothers. In addition, Aboriginal protectors were appointed in each state who exercised wide-ranging guardianship powers over Aboriginal people up to the age of 16 or 21, often determining where they could live or work. Policemen or other agents of the state (some designated as "Aboriginal Protection Officers") were given the power to locate and transfer babies and children of mixed descent from their mothers, families, and communities into institutions for care. In these Australian states and territories, institutions (both government and missionary) for half-caste children were established in the early decades of the 20th century to care for and to educate the mixed-race children taken from their families, with the goal of assimilation into Anglo-Australian society. Examples of such institutions include Moore River Native Settlement in Western Australia, Doomadgee Aboriginal Mission in Queensland, Ebenezer Mission in Victoria, and Wellington Valley Mission in New South Wales, as well as Catholic missions such as Beagle Bay and Garden Point.

The exact number of children removed is unknown. Estimates of numbers have been widely disputed. The Bringing Them Home report (produced by the National Inquiry into the Separation of Aboriginal and Torres Strait Islander Children from Their Families in 1987), says that "at least 100,000" children were removed from their parents. This figure was estimated by multiplying the Aboriginal population in 1994 (303,000), by the report's maximum estimate of "one in three" Aboriginal persons separated from their families. The report stated that "between one in three and one in ten" children were separated from their families. Given differing populations over a long period of time, different policies at different times in different states (which also resulted in different definitions of target children), and incomplete records, accurate figures are difficult to establish. The academic Robert Manne has stated that the lower-end figure of one in 10 is more likely, estimating that between 20,000 and 25,000 Aboriginal children were removed over six decades, based on a 1994 Australian Bureau of Statistics (ABS) survey of self-identified Indigenous people. According to the Bringing Them Home report:

In certain regions and in certain periods the figure was undoubtedly much greater than one in ten. In that time not one Indigenous family has escaped the effects of forcible removal (confirmed by representatives of the Queensland and WA [Western Australia] Governments in evidence to the Inquiry). Most families have been affected, in one or more generations, by the forcible removal of one or more children.

The report closely examined the distinctions between "forcible removal", "removal under threat or duress", "official deception", "uninformed voluntary release", and "voluntary release". The evidence indicated that in numerous cases, children were brutally and forcibly removed from their parent or parents, possibly even from the hospital shortly after birth, when identified as mixed-race babies. Aboriginal Protection Officers often made the judgement to remove certain children. In some cases, families were required to sign legal documents to relinquish care to the state. In Western Australia, the Aborigines Act 1905 removed the legal guardianship of Aboriginal parents. It made all their children legal wards of the state, so the government did not require parental permission to relocate the mixed-race children to institutions.

In 1915, in New South Wales, the Aborigines Protection Amending Act 1915 gave the Aborigines' Protection Board authority to remove Aboriginal children "without having to establish in court that they were neglected." At the time, some members of Parliament objected to the NSW amendment; one member stated it enabled the Board to "steal the child away from its parents." At least two members argued that the amendment would result in children being subjected to unpaid labour (at institutions or farms) tantamount to "slavery". Writing in the 21st century, Professor Peter Read said that Board members, in recording reasons for removal of children, noted simply "For being Aboriginal."

In 1909, the Protector of Aborigines in South Australia, William Garnet South, reportedly "lobbied for the power to remove Aboriginal children without a court hearing because the courts sometimes refused to accept that the children were neglected or destitute". South argued that "all children of mixed descent should be treated as neglected". His lobbying reportedly played a part in the enactment of the Aborigines Act (1911). This designated his position as the legal guardian of every Aboriginal child in South Australia, not only the so-called "half-castes".

The Bringing Them Home report identified instances of official misrepresentation and deception, such as when caring and able parents were incorrectly described by Aboriginal Protection Officers as not being able to properly provide for their children. In other instances, parents were told by government officials that their child or children had died, even though this was not the case. One first-hand account referring to events in 1935 stated:

I was at the post office with my Mum and Auntie [and cousin]. They put us in the police ute and said they were taking us to Broome. They put the mums in there as well. But when we'd gone [about ten miles (16 km)] they stopped, and threw the mothers out of the car. We jumped on our mothers' backs, crying, trying not to be left behind. But the policemen pulled us off and threw us back in the car. They pushed the mothers away and drove off, while our mothers were chasing the car, running and crying after us. We were screaming in the back of that car. When we got to Broome they put me and my cousin in the Broome lock-up. We were only ten years old. We were in the lock-up for two days waiting for the boat to Perth.

The report discovered that removed children were, in most cases, placed into institutional facilities operated by religious or charitable organisations. A significant number, particularly females, were "fostered" out. Children taken to such institutions were trained to be assimilated to Anglo-Australian culture. Policies included punishment for speaking their local Indigenous languages. The intention was to educate them for a different future and to prevent their being socialised in Aboriginal cultures. The boys were generally trained as agricultural labourers and the girls as domestic servants; these were the chief occupations of many Europeans at the time in the largely rural areas outside cities.

A common aspect of the removals was the failure by these institutions to keep records of the actual parentage of the child, or such details as the date or place of birth. As is stated in the report:

the physical infrastructure of missions, government institutions and children's homes was often very poor and resources were insufficient to improve them or to keep the children adequately clothed, fed and sheltered.

The children were taken into care purportedly to protect them from neglect and abuse. However sexual assault and abuse was widespread, with the report finding that among the 502 inquiry witnesses, 17% of female witnesses and 7.7% of male witnesses reported having suffered a sexual assault while in an institution, at work, or while living with a foster or adoptive family. Beyond this, conditions in the institutions were found to be invariably poor, with severe discipline, excessive child labour, poor nutrition, physical and emotional abuse, and poor quality education. Staff were found to be generally unqualified and given complete control and power over the children.

Documentary evidence, such as newspaper articles and reports to parliamentary committees, suggest a range of rationales. Apparent motivations included the belief that the Aboriginal people would die out, given their catastrophic population decline after white contact, the belief that they were heathens and were better off in non-indigenous households, and the belief that full-blooded Aboriginal people resented miscegenation and the mixed-race children fathered and abandoned by white men.

== Effects on the removed and their descendants ==
=== Removed people ===
By around the age of 18, the children were released from government control.

The stated aim of the "resocialisation" program was to improve the integration of Aboriginal people into modern [European-Australian] society; however, a 1989 study conducted in Melbourne reported that there was no tangible improvement in the social position of "removed" Aboriginal people as compared to "non-removed". Particularly in the areas of employment and post-secondary education, the removed children had about the same results as those who were not removed. In the early decades of the program, post-secondary education was limited for most Australians, but the removed children lagged behind their white contemporaries as educational opportunities improved.

The study indicated that removed Aboriginal people were less likely to have completed a secondary education, three times as likely to have acquired a police record, and were twice as likely to use illicit drugs as were Aboriginal people who grew up in their ethnic community. The only notable advantage "removed" Aboriginal people achieved was a higher average income. The report noted this was likely due to the increased urbanisation of removed individuals, and greater access to welfare payments than for Aboriginal people living in remote communities.

The Bringing Them Home report condemned the policy of disconnecting children from their cultural heritage. One witness said to the commission:

I've got everything that could be reasonably expected: a good home environment, education, stuff like that, but that's all material stuff. It's all the non-material stuff that I didn't have—the lineage... You know, you've just come out of nowhere; there you are.

In 2015, many of the recommendations of Bringing Them Home were yet to be fulfilled. In 2025, it was reported that only 6% of recommendations had been implemented.

As of 2022–23, around 200,000 people (nearly half of all adult Indigenous Australians) have a parent, grandparent, aunt, or uncle who was removed from their family. A 2026 study by the Australian Institute of Health and Welfare (AIHW), which had been commissioned by the Healing Foundation, studied data collected in 2022 and 2023 on Stolen Generation survivors (now all over 50) and their descendants. It found that, compared with other Indigenous people, survivors more likely to have severe or profound disability and more likely to have been admitted to hospital in the previous year. Compared with non-Indigenous Australians, survivors were much more likely to have kidney disease, a severe or profound disability, or high psychological distress, and also experienced greater socioeconomic difficulties.

=== Generational effects ===
A 2019 study by the AIHW found that children living in households with members of the Stolen Generations are more likely "to experience a range of adverse outcomes", including poor health, especially mental health, missing school and living in poverty. There are high incidences of anxiety, depression, PTSD and suicide, along with alcohol abuse, among the Stolen Generations, with this resulting in unstable parenting and family situations.

According to the 2026 AIHW report, descendants of Stolen Generations "were 1.3 times more likely both to report high psychological distress and to be diagnosed with a mental health condition".

== Public awareness and recognition ==
Historian Professor Peter Read, then at the Australian National University, was the first to use the phrase "stolen generation". He published a magazine article on the topic with this title, based on his research. He expanded the article into a book, The Stolen Generations (1981). Widespread awareness of the Stolen Generations, and the practices that created them, grew in the late 1980s through the efforts of Aboriginal and white activists, artists, and musicians (Archie Roach's "Took the Children Away" and Midnight Oil's "The Dead Heart" being examples of the latter). The Mabo v Queensland (No 2) case (commonly known as the Mabo case) attracted great media and public attention to itself and to all issues related to the government treatment of Aboriginal people and Torres Strait Islanders in Australia, and most notably the Stolen Generations.

In early 1995, Rob Riley, an activist with the Aboriginal Legal Service, published Telling Our Story. It described the large-scale negative effects of past government policies that resulted in the removal of thousands of mixed-race Aboriginal children from their families and their being reared in a variety of conditions in missions, orphanages, reserves, and white foster homes.

The Australian Human Rights and Equal Opportunity Commission's National Inquiry into the Separation of Aboriginal and Torres Strait Islander Children from Their Families commenced in May 1995, presided over by the Commission's president Sir Ronald Wilson and its Aboriginal and Torres Strait Islander Social Justice Commissioner Mick Dodson. During the ensuing 17 months, the Inquiry visited every state and Territory in Australia, heard testimony from 535 Aboriginal Australians, and received submissions of evidence from more than 600 more. In April 1997, the Commission released its official Bringing Them Home report.

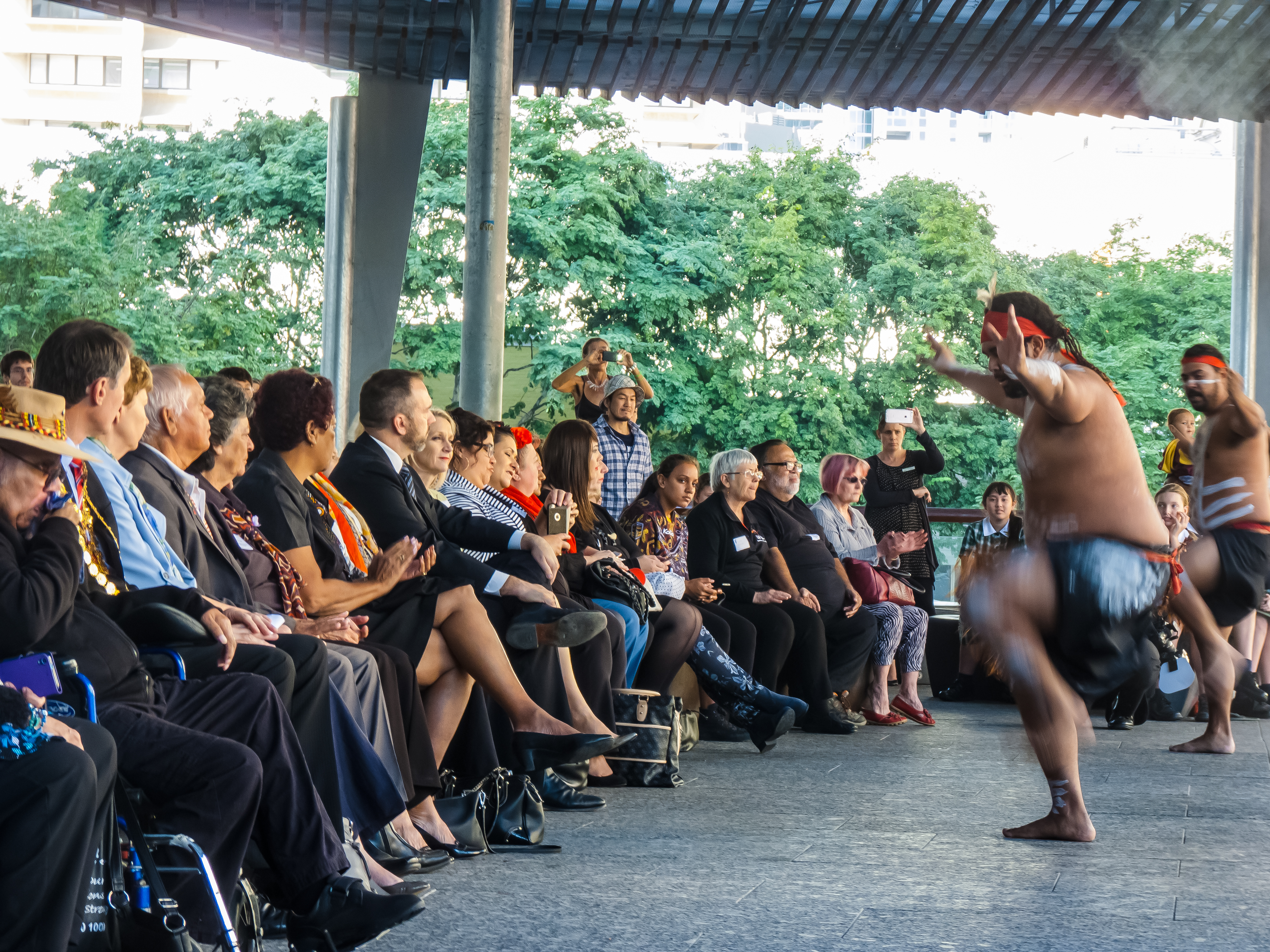
The Lord Mayor's National Sorry Day in Brisbane, May 26, 2016, honoring Aboriginal culture and commemorating mistreatment of Indigenous Australians

Between the commissioning of the National Inquiry and the release of the final report in 1997, the government of John Howard had replaced the Paul Keating government. At the Australian Reconciliation Convention in May 1997, Howard was quoted as saying: "Australians of this generation should not be required to accept guilt and blame for past actions and policies."

Following publication of the report, the parliament of the Northern Territory and the state parliaments of Victoria, South Australia, and New South Wales passed formal apologies to the Aboriginal people affected. On 26 May 1998, the first "National Sorry Day" was held; reconciliation events such as the Walk for Reconciliation across Sydney Harbour Bridge and in other cities were held nationally, and attended by a total of more than one million people. As public pressure continued to increase on the government, Howard drafted a Motion of Reconciliation with Senator Aden Ridgeway, expressing "deep and sincere regret over the removal of Aboriginal children from their parents", which was passed by the federal parliament in August 1999. Howard said that the Stolen Generation represented "the most blemished chapter in the history of this country".

Activists took the issue of the Stolen Generations to the United Nations Commission on Human Rights. At its hearing on this subject in July 2000, the Commission on Human Rights strongly criticised the Howard government for its handling of issues related to the Stolen Generations. The UN Committee on the Elimination of Racial Discrimination concluded its discussion of Australia's 12th report on its actions by acknowledging "the measures taken to facilitate family reunion and to improve counselling and family support services for the victims", but expressed concern:

that the Commonwealth Government does not support a formal national apology and that it considers inappropriate the provision of monetary compensation for those forcibly and unjustifiably separated from their families, on the grounds that such practices were sanctioned by law at the time and were intended to "assist the people whom they affected".

The Committee recommended "that the State party consider the need to address appropriately the extraordinary harm inflicted by these racially discriminatory practices."

Activists highlighted the Stolen Generations and related Aboriginal issues during the Sydney 2000 Summer Olympics. They set up a large "Aboriginal Tent City" on the grounds of Sydney University to bring attention to Aboriginal issues in general. Cathy Freeman is an Aboriginal athlete who was chosen to light the Olympic flame and won the gold medal in the 400 metre sprint. In interviews, she said that her own grandmother was a victim of forced removal. The internationally successful rock group Midnight Oil attracted worldwide media interest by performing at the Olympic closing ceremony in black sweatsuits with the word "SORRY" emblazoned across them.

In 2000, Australian journalist Phillip Knightley summed up the Stolen Generations in these terms:

This cannot be over-emphasized—the Australian government literally kidnapped these children from their parents as a matter of policy. White welfare officers, often supported by police, would descend on Aboriginal camps, round up all the children, separate the ones with light-coloured skin, bundle them into trucks and take them away. If their parents protested they were held at bay by police.

According to the archaeologist and writer Josephine Flood, "The well-meaning but ill-conceived policy of forced assimilation of mixed-race Aborigines is now universally condemned for the trauma and loss of language and culture it brought to the stolen children and their families."

== Australian federal parliament apology ==
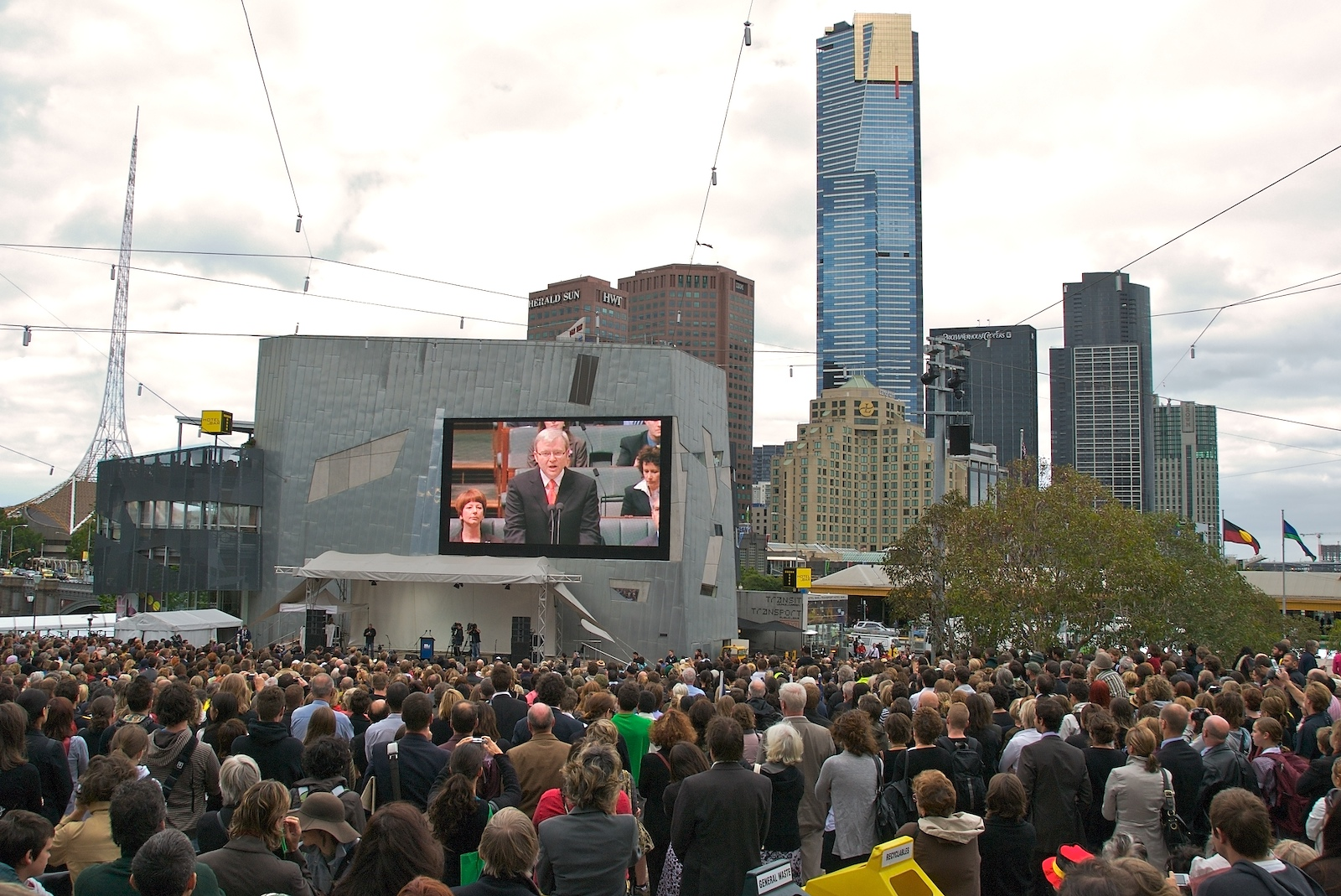
Kevin Rudd on screen in Federation Square, Melbourne, apologising to the stolen generations.

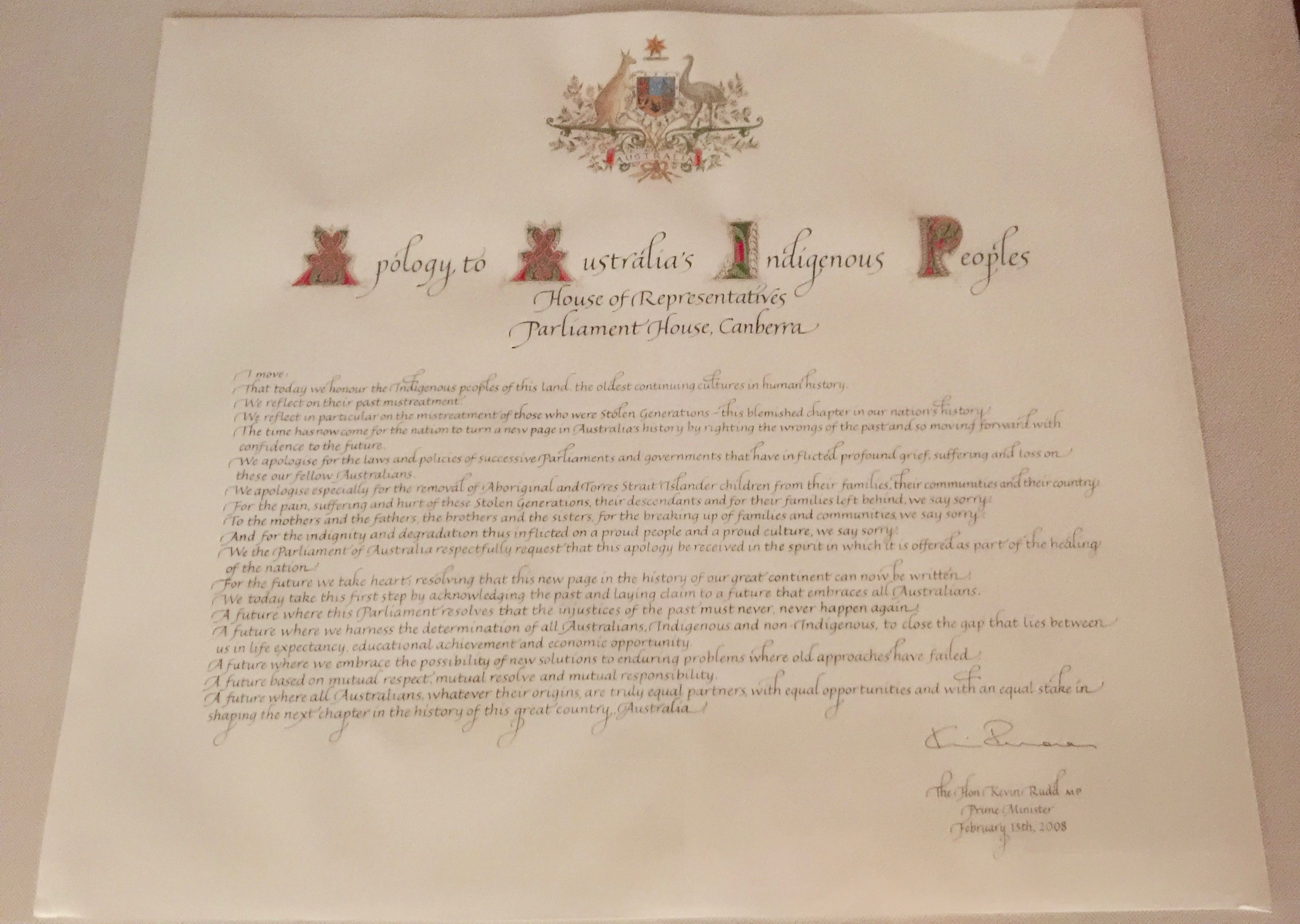
Apology to Australia's Indigenous Peoples. Taken at Parliament House, Canberra.

One of the recommendations of the 1997 Bringing Them Home report was for Australian parliaments to offer an official apology. A decade later, on 13 February 2008, Prime Minister Kevin Rudd presented an apology to Indigenous Australians as a motion to be voted on by the house. The apology text was as follows:

I move:

That today we honour the Indigenous peoples of this land, the oldest continuing cultures in human history.
We reflect on their past mistreatment.
We reflect in particular on the mistreatment of those who were Stolen Generations—this blemished chapter in our nation's history.
The time has now come for the nation to turn a new page in Australia's history by righting the wrongs of the past and so moving forward with confidence to the future.
We apologise for the laws and policies of successive Parliaments and governments that have inflicted profound grief, suffering and loss on these our fellow Australians.
We apologise especially for the removal of Aboriginal and Torres Strait Islander children from their families, their communities and their country.
For the pain, suffering, and hurt of these Stolen Generations, their descendants and for their families left behind, we say sorry.
To the mothers and the fathers, the brothers and the sisters, for the breaking up of families and communities, we say sorry.
And for the indignity and degradation thus inflicted on a proud people and a proud culture, we say sorry.
We the Parliament of Australia respectfully request that this apology be received in the spirit in which it is offered as part of the healing of the nation.
For the future we take heart; resolving that this new page in the history of our great continent can now be written.
We today take this first step by acknowledging the past and laying claim to a future that embraces all Australians.
A future where this Parliament resolves that the injustices of the past must never, never happen again.
A future where we harness the determination of all Australians, Indigenous and non-Indigenous, to close the gap that lies between us in life expectancy, educational achievement, and economic opportunity.
A future where we embrace the possibility of new solutions to enduring problems where old approaches have failed.
A future based on mutual respect, mutual resolve and mutual responsibility.

A future where all Australians, whatever their origins, are truly equal partners, with equal opportunities and with an equal stake in shaping the next chapter in the history of this great country, Australia.

— Kevin Rudd, Prime Minister of Australia, 13 February 2008, at a sitting of the Parliament of Australia.

The text of the apology did not refer to compensation to Aboriginal people generally or to members of the Stolen Generations specifically. Rudd followed the apology with a 20-minute speech to the house about the need for this action. The government's apology and his speech were widely applauded among both Indigenous Australians and the non-Indigenous general public.

Opposition leader Brendan Nelson also delivered a 20-minute speech. He endorsed the apology but in his speech Nelson referred to the "under-policing" of child welfare in Aboriginal communities, as well as a host of social ills blighting the lives of Aboriginal people. His speech was considered controversial and received mixed reactions. Thousands of people who had gathered in public spaces in around Australia to hear the apology turned their backs on the screens that broadcast Nelson speaking. In Perth, people booed and jeered until the screen was switched off. In Parliament House's Great Hall, elements of the audience began a slow clap, with some finally turning their backs.

The apology was unanimously adopted by the House of Representatives, although six members of Nelson's opposition caucus left the House in protest at the apology. Later that day, the Senate considered a motion for an identical apology, which was also passed unanimously. Beforehand, the Leader of the Greens, Senator Bob Brown, attempted to amend the motion to include words committing parliament to offering compensation to those who suffered loss under past Indigenous policies, but was opposed by all the other parties.

== Legal cases and compensation ==
The states all have redress schemes: first Tasmania (2006), followed by Western Australia (2007), Queensland (2012), South Australia (2015), New South Wales (2017) and Victoria (2022), while a redress scheme for the territories, formerly controlled by the Commonwealth Government, was announced in August 2021.

For victims of sexual abuse, there is also National Redress Scheme, set up in the wake of the Royal Commission into Institutional Responses to Child Sexual Abuse, which started on 1 July 2019 and open for applications until 30 June 2027.

=== New South Wales ===
Compensation claims have been heard by the NSW Supreme Court's Court of Appeal in Williams v The Minister Aboriginal Land Rights Act 1983 and New South Wales [2000] NSWCA 255 and the Australian Federal Court in Cubillo v Commonwealth of Australia [2000] FCA 1084. In Williams, an individual (rather than a group of plaintiffs) made claims in negligence arising from having been placed under the control of the Aborigines Welfare Board pursuant to s 7(2) of the Aborigines Welfare Act 1909 shortly after her birth, and was placed by the Board with the United Aborigines Mission at its Aborigines Children Home at Bomaderry near Nowra, NSW. The trial judge found that there was no duty of care and therefore that an action in negligence could not succeed. This was upheld by the NSW Court of Appeal in 2000.

In relation to whether the action in NSW courts was limited by the passage of time, the Court of Appeal, reversing Studert J, extended the limitation period for the non-equitable claims by about three decades pursuant to s 60G of the Limitation Act 1969 (Williams v Minister, Aboriginal Land Rights Act 1983 (1994) 35 NSWLR 497).

Australian Prime Minister Kevin Rudd's 2008 Apology to Australia's Indigenous peoples was not expected to have any legal effect on claims for compensation in NSW.

New South Wales set up a scheme running from 1 July 2017 until 30 June 2022, enabling survivors to claim A$75,000 compensation. Its funding also allows for a healing fund, allocating grants to healing centres, memorials and keeping places, as well as a separate fund to help fund Stolen Generations members' funerals. There were estimated to be between 700 and 1,300 survivors in NSW in 2017.

=== Queensland ===
Queensland has the Redress Scheme that provides compensation payments ranging from $7000 to $40,000 to people who experienced abuse and neglect as children in Queensland institutions (Government of Queensland 2012). The scheme is not exclusive for Indigenous peoples but is for anyone who experienced abuse as a child whilst in state care.

=== South Australia ===
In June 1998, Bruce Trevorrow, a Ngarrindjeri man, sued the South Australian Government for pain and suffering suffered as a result of his being removed from his parents when he was a baby. On 1 August 2007, aged 50, Trevorrow became the first member of the Stolen Generations to be awarded compensation by a court of law, when it awarded him A$525,000. The SA government appealed in February 2008, but lost their appeal in March 2010, but Trevorrow had died only a few months after they lodged the appeal.

The South Australian reparations scheme was set up in November 2015, after a 2013 parliamentary committee reported that such a fund would be cheaper than fighting legal claims. The fund allows for around 300 eligible people to receive up to A$50,000 each. A A$6 million Individual Reparations Scheme provided ex-gratia payments to Aboriginal people who were eligible for reparations, and in 2018, a payment of A$20,000 was made to eligible applicants, with an additional A$10,000 to follow. After the total fund of A$16 million was underspent, the Community Reparations Fund was established to support projects that would promote healing for the Stolen Generations, their families and the wider community.

=== Tasmania ===
In October 2006, the Tasmanian Government allocated a package of A$5 million to fund various reconciliation measures, including compensation for affected people, or their descendants if no longer living, under the Stolen Generation of Aboriginal Children Act 2006. In a first for the country, 106 people were found to qualify for the payments.

=== Victoria ===
On 3 March 2022, Victorian Premier Daniel Andrews announced a reparations package worth A$155 million. Aboriginal Victorians who were removed before 1977 are able to access payments of A$100,000 each. Each person deemed eligible will also receive a personal apology from the Victorian Government and access to healing programs. It is thought that around 12000 people will be eligible to access the payments and programs. The reparations package was raised as a key issue at the first meeting of the First Peoples' Assembly of Victoria in 2020, and Andrews acknowledged that it was long overdue. Applications open on 31 March 2022.

=== Western Australia ===
Western Australia has a redress scheme that is not exclusive for Indigenous peoples but is for anyone who experienced abuse as a child whilst in state care.

=== Territories ===
==== Kruger v Commonwealth ====
In Kruger v Commonwealth, decided in 1997, also known as the Stolen Generation Case, the High Court of Australia rejected a challenge to the validity of legislation applying in the Northern Territory between 1918 and 1957 which authorised the removal of Aboriginal children from their families. The majority of the bench found that the Aboriginals Ordinance 1918 was beneficial in intent and had neither the purpose of genocide nor that of restricting the practice of religion. The High Court unanimously held there was no separate action for a breach of any constitutional right.

==== 21st century ====
A compensation fund worth A$378 million was announced by the federal government on 6 August 2021, to be used to award one-off payments of A$75,000 in recognition of the harm suffered as well as A$7,000 to pay for counselling, for survivors of the Stolen Generations in the Northern Territory, Australian Capital Territory and Jervis Bay Territory.

A class action on behalf of around 1700 deceased estates and family members was launched in the Northern Territory in 2021. In August 2022 the Commonwealth agreed to pay compensation of over A$50 million to the claimants, pending formal approval from the New South Wales Supreme Court.

== Historical debate ==
=== Use of the word "stolen" ===
The word "stolen" is used here to refer to the Aboriginal children having been taken away from their families. It has been in use for this since the early 20th century. For instance, Patrick McGarry, a member of the Parliament of New South Wales, objected to the Aborigines Protection Amending Act 1915 which authorised the Aborigines' Protection Board to remove Aboriginal children from their parents without having to establish cause. McGarry described the policy as "steal[ing] the child away from its parents".

In 1924, the Adelaide Sun wrote: "The word 'stole' may sound a bit far-fetched but by the time we have told the story of the heart-broken Aboriginal mother we are sure the word will not be considered out of place."

In most jurisdictions, Indigenous Australians were put under the authority of a Protector, effectively being made wards of the State. The protection was done through each jurisdiction's Aboriginal Protection Board; in Victoria and Western Australia these boards were also responsible for applying what were known as Half-Caste Acts.

More recent usage has developed since Peter Read's publication of The Stolen Generations: The Removal of Aboriginal Children in New South Wales 1883 to 1969 (1981), which examined the history of these government actions. The 1997 publication of the government's Bringing Them Home – Report of the National Inquiry into the Separation of Aboriginal and Torres Strait Islander Children from Their Families heightened awareness of the Stolen Generations. The acceptance of the term in Australia is illustrated by the 2008 formal apology to the Stolen Generations, led by Prime Minister Kevin Rudd and passed by both houses of the Parliament of Australia. Previous apologies had been offered by State and Territory governments in the period 1997–2001.

Some have objected to the use of the term "Stolen Generations". Former Prime Minister John Howard did not believe the government should apologise to the Australian Aboriginal peoples. Then Minister for Aboriginal and Torres Strait Islander Affairs John Herron disputed usage of the term in April 2000. Others who disputed the use of the term include Peter Howson, Minister for Aboriginal Affairs from 1971 to 1972, and Keith Windschuttle, an historian who argues that some of the abuses towards Australian Aboriginal peoples have been exaggerated and in some cases invented. Many historians argue against these denials, including to Windschuttle in particular. Anthropologist Ron Brunton also criticised the proceedings on the basis that there was no cross-examination of those giving their testimonies or critical examination of the factual basis of the testimony.

The Bringing Them Home report provided extensive details about the removal programs and their effects. Sir Ronald Wilson, former President of the Human Rights and Equal Opportunities Commission and a Commissioner on the Inquiry, stated that "when it comes to the credibility of those stories, there is ample credibility, not from the cross-examination of the children themselves, but from the governments whose laws, practices and policies enabled these forced removals to take place. We had the support of every State government; they came to the Inquiry, came with lever-arch files setting out the laws from the earliest days right up to the end of the assimilation policy, that is up to the 1970s and more importantly, senior government officers attended. In every case, these senior officers acknowledged that there was a lot of cruelty in the application of those laws and policies."

In April 2000, Aboriginal Affairs Minister John Herron tabled a report in the Australian Parliament in response to the Human Rights Commission report which stated that, as "only 10% of Aboriginal children" had been removed, they did not constitute an entire "generation". The report attracted media attention and protests. Herron apologised for the "understandable offence taken by some people" as a result of his comments, although he refused to alter the report as it had been tabled.

Historian Peter Read referred to the children affected as the "Stolen Generations". Another historian, Robert Manne, defended that terminology, making the analogy that other people refer to the "generation that lost their lives in the First World War" without meaning over 50 per cent of the young people at the time; rather, people use that phrasing as a metaphor for a collective experience. Similarly, he believes, some of the Aboriginal community use the term to describe their collective suffering.

=== Genocide debate ===
There is ongoing contention among politicians, commentators, and historical, political, and legal experts as to whether the forced removals of Aboriginal and Torres Strait Islander children that occurred during the Stolen Generations can be accurately described as genocidal acts, and particularly whether they meet the definition of genocide in article II (e) of the UN Convention on the Prevention and Punishment of the Crime of Genocide. While it is generally not disputed that these forced removals occurred, the contention surrounds whether they were enacted with the intention of destroying the Indigenous people of Australia. There is further contention as to whether those responsible for the Stolen Generations should be criminally liable for genocide. In response to a submission by the National Aboriginal and Islander Legal Services Secretariat to the Royal Commission into Aboriginal Deaths in Custody, Commissioner Johnston considered whether the policies and practices of the Australian Governments pertinent to the Stolen Generations constituted a breach of the Convention but concluded that "[i]t is not my function to interpret the Convention or to decide whether it has been breached, particularly since the policies involved were modified in 1962 somewhat and abandoned by 1970". The Bringing Them Home report concluded that:

The Australian practice of Indigenous child removal involved both systematic racial discrimination and genocide as defined by international law. Yet it continued to be practised as official policy long after being clearly prohibited by treaties to which Australia had voluntarily subscribed.

However, in the subsequent case of Kruger v Commonwealth, the High Court judges rejected the claim of the plaintiffs that the Aboriginals Ordinance 1918 authorised genocide as defined by the Convention and ruled that there was no legislation to implement the Convention under Australian municipal law at the time. One of the recommendations of the Bringing Them Home report was that 'the Commonwealth legislate to implement the Genocide Convention with full domestic effect'. While genocide has been a crime under international law since the commencement of the Convention in 1951, in accordance with Section 51(xxix) of the Australian Constitution, it has only been a crime under Australian law since the commencement of the International Criminal Court (Consequential Amendments) Act 2002, and so the Stolen Generations cannot be considered genocide under Australian law because the Act is not retrospective. In its twelfth report to the UN Committee on the Elimination of Racial Discrimination, the Australian Government argued that the removal policies and programs did not constitute a breach of the Convention.

In 1997, Sir Ronald Wilson, then President of the Australian Human Rights and Equal Opportunity Commission, commissioner of the National Inquiry into the Separation of Aboriginal and Torres Strait Islander Children from Their Families, and co-author of the Bringing Them Home report, argued that the policies resulting in the Stolen Generations constitute attempted genocide: he stated, "It clearly was attempted genocide. It was believed that the Aboriginal people would die out."

Manne argues that the expressed views of government bureaucrats, such as A. O. Neville, to culturally assimilate the mixed-race children into the white population by means of "breeding out the colour", and therefore eventually resulting in the full-bloods being "forgotten", bore strong similarities to the racial views of the Nazis in 1930s Nazi Germany. Manne states that, though the term "genocide" had not yet entered the English language, the policies of Neville and others were termed by some contemporaries as the "die out" or "breed out" policy, giving an indication of their proposed intent. He also states that the Bringing Them Home report's argument that Australian authorities had committed genocide by removing indigenous children from their families has since been "generally acknowledged" to be wrong, since cultural assimilation is not legally regarded as genocide.

Though genocide historian Paul Bartrop rejects the use of the word genocide to describe Australian colonial history in general, he does believe that it applies to describing the Stolen Generations. Bartrop and US genocide scholar Samuel Totten together wrote the Dictionary of Genocide, for which Bartrop wrote the entry on Australia. He said he used as the benchmark for usage of the term genocide the 1948 UN Convention on the Prevention and Punishment of the Crime of Genocide, which is also cited in the Bringing Them Home report.

In 2006, Australian historian Patrick Wolfe wrote:

To take an example from genocide's definitional core, Article II (d) of the UN Convention on Genocide, which seems to have been relatively overlooked in Australian discussions, includes among the acts that constitute genocide (assuming they are committed with intent to destroy a target group in whole or in part) the imposition of "measures intended to prevent births within the group." Given that the Australian practice of abducting Aboriginal children, assuming its "success", would bring about a situation in which second-generation offspring were born into a group that was different from the one from which the child/parent had originally been abducted, there is abundant evidence of genocide being practised in post-war Australia on the basis of Article II (d) alone.

In 2008, Australian historian Inga Clendinnen suggested that the term genocide rests on the "question of intentionality", saying: "There's not much doubt, with great murderous performances that were typically called genocide, that they were deliberate and intentional. Beyond that, it always gets very murky."

== Trauma and healing ==
Trauma suffered as a result of children being separated from their families and forced to adopt a culture foreign to them is ongoing and passed down through generations.

The Healing Foundation is a government-funded body established on 30 October 2009 as the Aboriginal and Torres Strait Islander Healing Foundation was established after several months of consultation with community representatives. The head office is in Canberra, with branches in Melbourne, Brisbane, Adelaide, Darwin and on the Torres Strait Islands. As of 2020 the Foundation had provided funding for more than 175 community organisations to develop and run healing projects, "to address the ongoing trauma caused by actions like the forced removal of children from their families". It also conducts research into Indigenous healing.

The Marumali Program was designed and established by Stolen Generations survivor Lorraine Peeters, starting with her presentation of the model she had created, the "Marumali Journey of Healing Model", to a conference of mental health professionals at a conference in Sydney in 1999. Her body of work was copyrighted and subsequently circulated to and used by many organisations to help survivors to heal from specific types of trauma suffered as a result of the removals. Peeters then developed the Marumali Program to train Indigenous counsellors to use her model. As of June 2020, she and her daughter continue to give workshops, both in the community and in prisons. Marumali is a Gamilaroi word meaning "to put back together", and she says it relates to the ultimate goal of reconnecting with what has been lost. She continues to advise the Healing Foundation.

== In the arts ==
=== Documentary ===
- The documentary Lousy Little Sixpence (1983) was the first film to deal with the Stolen Generations. Directed and produced by Alec Morgan, it won several international and Australian awards. The Australian Broadcasting Corporation did not air it for two years. The film is now standard fare in educational institutions, and has been highly influential.
- The documentary film Kanyini (2006), directed by Melanie Hogan, featured Bob Randall. He is an elder of the Yankunytjatjara people and one of the listed traditional owners of Uluru. He was taken away from his mother as a child, living at the government reservation until he was 20, and working at various jobs, including as a carpenter, stockman, and crocodile hunter. He helped establish the Adelaide Community College and has lectured on Aboriginal cultures. He served as the director of the Northern Australia Legal Aid Service and established Aboriginal and Torres Strait Islander centres at the Australian National University, University of Canberra, and University of Wollongong.
- Episode 5, "Unhealthy Government Experiment", of the 1998 SBS documentary television series First Australians concerns the Stolen Generations in Western Australia.

=== Fiction films and TV ===
- The Australian film Rabbit-Proof Fence (2002), directed by Phillip Noyce, was loosely based on the book Follow the Rabbit-Proof Fence by Doris Pilkington Garimara. It concerns the author's mother and two other mixed-race Aboriginal girls who ran away from Moore River Native Settlement, north of Perth, and returned to their Aboriginal families. In a subsequent interview with the ABC, Doris recalled her removal from her mother at age three or four, and subsequent rearing at the settlement. She was not reunited with her mother until she was 25; all those years, she believed that her mother had given her away. When the two women were reunited, Doris was no longer able to speak her native language and had been taught to regard Indigenous culture as evil.
- Baz Luhrmann's 2008 film Australia, starring Nicole Kidman and Hugh Jackman, deals with the Stolen Generations.
- The Australian film The Sapphires (2012), written by Tony Briggs and based on his 2004 stage play of the same name, tells the story of an Aboriginal girl group performing in Vietnam during the Vietnam War, with one member having been stolen from her family as a child. The film is loosely based on the lives of Briggs' mother and aunt.

=== Stage ===
- Stolen (1998) is a play by Australian playwright Jane Harrison. It tells the story of five fictional Aboriginal people by the names of Sandy, Ruby, Jimmy, Anne, and Shirley who dealt with the issues for forceful removal by Australian governments.
- The Indigenous opera Pecan Summer (2010) by Deborah Cheetham, which premiered in Mooroopna, is set at Federation Square, in Melbourne, on the day of Kevin Rudd's apology, and quotes some of his words.

=== Literature ===
- Bryce Courtenay's novel Jessica tells of a case brought in a New South Wales court against the Aboriginal Protection Board. It challenged the Aboriginal Protection Act of 1909 in order to return two children from Cootamundra Domestic Training Home for Aboriginal Girls to the Aboriginal mother.
- Aboriginal artist and author Sally Morgan has written several novels based on the lives of her and her family members, featuring intimate portrayals of the impact of forced removal on individuals, their families, and communities, although Sally herself was not a stolen child. Her first, My Place, involves her quest to uncover her Aboriginal heritage which had previously been denied by her family, who insisted "as a survival mechanism" that they were of Indian extraction.
- Benang is Kim Scott's second novel. Benang is about forced assimilation and finding how one can return to one's own culture. The novel presents how difficult it is to form a working history of a population who had been historically uprooted from its past. Benang follows Harley, a young man who has gone through the process of "breeding out the colour", as he pieces together his family history through documentation, such as photograph and his grandfather's notes, as well as memories and experiences. Harley and his family have undergone a process of colonial scientific experimentation called "breeding of the colour", which separated individuals from their indigenous families and origins.

=== Music ===
- "Took the Children Away" (1990) Song by Archie Roach (himself a stolen child)

== Notable people ==
- Gordon Briscoe (1938-2023), Doctor of Indigenous History, Order of Australia
- Jack Charles (1943–2022), stage and screen actor and activist
- Deborah Cheetham, soprano, actor, composer and playwright
- Katherine Mary Clutterbuck (Sister Kate)
- Ken Colbung, political activist and leader
- Ningali Cullen (1942–2012), co-chair of the National Sorry Day Committee
- Belinda Dann, born Quinlyn Warrakoo, forced name change to Belinda Boyd, deceased at 107 years of age, making her the longest-lived member of the Stolen Generation
- Lorna Fejo (1930-2022), the Warumungu woman named by Kevin Rudd, in his Apology to the Stolen Generations in 2008
- Sue Gordon (born 1943), retired Perth Children's Court magistrate
- Ruby Hunter (1955–2010), singer-songwriter and partner of Archie Roach
- A. O. Neville, WA Protector Of Aborigines from 1915 to 1945 and advocate of the removal of children
- May O'Brien (1932–2020), WA educator and author
- Lowitja O'Donoghue, AC, CBE, DSG, nurse, public administrator and Indigenous rights activist
- Doris Pilkington Garimara, author of Follow the Rabbit-Proof Fence
- Bob Randall, Indigenous Australian of the Year
- Aunty Isabel Reid (born 1932), who in 2021 became the oldest living survivor of those forcibly removed under the Aborigines Protection Act 1909 (NSW), having been sent to the Cootamundra Domestic Training Home for Aboriginal Girls
- Rob Riley (1954–1996), CEO of the Aboriginal Legal Service 1990–1995, author of Telling Our Story which instigated the National Inquiry into Separation of Aboriginal and Torres Strait Islander Children from their Families
- Archie Roach (1956–2022), singer-songwriter and activist, partner of Ruby Hunter
- Cedric Wyatt, Chief Executive Officer of the Department of Aboriginal Affairs in Western Australia

== "White stolen generations" ==
The term "Stolen Generations" is usually reserved for Indigenous people. However, during the same period from the 1930s to 1982, around 250,000 Australian-born non-Indigenous children were also removed from parents who were deemed "unfit", and forcibly adopted. The terms "white stolen generations" or "forgotten Australians" have been used by survivors of this practice.

== See also ==
- Aboriginal Protection Board
- Aboriginal reserve
- American Indian boarding schools
- Australian Legislative Ethics Commission
- Canadian Indian residential school system
- Cultural assimilation of Native Americans
- Cultural genocide
- Forced adoption
- Hidden Generations, Indigenous peoples who responded to colonial forces in Australia by reducing their visibility
- Institutional abuse
- Kinder der Landstrasse ("children of the highway"), program of forced removal and institutionalization of children of nomadic Yenish groups in Switzerland during the 20th century
- Kidnapping of children by Nazi Germany
- Little Danes experiment, program of forced removal of Greenlandic Inuit children in Denmark
- Lost children of Francoism, children of Republican parents abducted during the Spanish Civil War
- Moseley Royal Commission, 1934 Royal Commission investigating the treatment of Aboriginal people in Western Australia
- Native schools in New Zealand
- Native Tongue Title, a revivalistic term that refers to compensation for linguicide (language killing)
- Northern Territory National Emergency Response, controversial legislation affecting Indigenous Australians in Western Australia from 2007-2012
- Norwegianization of Sámi and Kvens
- Our Generation (2010 Australian documentary)
- Persecution of Uyghurs in China
- Protector of Aborigines
- Sixties Scoop, the removal of children from Indigenous families in Canada beginning in the 1960s
- Tinker Experiment, program of forced relocation of Scottish Romani and Traveller families
- Yemenite Children Affair, removal and disappearance of Yemenite children in Israel from 1948-1954

== Further reading and external links ==
=== Bibliography and guides ===
- Stolen Generations Bibliography: A select bibliography of published references to the separation of Aboriginal families (and) the removal of Aboriginal children Australian Institute of Aboriginal and Torres Strait Islander Studies (AIATSIS)
- Background note: "Sorry": the unfinished business of the Bringing Them Home report, Australian Parliamentary Library, 4 February 2008
- Bibliography on Kahlin Compound at the Northern Territory Library. (PDF)

=== Human Rights and Equal Opportunity Commission ===
- Response to government to the national apology to the Stolen Generations' by Tom Calma – 13 February 2008
- Resources on Bringing Them Home
  - Bringing them Home Report (1997), Australian Human Rights Commission
  - Education module on the separation of Aboriginal and Torres Strait Islander Children from their Families (2007)
- Apologies by State and Territory Parliaments (1997–2001)

=== Government ===
- Reparations for the Stolen Generations in New South Wales Parliament of NSW
- Bringing Them Home oral history interviews at the National Library of Australia
- Moseley, Henry Doyle 1935, Report of the Royal Commissioner appointed to investigate, report, and advise upon matters in relation to the condition and treatment of Aborigines
- Aboriginal welfare : initial conference of Commonwealth and state Aboriginal authorities held at Canberra, 21 to 23 April 1937
- An Index to the Chief Protector of Aborigines Files 1898 – 1908
- Guide to Institutions Attended by Aboriginal People in Western Australia Compiled by researchers employed by the State Solicitor's Office (PDF)
- Sister Kate's on the WA Government Heritage Register
- West Australian Government history of Noongar in the South West
- Aboriginal Western Australia and Federation
- Queenslanders reflect – digital stories capturing responses to the 2008 Apology
- Mount Isa responses to the Apology – digital stories
- Response to the Apology – Collection of digital stories held at State Library of Queensland

=== Academic sources ===
- Buti, Tony. "The systematic removal of indigenous children from their families in Australia and Canada: the history – similarities and differences" (PDF). New South Wales: University of Newcastle. Archived from the original (PDF) on 18 March 2009.
- Copland, Mark Stephen (2005). Calculating Lives: The Numbers and Narratives of Forced Removals in Queensland 1859 – 1972 (Thesis). Brisbane, Australia: Griffith University. Archived from the original on 23 August 2006.
- Delmege, Sharon. "A Trans-Generational Effect of The Aborigines Act 1905 (WA): The Making of the Fringedwellers in the South-West of Western Australia". E Law: Murdoch University Electronic Journal of Law. 12 (1 & 2).
- van Krieken, Robert. "The stolen generations: implications for Australian civilization, citizenship and governance". University of Sydney (Australia). Archived from the original on 16 December 2008. Research project.
- Larbalestier, Jen (2004). "White Over Black: Discourses of Whiteness in Australian Culture". Borderlands e-Journal. 3 (2). Archived from the original on 16 June 2008. Focuses on debates about representing Australia's colonial history, specifically in regard to child removal.
- "Stolen generations (Australia)". Analysis & Policy Observatory. Archived from the original on 12 June 2017. Collection of articles and reports related to public policy and the Stolen Generations

=== News ===
- "The agony of Australia's Stolen Generation". BBC News. 9 August 2007.
- Bolt, Andrew (8 September 2006). "Robert Manne's list | Opinion". Herald Sun. Melbourne, Australia. Archived from the original on 19 May 2008.
- McMahon, Barbara (13 January 2008). "Australia's 'stolen' children get apology but no cash". The Guardian.
- Neubauer, Ian Lloyd (10 March 2014). "Australian Child Protection Accused of Repeating Sins of 'Stolen Generations'". Time. Archived from the original on 8 February 2022.
- Summers, Anne (12 January 2008). "A sorry way to right a terrible wrong | Opinion". The Sydney Morning Herald.
- "WA's Black Chapter". ABC Radio National. 23 June 1996. Archived from the original on 16 December 2008.

=== Other ===
- Rob Riley, CEO ALS 1990–1995 Telling Our Story ALSWA
- Home page of the Kimberley Stolen Generation Aboriginal Corporation
- Biographical Entry – The Australian Dictionary of Biography Online
- Sue Gordon becomes a force for her people
- Fremantle Arts Centre Press – My Place by Sally Morgan
- History News Network article on Rabbit Proof Fence and Sister Kates
- Genocide in Australia by Colin Tatz, AIATSIS Research Discussion Papers No 8
- Journey of Healing: Rabbit Proof Fence
