= Kanyini (film) =

- Directed by: Melanie Hogan
- Written by: Martin Lee; Bob Randall
- Produced by: Lynda House; Melanie Hogan; Bob Randall
- Starring: Bob Randall
- Narrated by: Bob Randall
- Cinematography: Denson Baker; Martin Lee
- Music by: David Page; Sam Petty; Manta
- Distributed by: Hopscotch Films
- Release date: 15 November 2006
- Running time: 53 minutes
- Country: Australia
- Language: English
- Box office: $52,450

Kanyini is a 2006 Australian documentary film, created by Uncle Bob Randall. Randall's dream was to create a film that supported his Kanyini teachings and he approached Melanie Hogan to produce it with him. Hogan directed, filmed and edited the film with the help of Martin Lee whose filming of Randall's interview made the core thread of the story.

The film explores the Kanyini philosophy and the life of Bob Randall, a Yankunytjatjara elder, songman and storyteller who lived in Mutitjulu, a small Aboriginal community next to Uluru, in Central Australia. Bob Randall was a 'Tjilpi' (special teaching uncle) of the Yankunytjatjara people and a member of the Stolen Generations.

== Overview ==
In Kanyini, Randall shares his knowledge of Anangu wisdom, stories of his personal journey and he explores some of the reasons behind the struggles of Aboriginal Australians in modern Australia. Randall explains that when European Australians came to Australia, they broke the four Kanyini Principles that were an integral part of Anangu life.

Randall states that:

- Tjuukurpa was broken when Europeans imposed their law on the Anangu,
- Ngura was broken when Aboriginal people were forced to move away from their traditional lands,
- Walytja was broken when the children of Randall's generation were removed from their family as part of the Stolen Generations
- Kurunpa was broken when Aboriginal spirituality was replaced with Christianity.

In explaining the loss of his Kurunpa, Randall notes the disconnect between the teachings of the Bible and the actions of the white men who professed them.

== Kanyini Principles ==
Kanyini is a Pitjantjatjara word meaning interconnectedness; caring, support, nurturing, and responsibility.

The four principles of Kanyini are:

=== Ngura ===
A sense of belonging to home and land.

=== Walytja ===
Family connecting with life.

=== Kurunpa ===
Love, spirit or soul.

=== Tjuukurpa ===
The belief about creation and the right way to live.

== Awards ==
Ceremony	Category	Result
Discovery Channel Awards	Best Documentary Independent Film	Won
National Film and Sound Archive Awards	Independent Spirit Independent Film	Won

== See also ==
- Kanyini
