= Gooniyandi language =

Aboriginal language of Western Australia

Gooniyandi
- Region: Western Australia
- Ethnicity: Gooniyandi
- Native speakers: 210 (2021 census)
- Language family: Bunuban: Gooniyandi
- Writing system: Latin

Language codes
- ISO 639-3: gni
- Glottolog: goon1238
- AIATSIS: K6
- ELP: Gooniyandi
- Glottopedia: Gooniyandi
- Gooniyandi is classified as Severely Endangered by the UNESCO Atlas of the World's Languages in Danger.

Gooniyandi is an Australian Aboriginal language now spoken by about 200 people, most of whom live in or near Fitzroy Crossing in Western Australia. Gooniyandi is an endangered language as it is not being passed on to children, who instead grow up speaking Kriol.

== Classification ==
Gooniyandi is closely related to Bunuba, to about the same degree as English is related to Dutch. The two are the only members of the Bunuban language family. Unlike the majority of Australian Aboriginal languages, Gooniyandi and Bunuba are non-Pama–Nyungan.

== Phonology ==
Gooniyandi has three vowel sounds: /a, i, u/. /a/ has contrastive vowel length.

Vowels
	Front	Back
High	i	u
Low	a	

Consonants
	Peripheral		Laminal		Apical	
	Labial	Velar	Palatal	Dental	Alveolar	Retroflex
Plosive	b	ɡ	ɟ ⟨j⟩	t̪ ⟨th⟩	d	ɖ ⟨rd⟩
Nasal	m	ŋ ⟨ng⟩	ɲ ⟨ny⟩	n̪ ⟨nh⟩	n	ɳ ⟨rn⟩
Tap					ɾ ⟨dd⟩	
Lateral			ʎ ⟨ly⟩		l	ɭ ⟨rl⟩
Approximant	w		j ⟨y⟩			ɻ ⟨r⟩

== Orthography ==
A Gooniyandi alphabet based on the Latin script was adopted by the community in 1984, and subsequently revised in 1990 and again in 1999. It is not phonemic, as it omits some distinctions made in speech.

== Grammar ==
Gooniyandi has no genders, but a large number of cases; it uses an ergative-absolutive case system. It is a verb-final language, but without a dominant order between the subject and the object.
