= Bob Randall (Aboriginal Australian elder) =

Aboriginal Australian elder, community leader, writer and musician

- Born: . Robert James Randall c.1934
- Died: 12 May 2015; Mutitjulu, Northern Territory, Australia
- Occupations: Aboriginal elder, singer, community leader
- Awards: 1999 NAIDOC Week Person of the Year

Robert James Randall (c.1934 – 12 May 2015), also known as Uncle Bob, was an Aboriginal Australian elder, singer and community leader. He was a member of the Stolen Generations and became an elder of the Yankunytjatjara people from Central Australia. He was the 1999 NAIDOC Person of the Year. He is known for his 1970 song, "My Brown Skin Baby (They Take 'Im Away)".

== Early life ==
Randall was born c. 1934 at Middleton Pond on Tempe Downs Station in the Central Desert region of the Northern Territory. His mother, Tanguawa, was a Yankunytjatjara domestic servant at the station. His father, William Liddle, was the White Australian owner of the station.

Around the age of seven, Randall was taken away from his mother and family under government policy which forcibly removed thousands of "half-caste" (part-Aboriginal) children from their families. This policy produced what came to be known as the "Stolen Generations". Randall was taken to The Bungalow, an institution for half-caste children in Alice Springs, Northern Territory, then later was moved to an Aboriginal reserve on Croker Island in Arnhem Land, thousands of kilometres away from his home and family. Randall was given a new identity and date of birth.

Randall spent his early years in government institutions until the age of twenty.

== Career ==
=== Community work ===
Randall moved to Darwin and later to Adelaide, South Australia, working, studying, establishing a career as an Aboriginal cultural educator, and looking for his family and country of belonging. He was affectionately known as "Uncle Bob" or "Tjilpi" (old man or uncle). He established Croker Island Night and several organisations in Darwin including the RRT Pony Club, Boxing Club, Folk Club, the Aboriginal Development Foundation. He worked as a counsellor through the Methodist Uniting Church.

He has taught his cultural awareness programs around the world, and written books about what he teaches. Much of it is based on the Aṉangu concept of Kanyini, which embodies the principles of "caring for the environment and each other with unconditional love and responsibility". He explains the Pitjantjatjara word as "best expressed in English as the combination of the two words 'responsibility' and 'love', but it is actually a relationship; it is an enormous caring with no limit – it has no timeframe: it is eternal... The interconnectedness of my belief system, my spirituality, my land, and my family... I've got to connect with each of these to be whole...".

In 1970, Randall helped establish the Adelaide Community College for Aboriginal people and lectured at the college on Aboriginal culture. He served as the director of the Northern Territory Legal Aid Service in Alice Springs.

He was a member of the committee of the Aboriginal Publications Foundation, which published the magazine Identity, in the 1970s.

He established Aboriginal and Torres Strait Islander Centres at Australian National University, University of Canberra, and University of Wollongong.

On 26 May 1998, Randall and his daughter Dorothea Randall performed at Parliament House, Canberra, as part of the first National Sorry Day commemoration.

In 2008, he served as one of three national patrons of the World Harmony Run, along with former athlete and then mayor of the Gold Coast, Ron Clarke, and former Governor-General Sir William Deane. As part of his role, he invited a small team of athletes to spend time with the Mutitjulu community, where he was living by then.

He was recognised as one of the traditional owners of Uluru.

=== Music ===
Randall led a country music band that serviced regional Aboriginal communities. In the early 1970s, Randall earned widespread recognition for his song, "My Brown Skin Baby, They Take 'Im Away," which garnered national and international attention on the issues of the Stolen Generation and opened the door for Indigenous story songwriters throughout Australia. It was first produced on vinyl in 1977, on The First Australians: Songs by Aboriginal and Torres Strait Islanders, an album featuring both traditional and contemporary Indigenous Australian music, produced by the Aboriginal Artists Agency. The song was later described as "the first anthem" for the Stolen Generations.

In 2013, he appeared and performed in Mbantua Festival's outdoor performance, Bungalow Song, referring to The Bungalow, a former institution for Aboriginal children (see #Early life).

== Film and TV ==
In March 1970, "Brown Skin Baby" was featured in an episode of ABC Television's documentary series Chequerboard. The episode, entitled "My Brown Skin Baby, They Take 'im Away" was the first exposure of the practice of taking Aboriginal children from their families in Australian media. The documentary is 52 minutes long and clips are available on the National Film and Sound Archive website.

Randall appeared in the documentary films Mixed Up Man and Secret Country by John Pilger, had roles in the movies Picnic at Hanging Rock and The Last Wave.

In 2006, Randall co-produced and narrated the documentary Kanyini with Melanie Hogan. It was voted "best documentary" at the London Australian Film Festival 2007, winner of the Inside Film Independent Spirit Award, and winner of the Discovery Channel "Best Documentary Award" in 2006.

In 2014 he appeared in John Pilger's film, Utopia and released two documentary films with Andrew Harvey, Songman and Living Kanyini.

== Recognition ==
Randall was the 1999 NAIDOC Person of the Year, recognised for his lifelong efforts to retain Aboriginal culture and restore equal rights for all living people.

In 2004, he was inducted into the NT Indigenous Music Hall of Fame, recognising the historical significance of his classic story songs.

He was known by the honorific "Tjilpi", a word meaning "old man" that is often translated as "uncle" – "Uncle Bob".

== Later life, death and legacy ==
He returned to his mother's country (his Ngura), Mutitjulu, after many years of living in other places, and is a recognised traditional owner of Uluru.

His story was recorded in 2002 by the National Library of Australia for the Bringing Them Home oral history project. It also appeared in the associated publication Many Voices: Reflections on Experiences of Indigenous Child Separation.

In 2011, he was interviewed by John Bannister as part of the Bringing Them Home after the Apology oral history project.

Randall died in Mutitjulu on 12 May 2015, aged approximately 81.

== Discography ==
=== Albums ===
- Ballads by Bob Randall (1983) – CAAMA
- Bob Randall (1984) – Imparja

=== Compilations ===
- Desert Songs 1 (1982) – CAAMA
- First Australians: Songs by Aboriginals and Torres Strait Islanders (1978) – Aboriginal Artists Agency
- Rebel Voices From Black Australia (1990) – Imparja
- Ted Egan Presents the Aboriginals (1987) – EMI

== Books ==
Randall authored four books, including his autobiography, Songman, and three books for children: Tracker Tjuginji, Stories From Country, and Nyuntu Ninti.

He contributed his personal story of being stolen to the anthology, Stories of Belonging: Finding Where Your True Self Lives, edited by Kelly Wendorf, published in 2009.

- Randall, Bob (2003). Songman: the story of an Aboriginal elder of Uluru. ABC Books for the Australian Broadcasting Corporation. ISBN 0-7333-1262-4.
- Randall, Bob; Kunyi June-Anne McInerney (2003). Tracker Tjugingji. IAD Press. ISBN 1-86465-030-3.
- Randall, Bob; Susan Haworth (2007). Stories from country: my pony Hooky and other tales. ABC Books for the Australian Broadcasting Corporation. ISBN 978-0-7333-2047-7.
- Randall, Bob; Melanie Hogan (2008). Nyuntu ninti: (what you should know). ABC Books. ISBN 978-0-7333-2049-1.
