= Bunuba language =

Aboriginal language of Australia

Bunuba
- Bunaba, Bunapa, Punuba, Punapa, Punaba, Buniba
- Native to: Western Australia
- Region: Kimberley (Western Australia)
- Ethnicity: Bunuba
- Native speakers: 150 (2021 census)
- Language family: Bunuban: Bunuba

Language codes
- ISO 639-3: bck
- Glottolog: buna1275
- AIATSIS: K5
- ELP: Bunuba
- Bunuba is classified as Severely Endangered by the UNESCO Atlas of the World's Languages in Danger.

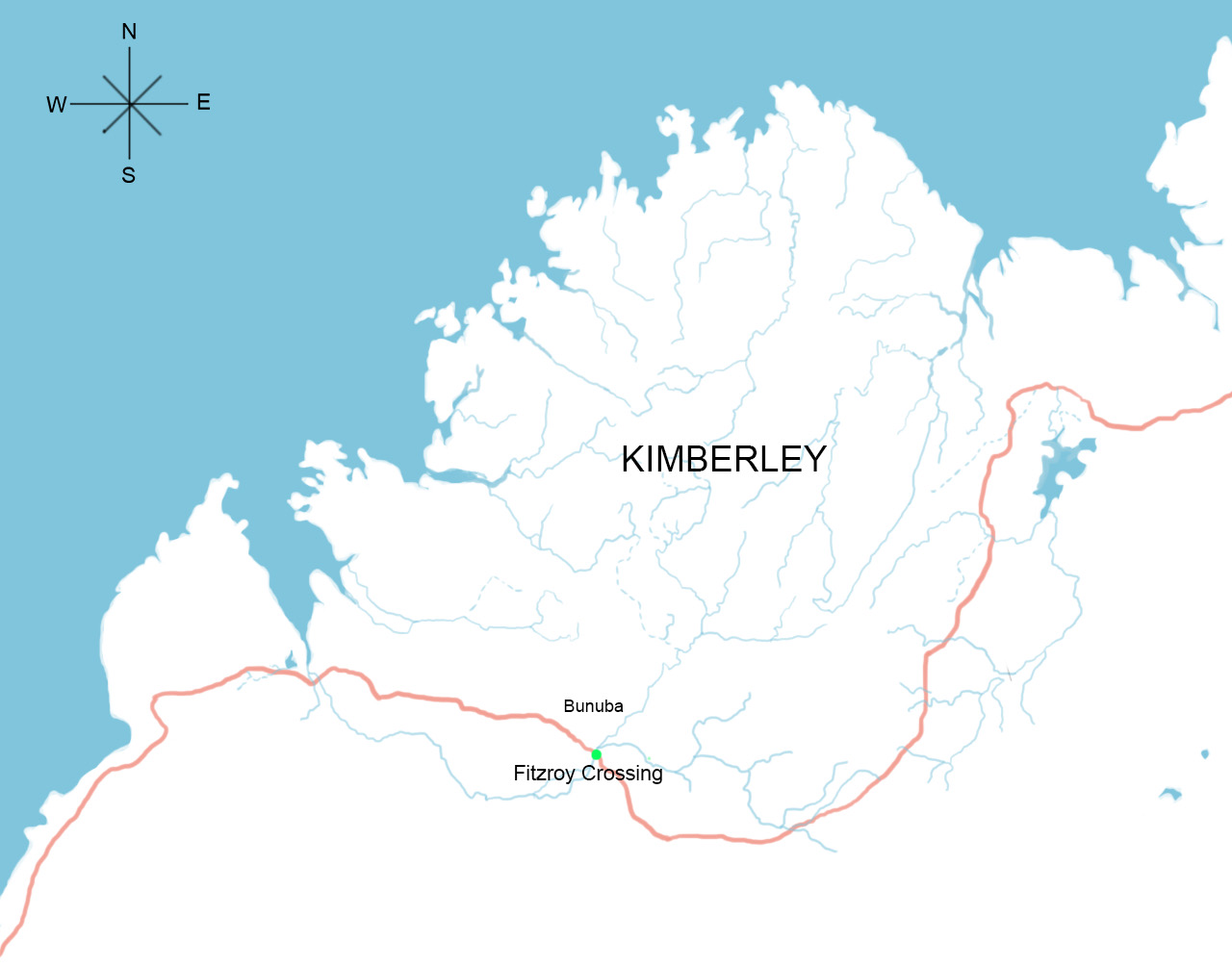
- Bunuba Country near Fitzroy Crossing, Kimberley Region of Western Australia

Bunuba (Bunaba, Bunapa, Punuba, Punapa, Punaba, Buniba) is an Australian Aboriginal language spoken by some 41 older Bunuba adults, most of whom live in Junjuwa, an Aboriginal community in Fitzroy Crossing in Western Australia. Bunuba is not related to the Pama-Nyungan language family that spans the majority of Australia; however, it is a relative of Guniyandi. Both are subgroups of the Bunuban language family. Bunuba consists of two dialects, 'light' and 'heavy' Bunuba.

Due to the growing concern of their language becoming extinct, the elders to maintain the use of Bunuba by passing on stories to younger community members around campfires at night. This is a way for Bunuba elders to prevent the extinction of their language, by passing it down through generations. Language maintenance and revival has increased during the later decades of the 20th century and the early 21st century due to the growing documentation of Bunuba language, and the production of resources that have been written and used by Bunuba community members.

== History of research on Bunuba ==
=== Early phase (late 19th century – 1929) ===
The first distinctions made between the Australian Aboriginal languages of the north and south of Australia were by Wilhelm Schmidt (linguist) in 1919. These language groups later became known as Pama–Nyungan (the Southern languages) and Non-Pama-Nyungan (the Northern Languages).

=== Intermediate phase (1930–1959) ===
From 1938 to 1989 Australian linguist, Arthur Capell visited the Northern Territory to record features of Kimberley Languages including Bunuba. Capell's studies were published in 1940 in the journal article The Classification of Languages in North and North-West Australia. His written work is now located at Canberra's Australian Institute of Aboriginal and Torres Strait Islander Studies. A New Approach to Australian Linguistics published by Capell in 1956 details the classifications and typologies of Australian Aboriginal languages, including those of the Kimberley (Western Australia).

=== Modern phase (1960 – present) ===
The modern phase of Australian Aboriginal Language research employs a descriptive approach that is grammar-oriented. Howard Coate documented Bunuba in the mid-1960s, applying new approaches and modern linguistic research methods to his contributions. In particular, he produced audio recordings of Bunuba dialogue which is also now located at the Australian Institute of Aboriginal and Torres Strait Islander Studies. Australian linguist Alan Rumsey has extensively contributed to detailed linguistic coverage of Bunuba from the 1970s until the 1990s whilst working with the local Bunuba community. Rumsey has focused on syntax and producing a Bunuba grammar; notably phonology, morphology, and the person/number system.

== Classification ==
Bunuba is a Non-Pama-Nyungan language and a subgroup of the Bunuban family languages. It is not related to the Pama–Nyungan languages that span the majority of Australia.

=== Arthur Capell's classification ===
Capell classified Bunuba as a non-classifying language of the Fitzroy basin region, alongside Guniyandi. Bunuba is non-classifying in that it does not rely on the use of noun classes nor grammatical gender. For example, Bunuba does not have gendered pronouns, rather it uses a singular 'they' pronoun niyiŋga for third-person singular 'he', 'she', and 'it'.

== Related languages ==
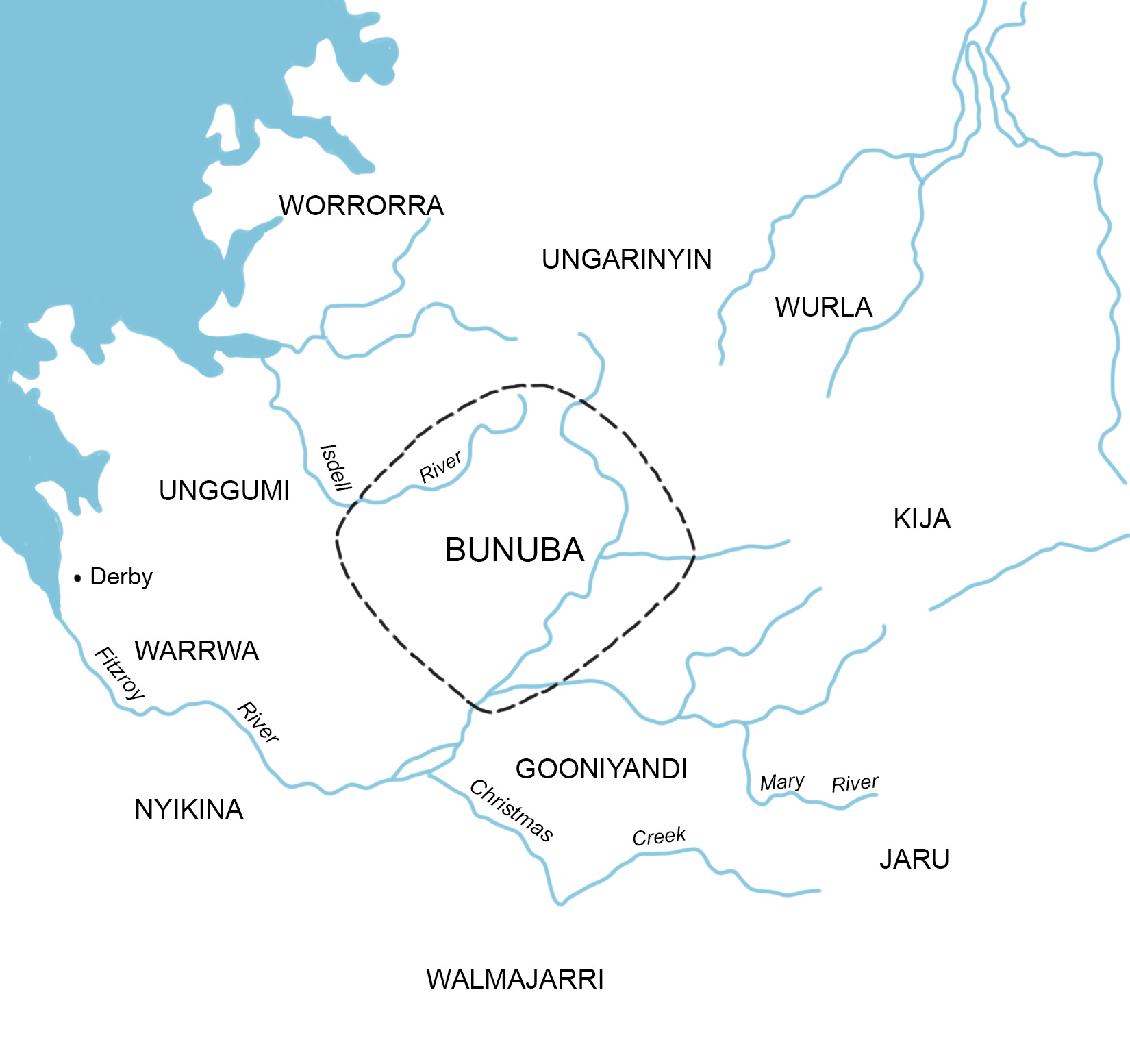

Bunuba Country is surrounded by other Non-Pama-Nyungan speaking regions of Guniyandi, Gija, Ngarinyin, Nyigina, Unggumi, and Warrwa. Their similarity to Bunuba was determined by comparing how many words each languages shared with Kenneth L. Hale's list of 100 foundational words of Northern Paman languages.

Similarities between Bunuba and other non-Pama-Nyungan languages
Non-Pama-Nyungan Language	Percentage of Similarity
Guniyandi	45%
Ungarinyin	24%
Walmajarri	24%
Kija	20%
Unggumi	20%
Nyikina	15%
Warrwa	11%

=== Relationship to Guniyandi ===
Although Guniyandi is the most similar language to Bunuba based on linguistic typology, they are not mutually intelligible, rather they are subgroups of the overarching Bunuban family language group. Based on Hale's list of 100 foundational words, approximately 45% of Bunuba vocabulary is shared with Guniyandi; this percentage determines their relationship as subgroups of the larger language group.

== Dialect variation ==
There are two regional Bunuba dialects which are distinguished based on where they are geographically spoken within Bunuba Country. In the eastern and southern regions of Bunuba Country, a 'light' Bunuba dialect if spoken. In the northern and western regions a 'heavy' dialect is used, which is also known as Unggumi Bunuba in reference to the similarities that it shares with Unggumi language spoken by the Unggumi peoples in the region north-west of Bunuba Country.

The main contrast between light and heavy Bunuba dialects is based on the phonological differences that are characteristic of Unggumi. For example, the light Bunuba dialect utilises a /y/ phoneme in place of /yh/ which is more common in the heavy dialect. This variation is present in dialectal differences between the words for 'meat' with light dialect speakers utilising /miya/ and heavy dialect speakers adhering to the older pronunciation of /miyha/. The use of /y/ and /yh/ causes /miya/ and /miyha/ to become a minimal pair. Generally, Bunuba dialectal differences do not present problems in understanding between speakers of each dialect.

== Phonology ==
IPA broad transcription is in /slashes/, and orthography spelling in ⟨brackets⟩.

=== Consonants ===
Consonants
	Peripheral		Laminal		Apical	
	Labial	Velar	Palatal	Dental	Alveolar	Retroflex
Plosive	/b/ ⟨b⟩	/g/ ⟨g⟩	/ɟ/ ⟨j⟩	/t̪/ ⟨th⟩	/d/ ⟨d⟩	/ɖ/ ⟨rd⟩
Nasal	/m/ ⟨m⟩	/ŋ/ ⟨ng⟩	/ɲ/ ⟨ny⟩	/n̪/ ⟨nh⟩	/n/ ⟨n⟩	/ɳ/ ⟨rn⟩
Rhotic					/r/ ⟨rr⟩	/ɻ/ ⟨r⟩
Lateral			/ʎ/ ⟨ly⟩		/l/ ⟨l⟩	/ɭ/ ⟨rl⟩
Approximant	/w/ ⟨w⟩		/j/ ⟨y⟩	/ɹ̪/ ⟨yh⟩		

==== Stops and nasals ====
Bunuba, like some of its neighbouring Kimberley languages, has six articulation points that determine the articulatory differences between stops and nasals. These are bilabial articulation, velar articulation, dental articulation, palatal articulation, alveolar articulation, and retroflex articulation. These are grouped together into more general places of articulation based on tongue placement. Bilabial and velar articulations are grouped together as peripherals because their pronunciation requires articulation at the front and back peripheries of the mouth. Dental and palatal articulations are groups under laminals as they utilise the larger central body of the tongue during pronunciation. Alveolar and retroflex are grouped as apicals because they use the tongue tip.

	Generalised place of articulation					
	Peripheral		Laminal		Apical	
Place of articulation	bilabial	velar	dental	palatal	alveolar	retroflex

Word initial stops are either voiced or non-aspirated and voiceless. They are also fully voiced when they occur in any other place in a word. In words that are expressively or emotionally emphasised, the stop can become aspirated. For example, when a mother firmly addresses her son with 'son' [‘cʰukʰu].

==== Laterals ====
Bunuba utilises three laterals that are common to almost all Kimberley languages: ⟨l⟩, ⟨rl⟩, and ⟨ly⟩. For all three, the tip of the tongue touches the roof of the mouth. The distinguishing articulatory factor is the larger central body of the tongue, which is situated low for ⟨rl⟩, central for ⟨l⟩ and high for ⟨ly⟩.(rum) [ɭ] ⟨rl⟩ is depicted as ⟨l⟩ in Bunuba orthography.

Examples of lateral contrasts:

- balarra 'outside'
- walarri 'ghost gum, snappy gum'
- walyarra 'sand'

==== Rhotics ====
Bunuba has two rhotic sounds.

1. ⟨rr⟩ [r] the alveolar tap, similar to the trill present in Scottish English.
2. ⟨r⟩ [ɻ] the retroflex continuant which is akin to other English dialects which utilise a continuant r-sound. The tongue does not touch the roof of the mouth.

==== Glides ====
The Bunuba [w] and [j] are akin to English pronunciations of ⟨w⟩ and ⟨y⟩ respectively. The pronunciation of the dental glide ⟨yh⟩ requires a lateral spreading of the tongue, with an articulatory point similar to those of ⟨nh⟩ and ⟨th⟩. This glide is unique to Bunuba and the neighbouring language of Unggumi. It is also the distinguishing factor between light and heavy Bunuba dialects.

=== Vowels ===
Bunuba has only three basic vowel phonemes: /i, a, u/.

/a/ is the only vowel demonstrating contrastive vowel length.

Vowels
		Front	Central	Back
High		/i/ ⟨i⟩		/u/ ⟨u⟩
Low	short		/a/ ⟨a⟩	
Low	long		/aː/ ⟨aa⟩	

== Grammar ==
=== Parts of Speech ===
==== Nominals ====
Nominals in Bunuba are free lexemes which morphemes can be added to. This is central to its distinction as a polysynthetic language.

Verbal words

Bunuba verbs contain affixes; a preverb, and an auxiliary. Depending on the verb, the two affixes can take on individual word meanings, or add meaning to the root verb.

Adverbs

Bunuba adverbs are not the same as aforementioned verbal words, as they are standalone words which affixes cannot be added on to.

Pronouns

Pronouns contain numeric distinctions in the root of the word.

Kin terms

Bunuba kin terms are vocative, take on possessive inflections, and possess a number system.

=== Reduplication ===
Bunuba utilises reduplication to indicate plurality. Bunuba uses both partial and total reduplication. Partial reduplication requires a repetition of only a certain part of the root word, whilst total reduplication uses a repetition of the whole root word.

For example:

- In reference to a group of children: ma-mabilyi 'little ones' stemming from mabilyi 'little'
- In reference to the husbands of multiple women: nhungu-nhungu-way 'their husbands' stemming from nhungu-way 'her husband'

Reduplication is also used in Bunuba to intensify words.

For example:

- gililandirri 'very big' stemming from gilandirri 'big'

== Typology ==
=== Morphological typology ===
Bunuba is a polysynthetic language; words consist of multiple morphemes, which can also have meanings independent of their position in a polysynthetic word.

== Documentation and revival ==
=== Kimberley Language Resource Centre ===
The Kimberley Language Resource Centre (KLRC) was established in 1984 with the role of revitalising, maintaining, and promoting Australian Aboriginal languages.

==== Community engagement ====
A main aim of KLRC is to assist with career opportunities that cater to the cross-cultural and language needs of Kimberley language groups. This is done by providing training for community members of language groups in order to increase chances of employment in sectors that can cater to their linguistic needs.

==== Bunuba orthography ====
Prior to 1989, linguistic research on Bunuba has not followed a specific orthography, leading to possible discrepancies between lexical items. To improve linguistic clarity, KLRC assisted approximately twenty local Bunuba speakers in producing an orthography for the language in 1989. The orthography was then utilised in 1991 to create an illustrated Bunuba wordbook that continues to be used in the teaching and learning of the language.

==== Written, audio, and video documentation ====
KLRC owns archives of linguistic material from the 1950s until present, that have been provided by Australian linguists and language workers who have researched Aboriginal languages of the Kimberley Region. Apart from storing archival material at the resource centre, KLRC works alongside the Australian Institute of Aboriginal and Torres Strait Islander Studies (AIATSIS) to return language resources back to Indigenous communities. Resources include documentation from Howard Coate's research on Bunuban languages. To increase the revitalisation and maintenance of Bunuba, KLRC owns archival documents of the language in audio, video, and book formats.

===== Thangani Bunuba (Bunuba Stories) =====
Thangani Bunuba is a collection of stories told by twelve Bunuba elders from the Fitzroy River region. The creation of this book was a project that aimed to revive and maintain the Bunuba language and was undertaken at the request of the Bunuba elders who sought after a way for the language to be preserved. The elders worked alongside linguists and language workers from the KLRC in order to translate the stories into English.

Stories were shared by the elders alongside the traditional paintings that are featured in the book. The process of creating this book required audio recordings of each story to be produced, which were able to be transcribed and later translated into English by Bunuba speakers and linguists. The book also contains a 'Guide to Bunuba Pronunciation' which consists of an orthography of Bunuba with a phonetic assistance based on English pronunciation of the same vowels and consonants.

== Bunuba in theatre ==
=== The Story of Jandamarra ===
Jandamarra was an Aboriginal Australian man and a leader of the Bunuba people throughout the late 1800s. Due to his proficiency in English he had a range of occupations including working for local police by looking after their horses. Jandamarra became a stockman at Lillimooloora station, and was later employed as an Aboriginal tracker to assist in capturing Bunuba people. He is mostly known for his role in organising and leading resistance against European settlers in the southern areas of the Kimberley Region. Jandamarra's biography has been reproduced in different entertainment media formats, such as the 2008 stage play Jandamarra by Bunuba Films which included dialogue in Bunuba language.

==== Jandamarra (stage play) ====
The production of the 2008 stage play was based on the 1995 historical book Jandamarra and the Bunuba Resistance written in collaboration between historian Howard Pedersen and Bunuba elder Banjo Woorunmurra, of whom the story of Jandamarra was under senior custodianship. The story of Jandamarra was adapted into the stage play Jandamarra which was produced by the Bunuba run company, Bunuba Films in co-production with the Black Swan State Theatre Company. The stage play went on tour as The Jandamarra Returns Tour (2011) which ran from July to August, with thirteen performances altogether. Tour locations included Broome, Kununurra, Lundja Community of Halls Creek, and Windjana Gorge, amassing 5,097 total audience members.

To immerse audiences into the Bunuban storyline, a conscious decision was made by playwright, Steve Hawke to use Bunuba language and Kimberley Kriol for scenes that were situated in the Bunuban environment. Linguists and language coaches were appointed during workshops arranged by the collaborating Bunuba Films and the Black Swan State Theatre company, between March and April 2007. Bunuba language was integrated into the script through the work of four Bunuba women of linguistic and community leadership backgrounds: Mona Oscar, Patsy Bedford, June Oscar, and Selina Middleton. They worked as translators to provide the back translations for surtitles. The script was translated from English into Bunuba, then translated back into English by the group of translators who ensured the maintenance of cultural salience. The back translations were then projected onto a screen as surtitles for audiences to understand the scenes which depicted Bunuba language, culture, and country. Bunuba elders taught the language to the actors, with lead actor, Damion Hunter undergoing Bunuba language coaching during the production phase in order to depict the main role of Jandamarra. The use of Bunuba language included the performance of Yilimbirri Junba, a traditional song and dance carried out by Bunuba singers, dancers, and lawmen.
