= Bunuban languages =

Australian Aboriginal language family

Bunuban
- Geographic distribution: around Fitzroy Crossing, Kimberley region
- Linguistic classification: One of the world's primary language families
- Subdivisions: Bunuba; Gooniyandi

Language codes
- Glottolog: buna1274
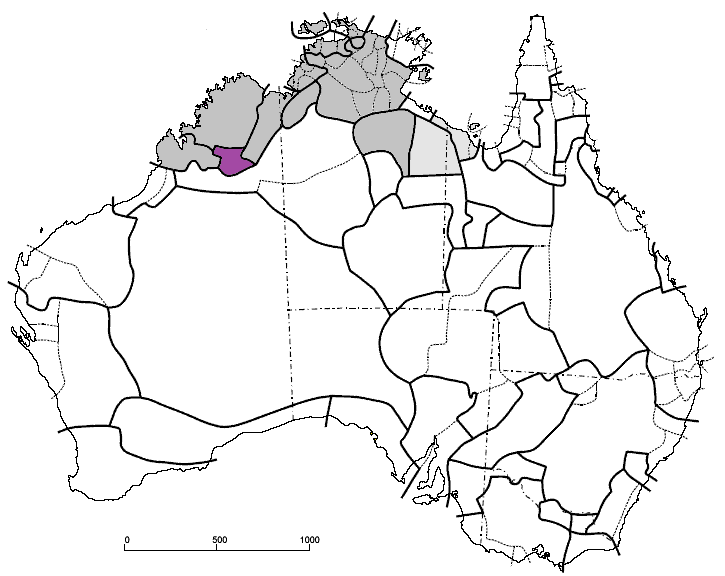
- Bunuban languages (purple), among other non-Pama-Nyungan languages (grey)

The Bunuban languages (or Bunaban) are a small family of Australian Aboriginal languages spoken in northern Australia. The family consists of two languages, Bunuba and Gooniyandi, which are related to each other to about the same degree that English is related to Dutch. Bunuba has about 100 speakers and Gooniyandi about 200. Both are endangered.

== Vocabulary ==
Capell (1940) lists the following basic vocabulary items:

English	Bunaba	Gunian
man	gujɽäma	juwulu
woman	wiːji	maŋo
head	guŋgulu	walu
eye	mulu	mɔːlu
nose	wuɽa	manili
mouth	djäläṉ	daŋandi
tongue	djälän	djäläṉ
stomach	giniŋa	djulu
bone	gudju	gudji
blood	gili	wari
kangaroo	wandjiri	wandjiri
opossum	läŋgur	djämbidjin
emu	ganaŋandja	
crow	waŋgaɳa	waŋgide
fly	ŋirinji	ŋurinj
sun	gawara	miri
moon	gilimana	djaːlin
fire	windäli	weandi
smoke	bindja	wangi
water	gaɽwa	gaːmba
