= Noni (disambiguation) =

Noni, or Morinda citrifolia, is a tree in the family Rubiaceae, or its fruit.

Noni may also refer to:

- Noone language, also called Noni or Nooni, a Bantu language
- Noni the Pony (2010), children's picture book
  - Noni the Pony Goes to the Beach (2014)
  - Noni the Pony Rescues a Joey (2018)

== People ==
- Alda Noni (1916–2011), Italian soprano leggiero
- Anika Noni Rose (born 1972), African-American singer and actress
- Noni Bhoumik (1921–1996), Bengali writer and translator
- Nonie Buencamino (born 1966), Filipino actor
- Noni Carter (born 1991), American author
- Noni Răzvan Ene (born 1992), Romanian singer
- Noni Hazlehurst (born 1953), Australian actress
- Noni Ioannidou (born 1958), Greek theatre and stage actress and model
- Noni Jabavu (1919–2008), South African writer and journalist
- Noni Lichtveld (1929–2017), Dutch-Surinamese author and illustrator
- Noni Lima (born 1957), Cabo Verdean football manager
- Noni MacDonald, Canadian physician
- Noni Madueke (born 2002), English footballer
- Noni Olabisi (1954–2022), African-American painter and muralist
- Noni Salma, Nigerian transgender film-maker and screenwriter
- Noni Wharemate (born 1982), New Zealand basketball player
- Noni White, American screenwriter and actress

== See also ==
- Nonny
- Nonnie
