= Tourist Drives in Western Australia =

Routes through areas of scenic or historic significance in Western Australia

Tourist Drives of Western Australia
- Route markers for Tourist Drives 200, 250, & 350

System information
- Length: 2,000 km approx. (1,200 mi)
- Formed: c. 1990s

Highway names
- Within Perth: Tourist Drives 200–207
- Elsewhere: Tourist Drives 250–260 & 350–360

Tourist Drives in Western Australia are routes through areas of scenic or historic significance, designated by route markers with white numbers on a brown shield. Tourist Drives were introduced into Western Australia while Eric Charlton was the state government Minister for Transport in the 1990s. The 28 numbered routes collectively traverse more than 2,000 kilometres (1,200 mi) across the state. In addition to the Tourist Drives, there are unnumbered routes such as the Golden Pipeline Heritage Trail, and local governments may designate and maintain local scenic drives, generally unnamed and unnumbered.

== Tourist Drive 200 ==
Tourist Drive 200 Kings Park Tourist Drive
- Location: Kings Park
- Length: 7 km (4.3 mi)
- Route number: 200

Kings Park Tourist Drive, designated as Tourist Drive 200, is a scenic route through Kings Park in the centre of Perth, Western Australia. The 7-kilometre-long (4.3 mi) drive begins with Fraser Avenue, the northern entry to the park. Lemon-scented Gums, planted in 1938, line the entrance road, which proceeds southwards to the State War Memorial. The memorial honours the servicemen and women who have died in wars since the Boer War, while the nearby lookout provides vistas of the Perth's city centre and adjacent Swan River, with the hills of the Darling Scarp in the background. The tourist drive continues in a loop inside Kings Park, with Forrest Drive, Lovekin Drive, and May Drive taking visitors to the Botanical Gardens, Synergy Parkland, children's playgrounds, and through native bushland, finishing back at the State War Memorial precinct. Vehicles can also be access the drive from Park Avenue and Poole Avenue at the southern end, and Saw Avenue at the western edge, and there are many paths and walkways crossing the park.

Views along Kings Park Tourist Drive

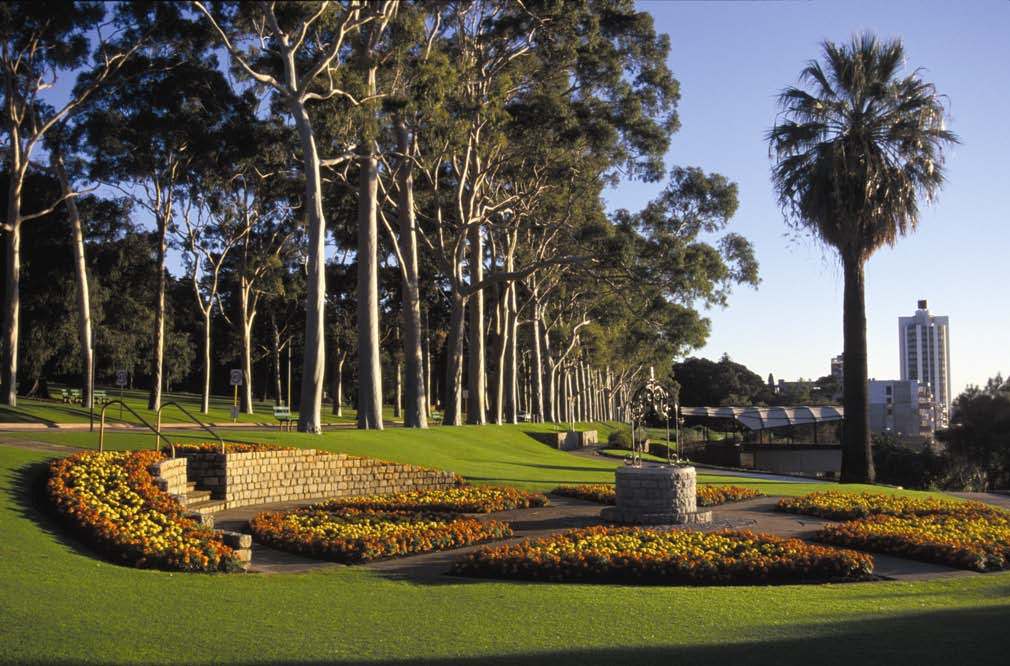
Fraser Avenue precinct

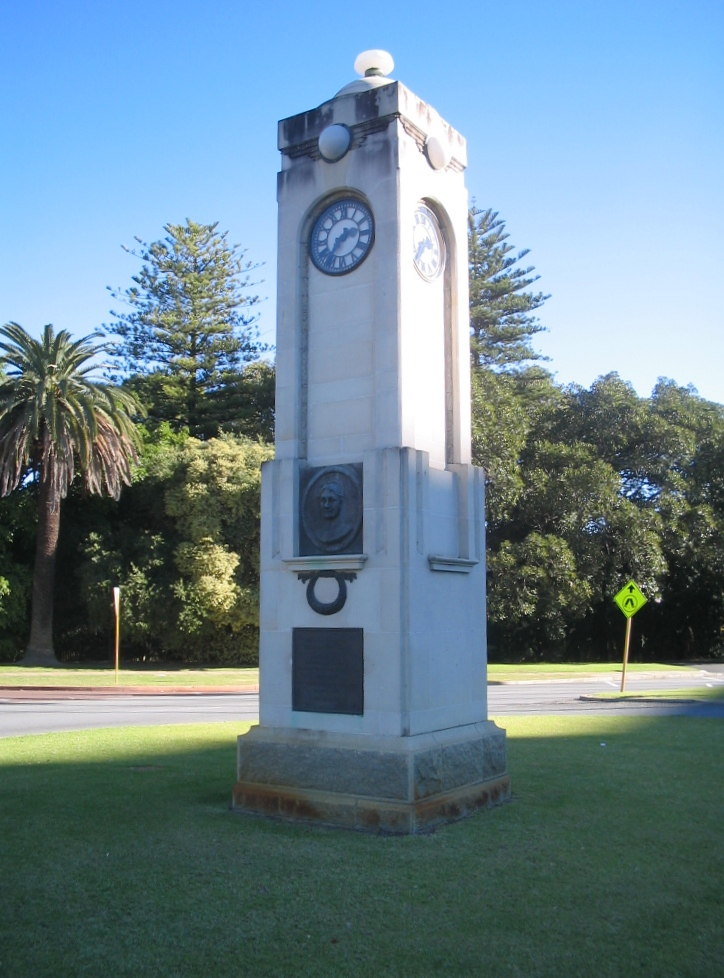
Edith Cowan Memorial at park entrance

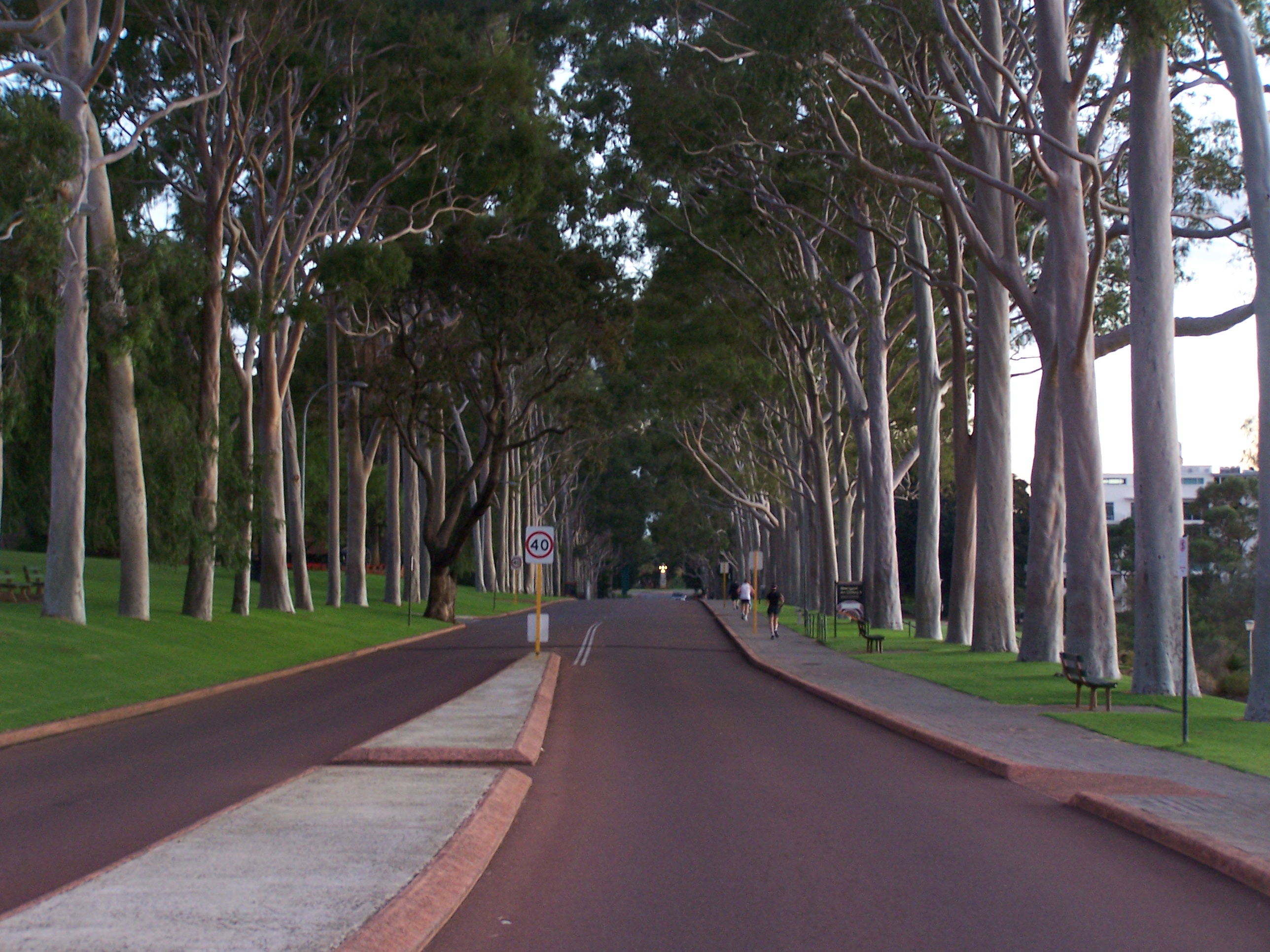
Lemon-scented Gums on Fraser Avenue

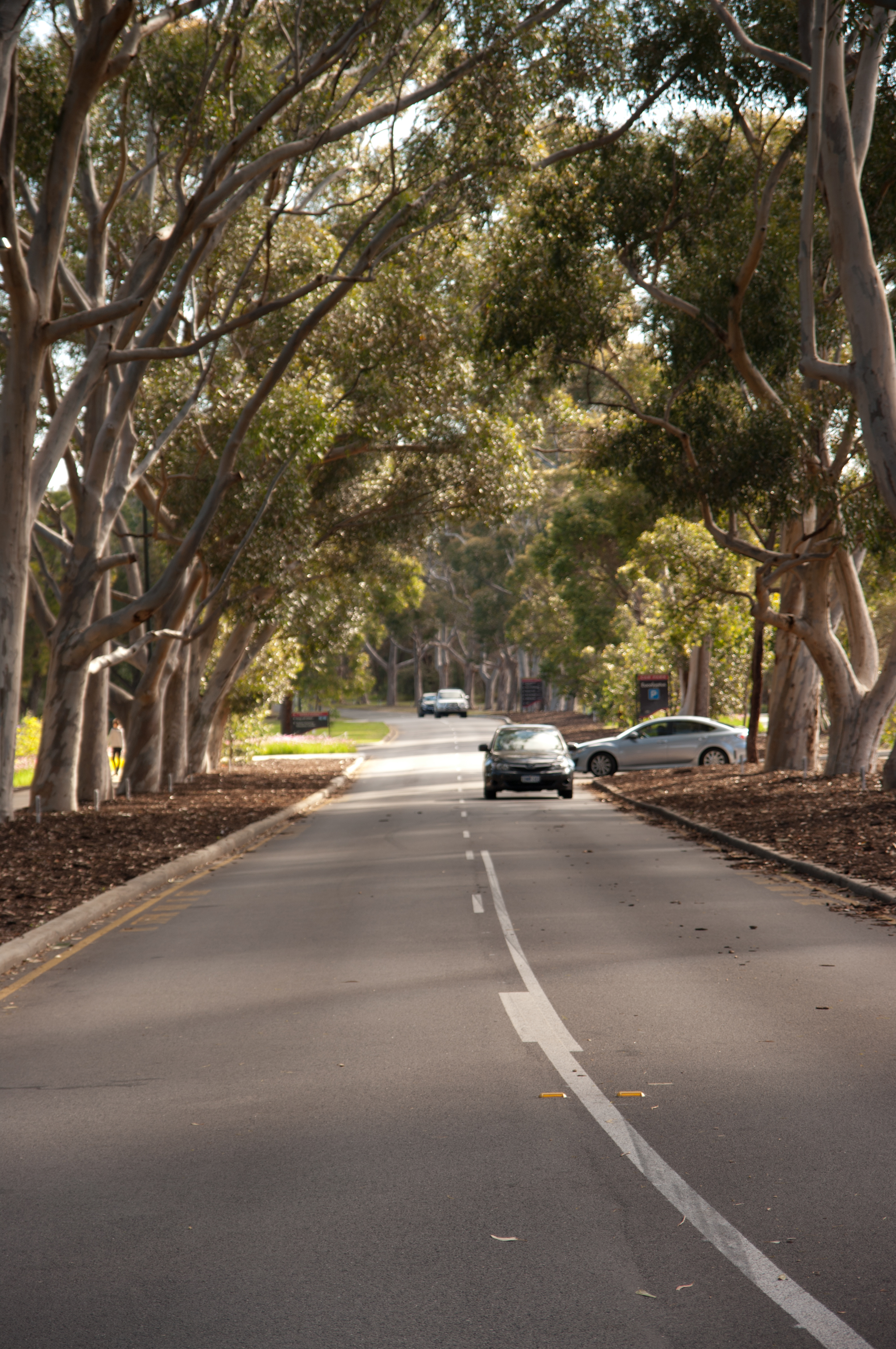
Lovekin Drive (near Botanical Gardens)

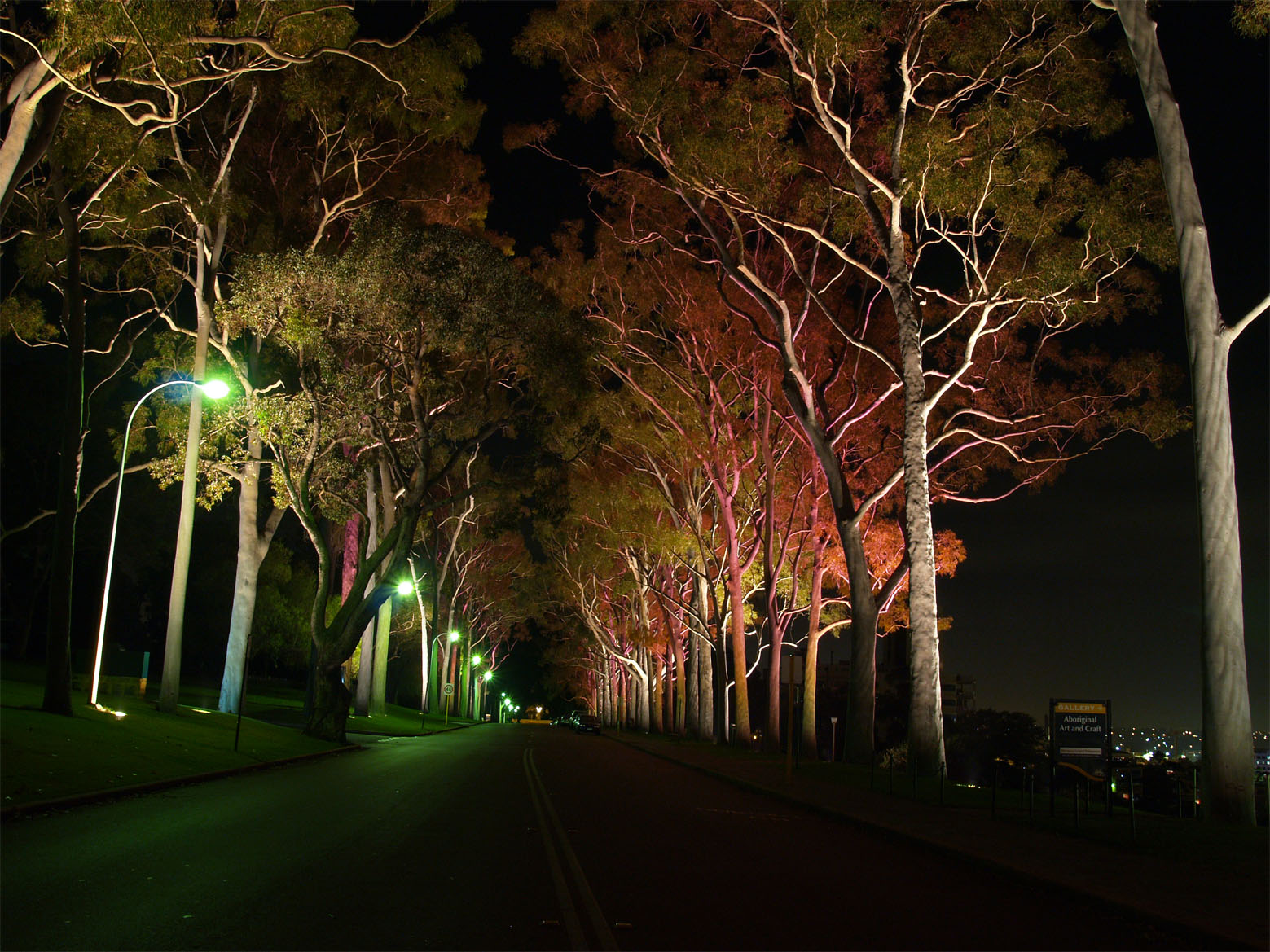
Fraser Avenue at night

== Tourist Drive 201 ==
Tourist Drive 201 John Forrest Tourist Drive
- Location: John Forrest National Park
- Length: 10 km (6.2 mi)
- Route number: 201

John Forrest Tourist Drive, designated as Tourist Drive 201, is a scenic route through John Forrest National Park in the eastern hills of Perth, Western Australia. The 10-kilometre-long (6.2 mi) drive travels around the national park along Park Road, and can be accessed from the park entrances on Great Eastern Highway. In addition to the natural fauna and flora of the park, the tourist drive provides access to a scenic lookout over Perth and the edge of the Darling Scarp, Glen Brook Dam, which is the site of a picnic area and starting point for many walking trails, as well as the park's visitors area, where facilities, cultivated gardens, and a swimming hole are located. The 1,580 hectares (3,900 acres) of land in John Forrest National Park is almost entirely undeveloped, with the tourist drive itself restricted to the southern section of the park, south of Jane Brook.

Park entry fees apply, unless visitors walk or cycle into the park.

Entrance to John Forrest Tourist Drive at Great Eastern Highway across from Bilgoman Pool

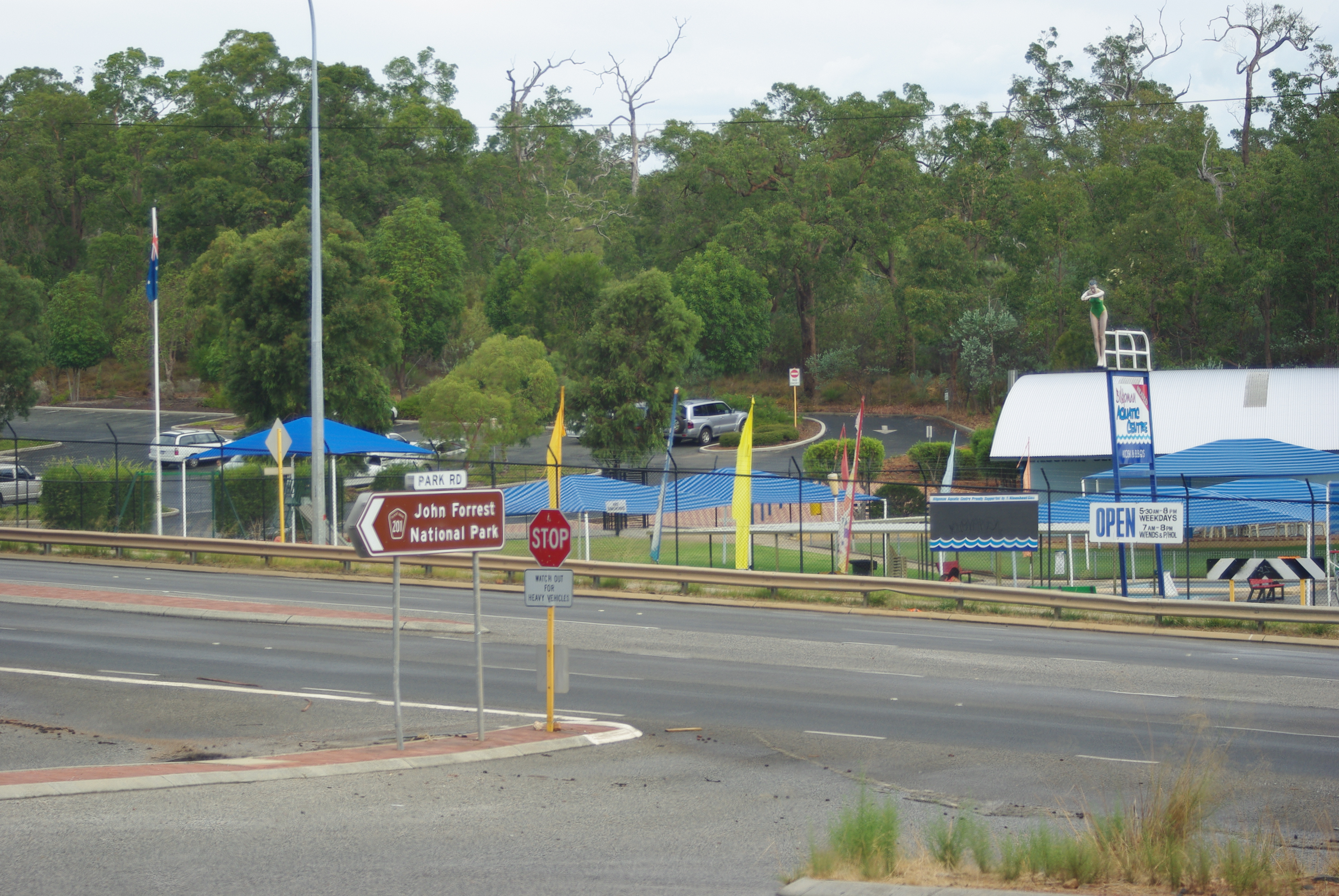
Start of tourist drive

== Tourist Drive 202 ==
Tourist Drive 202 Rockingham Coastal Tourist Drive
- Location: Rockingham
- Length: 24 km (15 mi)
- Route number: 202

Rockingham Coastal Tourist Drive, designated as Tourist Drive 202, is a scenic route around the Rockingham coast. The route travels along Kwinana Beach Road, Rockingham Beach Road, Harrison Street, Val Street, The Esplanade, Hymus Street, Point Peron Road, Memorial Drive, Lease Road, Arcadia Drive, and Safety Bay Road. Starting at Kwinana Beach, the tourist drive travels via Point Peron and Safety Bay to Warnbro.

Views along Rockingham Coastal Tourist Drive

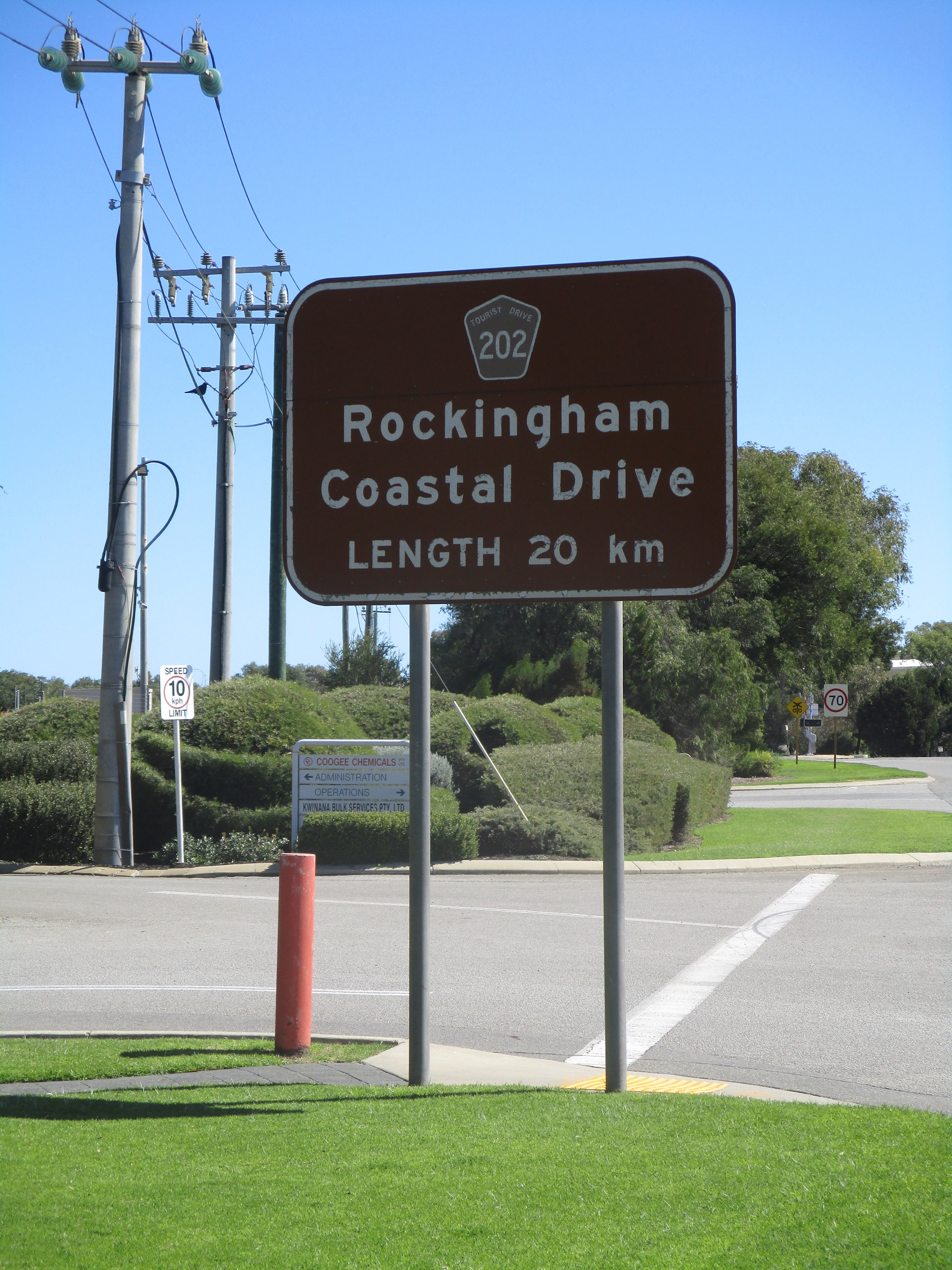
Rockingham Coastal Drive sign at the northern end, at the start of Kwinana Beach Road

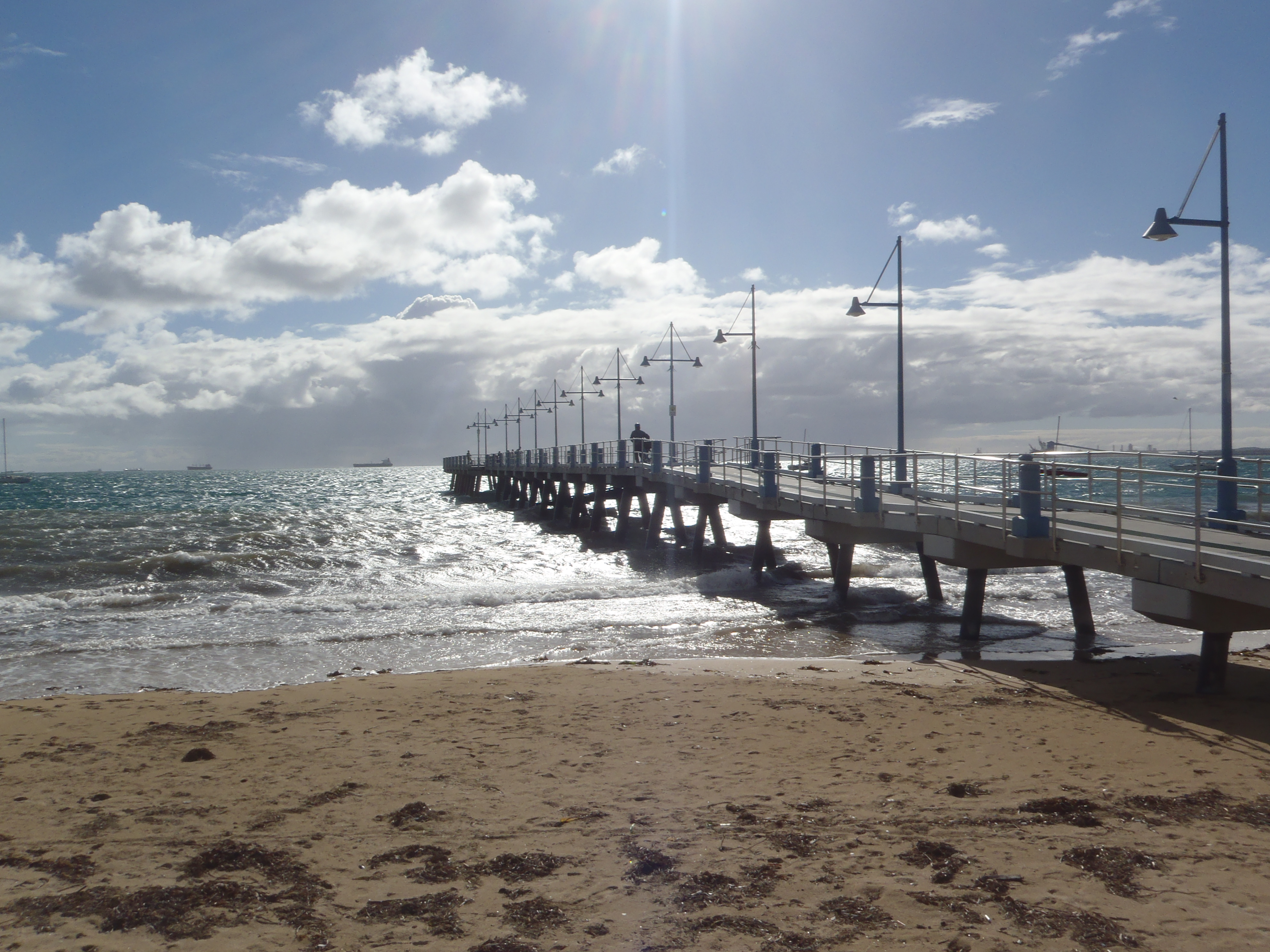
Palm Beach Jetty and Mangles Bay

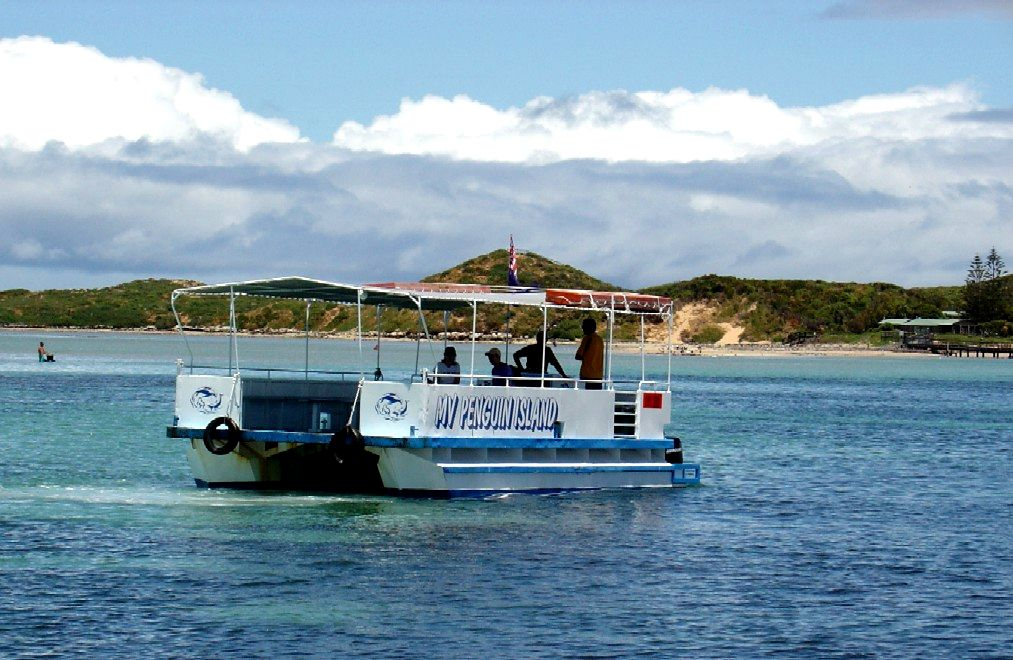
Penguin Island Ferry

== Tourist Drive 203 ==
Tourist Drive 203 Swan Valley Tourist Drive
- Location: Swan Valley
- Length: 31 km (19 mi)
- Route number: 203

Swan Valley Tourist Drive, designated as Tourist Drive 203, is a tourist drive through Perth's Swan Valley. The 31-kilometre-long (19 mi) route is a loop from Guildford to West Swan, Belhus, and Midland, and then back to Guildford. The tourist drive travels via Meadow Street, West Swan Road, Great Northern Highway, Morrison Road, Great Eastern Highway, Terrace Road, and Swan Street.

== Tourist Drive 204 ==
Tourist Drive 204 Sunset Coast Tourist Drive
- Location: North Fremantle – Ocean Reef
- Length: 38 km (24 mi)
- Route number: 204

West Coast Drive from Hillarys to Trigg Beach

Sunset Coast Tourist Drive, designated as Tourist Drive 204, is a scenic route along Perth's northern beaches. There are two sections to the route, connected by West Coast Highway. The first section is from Stirling Bridge, North Fremantle via Cottesloe to Swanbourne, along Stirling Highway, Tydeman Road, Port Beach Road, Curtin Avenue, Marine Parade, and North Street. The second part connects City Beach to Scarborough, Trigg, North Beach, Hillarys, Mullaloo, and finally Ocean Reef, travelling along Challenger Parade, West Coast Highway, Karrinyup Road, West Coast Drive, Whitfords Avenue, Northshore Drive, Oceanside Promenade, and Ocean Reef Road.

== Tourist Drive 205 ==
Tourist Drive 205 Heritage Country Tourist Drive
- Location: Bedfordale & Roleystone
- Length: 44 km (27 mi)
- Route number: 205

Heritage Country Tourist Drive, designated as Tourist Drive 205, is a scenic and historic route through Bedfordale and Roleystone. After heading east out of Armadale, the route travels in a loop to Churchman Brook Reservoir, Canning Dam, and Wungong Dam, and then returns to Armadale. The tourist drive follows Albany Highway, Carradine Road, Canns Road, Churchman Brook Road, Soldiers Road, Brookton Highway, Croyden Road, McNess Drive, Canning Dam Road, Albany Highway (again), Springfield Road, and Admiral Road, with Albany Highway the final link completing the loop.

== Tourist Drive 206 ==
Tourist Drive 206 Kingsbury Tourist Drive
- Location: Jarrahdale & Serpentine
- Length: 45 km (28 mi)
- Route number: 206

Kingsbury Tourist Drive, designated as Tourist Drive 206, is a scenic route through the jarrah forest in and around Serpentine National Park. The route is a loop that links Jarrahdale, Serpentine Dam, and Serpentine National Park, travelling along Kingsbury Drive, South Western Highway, and Jarrahdale Road.

== Tourist Drive 207 ==
Tourist Drive 207 Darling Range Tourist Drive
- Location: Mundaring – Kalamunda
- Length: 25 km (16 mi)
- Route number: 207

Darling Range Tourist Drive, designated as Tourist Drive 207, is a historic route through the Darling Range near Mundaring. The 25-kilometre-long (16 mi) route travels along Mundaring Weir Road, between the Mundaring and Kalamunda town sites. The drive's main attraction is the historic Mundaring Weir, a component of the Goldfields Water Supply Scheme, which has been described as "Western Australia's greatest engineering feat".

== Tourist Drive 250 ==
Tourist Drive 250 Caves Road Tourist Drive
- Location: Cape Naturaliste – Cape Leeuwin
- Length: 123 km (76 mi)
- Route number: 250

Caves Road Tourist Drive, designated as Tourist Drive 250, is a scenic drive from Cape Naturaliste to Cape Leeuwin, via the Leeuwin-Naturaliste National Park. The 123-kilometre-long (76 mi) route travels almost entirely along Caves Road, as well as Cape Naturaliste Road to that cape. Beyond the southern extent of Caves Road, the tourist drive follows Bussell Highway, Blackwood Avenue, and Leeuwin Road to Cape Leeuwin.

== Tourist Drive 251 ==
Tourist Drive 251 Blackwood River Tourist Drive
- Location: Cape Naturaliste – Cape Leeuwin
- Length: 123 km (76 mi)
- Route number: 251

Blackwood River Tourist Drive, designated as Tourist Drive 251, is a scenic route from Balingup via Nannup to Bridgetown. Much of the route from Balingup to Nannup, on Balingup–Nannup Road and Grange Road, is alongside the Blackwood River, as is the end part of the route near Bridgetown, on Brockman Highway. The direct connection from Balingup to Bridgetown is along South Western Highway, which, while not part of the tourist drive, connects the two ends to form a loop.

== Tourist Drive 252 ==
Tourist Drive 252 Porongurup Tourist Drive
- Location: Mount Barker – Porongurup
- Length: 30 km (19 mi)
- Route number: 252

Porongurup Tourist Drive, designated as Tourist Drive 252, is a scenic route from Mount Barker to Porongurup and the Porongurup National Park. The 30-kilometre-long (19 mi) east–west route travels between Albany Highway and Chester Pass Road, along Oatlands Road and Mount Barker–Porongurup Road. The national park is described as having "many walks, spectacular views, interesting drives and abundant wildlife".

== Tourist Drive 254 ==
Tourist Drive 254 Avon Historic Tourist Drive
- Location: Toodyay – Beverley
- Length: 98 km (61 mi)
- Route number: 254

Avon Historic Tourist Drive, designated as Tourist Drive 254, is a historic route through the Avon Valley and surrounding countryside. The 98-kilometre-long (61 mi) route travels alongside the Avon River, from Toodyay to Northam and York, and finishing at Beverley. The tourist drive follows a number of different roads: Toodyay Road, Northam–Toodyay Road, Katrine Road, Taylor Street, Fitzgerald Street, Burlong Road, Spencers Brook Road, Spencers Brook–York Road, Avon Terrace, Balladong Street, York Road, Top Beverley Road, Great Southern Highway.

== Tourist Drive 255 ==
Tourist Drive 255 Scotsdale Tourist Drive
- Location: Denmark – William Bay National Park
- Length: 35 km (22 mi)
- Route number: 255

Scotsdale Tourist Drive, designated as Tourist Drive 255, is a scenic route through the coastal, forest, and farming areas around Denmark. The 35-kilometre-long (22 mi) route travels north-west from Denmark along Scotsdale Road to Scotsdale. The tourist drive then follows Mount Mcleod Road south to South Coast Highway, which connects it to William Bay Road. That road travels through the William Bay National Park to Greens Pool, a sheltered beach on the state's southern coast.

== Tourist Drive 256 ==
Tourist Drive 256 Lake Argyle Tourist Drive
- Location: Lake Argyle
- Length: 34 km (21 mi)
- Route number: 256

Lake Argyle Tourist Drive, designated as Tourist Drive 256, is a 34-kilometre-long (21 mi) route that connects Victoria Highway, near the Northern Territory border, to the tourist attractions at Lake Argyle. As well as the lake itself, one of the world's largest artificial lakes, there is the historic Argyle Homestead Museum, a tourist village which was originally the construction camp, bushwalking tracks, and a multitude of fauna – birds, marsupials, freshwater crocodiles, and fish living in or around the lake. There are no attractions along the route before Lake Argyle, except for seeing the Kimberley's "rugged landscape".

== Tourist Drive 257 ==
Tourist Drive 257 Albany Historic Tourist Drive
- Location: Albany
- Length: 6 km (3.7 mi)
- Route number: 257

Albany Historic Tourist Drive, designated as Tourist Drive 257, is a historic route through Albany, Western Australia's first settlement. The 6-kilometre-long (3.7 mi) route travels parallel to the coastline, from Middleton Beach, around the base of Mount Adelaide, past Lawley Park and the restored Old Post Office, to the Western Australian Museum – Albany. The tourist drive follows the local roads Marine Drive, Burgoyne Road, Cuddihy Road, Brunswick Road West, Stirling Terrace, and Residency Road.

== Tourist Drive 258 ==
Tourist Drive 258 Frenchman Bay Tourist Drive
- Location: Torndirrup National Park
- Length: 7 km (4.3 mi)
- Route number: 258

Frenchman Bay Tourist Drive, designated as Tourist Drive 258, is a scenic route through the Torndirrup National Park. The 7-kilometre-long (4.3 mi) route travels along Frenchman Bay Road, from the edge of the national park to Frenchman Bay. Many roads turn off the tourist drive, to scenic spots along the coast, including The Gap (a narrow, steep sided ravine), The Natural Bridge (a large granite formation "shaped like a bridge of giants"), The Blowholes (the pressure of water coming into caves during a heavy ocean swell blasts air through cracks in rocks above the caves), Jimmy Newhill's Harbour (a natural harbour in the otherwise rugged coast), and Salmon Holes (a popular fishing spot for the native salmon).

== Tourist Drive 259 ==
Tourist Drive 259 Karri Tourist Drive
- Location: Manjimup – Quinninup
- Length: 88 km (55 mi)
- Route number: 259

Karri Tourist Drive, designated as Tourist Drive 259, is a scenic route through the karri forest south of Manjimup. In addition to the giant karri, which can reach a height of 85 metres (279 ft), the scenery includes streams, freshwater pools, and an undergrowth of ferns and vines. The 88-kilometre-long (55 mi) route travels south from Manjimup, following Gilbert Street, Chopping Street, and South Western Highway, before turning off to Pemberton along Eastbourne Road, Diamond Tree Road, and Pemberton North Road. The tourist drive takes Vasse Highway, Pemberton Northcliffe Road, and Zamia Street into Northcliffe, before heading in a north-easterly direction along Wheatley Coast Road, to return to South Western Highway near Quinninup where the route ends. There are many wildflowers and picnic spots along the route.

== Tourist Drive 260 ==
Tourist Drive 260 Australind Bunbury Tourist Drive
- Location: Leschenault – Bunbury
- Length: 14 km (8.7 mi)
- Route number: 260

Australind Bunbury Tourist Drive, designated as Tourist Drive 260, is a 14-kilometre-long (8.7 mi) historic route from Leschenault to Bunbury via Australind, Western Australia. From Forrest Highway (at the point that was the intersection of the former Australind Bypass and Old Coast Road), the route travels south to Australind via Old Coast Road, east of the Leschenault Inlet. At Pelicon Point, the route turns south-west along Estuary Drive, entering Bunbury after crossing the Preston River.

== Tourist Drive 350 ==
Tourist Drive 350 Geikie–Windjana Tourist Way
- Location: Geikie Gorge National Park – Windjana Gorge National Park
- Length: 166 km (103 mi)
- Route number: 350

Geikie–Windjana Tourist Way, designated as Tourist Drive 350, is a 166-kilometre-long (103 mi) scenic route connecting national parks in Western Australia's Kimberly region. From Fitzroy Crossing, the route travels north-east to Geikie Gorge National Park along Forrest Road, Russ Road, Geikie Gorge Road. It also travels west from the town along Great Northern Highway to Leopold Downs Road, the turn-off to Tunnel Creek National Park. The tourist drive continues along Fairfield–Leopold Downs Road to Windjana Gorge National Park, and ends at Derby Gibb River Road near the Lennard River. The route is only accessible in the dry season, from April to November.

== Tourist Drive 351 ==
Tourist Drive 351 Cossack Tourist Way
- Location: Burrup Peninsula – Point Samson
- Length: 77 km (48 mi)
- Route number: 351

Cossack Tourist Way, designated as Tourist Drive 351, is a 77-kilometre-long (48 mi) scenic and historic route along the state's north-west coast. From Dampier, the route travels up the Burrup Peninsula on Burrup Road to Woodside Petroleum's North West Shelf Visitors Centre. The Burrup Peninsula is also the location of historic Aboriginal rock carvings and etchings which are thousands of years. South-east of Dampier, the route travels to Karratha, and then on to the historic town of Roebourne, along Dampier Highway, Karratha Road, and North West Coastal Highway. North of Roebourne, the route splits, with one leg travelling to the coastal ghost town of Cossack, and the other leg heading via Wickham to the nearby fishing village of Point Samson.

== Tourist Drive 352 ==
Tourist Drive 352 Cape Range Tourist Way
- Location: North West Cape
- Length: 121 km (75 mi)
- Route number: 352

Cape Range Tourist Way, designated as Tourist Drive 352, is a 121-kilometre-long (75 mi) scenic route along the coast of the North West Cape. From Learmonth, the route travels up the eastern side of the cape to Exmouth via the Minilya–Exmouth Road. It continues along Murat Road, Laermonth Minilya Road, and Yardie Creek Road to the Vlaming Head Lighthouse, and then follows Yardie Creek Road down the western side of the cape, through the Cape Range National Park, until it reaches Yardie Creek Gorge.

== Tourist Drive 353 ==
Tourist Drive 353 Shark Bay Tourist Way
- Location: Shark Bay
- Length: 155 km (96 mi)
- Route number: 353

Shark Bay Tourist Way, designated as Tourist Drive 353, is a 155-kilometre-long (96 mi) scenic route around Shark Bay, in the state's Gascoyne region. The route travels along Shark Bay Road and Monkey Mia Road, from North West Coastal Highway near the Overlander Roadhouse, via Hamelin Pool Marine Nature Reserve and Denham, to Monkey Mia, which is famous for its wild but friendly bottlenose dolphins.

== Tourist Drive 354 ==
Tourist Drive 354 Batavia Coast Tourist Way
- Location: Dongara – Kalbarri National Park
- Length: 244 km (152 mi)
- Route number: 354

Batavia Coast Tourist Way, designated as Tourist Drive 354, is a 244-kilometre-long (152 mi) scenic route from Dongara to Kalbarri National Park, along the coast of the state's Mid West region. The route travels along Brand Highway and North West Coastal Highway to the national park, turns inland to Kalbarri along Kalbarri Road. Within the townsite the route follows Clotworthy Street and Grey Street. It departs southbound on Red Bluff Road, adjacent to the coast, and continues along George Grey Drive through the south-western portion of Kalbarri National Park.

== Tourist Drive 355 ==
Tourist Drive 355 Collie Tourist Way
- Location: Roelands – Muja
- Length: 57 km (35 mi)
- Route number: 355

Collie Tourist Way, designated as Tourist Drive 355, is a scenic and historic route around the Western Australia's largest coalfield. The 57-kilometre-long (35 mi) route travels across the Darling Range on Coalfields Highway, from Roelands to Collie River in Muja. It turns off at Centaur Road, alongside the river, and travels to the Muja Tourist lookout, overlooking the nearby working coal seam. On the way the route passes near the scenic Wellington Dam and Ferguson Valley, and travels through the historic coal mining town of Collie.

== Tourist Drive 356 ==
Tourist Drive 356 Great Southern Tourist Way
- Location: Beverley – Albany
- Length: 381 km (237 mi)
- Route number: 356

Great Southern Tourist Way, designated as Tourist Drive 356, is a 381-kilometre-long (237 mi) historic route that follows the Great Southern Railway from Beverley to Albany. The route travels along Great Southern Highway and Albany Highway, through the many settlements that have their origins across in the 137-year-old railway. The main attractions include Pingelly, Narrogin, Wagin, Katanning, Cranbrook, and Mount Barker.

== Tourist Drive 357 ==
Tourist Drive 357 Goldfields Tourist Way
- Location: Coolgardie – Kalgoorlie
- Length: 45 km (28 mi)
- Route number: 357

Goldfields Tourist Way, designated as Tourist Drive 357, is a 45-kilometre-long (28 mi) historic route in the state's goldfields. The route travels along Great Eastern Highway, from the Coolgardie Camel Farm four kilometres (2.5 mi) west of Coolgardie, to Kalgoorlie. The entire length of the route coincides with the easternmost section of the Golden Pipeline Heritage Trail, which travels from Perth to Kalgoorlie alongside the Goldfields Water Supply Scheme pipeline. The heritage trail is a more recent initiative, introduced in 2003 for the pipeline's 100th anniversary.

== Tourist Drive 358 ==
Tourist Drive 358 Esperance Tourist Way
- Location: Esperance
- Length: 30 km (19 mi)
- Route number: 358

Esperance Tourist Way, designated as Tourist Drive 358, is a 30-kilometre-long (19 mi) scenic route along the Esperance coast and the nearby Pink Lake. The route starts in the centre of Esperance, travels along the coastline on Twilight Beach Road, passing numerous beaches and coves, and then continues inland on Eleven Mile Beach Road to Pink Lake. The tourist drive doesn't quite form a complete loop, but Pink Lake Drive connects the two ends.

== Tourist Drive 359 ==
Tourist Drive 359 Chittering Valley Tourist Way
- Location: Wanneroo – Chittering
- Length: 70 km (43 mi)
- Route number: 359

Chittering Valley Tourist Way, designated as Tourist Drive 359, is a 70-kilometre-long (43 mi) scenic route across the Gnangara-Moore River State Forest and through the Chittering Valley. The route starts on Pinjar Road in Ashby (just north of Wanneroo), at its intersection with Wanneroo Road. It then heads east through the state forest on Neaves Road to Bullsbrook, travelling for a short distance on Railway Parade, Rutland Road, and Great Northern Highway. The route continues along Chittering Road to Chittering, following the Brockman River and its tributaries. It deviates onto Chittering Valley Road, continuing to follow the river's path, but soon after returns to Chittering Road. Chittering Valley Tourist Way ends at Great Northern Highway, a short distance away from Bindoon.

== Tourist Drive 360 ==
Tourist Drive 360 Midlands Tourist Way
- Location: Upper Swan – Watheroo National Park
- Length: 204 km (127 mi)
- Route number: 360

Midlands Tourist Way, designated as Tourist Drive 360, is a 204-kilometre-long (127 mi) scenic and historic route through agriculture areas in the state's Wheatbelt region, north of Perth. From Upper Swan, the route travels north along Great Northern Highway to Walebing, and then west along The Midlands Road to Moora, and then continuing north to Watheroo National Park. Attractions along the way include the Walyunga National Park, where the Avon River becomes the Swan River (Western Australia), the historic towns of Bindoon and New Norcia, and the wildflowers north of Moora.

== See also ==
- List of road routes in Western Australia
- Tourism in Perth
