= Canning Basin =

Geological basin in Western Australia

Coordinates: 18°11′15″S 124°18′37″E

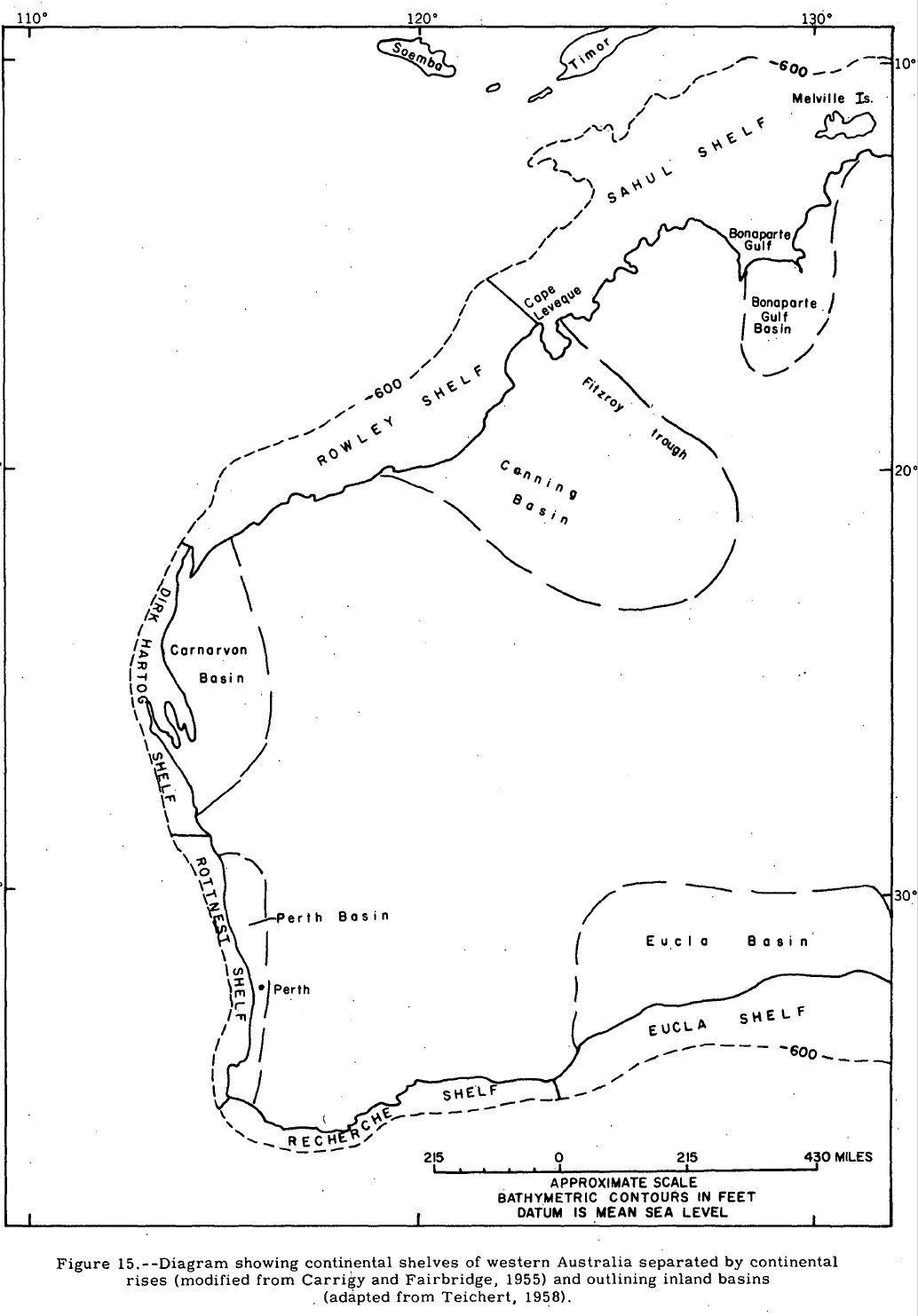
Map of continental shelves of Western Australia. Canning Basin can be seen in the northern region near Rowley and Sahul Shelf's.

The Canning Basin is a geological basin located in Western Australia. Deposition of sediments began after early-Ordovician thermal subsidence, and continued into the Early Cretaceous. The Basin covers approximately 507,000 km^{2} of which approximately 430,000 km^{2} is on land. The basin is also a distinct physiographic province of the larger West Australian Shield division.

== Description ==
The Canning Basin is home to a Devonian fossil reef complex that stretches 350 km across the northern edge of the basin. The fossil reef is very well preserved and is cut by several modern canyons, including Geikie Gorge and Windjana Gorge. The fossil sites associated the ancient reef system that extended for around one thousand kilometres along what is now the northwest of the Australian continent, described as resembling the modern Great Barrier Reef off the coast of Eastern Australia. The sites have produced ancient fossil material in an excellent state of preservation, most notably those revealing details of the structure of skeletons and soft-tissues of early amphibians. One important site is referred to as the "Devonian 'Great Barrier Reef'", and another, the "Gogo fish fossil site" (the Gogo formation), is named for the discovery of the Gogo fish.

The internal features of the basin include:

- sub basins - the Fitzroy Trough-Gregory Sub-basin complex, the Willara Sub-basin, and the Kidson Sub-basin complex
- shelves - Anketell shelf, Billiluna shelf, Tabletop shelf, Lennard shelf, Ryan Shelf
- terraces - Balgo terrace

== Human activity ==
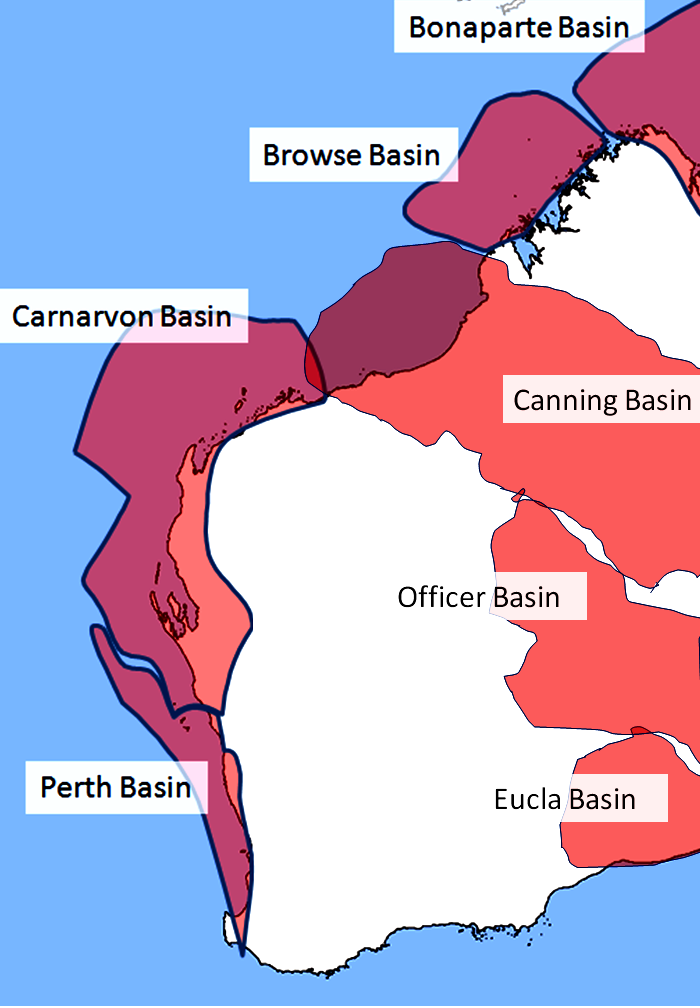
Approximate locations of petroleum basins in Western Australia including Canning Basin. Map made in 2008 by the Australian Bureau of Agricultural and Resource Economics.

It has been recognised as having prospective oil and gas capacity and has been studied extensively; as of June 2003 250 wells have been drilled and 78,000 km of seismic shot.

The Australian Bureau of Mineral Resources report of the geology of the basin outlines the early exploration:

The Bureau started field work in the Canning Basin in 1947 and continued every year up to 1958. This work was carried out by geological parties equipped with land vehicles (1947-56) and with a helicopter (1957), by seismic and gravity parties, by an airborne magnetic party, and by a stratigraphical drilling party (1955-58). All work was based on air photographs, at a scale of 1:50,000, prepared by the R.A.A.F. This bulletin incorporates the results of all these surveys. The first attempt at compiling a geology of the Canning Basin was made by Reeves in 1949

The basin supplies water to some of the iron ore mining in Western Australia.
