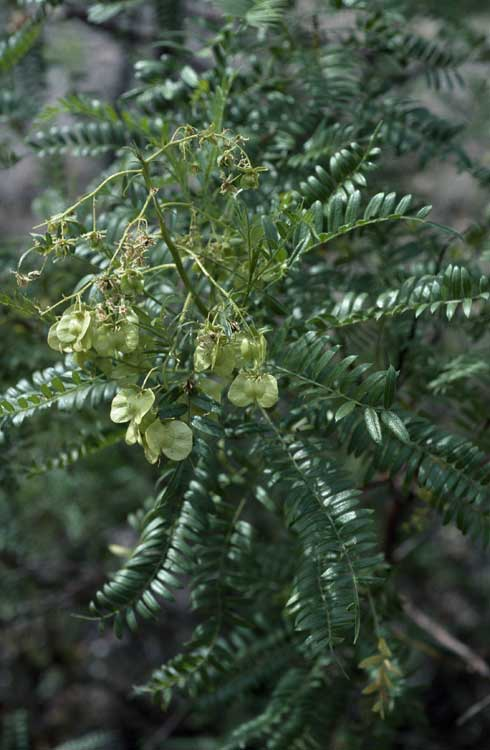
- In the Windjana Gorge National Park

Scientific classification
- Kingdom: Plantae
- Clade: Tracheophytes
- Clade: Angiosperms
- Clade: Eudicots
- Clade: Rosids
- Order: Sapindales
- Family: Sapindaceae
- Genus: Dodonaea
- Species: D. polyzyga

Binomial name
- Dodonaea polyzyga F.Muell.

= Dodonaea polyzyga =

Species of plant

Dodonaea polyzyga is a species of plant in the family Sapindaceae and is endemic to north-western Australia. It is an erect, sticky shrub with imparipinnate leaves with 28 to 46 leaflets, flowers arranged in panicles on the ends of branches with four to six sepals and ten to twelve stamens, and capsules with three membranous wings.

== Description ==
Dodonaea polyzyga is an erect, andromonoecious or gynomonoecious shrub that typically grows to a height of up to 3 m (9.8 ft). Its leaves are imparipinnate with 28 to 46 oblong side leaflets 10.5–21.5 mm (0.41–0.85 in) long and 3–6 mm (0.12–0.24 in) wide, the end leaflet narrowly elliptic or lance-shaped, 9–15 mm (0.35–0.59 in) long and mostly 2–4 mm (0.079–0.157 in) wide, the petiole 12–21 mm (0.47–0.83 in) long. The flowers are arranged on the ends of branches in panicles, each flower on a pedicel 7–11 mm (0.28–0.43 in) long. There are 4 to 6 egg-shaped sepals and 10 to 12 stamens and the ovary is covered with a few soft hairs. The fruit is an egg-shaped capsule, 12–17 mm (0.47–0.67 in) long and 21–27 mm (0.83–1.06 in) wide with 3 membranous wings 7–10 mm (0.28–0.39 in) wide.

== Taxonomy ==
Dodonaea polyzyga was first formally described in 1857 by Ferdinand von Mueller in Hooker's Journal of Botany and Kew Garden Miscellany. The specific epithet (polyzyga) means 'many-yoked', referring to the many leaflets.

== Distribution and habitat ==
This species of Dodonaea grows on rocky slopes in the Central Kimberley, Dampierland, Northern Kimberley, Ord Victoria Plain, Tanami and Victoria Bonaparte bioregions of Western Australia and the Ord Victoria Plain, Tanami, Victoria Bonaparte and Sturt Plateau bioregions of the northern parts of the Northern Territory.

== Conservation status ==
Dodonaea polyzyga is listed as "not threatened" by the Government of Western Australia Department of Biodiversity, Conservation and Attractions and as of "least concern" under the Territory Parks and Wildlife Conservation Act.
