= Nonny =

Nonny is a given name. Notable people with the name include:

- Nonny Hogrogian (born 1932), Armenian-American writer and illustrator
- Nonny de la Peña, American pioneer in virtual reality
- Nonny, a character from the American animated television series Bubble Guppies.

== See also ==
- Hey Nonny Nonny (disambiguation)
- Noni (disambiguation)
- Nonnie
