= Are We There Yet? (picture book) =

2004 picture book by Alison Lester

Are We There Yet? A Journey Around Australia
- Cover of the book
- Author: Alison Lester
- Illustrator: Alison Lester
- Language: English
- Genre: Children's, picture book
- Publisher: Kane/Miller Book Publishers
- Publication date: October 4, 2004
- Publication place: Australia
- Pages: 31
- ISBN: 978-0-670-88067-6

Are We There Yet? A Journey Around Australia is a 2004 children's picture book by Australian author and illustrator Alison Lester. It is about a girl named Grace going on a road trip around Australia.

== Plot summary ==
Set on Australia, Grace, an eight year old girl, is taken on a road trip around Australia with her family. Before the trip started, the family had practiced living in their grandfather's caravan for three months. Before they leave, Grace helps her grandmother pin a big map of Australia so they can follow their journey.

During the trip, the family sightsees multiple destinations, including the Barossa Valley and camping on the edge of Flinders Ranges. The family also sees Streaky Bay, Murphy's Haystacks, the Nullarbor Plain, and the Great Australian Bight. The family then goes to Rottnest Island, Perth, the Pinnacles, Monkey Mia to see whales, Turquoise Bay, Broome, Tunnel Creek National Park, Tanami Track, Uluru, the Katherine Gorge, Kakadu National Park, Gunlom Falls, the Barkly Highway, et cetera.

At the end of the road trip, Grace hugs her pet animals.

== Reception ==
The book has won the following awards:

- Shortlisted in 2004 Nielsen BookData Booksellers Choice Awards (Prize for Writing for Young Adults)
- Winner in 2005 CBC Book of the Year (Picture Book)
- Shortlisted in 2006 Books I Love Best Yearly (BILBY) – QLD Awards (Early readers)
- Winner in 2006 Kids Own Australian Literature Award (KOALA) (Picture Book)
- Shortlisted in 2007 Kids Own Australian Literature Award (KOALA) (Picture Book)
- Shortlisted in 2008 Kids Own Australian Literature Award (KOALA) (Picture Book)
- Honour Book in 2009 Kids Own Australian Literature Award (KOALA) (Picture Book)
- Shortlisted in 2008 KROC Award (Picture Book)
- Winner in 2009 KROC Award (Picture Book)
- Winner in 2006 Young Australian Best Book Award (YABBA) (Picture Book)
- Winner in 2009 Young Australian Best Book Award (YABBA) (Picture Book)
