= Devonian Reef =

Geological sequence in the Kimberley region of Western Australia

Coordinates: 17°47′S 125°15′E

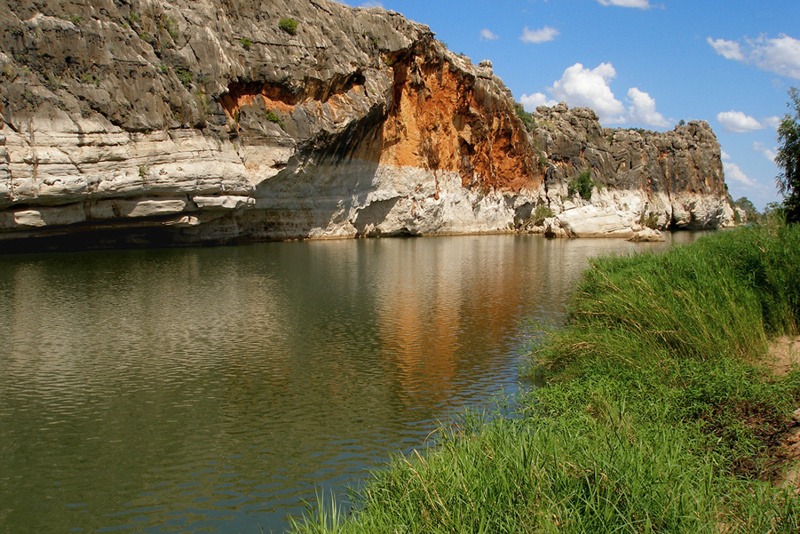
Geikie Gorge National Park, Western Australia, Fitzroy River

The Balili Conservation Park or Devonian Reef Conservation Park is an Australian protected area and is located in the Kimberley region of Western Australia, about 50km North-West of Fitzroy Crossing. It includes Geikie Gorge National Park, Tunnel Creek National Park and Windjana Gorge National Park.

== History ==
The area was covered by a shallow sea with a limestone reef being formed over a period of 20 million years during the Devonian Period, around 380 to 360 million years ago. The reef then became extinct with valleys subsequently forming leading to the landforms that are exposed today.

In 2017 a joint management plan for Bulali was agreed to between the Bunuba Dawangarri traditional owners and the Western Australian government.

== Danggu Geikie Gorge National Park ==
The Danggu Geikie Gorge National Park is situated 20 kilometres from Fitzroy Crossing and 280 Kilometres from Derby. The Fitzroy River has carved a 30 metre deep gorge between the Oscar and Geike Ranges. Evidence of fossils and strata of ancient limestone reef are exposed revealing evidence of life in the Devonian Period.

== Tunnel Creek National Park ==
Tunnel Creek National Park is situated 115 kilometres from Fitzroy Crossing, 180 kilometres from Derby and 30 kilometres south-west of Winjana Gorge. Found in the Napier Ranges, this national park contains Western Australia's oldest cave system, used by Jandamarra, an Aboriginal leader. Tunnel Creek flows through the limestone range for a distance of 750 metres. The Caves house colonies of bats and impressive stalactites. At least five species of bat have made these caves their home.

== Windjana Gorge National Park ==
Also found in the Napier Ranges, Windjana Gorge spans 3.5 kilometres and reaches a height of 100 metres in places. The Lennard River flows through the gorge.
