= Bamazomus hunti =

Scientific classification
- Kingdom: Animalia
- Phylum: Arthropoda
- Subphylum: Chelicerata
- Class: Arachnida
- Order: Schizomida
- Family: Hubbardiidae
- Genus: Bamazomus
- Species: B. hunti

Binomial name
- Bamazomus hunti Harvey, 2001

Species of short-tailed whip-scorpion

Bamazomus hunti is a species of schizomid arachnid (commonly known as a short-tailed whip-scorpion) in the Hubbardiidae family. It is endemic to Australia. It was described in 2001 by Australian arachnologist Mark Harvey. The specific epithet hunti honours Glenn Hunt, an arachnid enthusiast.

== Distribution and habitat ==
The species occurs in the Kimberley region of North West Western Australia. The type locality is The Tunnel (Cave KO-1) at Tunnel Creek.

== Behaviour ==
The arachnids are cave-dwelling, terrestrial predators.
