= Bamazomus weipa =

Scientific classification
- Kingdom: Animalia
- Phylum: Arthropoda
- Subphylum: Chelicerata
- Class: Arachnida
- Order: Schizomida
- Family: Hubbardiidae
- Genus: Bamazomus
- Species: B. weipa

Binomial name
- Bamazomus weipa (Harvey, 1992)

Synonyms
- Apozomus weipa Harvey, 1992

Species of short-tailed whip-scorpion

Bamazomus weipa is a species of schizomid arachnid (commonly known as a short-tailed whip-scorpion) in the Hubbardiidae family. It is endemic to Australia. It was described in 1992 by Australian arachnologist Mark Harvey. The specific epithet weipa refers to the type locality.

== Distribution and habitat ==
The species occurs in Far North Queensland, at the northern end of the Cape York Peninsula, in plant litter in closed forest habitats. The type locality is near Weipa.

== Behaviour ==
The arachnids are terrestrial predators.
