= Bamazomus =

Scientific classification
- Domain: Eukaryota
- Kingdom: Animalia
- Phylum: Arthropoda
- Subphylum: Chelicerata
- Class: Arachnida
- Order: Schizomida
- Family: Hubbardiidae
- Genus: Bamazomus; Harvey, 1992

Type species
- Bamazomus bamaga Harvey, 1992

Species
- 11, see text

Genus of short-tailed whip-scorpions

Bamazomus is a genus of hubbardiid short-tailed whip-scorpions, first described by Mark Harvey in 1992.

== Species ==
As of September 2022, the World Schizomida Catalog accepted the following eleven species:

- Bamazomus aviculus Harvey, 2001 – Seychelles
- Bamazomus bamaga Harvey, 1992 – Australia (Queensland)
- Bamazomus hunti Harvey, 2001 – Australia (Western Australia)
- Bamazomus madagassus (Lawrence, 1969) – Madagascar
- Bamazomus milloti (Lawrence, 1969) – Madagascar
- Bamazomus pileti (Brignoli, 1974) – Malaysia (mainland)
- Bamazomus serendipitus Craig, 2024 – Denmark (introduced, exotic)
- Bamazomus shanghang Zheng, Gong & Zhang, 2024 – China (Fujian)
- Bamazomus siamensis (Hansen, 1905) – Hong Kong, Japan, Thailand, Hawaii
- Bamazomus songi Zheng, Gong & Zhang, 2024 – China (Guangdong)
- Bamazomus subsolanus Harvey, 2001 – Australia (Western Australia)
- Bamazomus vadoni (Lawrence, 1969) – Madagascar
- Bamazomus vespertinus Harvey, 2001 – Australia (Western Australia)
- Bamazomus weipa (Harvey, 1992) – Australia (Queensland)
