= Windjana Gorge National Park =

National park in the Kimberley region of Western Australia

- IUCN category II (national park)
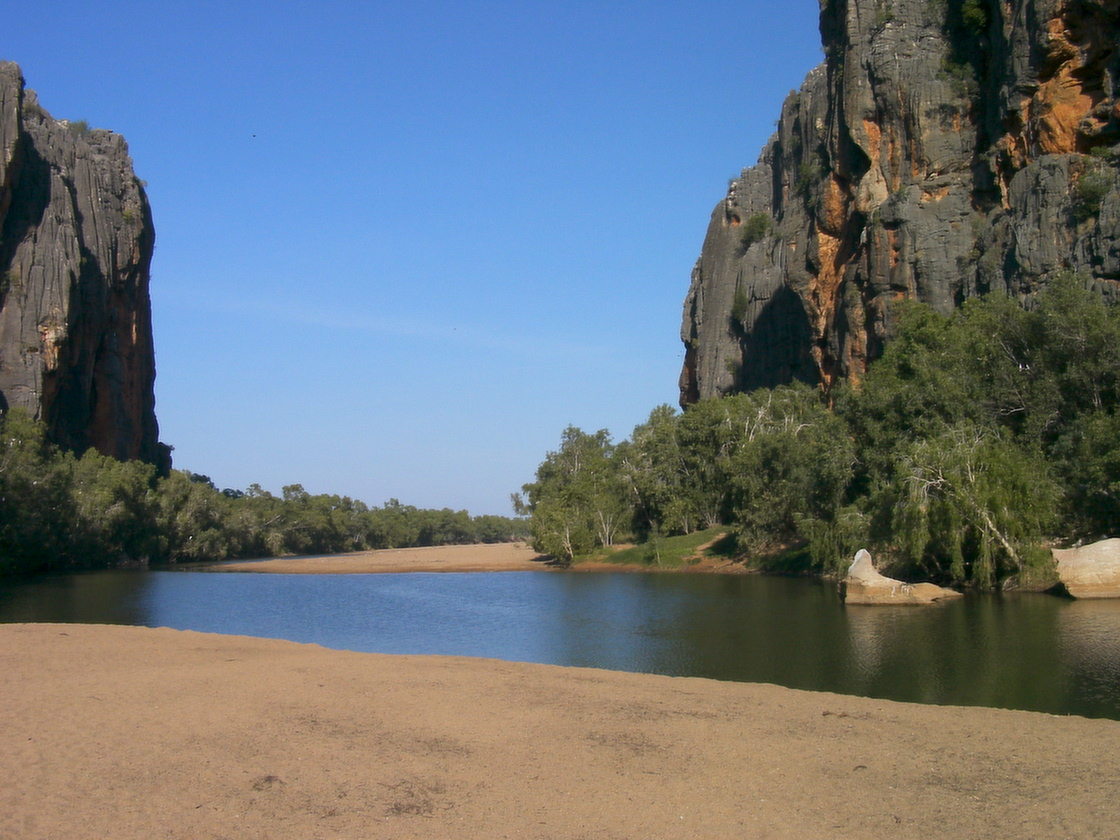
- View from base of gorge

- Location within Western Australia
- Location: Western Australia
- Nearest city: Derby
- Coordinates: 17°25′42″S 124°58′35″E
- Area: 20.5 km^{2} (7.9 sq mi)
- Established: 1971
- Governing body: Department of Environment and Conservation
- Website: Official website

Windjana Gorge National Park is a national park in the Kimberley region of Western Australia, 1855 km northeast of Perth and 355 km east of Broome. It is open during the dry season only, usually April to November (dates vary according to conditions).

The gorge has been carved by the Lennard River and is over 3 km long and about 100 m wide with walls to a height of 30 m in places. The rocks are part of the Napier Range, an ancient Devonian reef system that is over 375 million years old. The rocks are the same as the ones found at Tunnel Creek and Geikie Gorge.

The river flows freely through the gorge during the wet season but during the dry season (between May and September) it becomes a series of pools surrounded by trees and shrubs. Some of the vegetation found along the river banks include paperbarks, cadjebuts, native fig trees and leichhardt trees.

It is part of the Balili (Devonian Reef) Conservation Park.

== See also ==
- Protected areas of Western Australia
