= Tunnel Creek National Park =

National park in Western Australia

- IUCN category II (national park)
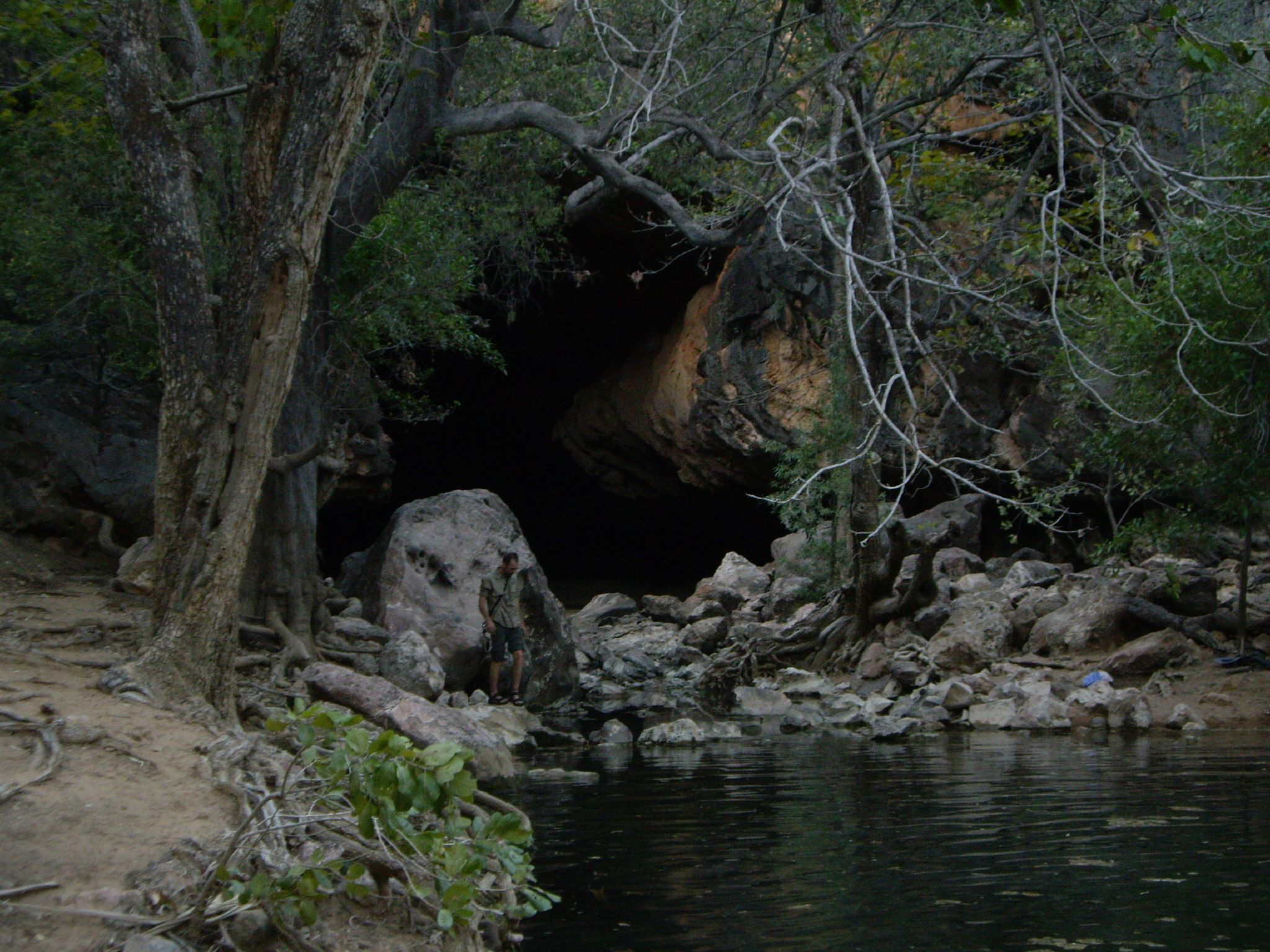
- Tunnel Creek in the Kimberley region of Western Australia

- Location within Western Australia
- Location: Western Australia
- Nearest city: Derby
- Coordinates: 17°36′43″S 125°08′34″E
- Area: 91 ha (220 acres)
- Established: 1992
- Governing body: Department of Environment and Conservation
- Website: https://parks.dpaw.wa.gov.au/park/tunnel-creek

Tunnel Creek National Park is a national park in the Kimberley region of Western Australia, 1,845 kilometres (1,146 mi) northeast of Perth and 390 km (240 mi) east of Broome. The natural cave through which Tunnel Creek flows is a major attraction of the park.

Many Aboriginal rock paintings and speleothems are present in the cave decorating the walls. The cave was the hideout of the Aboriginal warrior Jandamarra, who was killed outside the entrance of the cave in 1897. It is part of the Balili (Devonian Reef) Conservation Park.

== Geography ==
The park is located in the Napier Range and covers an area of 91 hectares (220 acres). The range is composed of limestone and is the remains of a Devonian reef system formed around 350 million years ago.

The tunnel component of Tunnel Creek has a length of approximately 750 m (2,460 ft) that runs underground and is one of the oldest cave systems in Western Australia. The reef was first exposed around 250 million years ago and the first cave systems began to form; the present cave systems were created about 20 million years ago.

The cave reaches a maximum height of 12 m (39 ft) and has a maximum width of 15 m (49 ft). The creek was once known as "The Cave of the Bats", with at least five species of bat inhabiting the cavern. There are large pools of water on the floor of the cave in which freshwater crocodiles have been found. The pools indicate that the water table is only just below the present floor surface and water only flows through the area after heavy rainfall.

== See also ==
- Protected areas of Western Australia
- Gibb River Road
