= Nonnie =

Nonnie is a given name. Notable people with the name include:

- Nonnie Griffin (1933–2019), Canadian actress
- Nonnie Moore (1922–2009), American fashion editor
- Nonnie May Stewart (1878–1923), American-born heiress and member of the Greek royal family later known as Princess Anastasia of Greece and Denmark

== See also ==
- Nonnie & Alex, 1995 short film
- Nonny
- Noni (disambiguation)
