= Noni the Pony Goes to the Beach =

Picture book by Alison Lester

- Author: Alison Lester
- Illustrator: Alison Lester
- Language: English
- Subject: Children's literature, picture book, Ponies
- Published: 2014 (Allen & Unwin)
- Publication place: Australia
- Media type: Print (hardback, paperback)
- Pages: 26 (unpaginated)
- ISBN: 9781743311141
- OCLC: 891163093

Noni the Pony Goes to the Beach a 2014 children's picture book by Alison Lester. It is about a pony called Noni who, with her friends Dave dog and Coco the cat, spends a day by the seaside.

== Publication history ==
- 2014, Australia, Allen & Unwin ISBN 9781743311141
- 2015, USA, Beach Lane Books ISBN 9781481446259

== Reception ==
A review in School Library Journal of Noni the Pony Goes to the Beach stated "A perfect blend of text and pictures makes this an outstanding offering for the youngest crowd."

Noni the Pony Goes to the Beach has also been reviewed by The New York Times, Horn Book Guide Reviews, Scan, and Magpies.

It is a 2015 Children's Book Council of Australia (CBCA) Early Childhood Honour book, and appears on a CBCA favourite books list.

The National Centre for Australian Children's Literature holds preliminary and final artwork for the book.

== See also ==
- Noni the Pony
- Noni the Pony Rescues a Joey
