= Noni the Pony Rescues a Joey =

Picture book by Alison Lester

- Author: Alison Lester
- Illustrator: Alison Lester
- Language: English
- Subject: Children's literature, picture book, Ponies
- Published: 2018 (Allen & Unwin)
- Publication place: Australia
- Media type: Print (hardback, paperback)
- Pages: 24 (unpaginated)
- ISBN: 9781911631002
- OCLC: 1079337535

Noni the Pony Rescues a Joey is a 2018 children's picture book by Alison Lester. It is about Noni, a pony, and her friends, Dave dog, and Coco the cat, who find a lost Wallaby joey and manage to reunite him with his mob.

== Publication history ==
- 2018, Australia, Allen & Unwin ISBN 9781911631002
- 2019, USA, Beach Lane Books ISBN 9781534443709

== Reception ==
A reviewer for Reading Time of Noni the Pony Rescues a Joey wrote "The effortless rhyme with signature Noni illustrations is a delight to read.".

Noni the Pony Rescues a Joey has also been reviewed by Booklist, Kirkus Reviews, The Horn Book Magazine, Good Reading magazine, School Library Journal, and the International Literacy Association.

It is a 2019 Children's Book Council of Australia (CBCA) Early Childhood Notable book, and a 2019 Speech Pathology Australia Book of the Year Award (Birth to Three Years) shortlisted book.

== See also ==
- Noni the Pony
- Noni the Pony Goes to the Beach
