= Bamazomus bamaga =

Scientific classification
- Kingdom: Animalia
- Phylum: Arthropoda
- Subphylum: Chelicerata
- Class: Arachnida
- Order: Schizomida
- Family: Hubbardiidae
- Genus: Bamazomus
- Species: B. bamaga

Binomial name
- Bamazomus bamaga Harvey, 1992

Species of short-tailed whip-scorpion

Bamazomus bamaga is a species of schizomid arachnid (commonly known as a short-tailed whip-scorpion) in the Hubbardiidae family. It is endemic to Australia. It was described in 1992 by Australian arachnologist Mark Harvey. The specific epithet bamaga refers to the type locality.

== Distribution and habitat ==
The species occurs in Far North Queensland, at the northern end of the Cape York Peninsula and adjacent Prince of Wales Island. It inhabits plant litter in closed forest habitats. The type locality is Bamaga.

== Behaviour ==
The arachnids are terrestrial predators.
