= Bamazomus subsolanus =

Scientific classification
- Kingdom: Animalia
- Phylum: Arthropoda
- Subphylum: Chelicerata
- Class: Arachnida
- Order: Schizomida
- Family: Hubbardiidae
- Genus: Bamazomus
- Species: B. subsolanus

Binomial name
- Bamazomus subsolanus Harvey, 2001

Species of short-tailed whip-scorpion

Bamazomus subsolanus is a species of schizomid arachnid (commonly known as a short-tailed whip-scorpion) in the Hubbardiidae family. It is endemic to Australia. It was described in 2001 by Australian arachnologist Mark Harvey. The specific epithet subsolanus (Latin: ‘eastern’) refers to the position of the type locality.

== Distribution and habitat ==
The species occurs in North West Western Australia. The type locality is an unnamed limestone quarry on the eastern side of the Cape Range Peninsula.

== Behaviour ==
The arachnids are cave-dwelling, terrestrial predators.
