= Noni the Pony =

Picture book by Alison Lester

- Author: Alison Lester
- Illustrator: Alison Lester
- Language: English
- Subject: Children's literature, picture book, Ponies
- Published: 2010 (Allen & Unwin)
- Publication place: Australia
- Media type: Print (hardback, paperback)
- Pages: 32 (unpaginated)
- ISBN: 9781741758887
- OCLC: 585906804

Noni the Pony is a 2010 children's picture book by Alison Lester. It is about a day with a friendly, caring pony called Noni and her friends, Dave dog, and Coco the cat.

== Publication history ==
- 2010, Australia, Allen & Unwin ISBN 9781741758887
- 2012, USA, Beach Lane Books ISBN 9781442459595

== Reception ==
Booklist wrote, in a review of Noni the Pony, "The graphic art, with its soft, round shapes and soothing, textured background colors, will appeal to small children, as will the cheery couplets." and Kirkus Reviews described Noni as "the perfect pony for preschoolers", and Lester's illustrations as "droll".

Noni the Pony has also been reviewed by The New York Times, School Library Journal, Horn Book Guide Reviews, Books+Publishing, Publishers Weekly, Educating Young Children, Every Child, Magpies, Reading Time, and Scan.

== See also ==
- Noni the Pony Goes to the Beach
- Noni the Pony Rescues a Joey
