= Noni Bhoumik =

Indian writer and translator of Russian literature

Noni Bhoumik (Bangla: ননী ভৌমিক; 1921–1996) was a Bengali writer and translator, primarily known for his translations of Russian literature into Bengali.

He was born in Rangpur, Bengal Presidency, in British India, and studied in Rangpur and Pabna before moving to Birbhum. A committed leftist from an early age, he joined the Communist Party and was active in anti-fascist progressive circles. He was arrested and jailed for his political activism. He saw from up close the cataclysmic events that shook Bengal in the 1940s, namely the Bengal famine, the 1946 riots, the Tebhaga movement, etc. His experiences inspired books such as the short story collection Dhankana and the novel Dhulomati. Other books include Choitrodin and Agontuk. He also edited the journal Porichoy, as a result of which he became closely acquainted with the writer Sulekha Sanyal.

However, without advancing the relationship further, Bhoumik left for Moscow in 1957, where he had been hired by Progress Publishers to translate Soviet and Russian books into Bengali. It is in this role that he reached a wide audience in both West Bengal and post-independence Bangladesh. Bhoumik translated or co-translated numerous works of Russian literature, among them works by Pushkin, Tolstoy and Dostoyevsky. He translated John Reed's Ten Days that Shook the World into Bengali. He gained special renown for his masterful translations of Russian children's books, many of which continue to be read to this day. Among the children's writers he translated are:

- Nikolai Nosov
- Arkadi Gaidar
- Pyotr Manteifel
- Anatoly Aleksin

His own original writing suffered as a result of his prolific translation work. However, he did write a book on his Soviet travels, titled Moru o Monjori. He married in Russia and remained there for the rest of his life. It reported that he died in a road accident in 1996.

He was responsible for recruiting the translator Arun Shom to Moscow in 1974. His life and work was commemorated in two editions of the West Bengal literary journal Katharup.
