= Jandamarra =

Aboriginal Australian warrior of the late 19th century

- Born: c. 1873
- Died: April 1, 1897; Tunnel Creek, Western Australia
- Burial place: Napier Range
- Military career
- Allegiance: Bunuba
- Service years: 1894–1897
- Nicknames: Pigeon, Crow
- Conflicts: Australian frontier wars

Jandamarra or Tjandamurra (c. 1873–1 April 1897), known to British settlers as Pigeon, was an Aboriginal Australian man of the Bunuba people who led one of many organised armed insurrections against the British colonisation of Australia. Initially employed as a tracker for the police, he became a fugitive when he was forced to capture his own people. He led a three-year campaign against police and British settlers, achieving legendary status for his hit and run tactics and his abilities to hide and disappear. Jandamarra was eventually killed by another tracker at Tunnel Creek on 1 April 1897. His body was buried by his family at the Napier Range, where it was placed inside a boab tree. Jandamarra's life has been the subject of two novels, Ion Idriess's Outlaws of the Leopold (1952) and Mudrooroo's Long Live Sandawarra (1972), a non-fiction account based on oral tradition, Jandamarra and the Bunuba Resistance, and a stage play.

== Biography ==
=== Birth and youth ===
The Bunuba land was positioned in the southern part of the Kimberley region in the far north of the state of Western Australia, and stretched from the town of Fitzroy Crossing to the Wunaamin Miliwundi Ranges; it included the Napier and Oscar Ranges.

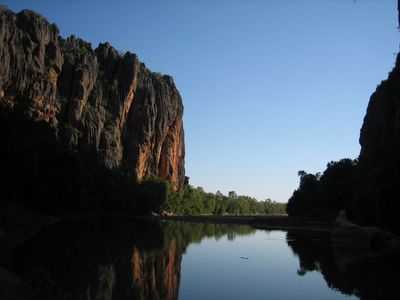
Windjana Gorge

From a young age, Jandamarra learned to ride horses, speak English fluently, shear sheep and use guns on William Lukin's station at Lennard River, and was regarded as the area's best Aboriginal stockman. Lukin dubbed him "Pigeon" because he was small and ran fast. In his teens, he was initiated into the law of the Bunuba. At the age of 15 he returned to his traditional land for initiation and learnt to hunt. In 1889 he and a man called Ellemarra were captured by police, chained together and made to walk to Derby, where they were charged with killing sheep. Jandamarra won his freedom by agreeing to look after the police horses, and became popular. About a year later he returned to Lennard River to work as a stockman, and then to his traditional land, where he was said to have violated Bunuba law, after which he moved to Lillimooloora station to escape punishment according to tribal law.

When Jandamarra's close friend, an English stockman named Bill Richardson, joined the police force in the 1894, Jandamarra was employed as his native tracker at the police outpost in the abandoned Lillimooloora homestead. Unusually for the time, Jandamarra was treated as an equal and the pair gained a reputation as the "most outstanding" team in the police force at that time.

Aboriginal people were spearing the settlers' stock, an effective form of resistance. Eventually, Jandamarra was ordered to track down and take captive a group of Bunuba men at Lillimooloora Station. There, fellow tribesman Ellemarra and the other captives, who included relatives of Jandamarra, said that he had obligations to his people, having escaped traditional punishment. They also told him about a new policeman who had been killing Aboriginal people, and encroaching British settlers. The new policeman was British-born Sub-Inspector Overand Drewry, who played a major part in hunting down and massacring hundreds of Bunuba and other Aboriginal people in the 1890s. Jandamarra chose to shoot and kill Richardson while he slept, releasing his 16 prisoners.

=== Guerrilla war ===
On 10 November 1894, Jandamarra and some followers, who by now had formed an armed gang, attacked five white men who were driving cattle to set up a large station in the heart of Bunuba land. Two of the men were killed, with their guns and ammunition captured. On 16 November 1894, the police and Jandamarra's band of 50 warriors faced the police in an eight-hour standoff at Windjana Gorge (Bandiln͟gan), a sacred location in Bunuba culture. Ellemarra died in the conflict, but Jandamarra escaped with non-lethal wounds. Consequently, Western Australia's first Premier, John Forrest, ordered the rebellion crushed. Police attacked camps around Fitzroy Crossing, killing some Aboriginal people purely on suspicion that they had ties to Jandamarra's band, during a period of "discretionary powers". According to Pedersen and Woorunmurra, "The police offensive in the aftermath of Jandamarra's inspired rebellion was the most sustained slaughter of Aboriginal people in Western Australia's history". The official police figure of 84 shot dead between November 1894 and March 1895 was "unquestionably... just a fraction of those who died".

For the next three years, Jandamarra led a guerrilla war against police and British settlers. His hit and run tactics and his vanishing tricks became almost mythical. In one famous incident, a police patrol followed him to his hideout at the entrance to Tunnel Creek in the Napier Range, only for Jandamarra to mysteriously disappear, through the system of tunnels in the mountains. Jandamarra's mother Jinny, his brother Barney, and his wife Mayannie (who had previously also had a sexual relationship with Robinson), travelled with him, along with a non-Bunuba man known as Captain, and several young women. The women would act as effective sentinels, warning of approaching police patrols.

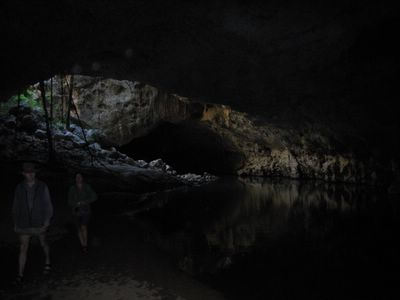
Tunnel Creek, Jandamarra's refuge, showing the collapsed centre section, West Kimberley

Jandamarra was held in awe by other Aboriginal people, who believed he was immortal, his body simply a physical manifestation of a spirit that resided in a water soak near Tunnel Creek. It was believed that only an Aboriginal person with similar mystical powers could kill him. Police chasing Jandamarra were also in awe at his ability to cross the rugged ranges with no effect on his bare feet, despite their boots being cut to shreds by the sharp rocks. In the next couple of years the gang raided the police and a white homestead.

Micki, or Minko Mick, an Aboriginal tracker also reputed to possess magical powers, was not a Bunuba tribesman and did not fear Jandamarra. He tracked Jandamarra down and shot him dead at Tunnel Creek on 1 April 1897. The white troopers cut off Jandamarra's head as proof that he was dead and it was preserved and sent to a firearms company in England where it was used as an example of the effectiveness of the company's firearms. The head of another Bunuba man was labelled as Jandamarra and put on public display in Perth. His body was buried by his family at the Napier Range where it was placed inside a boab tree.

== Legacy ==
Jandamarra's life has been the subject of two novels, Ion Idriess's Outlaws of the Leopold (1952) and Mudrooroo's Long Live Sandawarra (1972). Mudrooroo's novel, in counterpart to Idriess's, was written for an Indigenous audience to bring to their attention a hero of their own and cuts between the story of Jandamarra (called Sandawarra) and the contemporary story of young urbanised Sandy and his friends who are inspired by Jandamarra.

The story of Jandamarra, put down in writing by Howard Pedersen, was the subject of the 1996 Western Australian Premier's Book Award-winning history, Jandamarra and the Bunuba Resistance (1995).

A play titled Jandamarra was produced by the Black Swan Theatre Company in 2008.

Jandamarra's story is told in episode 5 of the 2008 TV series First Australians.

Paul Kelly's song "Pidgeon/Jandamarra" is written from the perspective of a fictional police officer hunting down Jandamarra. In 2010, singer/songwriter Neil Higgins wrote and recorded "Jandamarra's War", a song that reflects the brutality and harsh treatment of the Bunuba people in the region. This song was released in late 2016 as part of a full album.

Jandamarra's War, a documentary about his life, was made by the Australian Broadcasting Corporation and Indigenous independent production company Wawili Pitjas in 2011.

In 2014, Bunuba Cultural Enterprises worked with Steve Hawke and Paul Stanhope to create Jandamarra - Sing for the Country; Ngalanyba Muwayi.u, a cantata in three parts based on the stage play. It premiered at the Sydney Opera House on July 16, 17 and 18 2014 with the Sydney Symphony Orchestra, Gondwana Choirs, the Yilimbirri Ensemble, and several Bunuba actors. It was performed again on 18 October 2019 with the Sydney Conservatorium of Music.

A fictionalised Jandamarra is a minor character in Lucas Hanson's 2023 novel Manistee Blood.

The ruins of the Lillimulura Police Station are a few kilometres south of Windjana Gorge on the road to Tunnel Creek. Both Windjana Gorge and Tunnel Creek are popular tourist attractions.

== See also ==
- Australian frontier wars
- List of Indigenous Australian historical figures
- Musquito, a warrior of the Gai-Mariagal clan
- Pemulwuy, a warrior and resistance leader of the Bidjigal clan of the Eora people, in the area around Sydney
- Tunnerminnerwait, an Australian Aboriginal resistance fighter and Parperloihener clansman from Tasmania
- Windradyne, a warrior and resistance leader of the Wiradjuri nation
- Yagan, a warrior and resistance leader of the Noongar tribe, in what is now the area around Perth, Western Australia
