= Hey Nonny Nonny =

"Hey Nonny Nonny" may refer to:

- "Hey nonny nonny" or variations, a nonsense refrain popular in English music during the Elizabethan era
- Hey Nonny Nonny!, a 1932 American musical with music by William C. K. Irwin and lyrics by Michael H. Cleary and others
- "Hey Nonny Nonny", a song by Violent Femmes from the 1991 album Why Do Birds Sing?
- "Hey Nonny Nonny", a 2012 episode of the American sitcom Best Friends Forever
