= Tunnel Creek =

River in Western Australia

Coordinates: 17°35′27″S 124°58′45″E

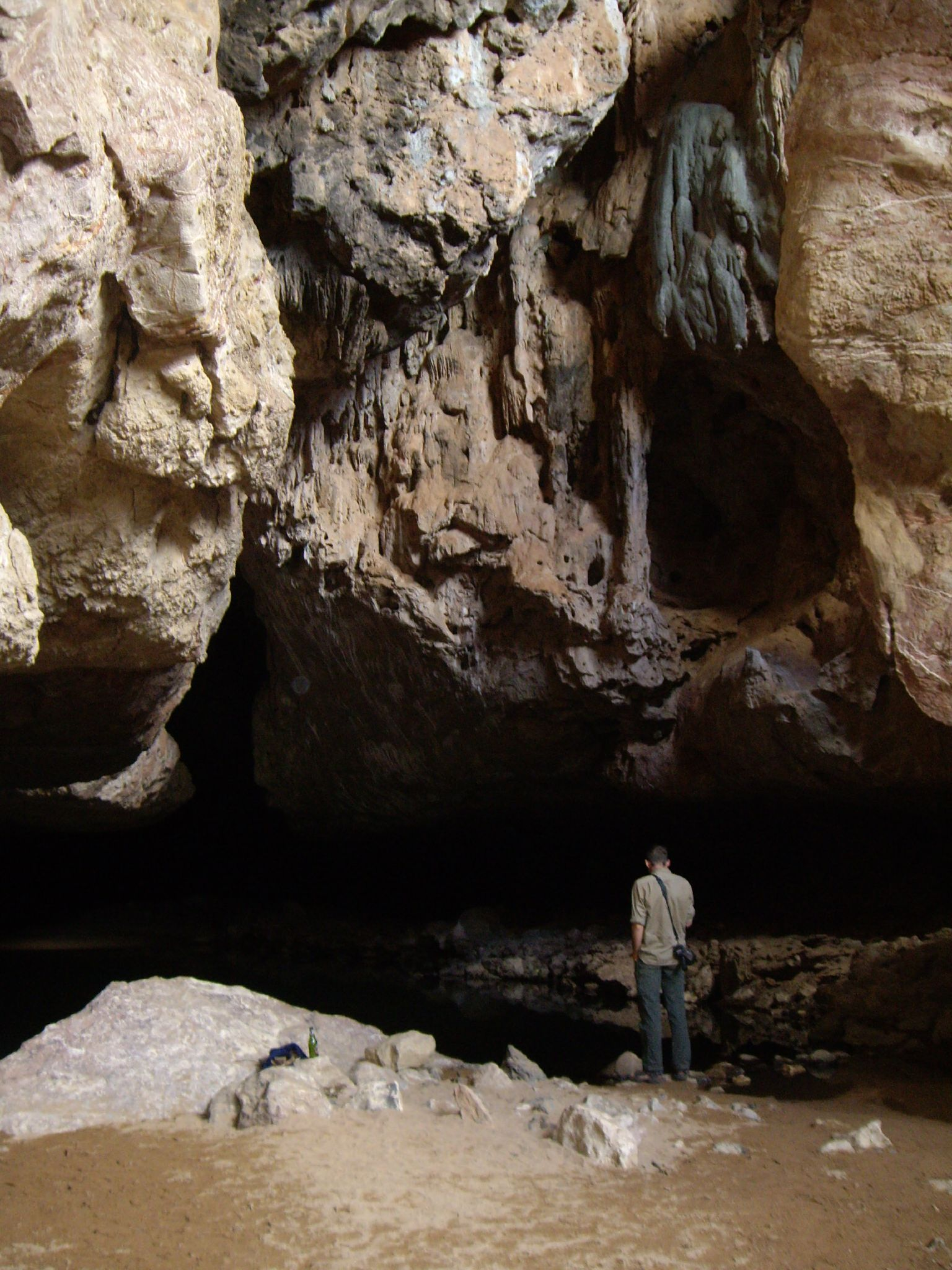
Tunnel Creek in the Kimberley region of Western Australia

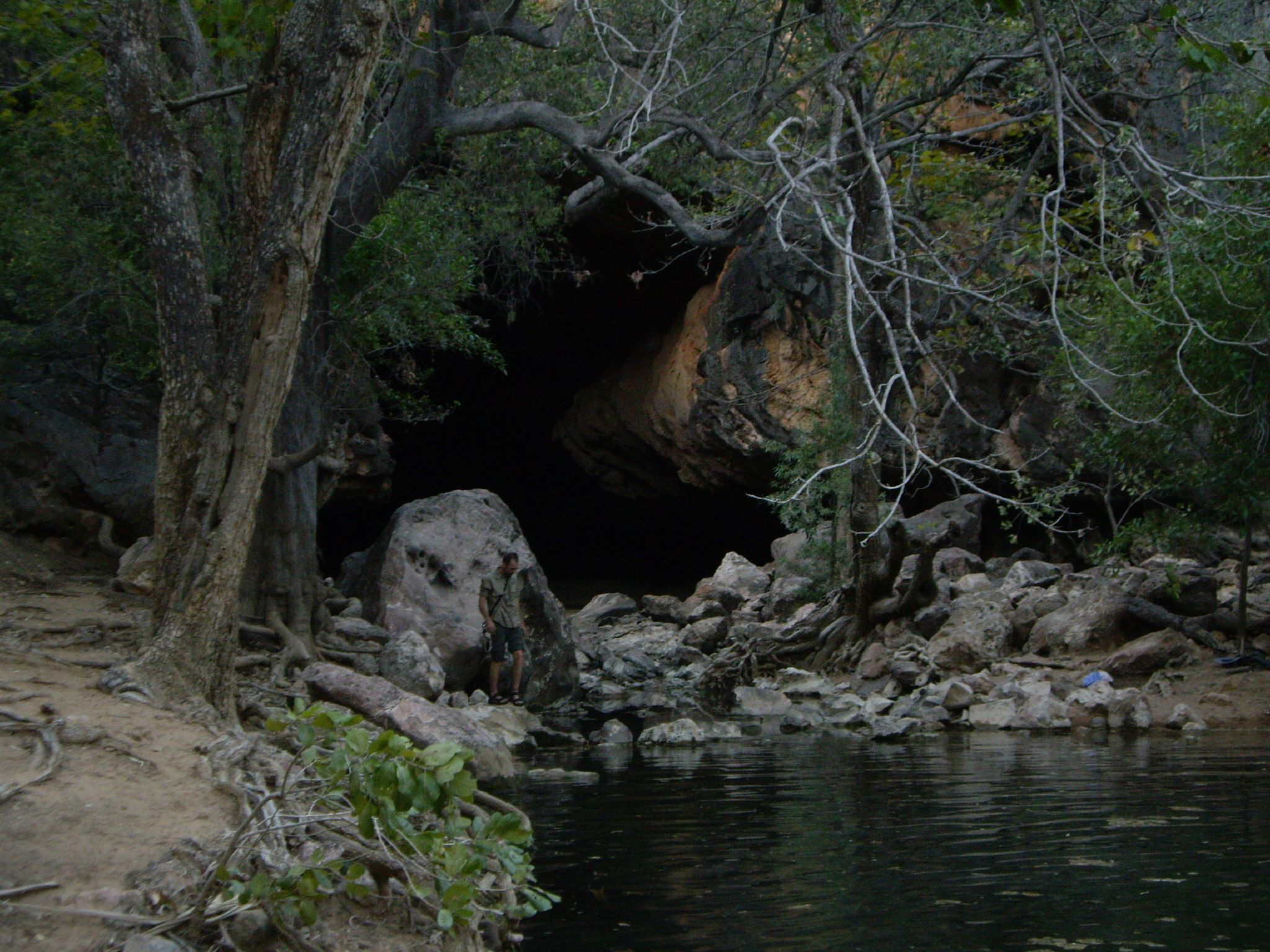

Tunnel Creek is a creek located within the grounds of Tunnel Creek National Park in the Kimberley region of Western Australia. Along with Geikie Gorge and Windjana Gorge, Tunnel Creek is part of an ancient barrier reef that developed during the Devonian Period. Tunnel Creek is located 63 kilometres from the Great Northern Highway, between Derby and Fitzroy Crossing, and was created by waters from a creek that cut a 750-metre tunnel through the reef. The tunnel is 15 metres wide and up to 12 metres high. Tunnel Creek was also the hideout for the Bunuba man Jandamarra, also known as Pigeon, who was killed there by police in 1897.

The yellow-lipped cave bat, species Vespadelus douglasorum, was first collected at this location.

== See also ==
- Gibb River Road
