= Napier Range =

Mountain range in Western Australia's Kimberley region

Coordinates: 17°18′S 124°45′E

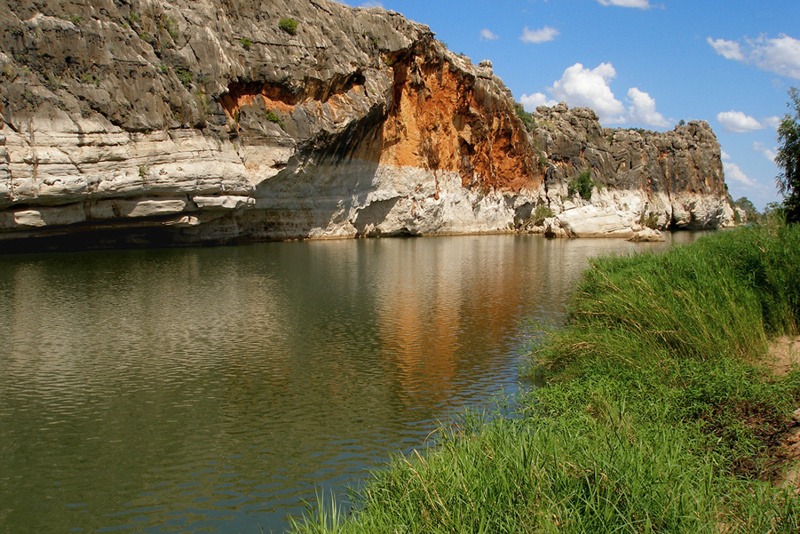
Danggu (Geikie) Gorge in the Napier Range, 2007

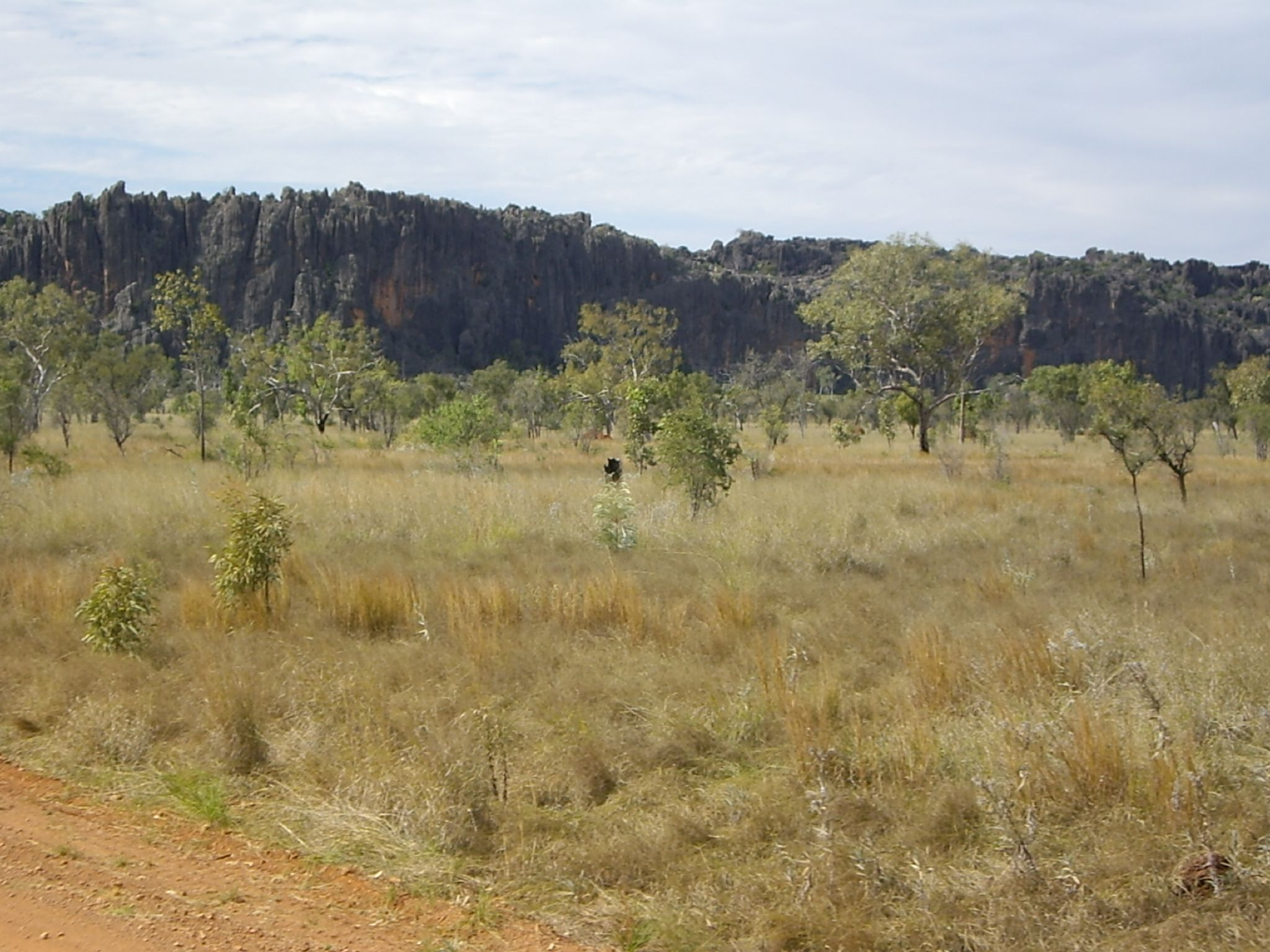
Windjana Gorge in the Napier Range

The Napier Ranges are located in the Kimberley region of Western Australia. The range is south of and runs parallel to the Wunaamin-Miliwundi Ranges (formerly King Leopold Ranges).

The majority of the Kimberley is composed of sandstone but the Napier Range is mostly made from heavily eroded limestone, or karst, with the ridges composed of an ancient Devonian reef system.

They feature the impressive Windjana Gorge and Tunnel Creek and Geikie Gorge that were formed over 350 million years ago as part of the same limestone reef.

The Fitzroy River cuts through the range at Geikie Gorge, while the Lennard River is responsible for the formation of Windjana Gorge. The Barker River also carved Barker gorge through the range.

The highest point in the Napier Range is Mount Behm that is 325 metres (1,066 ft) above sea level.

The ranges were made famous by Jandamarra, who was the subject of a massive police hunt and caused the construction of the Lillimilura police outpost which is on the southern side of the ranges approximately four kilometres from Windjana.

Some small deposits of copper and lead have been discovered in the Range but no active mine sites exist within the area.

A major expedition was carried out through the Range in 1988 by the Royal Geographical Society and the Linnaean Society involving 30 scientists. The scientists were studying the biology and geomorphology of the Range.
