= Windjana Gorge =

Gorge in Kimberley region of Western Australia

- Bandiln͟gan
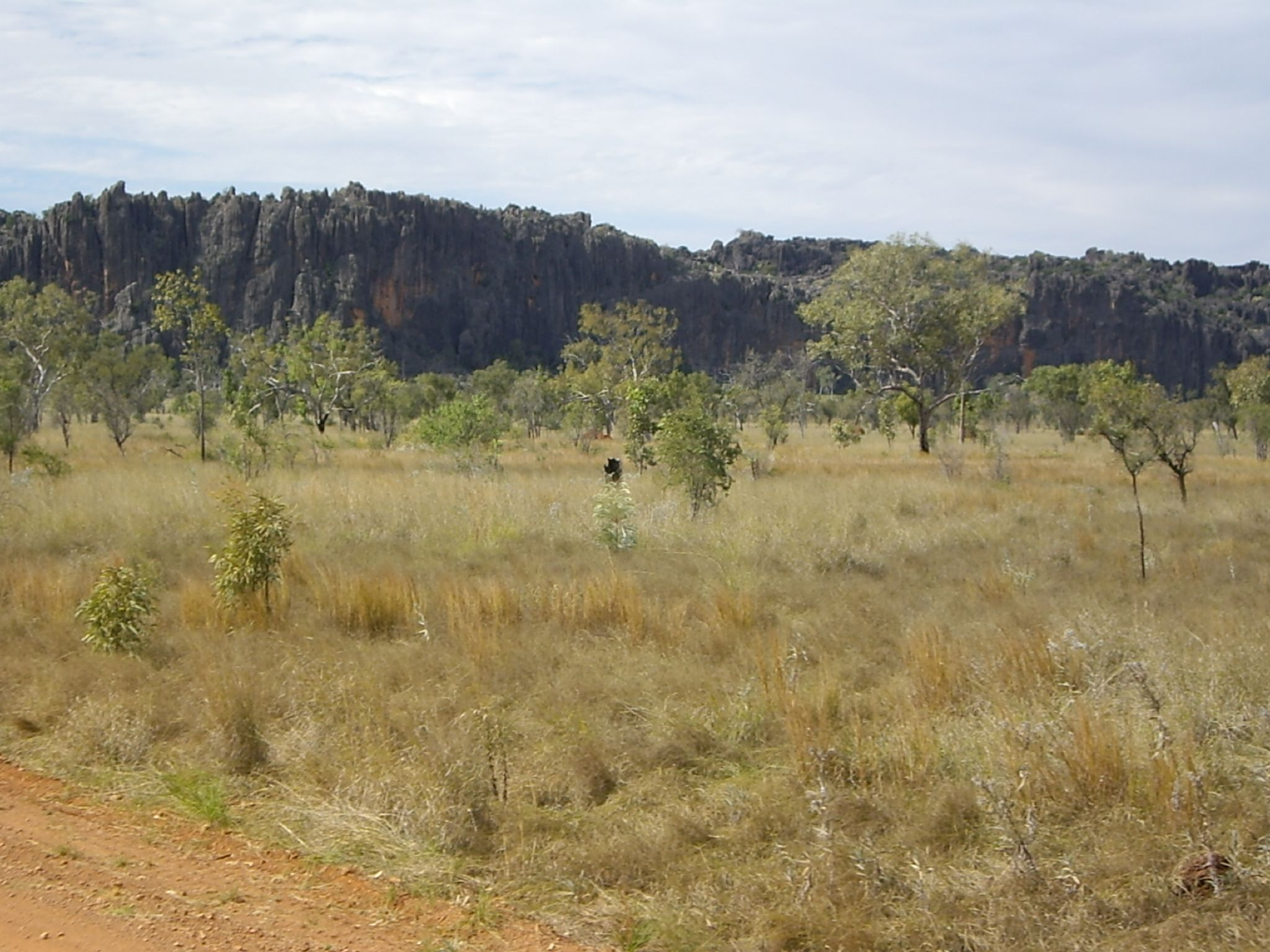
- Windjana Gorge

- Location within Western Australia

Geography
- Coordinates: 17°24′32″S 124°57′28″E
- Interactive map of Windjana Gorge

Windjana Gorge, also known as Bandiln͟gan, is a gorge in the Kimberley region of Western Australia. It is located within the Windjana Gorge National Park.

The gorge was formed by the Lennard River having eroded away a 3.5 kilometres (2 mi) section of the Napier Range. The range was formed over 300 million years ago and is composed of Devonian limestone. The gorge is over 100m wide and the walls are between 30 metres (98 ft) and 10 metres (33 ft) in height.

The area is a popular tourist destination and can be easily hiked through in the dry season. The gorge has permanent waterholes and supports a habitat of monsoonal vegetation. Freshwater crocodiles are known to frequent the area.

Travellers are able to see fossils of shells and other marine creatures on some of the rock walls.

== History ==
The locale is prominent in the recent history of the Bunuba people of the Kimberly region. In the 1890s, the Bunuba warriors Jandamarra and Ellemarra led an armed insurrection. In late 1894, a posse of around 30 heavily armed police and settlers attacked Jandamarra and his followers in Windjana Gorge. Ellemarra was killed; Jandamarra was wounded but escaped. Over his period of around four months, police were given "discretionary powers" to shoot Bunuba people, and many were massacred, including women and children.
