= Alison Lester =

Australian writer and illustrator

Alison Lester AM
- Born: Alison Jean Lester; 17 November 1952 (age 73); Foster, Victoria, Australia
- Occupations: Writer, illustrator
- Writing career
- Subject: Children's picture books
- Notable awards: Dromkeen Medal 2016

Alison Jean Lester AM (born 17 November 1952) is an Australian author and illustrator who has published over 25 children's picture books and two young adult novels — The Quicksand Pony and The Snow Pony. In 2005 Lester won the Children's Book of the Year Award: Picture Book for her children's book, Are We There Yet?: A Journey Around Australia. Her books have been published worldwide.

== Early years and education ==
Alison Lester was born in Foster, Victoria, Australia. She grew up on a farm overlooking the sea. She was educated at St Margaret's School in Berwick, Victoria, where she stayed as a boarder. She achieved a higher diploma in teaching at the Melbourne Teachers' College, where she trained as a secondary arts and crafts teacher.

== Career ==
Lester taught for a while before starting a family and writing. She was also an illustrator for 5 years. Her first book was published in 1986.

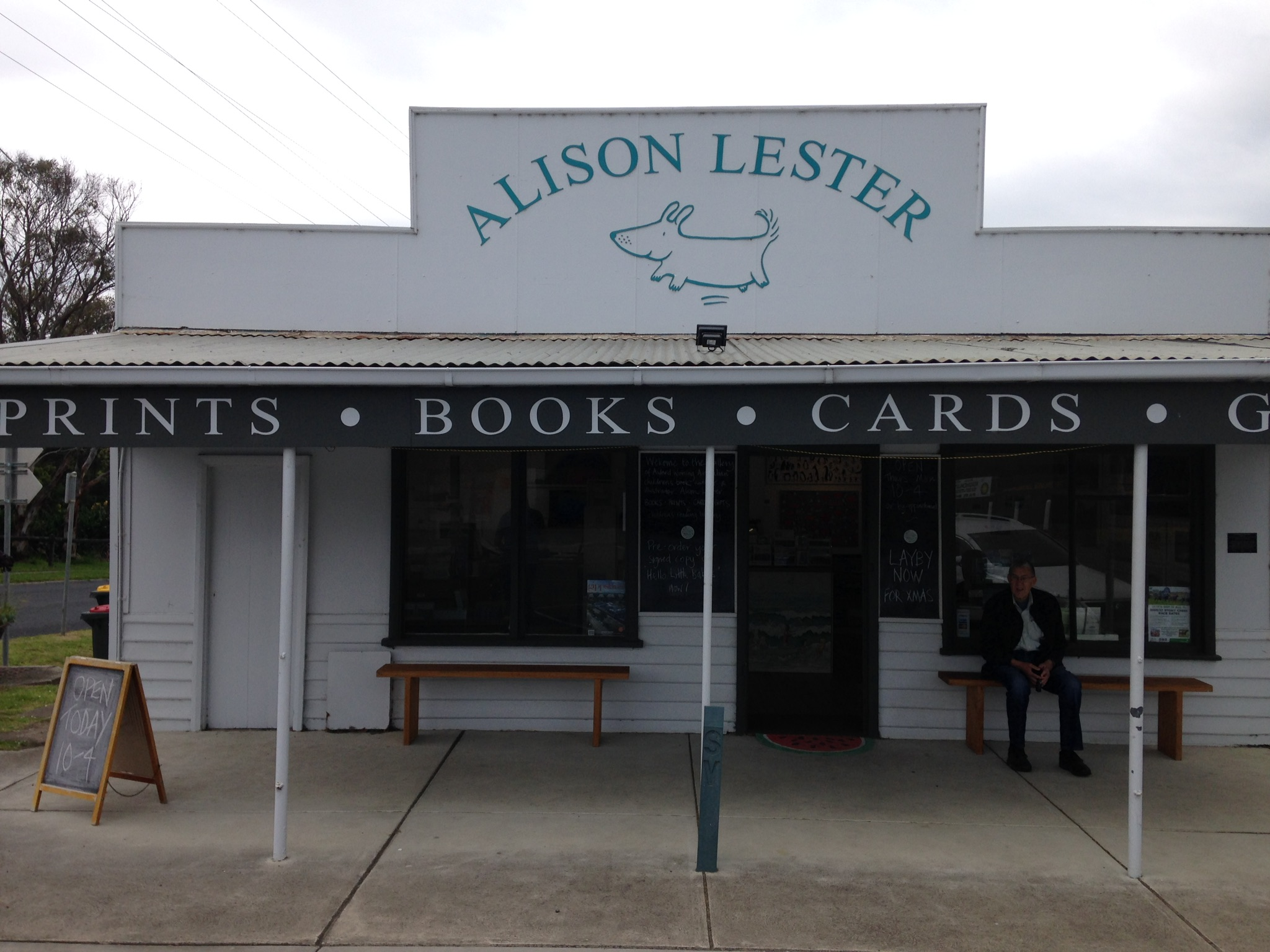
Alison Lester gallery and bookshop, Fish Creek

Lester lives and works in South Gippsland, Victoria. She has a gallery and bookshop in Fish Creek.

She visits primary schools as a guest speaker. Her picture books mix imaginary worlds with everyday life, encouraging children to believe in themselves and celebrate the differences that make themselves special.

=== 1979–2008 ===
1979, began illustrating children's books

1985, wrote first book, Clive Eats Alligators

1985–2004, writing and illustrating. Exhibitions at

- Books Illustrated
- Fremantle Children's Literature Centre
- Des Bunyon Gallery
- Dromkeen
- Season's Gallery
- McClelland Gallery

1993, guest speaker at IBBY conference, Manila

1996, received Writers Project Grant from the Australia Council to research the Spanish Riding school in Vienna

1999, writer in residence at Tanglin Trust School, Singapore

2001, guest speaker at Story Lines Festival, Auckland

2002, visiting author at the Bologna Book Fair, Italy, sponsored by the Australia Council

2004, guest speaker, [Simmons College], Boston, United States

2004, visiting author to Seoul, [Korea] for Children's Book Week

2004, visiting author, schools in [Tokyo]

2005, traveled to Antarctica as an Australian Antarctic Arts Fellow for the Kids Antarctic Art project.

2005, workshops and exhibition of Are We There Yet? in Japan as part of the Asialink literature touring program with the Aichi expo

2005, photographer on tourist ship to Ross Sea region of Antarctica

2006, Are We There Yet? illustrations exhibited in Taipei

2006, first painting for the Kid's Antarctic Art project exhibited at the Tasmanian Museum and Art Gallery

2007, visual artist on two voyages to Peninsula region of Antarctica.

2007, Kid's Antarctic Art exhibition opens at Tasmanian Museum and Art Gallery

2007, photographer and writer on voyage around Spitsbergen in the Arctic.

2008, Kids Antarctic Art exhibited at Melbournestyle, South Melbourne, featuring selected works as larger canvasses.

== Books ==
Lester has written a series of picture books about seven children and their favourite things. This series of books is very popular among young children. The books have been published in many different languages. The titles are: When Frank Was Four, Tessa Snaps Snakes, Rosie Sips Spiders, Clive Eats Aligators, Ernie Dances To The Didgeridoo and Celeste Sails to Spain.

Some of her other well known books include; Imagine, The Journey Home, Kissed by the Moon and Noni the Pony. Both The Quicksand Pony and The Snow Pony became best-sellers in Australia.

Her 1990 best-seller, Magic Beach, was adapted as an animated film by Robert Connolly in 2024.

== Awards and recognition ==
Lester's books have received many honours. Her picture book, Clive Eats Alligators was commended in the Australian Picture Book of the Year Awards 1986, Ernie Dances to the Didgeridoo was short-listed in 2000 for the same award and her experience-based picture book, The Journey Home, was honoured by the judges in 1990. Her novel, The Quicksand Pony, was named a CBCA Notable Book in 1997.

- Children's Book of the Year Award: Picture Book for Are We There Yet? A Journey Around Australia in 2005.
- Inaugural Australian Children's Laureate for Australian Children's Literature Alliance from 2011 to 2013.
- Awarded the Dromkeen Medal in 2016.
- Winner of the 2018 Melbourne Prize for Literature valued at $60,000.
- Appointed a Member of the Order of Australia (AM) in the 2019 Australia Day Honours.
- Children's Book of the Year Award: Early Childhood for Trick's Bad Day in 2019.
- Nominated for the 2027 Astrid Lindgren Memorial Award in the illustrator and author categories.
