= Danggu Gorge National Park =

National park in Kimberley region of Western Australia

Danggu (Geikie) Gorge National Park
- IUCN category II (national park)
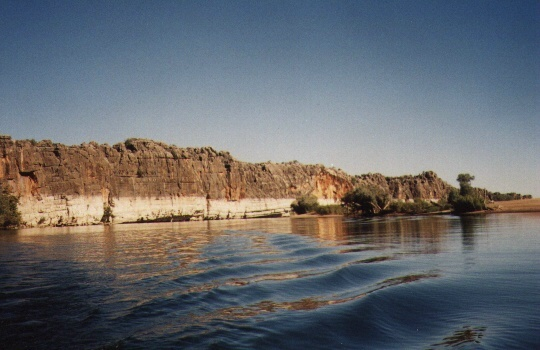
- Danggu Gorge

- Location within Western Australia
- Location: Western Australia
- Nearest city: Fitzroy Crossing
- Coordinates: 18°04′38″S 125°42′49″E
- Area: 31.36 km^{2} (12.11 sq mi)
- Established: 1967
- Governing body: Department of Environment and Conservation; Darlngunaya Aboriginal Corporation
- Website: Official website

Danggu (Geikie) Gorge National Park is a national park in the Kimberley region of Western Australia, 1,837 kilometres (1,141 mi) (great-circle distance) northeast of Perth and approximately 420 km (261 mi) east of Broome by road.

As of January 2024 it is closed owing to damage caused by flooding of the Fitzroy River in 2023.

== Dan͟ggu Geikie Gorge ==
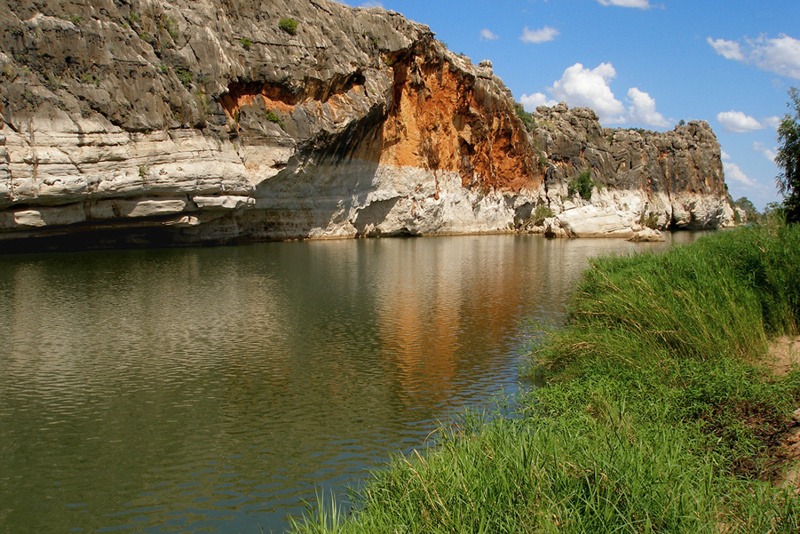
Danggu Gorge National Park, Fitzroy River, 2007

Dan͟ggu Geikie Gorge (18.0733°S 125.7212°E), formerly Geikie Gorge, is a feature of the Napier Range located within the National Park, 20 kilometres (12 mi) from Fitzroy Crossing. It is believed to be one of the best-known and most easily accessed gorges in the region.

Along with Tunnel Creek and Windjana Gorge, Geikie Gorge is part of an ancient barrier reef that developed during the Devonian Period. The walls of the gorge are 30 m (98 ft) high. The 8-kilometre (5.0 mi) gorge was created by the flowing waters of the Fitzroy River, which still flows through the region. Freshwater crocodiles, Leichhardt's sawfish and coach-whip stingrays inhabit the river. The level of the river in the wet season can rise by up to 16.5 metres (54 ft), and the flood level can be clearly seen on the walls where the abrasive action of the floodwaters on the limestone has scoured the surface white.

== Geology ==
The limestone was originally a reef formed not by corals but by algae and lime-secreting organisms that are now extinct. The reef was formed in the Devonian period when the receding waters allowed the organisms to build a reef up to 2 km (1 mi) thick. The remains of the reef now stand as the limestone range that wind across the countryside up to 100 m (330 ft) above the plains. Fossils from the Devonian can be found within the limestone strata.

== History ==
The gorge was originally named in honour of Sir Archibald Geikie, the Director General of Geological Survey for Great Britain and Ireland when it was named in 1883. Known by local Bunuba people as Darngku or as it is more usually spelt, Danggu, the gorge was later (sometime before June 2019) renamed Dan͟ggu Geikie Gorge. Danggu means "the area where the water is very deep under the cave" in the Bunuba language.

In 2023, many of the park's facilities were damaged by heavy flooding when the Fitzroy River rose 15 m (49 ft), and the river itself was changed permanently in some places. The park had to be closed, and a recovery plan has been undertaken, with hopes to reopen the park sometime in 2024.

== Park access and facilities ==
Danggu Geikie Gorge National Park is part of the Balili (Devonian Reef) Conservation Park.

It lies around 1,837 kilometres (1,141 mi) (great-circle distance) northeast of Perth and approximately 420 km (261 mi) east of Broome by road.

The park is one of the most accessible in the Kimberley as it is only 20 km (12 mi) from Fitzroy Crossing and is serviced by a sealed road. No camping is allowed in the park and visitors can only enter during the day. The park has picnic shelters, barbecue areas, toilets and water available.

A 3-kilometre (2 mi) walk trail exists along the western base of the gorge walls; although the terrain is rough and uneven it does offer an excellent view. The eastern side of the gorge is closed to visitors as it is a nature preserve. Tour boats also operate in the gorge and a boat ramp is available for the public to use. Hours of use of the boat ramp are restricted to outside of boat tour times.

However, as of January 2024, the park is closed owing to flood damage sustained in 2023.

== Flora and fauna ==
The river water sustains an abundance of life, including barramundi, sawfish and freshwater crocodiles, all of which can be found in the gorge.

The vegetation that fringes the river bank includes river gums, freshwater mangroves, pandanus, cadjeput and native figs. Dense banks of reeds are also found along the banks. The flora provides a suitable habitat for a range of fauna, including fruit bats, lilac-crowned wren, reed warbler and the great bowerbird.

== See also ==
- Protected areas of Western Australia
