= Broome Pearling Lugger Pidgin =

Pidgin spoken in Western Australia

- Region: Broome, Western Australia
- Native speakers: None; L2 speakers: 40 (no date)
- Language family: Malay-based creole: Eastern Indonesia Malay; Kupang Malay?; Broome Pearling Lugger Pidgin

Language codes
- ISO 639-3: bpl
- Glottolog: broo1238
- AIATSIS: P3

Broome Pearling Lugger Pidgin is a pidgin that sprang up in Broome, Western Australia in the early 20th century to facilitate communication between the various groups working in the pearling industry there—Japanese, Malays, Torres Strait Islanders, Koepangers, Hakka Chinese, Filipinos, Sri Lankans of Sinhalese and Tamil descent, a small number of Koreans, and local Indigenous Australians, mainly of the Bardi people but also Nyulnyul, Jabirr Jabirr, Jukun, Yawuru and Karajarri people. The name derives from the boats used for pearling, known as pearling luggers.

Its words come primarily from the Malay language (specifically Kupang Malay), but it also took some words and grammatical features from Hakka, Japanese, English (through the Australian Aboriginal Pidgin English), and the local Australian Aboriginal languages.

For example, the following sentence contains a Malay verb and Japanese grammatical particles, with the remaining words coming from English:

Chirikurok	-kaa	hokurok	-kaa	peke	kriki.
English: "three o'clock"	Japanese: "or"	English: "four o'clock"	Japanese: "or"	Malay: "go"	English: "creek"
"We will enter the creek at three or four o'clock."

Broome Pearling Lugger Pidgin is no longer in active use, but some words and phrases that originated in the pidgin are still used by younger generations of Asian-Aboriginals as a marker of ethnic isolationism.

== See also ==
- Pearling in Western Australia
