= Broome Cable House =

Heritage building in Broome, Western Australia

Broome Cable House / Broome Court House
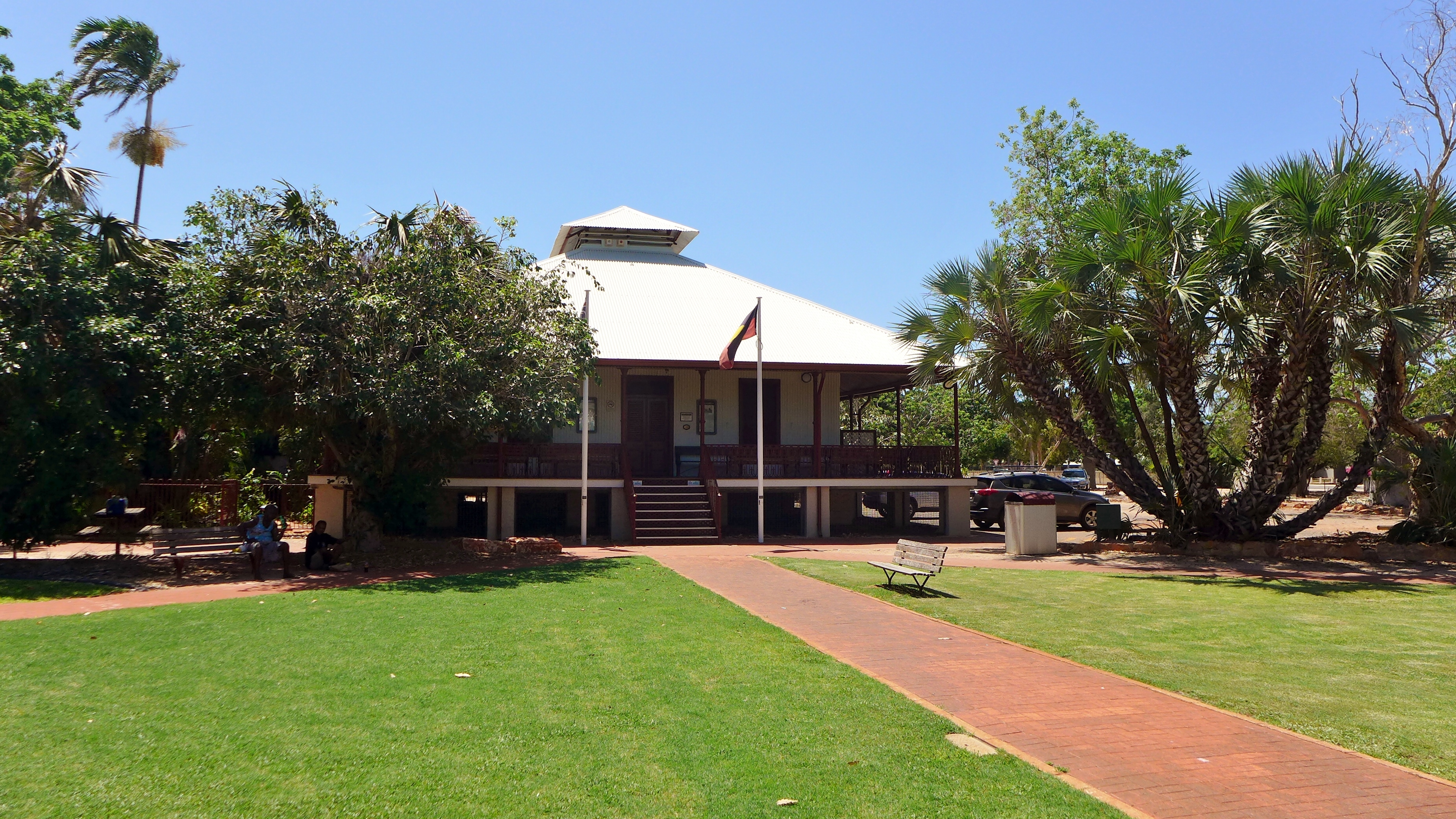
- The building and grounds in 2019

- Location within Western Australia
- 17°57′25″S 122°14′25″E
- Location: 8 Hamersley Street; Broome WA 6725

History
- Built: 1889

Site notes
- Governing body: Government of Western Australia

Western Australia Heritage Register
- Type: State Registered Place
- Designated: 28 August 2001
- Reference no.: 296

The Broome Cable House opened on 9 April 1889 and is now known as the Broome Court House. Constructed in 1879, the facility was used as a cable station until March 1914. It is listed on the Western Australia State Heritage Register.

The building was occupied by November 1889 and included rooms for the cable station and separate living quarters. Vegetable gardens were developed around the building and on the adjacent lot, for use in cooking which was carried out in a separate kitchen building. The kitchen has been demolished but the floor slab remains and is now used for the toilet block and store.

The cable station had a tennis court, a billiard room, and servants to look after the British staff and their guests. It was thus an elegant and attractive place that featured prominently in the early social life of the town.

Cable Beach, where the cable reached land is named after this cable that connected Java to the cable station.

== Construction of cable station ==
In the late 1880s, the small, former colony settlement of Broome located on Roebuck Bay in the north of Western Australia consisted of two stores and a few scattered houses. It had no road or rail connection to the south of the Colony and depended on limited sea transport for its supplies and communication. It was not until 1872 that Australia was connected overseas by submarine telegraphic cable, when a cable was laid from Banjoewangie in Java to Darwin. A second cable, paralleling the first, was laid in 1880. Due to frequent breaks in the cable as a result of submarine volcanic activity, there arose an urgent need to lay a third cable, away from the seismic zone.

In February 1889, a submarine telegraph cable was laid by cable laying ship CS Seine to connect Banjoewangie, Java and Australia and was landed on what is today known as Cable Beach.

Between 3 and 9 March 1889, the prefabricated ironwork and timber making up the building for the cable station was transported to Broome as deck cargo on the CS Seine. Due to depth limitations in Roebuck Bay the material was gradually offloaded onto a smaller pearling vessel, which was being sheltered in Broome over the cyclone season.

It was then taken up the tidal creek, Dampier Creek and thrown overboard at high tide. The sections were then retrieved at low tide, dragged manually up the creek, over the mud and stored on the beach, prior to being transported to the station site and erected on the land now bounded by Frederick, Hamersley, Stewart and Weld Streets.

A comment in the engineer's report stated that "it seemed a pity to treat polished teak in this way, but no other method was practicable and no real harm was done though the appearance suffered a little." The Chinese people who had collected and loaded the teak in Singapore travelled with it, to erect the house, and it was those labourers who had to cart everything across the mudflats.

== Connection between Cable House and cable station ==
The underground cable from the Cable House to the cable station was laid on the southern side of MacPherson Road, a road constructed originally for this purpose. The cable then ran down Barlee Street, entering the northwest corner of the cable station at the intersection of Frederick Street and Weld Street. Only a short section of MacPherson Road now remains, being the street that now leads into the Broome International Airport. Barlee Street no longer exists.

== History of the building ==
- Cable Station, April 1889 to March 1914
- Australian Army, July 1914 to 1918
- Court House, 6 September 1921 to present

The building was placed on the Western Australian State Register of Heritage Places in 2001.

== Cable company operations ==
On 9 April 1889 the first paid telegram was sent to London by Mr E Keane of Perth. Many employees of the Eastern Extension, Australasia and China Telegraph Company Limited were recruited at a young age, 15 to 16 years. They were given rigorous training in cable telegraphy and on the satisfactory completion of a probationary period were liable to be transferred to any of the company's worldwide network of cable stations and ships. The company set high standards of proficiency and behaviour and failure to maintain them could lead to dismissal. This was made especially difficult given the moral standards of the time and the harsh tropical heat in north west Australia. But no matter how difficult the conditions, many operators stayed with the cable service all their working lives.

== The end of the Broome cable station ==
In 1914 the Broome cable station was taken out of service after being in operation for 25 years when the Eastern Extension, Australasia and China Telegraph Company Limited built a new station at Cottesloe (near Perth, WA) with a cable link to Africa via the Cocos Islands.

It served this purpose until March 1914, operating for 25 years until closure. Most cables were subsequently recovered.

The year 1914 was particularly bad for Broome because the outbreak of World War I ruined the European market for pearl shell. Many of the men from the town enlisted and there were fears that the German SMS Emden would raid Broome and destroy the local wireless station (built in 1913 for ship-to-shore communication).

There was little demand for the property when conditions returned to normal after the war; the buildings the government used for justice purposes were no longer adequate and the cable station was acquired for conversion to a courthouse, which opened on 6 September 1921.

The cable station was purchased from the telegraph company for 3000 pounds and, after a further expenditure of 1100 pounds, converted into a court house.

The size and fabric of the station were not changed and it stands today in 3 acres of landscaped tropical gardens, a magnificent iron and timber building, as an excellent example of 19th century Colonial Architecture.

== Current use ==
The building is currently used as a court house by the Western Australian Department Of Justice, and the grounds are used for community markets every Saturday during the wet season and every Saturday and Sunday during the dry (tourist season).

In June 2015, the Attorney-General of Western Australia, Michael Mischin, said that the building was elderly and did not meet contemporary standards for a courthouse. He also said that there were plans to replace the building as a courthouse, but a departmental spokesman said that a site for the replacement still needed to be found, before funding could be allocated for the replacement project.

In early 2024, a judge presiding over a jury trial at the building had vacate the trial after the jury panel saw the accused being escorted in handcuffs from the lock-up area, about 100 m (330 ft) away. The judge said that this was the "third time" such an incident had happened.

A lawyer who had been one of the defence lawyers at the hearing later told ABC News that the building's function as a courtroom was impractical. Other issues included poor acoustics and a lack of privacy. "We haven't got facilities to take instructions. There's no way around it because it's a standalone building, which is built for a completely different purpose," he said.

When ABC News questioned a spokesperson for the Department of Justice in mid-2024 about the need for a new courthouse, the spokesperson said the Broome Court House had been flagged as a site to be modernised. Additionally, security issues had been raised with the Attorney-General, John Quigley, who had asked the department to consider and provide a briefing to government on the options available to address those issues.

== See also ==
- Australian Overland Telegraph Line
