= Pearling in Western Australia =

Local aquaculture industry

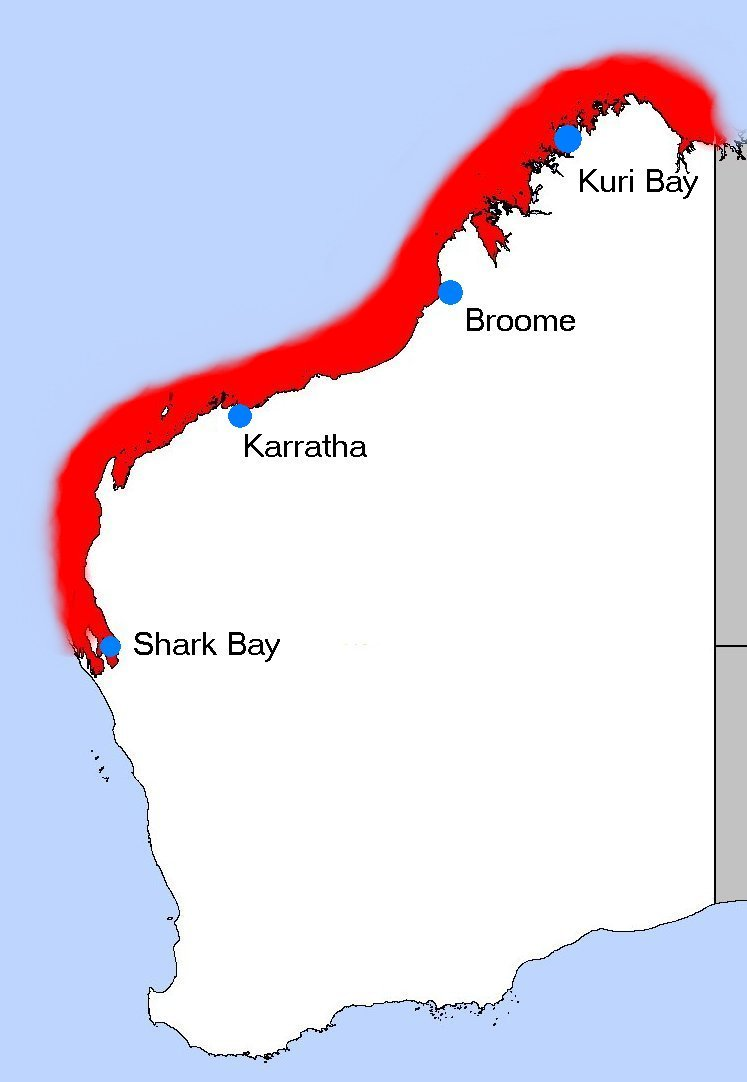
Main pearling areas in Western Australia

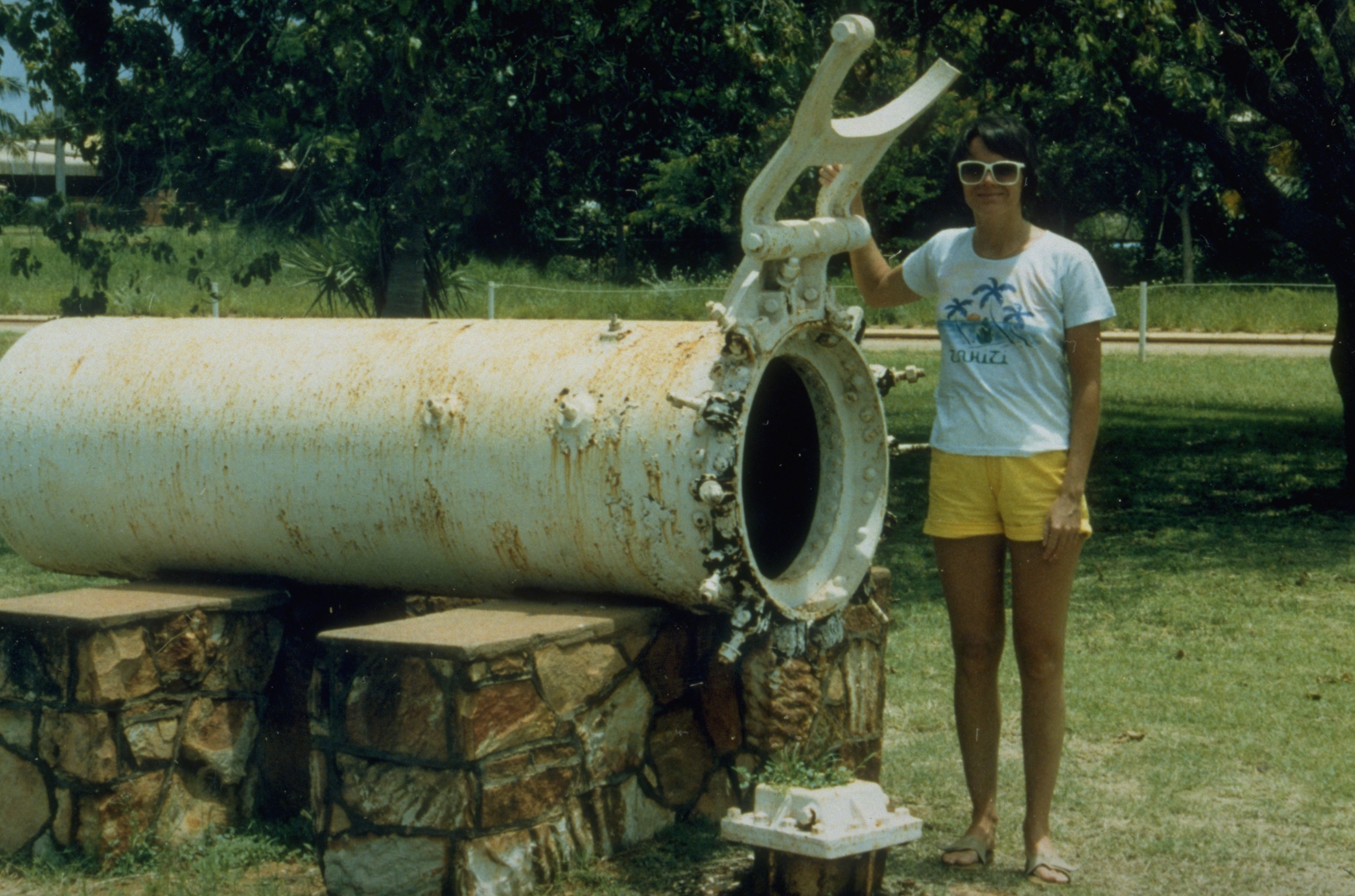
Early diving recompression chamber at Broome, used to treat the Japanese divers for decompression sickness.

Pearling in Western Australia includes the harvesting and farming of both pearls and pearl shells (for mother of pearl) along the north-western coast of Western Australia.

The practice of collecting pearl shells existed well before British settlement. After settlement, Aboriginal people were used as slave labour in the emerging commercial industry, a practice known as blackbirding. After 1886, with the rise of 'hard hat' diving, Asian divers from coastal and island regions became most common, leading to the pearling industry being the sole exception to the White Australia Policy of 1901.

Pearling centred first around Nickol Bay and Exmouth Gulf and then around Broome, to become the largest in the world by 1910. The farming of cultured pearls remains an important part of the Kimberley economy, worth A$67 million in 2014 and is the second largest fisheries industry in Western Australia after rock lobster.

== History ==
=== Pre-colonial history ===
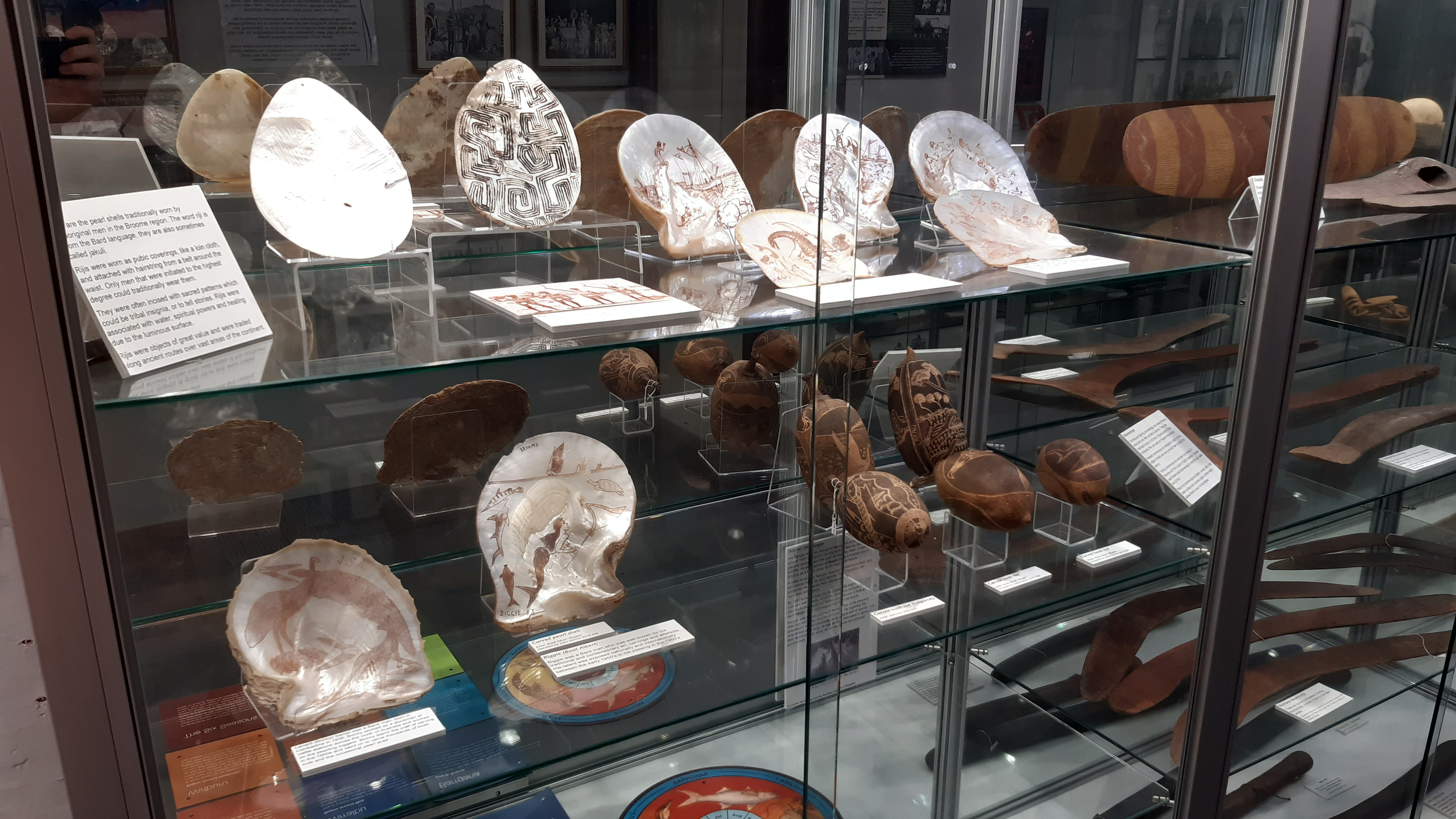
Decorated pearl shells on display in the Broome Historical Museum, which were worn by Aboriginal men in the Broome region pre-colonisation

Northern coastal dwelling Aboriginal people are known to have collected and traded pearl shell with fisherman from Sulawesi for at least 500 years. Pearl shells were also traded within Australia, with shell from the Kimberley region being found over 1,600 kilometres (1,000 mi) from their place of manufacture.

=== 1862–1868: Beginnings of British pearling industry: wading for shell ===
The explorer Francis Thomas Gregory reported Pinctada maxima on the north-west coast in his widely read journals. (Note: Gregory was not the first to report observing pearls; in 1699, the explorer William Dampier also did so.) In 1862, in the wake of Gregory's account, John Wesley Bateman sent the vessel, Flying Foam, to harvest shells. The venture proved uneconomic and it was soon abandoned.

Local pastoralists and those stranded after their planned settlements had broken down were the first to make pearling a successful enterprise. Having learnt from the local Aboriginal peoples, they harvested shells by "beach-combing or wading in the shallows at low tide," some doing so after seeing the decorative pearl shells (Riji) made by local Aboriginal people. By November 1866, two men, Tays and Hicks, assisted by some number of Aboriginal people, had collected nine tons of shell.

The success of the early pearlers spread, resulting in several vessels from Fremantle sailing to the pearling fields, with ten boats joining in the first few months of 1868. That year, it was described that the pearlers would "prowl along the coast and gather as many as can be seen at low water", while the vessels were used to transport the collected shell in sacks and bags. At the time, two or three men in a single boat could gather £80–100 over the course of one tide, representing a government servants' annual salary.

=== 1868–1883: Naked diving ===
In 1868, a transition from wading to diving took place, this was caused by the over-harvesting of the shallows. Pearlers adapted by having dinghies carry up to eight divers out and, when the divers went overboard, the leader then drifted with the divers until they found pearl beds. The leader would try to hold the dinghy in position, against the tide, or would make repeated runs over the bed.

Those with capital experimented in their methods. One example was using a larger vessel to act as a 'mother boat' to help transport and store the collected pearl at the end of the day. Due to limits on what depths naked divers could access, the pastoralist Charles Edward Broadhurst and a few other proprietors experimented with the use of 'hard hats' by professional divers. Broadhurst's initial attempts in 1968 ended in failure, with the diver "swept off his feet and strung out in the strong current, while the naked divers used the very same tides to advantage."

As early as 1869, reports of pearlers kidnapping Aboriginal people are known, leading to the government attempting to regulate the use of Aboriginal labour. In 1871 and 1873, laws were passed that banned Aboriginal women divers as well as being "designed to protect Aboriginal labor". This regulation lead to labour being sourced from the coastal regions and islands of Asia, these people were collectively referred to as 'Malay' by the government. This regulation resulted in the number of Malays employed in the industry increasing from about 50 in 1873 to 1800 in 1875. A high death rate among Malay divers prompted further regulation, including the requirement that pearlers "pay a bond of 200 florins per Malay diver which was forfeited if he died or was not returned to his home port" as well as a minimum wage. The number of "Malay divers dropped from 989 in 1875 to 9 in 1876", and the importance of Aboriginal divers (who were paid in rations) became central to the industry again.

Due to the growing number of boats and a decline in the number of Aboriginal divers due to introduced diseases (such as smallpox), in 1870, Broadhurst was given permission to allow Aboriginal convicts on Rottnest Island to 'volunteer' as divers. Five of the volunteers escaped by jumping overboard as they reached their Country in Champion Bay.

==== The Shark Bay pearling industry ====
Francis Cadell, blackbirder and explorer, operated at Wilyah Miah (Place of the Pearl) in Shark Bay during this period. Broadhurst also operated in the area and there he had success with dredging for pearl. Broadhurst collected over 200 ounces (5.7 kg) in October 1873, worth more than £5,000 at the time. The publicity surrounding their successes resulted in a virtual gold rush and the beds were soon depleted.

=== 1884–1939: Hard hat diving & Broome ===
In the mid-1890s, the pearling industry's centre had shifted from Cossack to Broome. Experimentation with hard hats had continued and their utilisation became the norm at Broome; by the end of the 1885-6 pearling season 34 of the 54 vessels there were using hard hats and in the 1887–8 season only 2 of 120 vessels continued with naked diving. With diving equipment's growing adoption, recruitment became biased towards Malays again. Additionally, Aboriginal divers quickly vanished from the industry and London-based pearlers came to dominate as most northwest pearlers could not afford the higher costs.

The mother ship system continued during this period; this now involved a large schooner operating with a fleet of pearling luggers (a type of ketch adapted to the industry and unique to it). By the early 1900s, 300 pearling luggers were found in Broome's safe harbour and in 1913 the fleet peaked at 403.

Broome's urban population grew from 121 in 1891 to over 1,000 by 1900. (Note: McCarthy gives the population of Broome to have "grown to around 1000 Europeans and twice that of non-Europeans" by the early 1900s)

==== The White Australia Policy ====
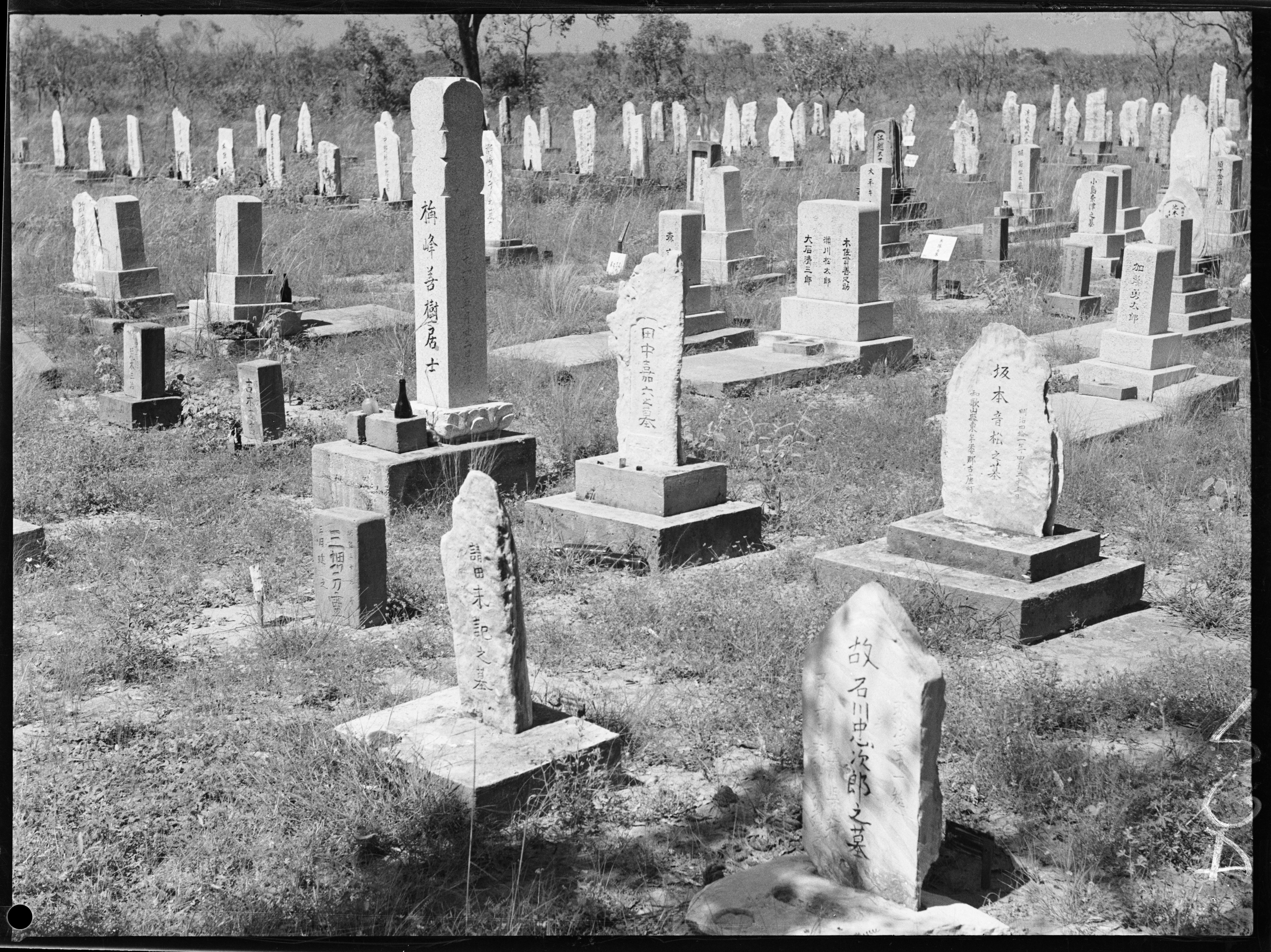

In the 1890s, Japanese divers "took over the diving side of operations", establishing themselves as the "mainstay of the hard hat pearling industry". In 1901, 943 of the 998 workers in the pearling fleet weren't white.

The industry's dependence on imported labour resulted in it resisting the Federal government's White Australia Policy of 1901. (Note: In response the government recruited 12 divers from the British Navy as pearl divers but the majority of the divers died.) The industry succeeded and became the only one exempt from the policy's provisions which prevented importing "coloured" labour. They did not however "apply the same pressure to exempt their workers from the personal restrictions of the act which prevented them from bringing their families into the country, owning businesses such as pearling luggers and staying past their employment contracts."

By 1902, most of the hard hat diving was done by Japanese divers. The Japanese soon came to also dominate the industry as owner-operators through the practice of "dummying", where a license was held "in the name of a compliant European."

=== Post WW2: indentured labour ===
After World War II, workers were brought from Malaya and Indonesia on bonds to work in the pearl shelling industry and returned to their country of origin when no longer needed. Sumatran-born Samsudin bin Katib was a pearl diver who was recruited and deployed in the Z Special Unit Commandos in the Australian Army and worked behind enemy lines. Returning to work in Broome, Samsudin protested at a 10% cut in wages and poor conditions for the migrant labourers, organising a general strike. He also applied to be allowed permanent residence, but this was against the provisions of the White Australia policy. Despite the backing of some unions and individuals, he was deported in 1948.

=== Legacy of the 19th century ===
In April 2019, the skeletons of 14 Yawuru and Karajarri people which had been sold in 1894 by a wealthy Broome pastoralist and pearler to a museum in Dresden, Germany, were brought home. The remains, which had been stored in the Grassi Museum of Ethnology in Leipzig, showed signs of head wounds and malnutrition, a reflection of the poor conditions endured by Aboriginal people forced to work on the pearl luggers.

== Pearling luggers ==
The boats used for pearling from the 1870s, known as pearling luggers, were unique to Australia. There were at least two types: the Broome or North-West lugger, and the Thursday Island or Torres Strait lugger. The styles are each adapted to their respective areas and modus operandi. Around Broome, the boats had to cope with the extreme tidal range and the shallow sandy shore, on which they had to spend extended periods lying on their sides. The Torres Strait luggers spent longer periods at sea, based around schooners as mother ships.

The design of these two types changed after the engines were developed for the boats, and over time they began to look more alike. The last of the pearling luggers were built in the 1950s, and were over 50 feet (15 m) long. They were some of the last wooden sailing vessels in commercial use in Australia.

Michael Gregg, curator of maritime history at the Western Australian Museum says there were four different types, and also pointed out that the Broome pearling lugger was not actually a lugger. The name derived from the first boats used for pearling in Australia, which were often ship's boats, and used a lugsail, and so they were called luggers. But as boats began to be designed specifically for pearling, they kept the name luggers though they stopped using lugsails, and were actually gaff-rigged ketches.

At the peak of the pearling industry, in the early 1900s, there were 350 to 400 pearling luggers operating out of Broome each year. By 2005, there were just two still afloat in Broome. In 2007, one of them, Ida Lloyd, sank off Cable Beach, and in 2015, Intombi, built in 1903, was burnt. However, as of 2019, there were still about 40 luggers of various types still afloat around Australia, and there is a collection of luggers at the Australian National Maritime Museum.

In Western Australia, preserved examples include those in the Western Australian Maritime Museum collection, including Trixen - built in Broome and used at all major pearling locations around Australia, Ancel also built in Broome, and The Galla used in Shark Bay and now privately owned anchored at Denham.

== Cultured pearls ==
Due to the prospect of an adverse reaction in the natural pearling industry, the Australian government through the Pearling Act 1922 prohibited anyone in Australia from artificially producing cultivated pearls. The Act was repealed in 1949. In 1956, a joint Japanese-Australian venture was set up at Kuri Bay, 420 kilometres (260 mi) north of Broome as a cultured pearl farm, named Pearls Proprietary Ltd. The company was owned by Male and Co, Broome Pearlers Brown and Dureau Ltd, and the Otto Gerdau Company (New York). The Japanese-owned Nippo Pearl Company handled distribution and marketing. The principal was Tokuichi Kuribayashi (1896–1982) who became highly influential following the death of Kōkichi Mikimoto (1858–1954). Mikimoto, Kuribayashi and another man, Tatsuhei Mise (1880–1924) had all been involved in the invention of cultured pearls around 1900. Kuri Bay was named after Mr Kuribayashi.

By 1981, there were five pearl farms operational: Kuri Bay, Port Smith, Cygnet Bay, and two in Broome's Roebuck Bay.

The industry today includes 19 of Australia's 20 cultured pearl farms and generates annual exports of A$200 million and employs approximately 1000 people.

== See also ==
- Blackbirding
- Slavery in Australia
- Broome Pearling Lugger Pidgin
- Mutiny on the Ethel
