= Broome Bird Observatory =

Coordinates: 17.9750°S 122.3444°E

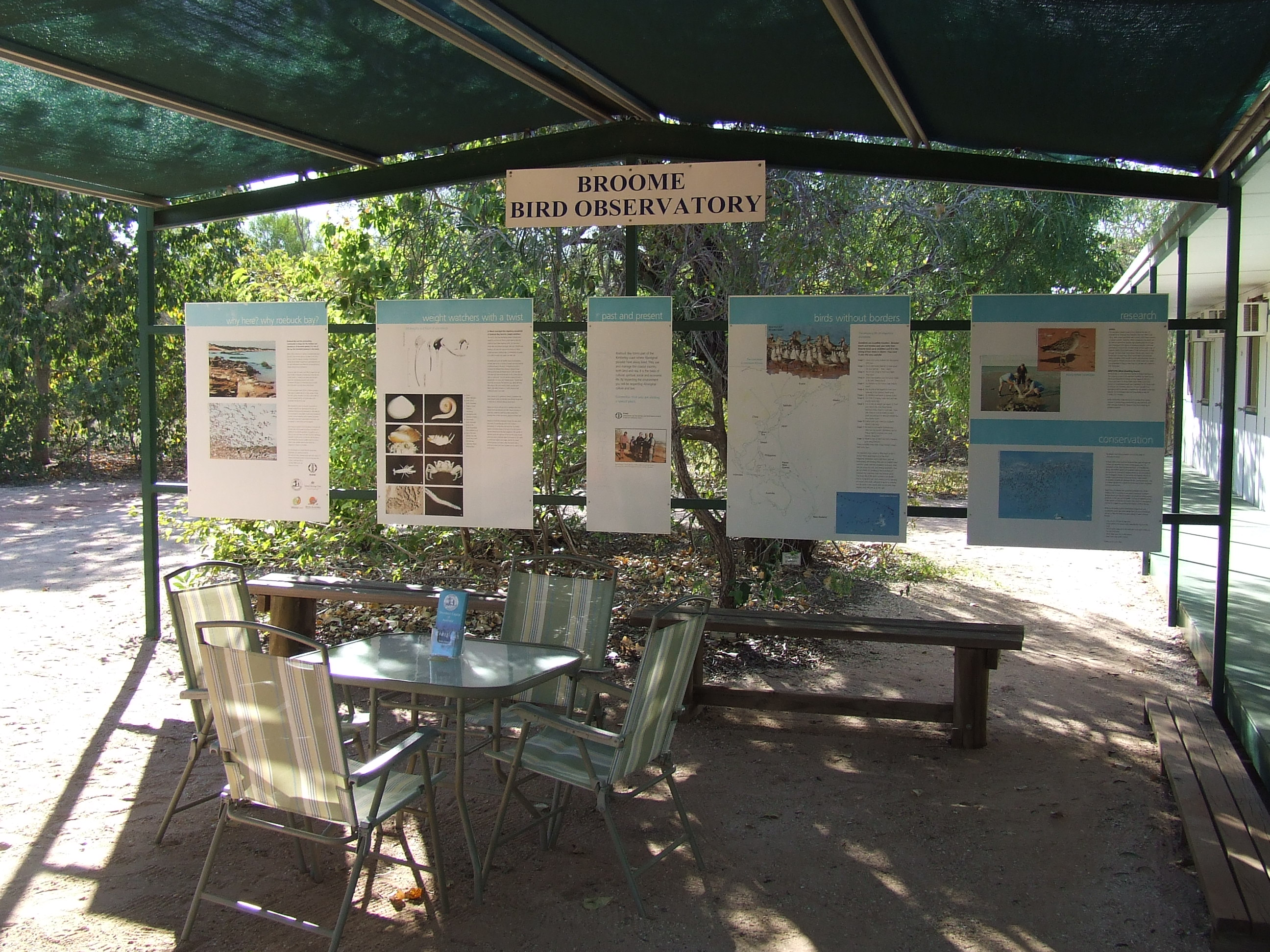
Display boards at Broome Bird Observatory

The Broome Bird Observatory is an educational, scientific and recreational facility located 24 km from Broome in the Kimberley region of Western Australia. It began operating in 1988 under the auspices of the non-profit organisation Birds Australia to provide a base for the study and enjoyment of the birds of Roebuck Bay and adjoining areas. The bay boasts the highest diversity of migratory waders in Australia. In March and April, immense flocks of waders can be watched as they depart to their breeding grounds in the northern hemisphere.

Broome Bird Observatory is set in pindan woodland on the northern shore of Roebuck Bay. It was formally opened in 1990 and continues to provide accommodation and birdwatching opportunities for visitors, tours, courses, as well as research facilities for scientists and ornithological expeditions.

The Clive Minton Discovery Centre at the Observatory, named after Clive Minton who undertook significant wader research in the area, was opened on 20 August 2021.

== Facilities ==
A number of facilities at the observatory are available for use, including a number of accommodation options. Many birdwatchers and researchers make use of these facilities when visiting the observatory.

=== Accommodation ===
There is one chalet and a number of rooms at the observatory. Those rooms include double/family rooms, bunk rooms, and single rooms. Camp sites are also available.

=== Amenities ===
At the observatory are located toilets, showers, a barbeque, and a camp kitchen, dubbed the 'Shadehouse'.

== Activities ==
A large number of activities occur year-round at the Broome Bird Observatory, especially those concerning birdwatching.

=== Courses ===
==== Wave the Waders Goodbye ====
The Wave the Waders Goodbye 5 day course occurs over peak wader migration to the northern hemisphere, most often in March or April.

==== Birds of the Broome Region ====
The Birds of the Broome Region 5 day course occurs in September or October, when the most number of species are present in the region at any one time. This time of year is also when shorebirds return to the shores of Roebuck Bay, and are at their most numerous at the observatory.

=== Tours ===
The Broome Bird Observatory offers a number of tours, primarily focused on birdwatching.

==== Shorebirds Tour ====
The Shorebirds Tour provides an introduction to shorebirds of the region, whereupon the tour takes participants to various areas of Roebuck Bay to observe shorebird species.

==== Mangrove Tour ====
The Mangrove Tour takes participants to Crab Creek and other mangrove areas of Roebuck Bay. Common Redshank is often seen on this tour.

==== Bush and Plains Tour ====
The Bush and Plains Tour takes participants to the Roebuck Plains Station, which lies to the north and east of the observatory. Yellow Chat is often seen on this tour.

==== Lakes Tour ====
The Lakes Tour is a full day tour, visiting wetland locations around Roebuck Plains Station.

==== Yellow Chat Twitch ====
This tour is focused on observing the Yellow Chat, a rare bird species most easily seen around the observatory.

=== Australasian Wader Studies Group ===
The Broome Bird Observatory hosts members of the Australasian Wader Studies Group (AWSG) over summer, when bird banding and other research activities take place.

== Access ==
The road to the Broome Bird Observatory is unsealed, and 4WD vehicles are recommended for accessing the observatory. The Broome Bird Observatory website recommends that one not follow the directions of Google Maps, and instead, when travelling from Broome, turn right onto Crab Creek Road.

== See also ==
- Pearl Coast Zoological Gardens, a zoo with a large collection of birds which existed in Broome from 1984 to 1992
