= YWR =

YWR may refer to:

- Yawuru language, ISO 639-3 language code ywr
- White River Water Aerodrome, in Ontario, Canada, IATA airport code YWR
