= Djukun language =

Extinct Australian Aboriginal language

Djukun
- Jukun
- Region: Western Australia
- Ethnicity: Jukun
- Extinct: by 1982 rememberers possible
- Language family: Nyulnyulan: Eastern; Yawuru–Djukun; Djukun
- Writing system: Latin

Language codes
- ISO 639-3: dyd
- Glottolog: dyug1238
- AIATSIS: K2

Jukun or Djugun is an Australian Aboriginal language of Western Australia. There are no longer any fluent speakers of Jukun, but some people may remember it to some degree. It is an Eastern Nyulnyulan language, closely related to Yawuru.

== Revitalization ==
A book titled 50 Words in Djukun: A Language Of The West Kimberley was published in 2025, facilitating the revitalization of the Djukun language.
