= Logan Northern Australia Water Scheme =

Irrigation scheme in northern Western Australia

The Logan Northern Australia Water Scheme, designed and proposed by John Logan, Chairman of Western Agricultural Industries (WAI), consists of two major projects:

- the West Kimberley Irrigation Project and
- the Kimberley to Perth Canal.

These two projects provide for the irrigation of 340,000 hectares near Broome, Western Australia, and the channelling of water 3,748 km by canal from the Fitzroy River to Perth.

This article gives background on the Logan Northern Australia Water Scheme to support fresh consideration of the proposals.

WAI remains ready to proceed with both proposals, which are held as its intellectual property, when approved by government.

== History ==
In 1991 Logan, a large-scale irrigation industry specialist, drawing on an idea of Ernie Bridge of the mid-1980s for a pipeline from the Ord River dam overland through the Great Sandy Desert to Perth, embarked on a study tour to explore the development opportunities of the extensive water resources of the northern zones of Western Australia, the Northern Territory and Queensland. After extensive research, he selected the West Kimberley region of Western Australia as the most suitable area due to its dry-season climate, water storage capability and ideal soil type and for the advantages of a project there: economies of scale, environmental sustainability, and proximity to port facilities and export markets. The plan involved three dam sites on the Martuwarra Fitzroy River - at Dimond Gorge, the Margaret River Gorge and on the Leopold River. No environmental studies were undertaken to understand the impacts on the river system. The proposal involved bulldozing 225,000 hectares of tropical savannah.

Logan formed a joint venture with Lend Lease–Logan of Kimberley Water Services and, following a positive feasibility study of the canal design concept by Lend Lease, submitted the irrigation and canal scheme as a fully funded development proposal to Western Australian Premier Carmen Lawrence and Water Resources Minister Ernie Bridge as a solution to water shortages in Perth and the Pilbara and as the basis of a large-scale, integrated irrigation industry, initially in cotton production, for the vast Kimberley region centred on Broome, employing a projected 1,300 Aboriginal people.

Following a change of government, the canal component of the scheme was rejected by the incoming Premier, Richard Court, who considered Perth did not have a water problem. However, his government undertook to support, through a Memorandum of Understanding (MOU) issued under the authority of Resources Minister Colin Barnett, Logan's commercially funded WAI West Kimberley Irrigation Project, designed to utilise the extensive flood flows of the Fitzroy River. WAI’s MOU included a groundwater investigation in the La Grange area south of Broome on Karajarri Country to grow crops like GM Cotton. When the licence expired in 2004, WAI needed permission from the Karajarri people to continue investigations. WAI were unable to negotiate access to the native title land for exploratory drilling, and did not undertake a detailed hydrogeological study due to the objections of Karajarri people.

Subsequently, in 2005, in a contract now expired, WAI joined with infrastructure company Tenix, to present the canal project to political leaders including Colin Barnett, who as opposition leader used the proposal as part of his unsuccessful 2005 state election campaign. He later admitted the plan was a mistake and cost him the 2005 WA State election He ruled it out when campaigning for the 2008 election but on 2 August 2012, after an election which brought him to the position of Premier and following Perth's driest July on record, Barnett raised the proposal again, saying that "from a technical or engineering point of view, it’s not difficult to do", as The Australian reported under the headline ‘Barnett’s waterway back on agenda’. The plan for water from the North was finally killed off in 2016 'Report kills off Colin’s canal idea' by the WA government's Department of Water, the report said "..taking supplies from “distant locations” is unaffordable."

== Northern water source ==
The Kimberley region, virtually undeveloped, contains an internationally significant water resource. The Fitzroy River, its catchments fed by variable tropical rainfall, is reported by government to deliver 9,000 gigalitres of mean annual flow, and at peak floods is one of the largest rivers in Australia, when it has been reported to discharge up to 30,000 cubic metres per second into King Sound of the Buccaneer Archipelago of the Timor Sea. The water required for the irrigation and canal projects would be obtained by harvesting 3,400 gigalitres (38%) of the mean annual flow, leaving 5,500 gigalitres (62%) of unused water to discharge nearby into the sea. These volumes have been found to be unrealistic given that the lowest flow at Fitzroy Crossing was 363 gigalitres. Further, no studies have been done to assess the environmental impact of extracting the proposed amount of water.

The WAI West Kimberley Irrigation Project and Kimberley to Perth Canal offer a successful conclusion to the long search to achieve the social, economically viable and sustainable development of the extensive but unutilised land and water resources of northern Australia, creating a new food bowl and fibre industry for both Australian and Asian markets. The environmentally conscious development of this one location, the West Kimberley region of the Fitzroy River, with the provision of a permanent urban and industrial water supply for the Western Australian community, has the potential to serve as a basis for replication, a demonstration that such projects are achievable in Australia's north.

== Environmental issues ==
Environmental groups generally consider neither the Kimberley nor its water resources should be developed. However, both the Irrigation Project and the Kimberley to Perth Canal represent an internationally unique "environmental-footprint design" in that they have been rigorously planned to prevent any damage to the Fitzroy River over its 733 kilometres (455 miles)—which would remain uninterrupted—or to aquifers, to fish, to floodplains, or to the surrounding environment. Instead, surplus wet-season flood flow would be pumped from the river only 60 kilometres (37 miles) inland from the coast, then transported by canal, avoiding any contact with the adjacent eco-sensitive flood plains, to be stored in the hydro-geologically identified La Grange Aquifer, a natural underground lake 270 kilometres (170 miles) long, from where it would be retrieved as required. This arrangement would provide a variable wet-season buffer supply for irrigation and for Perth, the Pilbara and other coastal communities as an alternative to building what had been perceived as a culturally and environmentally divisive dam proposed for upstream at Dimond Gorge on the headwaters of the Fitzroy River.

Findings of extensive studies in environmental and agricultural sustainability and cultural and economic feasibility, undertaken by WAI in conjunction with the Western Australian Department of Agriculture and Department of Resources Development and the CSIRO–Cooperative Research Centre over a six-year period from 1994 exceeded expectations, in that the scheme was considered to represent a new "international environmental benchmark", a design model for water production, storage, canal conveyance and distribution, for seasonal cyclonic damage protection, environmentally protective entomological control and a water-efficient sub-surface irrigation system.

== Project issues ==
The delay in the implementation of the West Kimberley Irrigation Project has been a result of Indigenous land rights issues, which have also continued to have the same effect on gas resource projects in the Kimberley region. The argument against further delay of the Irrigation Project is strong. It would service the production and initial processing of a large-scale integrated agricultural food and fibre industry centred on the port of Broome for product distribution to South East Asia and to Australian interstate markets. It is in the same league as the Snowy Mountains Scheme and the Murrumbidgee Irrigation Scheme, both acknowledged as nation-building projects that have contributed significantly to Australia's development. Further, the environmentally sustainable and carefully water-licensed development of northern Australia would achieve clear benefits for national security. It would comply with Australia's international moral obligation to conserve its water resources, and it would significantly contribute to the security of world food supply. While making these great contributions in global and national terms, it would also provide important social, health, economic and employment benefits in a region that otherwise presents few opportunities for Indigenous people. Finally, as noted above, it could serve as a model for the development of other areas of northern Australia.

The argument used against the Kimberley to Perth Canal has been based on cost, with comparison with sea-water desalination processes. The counter-argument, substantially enhanced when considered in conjunction with the benefits of the Kimberley Irrigation Project, is that the canal project, constructed as a specialised part of a flexible, integrated statewide water supply system, would better address the needs of practically all areas of Western Australia, and that an objective review of its present comparative value might endorse it as a more cost-effective, environmentally sustainable and permanent solution than a host of desalination plants.
