= Yasukichi Murakami =

- Born: 19 December 1880; Kushimoto, Wakayama, Japan
- Died: 26 June 1944 (aged 63); Tatura, Victoria, Australia
- Resting place: Cowra Japanese Cemetery
- Known for: Business, inventing
- Spouse(s): Eki (1906–1918); Shigeno (1920–1944)

Studio portrait of Yasukichi Murakami from approx. 1906

Yasukichi Murakami (村上 安吉, Murakami Yasukichi; 19 December 1880 – 26 June 1944) was a businessman, photographer and inventor.

== Biography ==
=== Early life ===
Murakami was born in 1880 in Kushimoto, Wakayama, Japan. The area at the time was impoverished so his parents sent him with a relative in 1897 to Western Australia where they believed he would make his fortune in gold. He arrived at Cossack on the Saladin.

=== Western Australia ===
On arriving in Western Australia Murakami worked on a number of jobs before securing work in a general store owned by fellow Japanese immigrant Takazò Nishioka. In 1900 he and Nishioka moved to Broome where they remained in business together. When Nishioka died in 1901 his business transferred to his widow Eki. In 1906 Murakami married Eki, who was much older than Murakami. The business grew in size under the direction of the husband and wife team with the retail operations being supplemented by an import and export business as well as the institution of an unofficial banking operation for the local Japanese community.

After the local economy began to experience difficulties he was forced to sell his business and he was engaged by pearler Ancell Clement Gregory to manage the Dampier Hotel. In 1918 his wife left him and returned to Japan, dying soon after. He was remarried in 1920 to Shigeno "Theresa" Murata at the Broome Registry Office.

In 1921 Murakami and Gregory formed a joint venture to produce cultured pearls, however government intervention scuppered the plans. Murakimi's and Gregory's friendship caused consternation among the class-conscious local community.

=== Jockey ===
Murakami rode for trainer Ted Hunt in races at the Broome Turf Club with some success.

=== Diving suit ===
In 1926 developed a patent for a suit for pearl divers that was lighter and more manoeuvrable than traditional suits. Despite this the suit was not commercially successful.

=== Darwin ===
In 1936, with Gregory's assistance, he and his family moved to Darwin. In Darwin he operated a successful photography business.

=== World War II ===
With the onset of World War II and as a Japanese born Australian resident he was interned at the Tatura internment camp in Victoria. He was separated from his family after he was accused of being a Japanese spy.

== Death ==
Murakami died on 26 June 1944 at Tatura of a heart condition. He had nine children. He was buried at a local cemetery but was later reinterred at the Japanese Cemetery in Cowra, New South Wales.
