= Broome, Western Australia =

Broome: Rubibi (Yawuru); Jirrnginngan (Djukun)
- Town
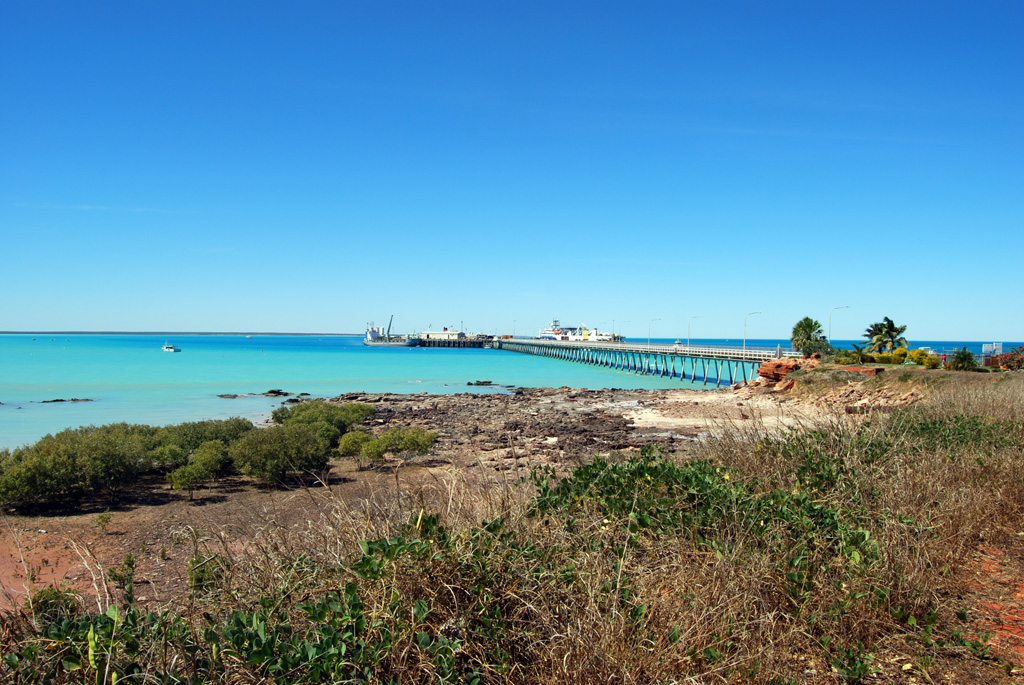
- Broome jetty

- Coordinates: 17°57′43″S 122°14′10″E
- Country: Australia
- State: Western Australia
- LGA: Shire of Broome
- Location: 2,046 km (1,271 mi) NNE of Perth; 1,744 km (1,084 mi) WSW of Darwin
- Established: 1883

Government
  - State electorate: Kimberley
  - Federal division: Durack
- Elevation: 19 m (62 ft)

Population
  - Total: 14,660 (2021 census)
- Time zone: UTC+08:00 (AWST)
- Postcode: 6725
- Mean max temp: 32.3 °C (90.1 °F)
- Mean min temp: 21.3 °C (70.3 °F)
- Annual rainfall: 628.0 mm (24.72 in)

Broome (/bruːm/, BROOM; Yawuru: Rubibi (/ˈruː.bɪ.bi/, ROO-bih-bee); Djukun: Jirrnginngan (/ˈdʒɪr.ŋɪn.ŋan/, JIRR-ngin-ngahn)) is a coastal pearling and tourist town in the Kimberley region of Western Australia, 2,046 km (1,271 mi) north of Perth. The town recorded a population of 14,660 in the 2021 census. It is the largest town in the Kimberley region.

== Toponymy ==
The town was officially named in 1883, after Sir Frederick Broome, Governor of Western Australia from 1883 to 1890. Sir Frederick had previously been Governor of Mauritius, and he was later Governor of Trinidad and Tobago.

In the Yawuru language spoken by the Yawuru people of the Kimberley region, the town's name is Rubibi. That name "refers to an important water place near Kennedy Hill and was ... traditionally used to refer to the Broome area."

Some locals have claimed, and others have denied, that Rubibi is an Aboriginal pronunciation of Roebuck Bay; one academic writer has commented "maybe [the] Roebuck Bay term was chosen because it was close to the Indigenous Rubibi?"

The name of the town in the Djukun language of the Djukun people, also of the Kimberley region, is Jirrnginngan, or Jirr-Ngin-Ngan. According to Jaala Ozies, a Djukun representative, "Rubibi ... is a waterhole. Jirr-Ngin-Ngan is the name that encompasses the Broome township." The Djukun Nation website asserts that "Jirrnginngan was the main rubibi (waterhole), which is buried beneath the Roebuck Bay Hotel," and also uses the syllabification Jirr.ngin.ngan.

== History ==
=== Prehistoric ===
Dinosaur footprints dated as Early Cretaceous in age (approximately 130 million years ago) were discovered 30 m (98 ft) out to sea at Gantheaume Point in the 1960s. The tracks can be seen only during very low tide. In 1996, some of the prints were cut from the ground and stolen, but have since been recovered.

=== Yawuru people ===
Broome is situated on the traditional lands of the Yawuru people. In 2006, the Yawuru people were formally recognised as the Native Title holders of their traditional lands and waters, acknowledging their ongoing connection and rights.

Prior to European arrival, the Yawuru people lived a sustainable lifestyle, relying on the abundant resources of their Country. They practiced traditional hunting, gathering, and fishing, utilising their knowledge of the environment to ensure resource availability.

Extensive trade networks existed among different language groups on the Dampier Peninsula and throughout the Kimberley region, facilitating the exchange of goods and knowledge.

=== European settlement ===
It is often mistakenly thought that the first European to visit Broome was William Dampier in 1688, but he only visited the north of what was later named the Dampier Peninsula. In 1699 he explored the coast from Shark Bay to La Grange Bay, from where he headed north leaving the Australian coast. Many of the coastal features of the area were later named for him. In 1879, Charles Harper proposed the formation of a Government Station at the Roebuck Bay Pastoral and Agricultural Association's site at Cape Villaret, at the south end of Roebuck Bay, to provide facilities for the extension of the Pearl Shell Fishery, and to form a port and base of operations for intending pastoral and agricultural settlers. In 1883, John Forrest chose the site for the town, and it was named after Sir Frederick Broome, the Governor of Western Australia from 1883 to 1889.

The 1880s saw the commencement of Broome's pearling industry, which initially involved slavery / coerced labour and free indentured labour, pearl diving being an occupation reserved for specific ethnic groups, most prominently from Japan and followed by other Asian countries.

The town centre of Broome, now known as Chinatown, developed around the jetties, and had a number of different names through the years. From the early years of white settlement until the Depression of the 1930s, the area was known by some as the Asiatic Quarter, Foreign Quarter or Native Quarter. The white locals favoured the name Japtown, whereas some of the non-white locals simply used the name Town, and indentured crewmen were "content to leave the area nameless", according to local historian Susan Sickert. Later, as the population increased, the name Chinatown stuck.

The character of the town in its pearling heyday was described in the book Broometime:

Back in the days of the pearling masters, Broome had several distinct sections. The European population lived in an area of well-spaced houses and shady gardens set back a little from the bay and laid out in a generous grid pattern. A few shops, banks, the post office, were scattered here and there. The local Aborigines mostly camped on the margins, or wherever they could. Eventually an area or two was set aside for their use, and they were expected to keep to them. The 'Asiatics' – the Malays, Manilamen, Koopangers, Japanese and Chinese who crewed the luggers and ran the shops and brothels and boarding houses – lived in a marshy area near Dampier Creek, close to where the luggers drew up. This was, and remains, Chinatown. It was a lively, chaotic place, especially when the luggers were in and the crew had money in their pockets. Old men would sit around the stoop of the Chinese bakery in Napier Terrace smoking opium smuggled in from Singapore in hands of bananas.

This multi-ethnic environment led to numerous racially motivated conflicts, most notably the 1920 race riots between Japanese and Malay residents, which resulted in eight deaths and at least 60 injuries. The Broome community came to "reflect the hierarchy of the pearling industry, which was based on occupation and ethnicity". White collar occupations and positions of power were exclusively held by Europeans. As a consequence, racial segregation was common in Broome until the 1970s.

In 1889, a telegraph undersea cable was laid from Broome to Banjuwangi, East Java, connecting Australia to England. The name Cable Beach was given to the landfall site.

In the early part of the 20th century, Aboriginal children from Broome were sent to live at the Beagle Bay mission, north of Broome. Children at Beagle Bay were often sent against their parents' wishes, on account of being "half-caste", and many lost contact with their families. George Walter, who was in charge of the mission, described Beagle Bay as "working in the interests of the blacks".

The Australian adventurer and novelist Ion Idriess drew inspiration from his visits to Broome to write his book Forty Fathoms Deep in 1937.

=== 1942 air attacks ===
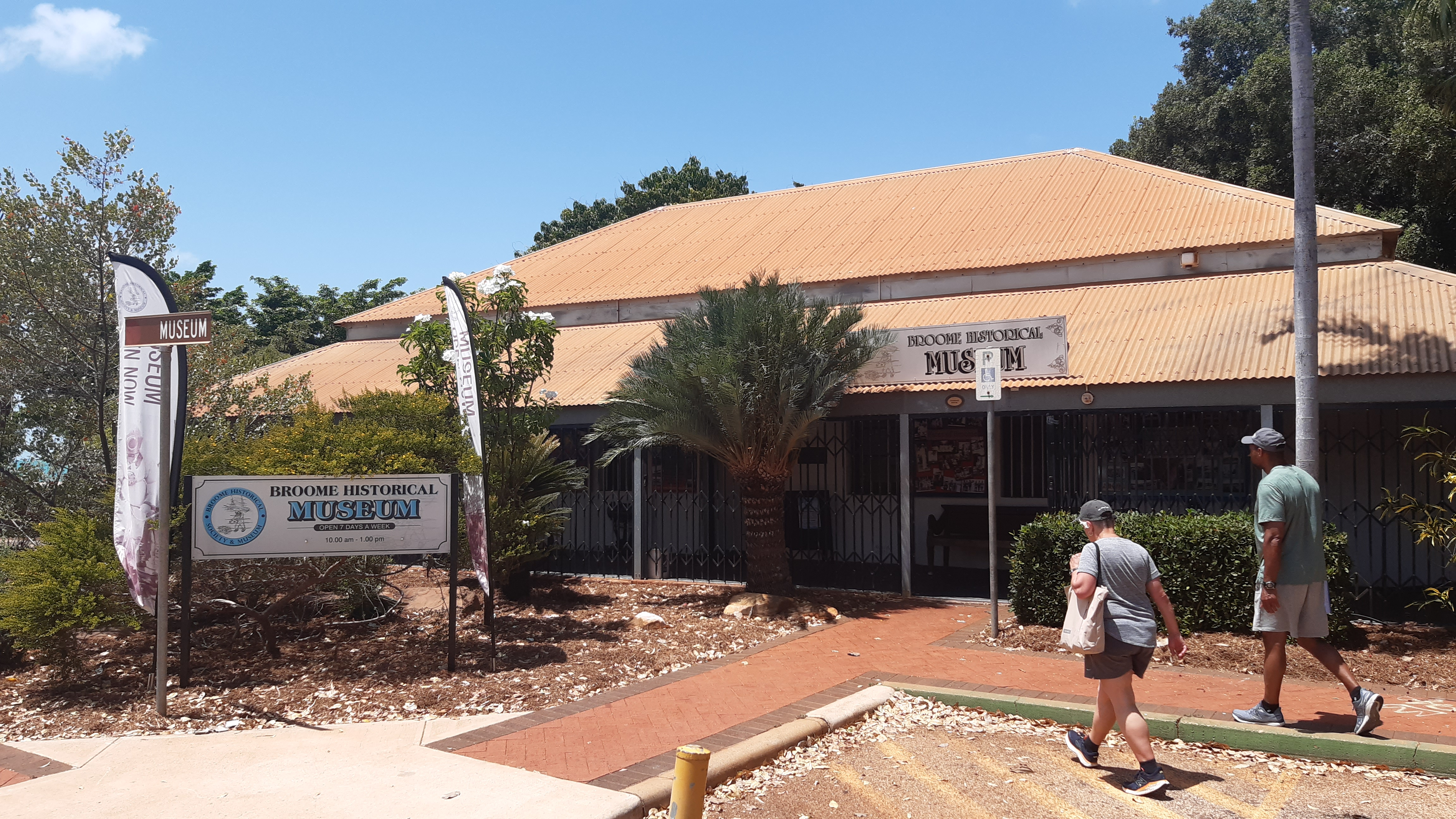
The Broome Historical Museum, which contains many items relating to the wartime history of the area

Broome was attacked at least four times during World War II as part of the Japanese air raids on Australia. The worst attack in terms of loss of life was an air raid on 3 March 1942 in which at least 86 people (mostly civilian refugees from the Dutch East Indies) were killed, making it the second deadliest Japanese attack on Australia after the bombing of Darwin. Twenty-two aircraft were destroyed, most of them flying boats, the remains of which can still be seen in the harbour at low tide.

Over 200 Japanese residents of Broome, were interned as "enemy aliens" during the war. This included three Aboriginal women married to Japanese residents.

=== The Common Gate ===
"The Common Gate" is the local term for the fences that defined Broome's town limits. Initially, these barriers were built to prevent livestock from entering the town. However, with the implementation of Western Australia's Native Administration Act 1905, they became tools of racial segregation, severely restricting Aboriginal people's freedom of movement. Until 1954, Aboriginal people could only enter if they had "lawful employment" and they were locked out of the town from 6pm.

=== 1950s to 2000s ===
In 1950, Broome was the setting for Arthur Upfield's novel The Widows of Broome, his 12th novel featuring Detective Inspector Napoleon Bonaparte ("Bony").

Until 1967, Broome's outdoor movie theatre Sun Pictures was segregated, with prime seating only for white people. Malays, Filipinos and First Nations sat on the side or had to stand, and they were required to enter via a separate entrance. As late as 1971, Indigenous people were not accepted into restaurants in Broome. Patrons at the Roebuck Hotel and the Continental were segregated, with Aboriginal people drinking at the front bar at the Roebuck Hotel. In later years, the separated Indigenous bar at the Roebuck Hotel was abolished and it is now The Lounge Bar.

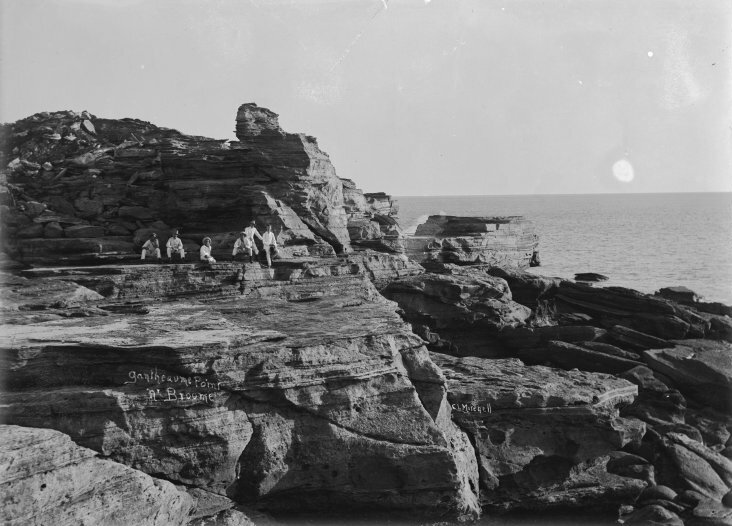
Gantheaume Point, c. 1910

Broome entered into a sister city agreement with Taiji, Japan in 1981 as historic ties between the two towns date back to the early 1900s, when Japan became instrumental in laying the groundwork of Broome's pearling industry. The annual dolphin hunt in Taiji was the subject of the 2009 documentary The Cove, and sparked a unanimous decision by Broome's council, headed by Graeme Campbell, to end the relationship with Taiji if the dolphin hunt were to continue. The decision was reversed in October 2009.

Author Donald Stuart, who first came to Broome for work in the Depression era of the 1930s, described the town as it was in 1983:

But no one in Broome today, whether newcomer or old timer, in private enterprise or in Public service, is in any great doubt as to where Broome's future development is heading. The Meat Works, in operation between mid-April and mid-October, is an employer of a considerable staff, and tourism is Broome's fastest growing industry (..) The town is well served by four hotels with first class airconditioned accommodation, two caravan parks with modern amenities and facilities, and plenty of stores, cafes, bars, restaurants, take-away food outlets, and of course curio and souvenir shops.

Lord Alistair McAlpine's Pearl Coast Zoological Gardens was opened in August 1984 to serve the burgeoning tourist industry in the town, as was the Malcolm Douglas Crocodile Park opened that same year. By 1987, tourism started to boom in the town, thanks in part to the bitumen road which had been completed and linked Highway One with Broome and the Kimberley. According to Martin Peirson-Jones, involved with real estate in the 1980s, there was a large shortage of accommodation between Broome and Kununurra, another town which was experiencing arrivals of bus tours for the first time. Land prices also rose exponentially within a short space of time, in reaction to the town's newfound potential, as recounted by Peirson-Jones:

"There were large subdivisions taking place and that led to a change of focus in the town. It was interesting to watch the land auction prices rise from hundreds of dollars to thousands and then tens of thousands, all within the space of a few years. As more people came in they wanted more facilities, better roads and were expecting more. Prior to this nobody worried too much and the expectations were not there."

In 1992, the newspaper Broome News (est. 1977) ceased production, whilst on 18 June 1992 the Broome Advertiser began, still existing as of 2026.

In December 1992, roughly 1,000 people gathered at Broome Airport to witness the first international flight arriving from Singapore, carrying 240 passengers. The Broome Advertiser reported that "as the first passengers disembarked, they were greeted by loud cheers and applause from the crowd creating a carnival atmosphere." The flight was the first time a Boeing 767 had landed in Western Australia outside of Perth.

In July 1993, the crew of the Indonesian fishing vessel Bunga Tanjung were apprehended off the Kimberley coast, and charged with fishing for trochus inside the Australian Fishing Zone without a licence. The crew of 18 had been on their way to the Rowley Shoals when found, which they claimed in Broome District Court they had not known was a marine park. From 1988 to July 1993, Customs Coastwatch apprehended a total of 235 illegal vessels in northern waters, of which 197 had come from Indonesia.

=== 2008 to 2013: Save the Kimberley campaign ===
The Broome community led a campaign to protest against a proposal by Woodside Energy to industrialise James Price Point outside Broome with gas refineries. The campaign received ardent support from public figures such as John Butler, Missy Higgins, Clare Bowditch, Jimmy Barnes, Paul Kelly, Xavier Rudd, Shane Howard, Rob Hirst, Pigram Brothers and former leader of the Australian Greens, Dr Bob Brown. The campaign was one of the biggest in Australian history with many actions leading to arrests including 25 in one day on "Black Tuesday", 5 July 2011 when over 100 riot police were sent to Broome to break up a month long blockade. A concert for the campaign was held on 5 October 2012 at Federation Square in Melbourne and was attended by approximately 6,000 people. A long term protest camp operated at James Price Point. One of the campaign points was to protect the significant "dinosaur highway" of dinosaur tracks that are found in the intertidal zone outside Broome. The campaign has since remained a divisive topic amongst locals, with many blaming the "no" decision for the slow economic growth that characterises the region.

== Geography ==
Broome is located on Western Australia's tropical Kimberley coast on the eastern edge of the Indian Ocean.

=== Roebuck Bay ===
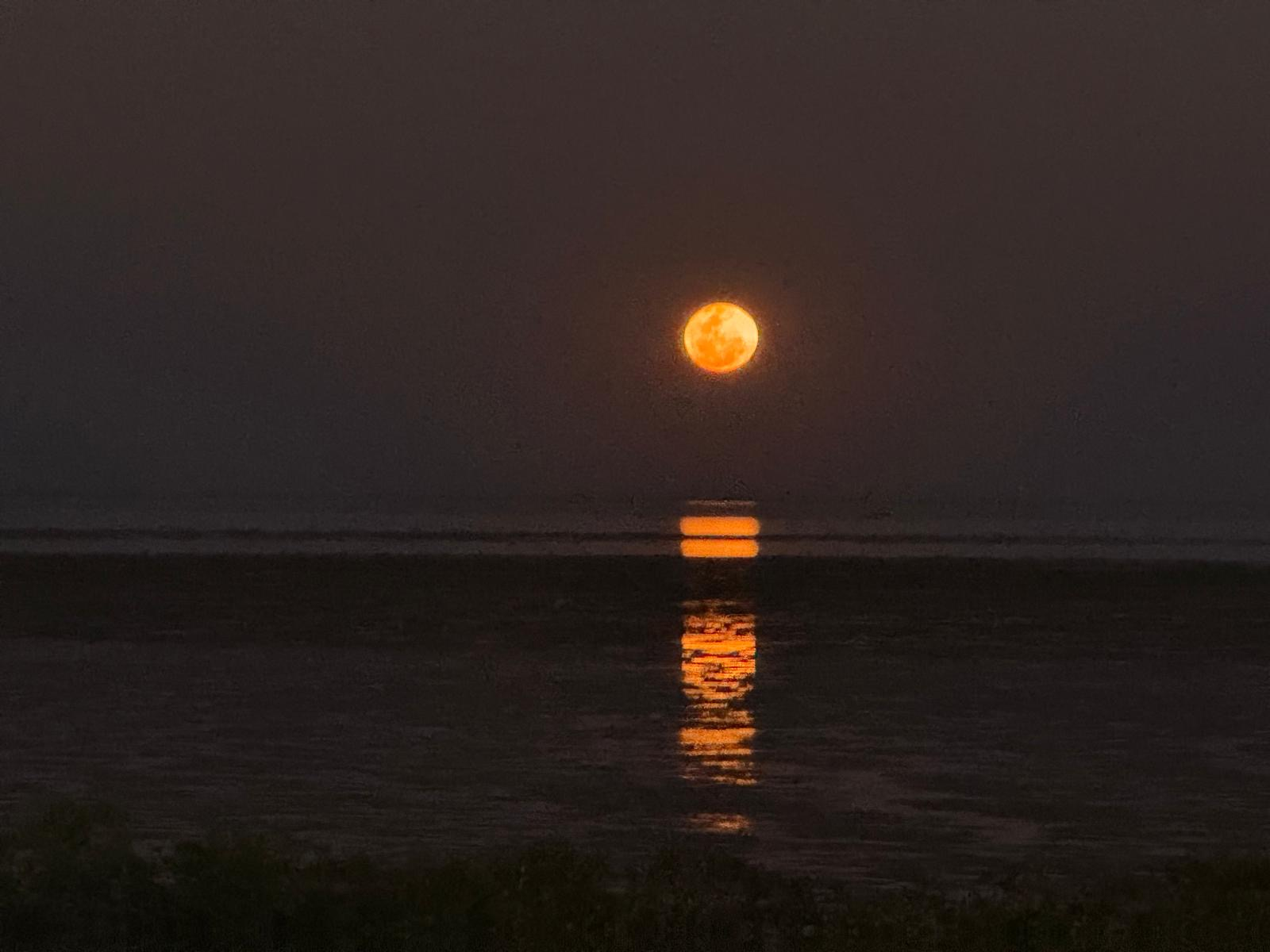
Staircase to the Moon phenomenon over Roebuck Bay, Broome

Being situated on a north–south peninsula, Broome has water on both sides of the town. On the eastern shore are the waters of Roebuck Bay extending from the main jetty at Port Drive to Sandy Point, west of Thangoo station. Town Beach is part of the shoreline and is popular with visitors on the eastern end of the town. It is the site of the "Staircase to the Moon", where a receding tide and a rising moon combine to create a natural phenomenon that resembles a staircase reaching for the moon. On "Staircase to the Moon" nights, a food and craft market operates on Town Beach. The phenomenon only occurs in one other location in the world, the Nile River in Egypt.

Roebuck Bay is of international importance for the millions of migrating waders or shorebirds that use it seasonally on migration through the East Asian – Australasian Flyway from their breeding grounds in northern Asia. They feed on the extensive intertidal mudflats and roost at high tide on the red sand beaches of the bay. They can be seen in the largest numbers in summer, but many of the younger birds remain throughout the first and second years of their lives. The Broome Bird Observatory, sited in pindan woodland close to the northern shore of Roebuck Bay, was established by Birds Australia in 1988, and formally opened in 1990. The purpose of the observatory is to study the birds, learn how to protect them and educate the public about them.

A mixed black flying fox and little red flying fox colony of around 50,000 megabats lives all year in mangroves next to Broome township's small Streeter's Jetty. They chatter and socialise loudly before flying out at dusk each evening. The bats are key pollinators and seed dispersers for native trees and plants.

=== Cable Beach ===
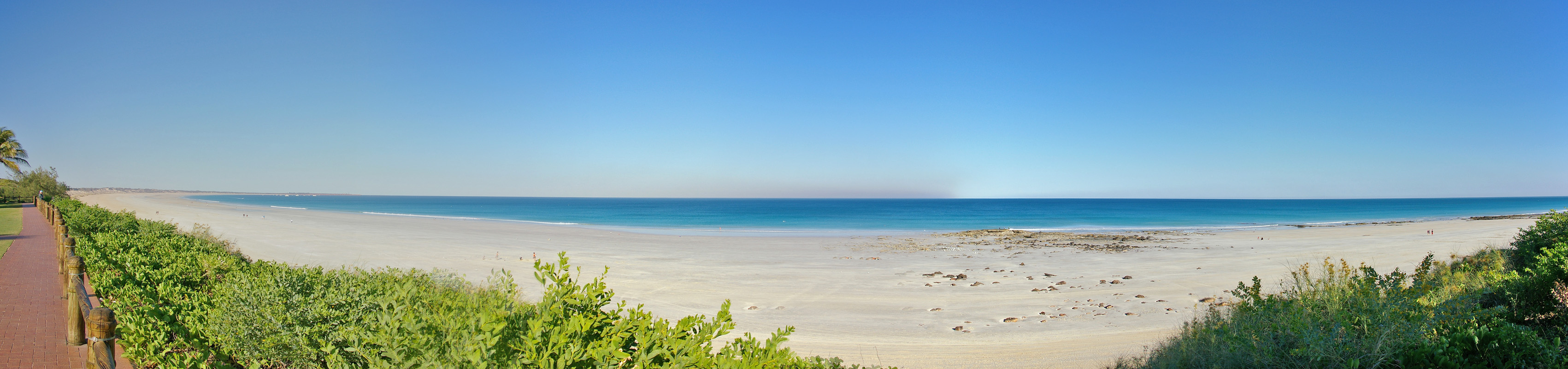
Panorama of Cable Beach

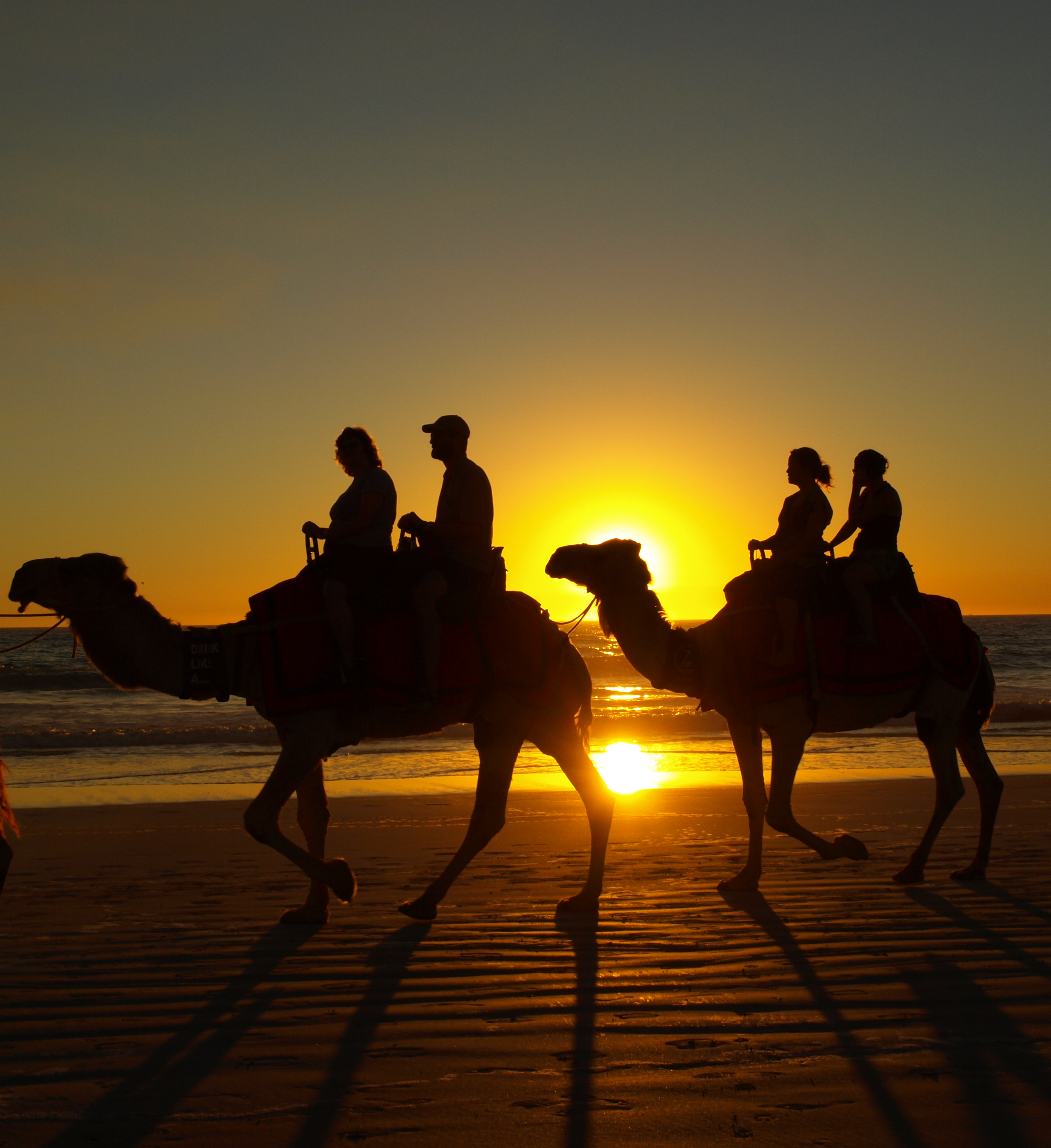
Tourists riding camels at Cable Beach in Broome at sunset

Named for the Java-to-Australia undersea telegraph cable that reaches shore there, Cable Beach is situated 7 km (4.3 mi) from town along a bitumen road. The beach itself is 22.5 km (14.0 mi) long with white sand, washed by tides that can reach over 9 m (30 ft). Located directly east of Cable Beach over the dunes is Minyirr Park, a coastal reserve administered by a collaboration of the Shire of Broome and the Yawuru people.

== Palaeontological significance ==
Fossilised Megalosauropus broomensis dinosaur footprints dated as early Cretaceous in age are 30 m (98 ft) out to sea at Gantheaume Point. The fossil trackway can be viewed during very low tide. Plant fossils are preserved extensively in the Broome Sandstone at Gantheaume Point and in coastal exposures further north.

The fossil trackways at Broome include possibly the largest known dinosaur footprints, sauropod tracks upwards of 1.7 m (5 ft 7 in) long. It is suspected that the sauropod that made these tracks might have been 7–8 m (23–26 ft) tall at the hip.

== Pearling industry ==
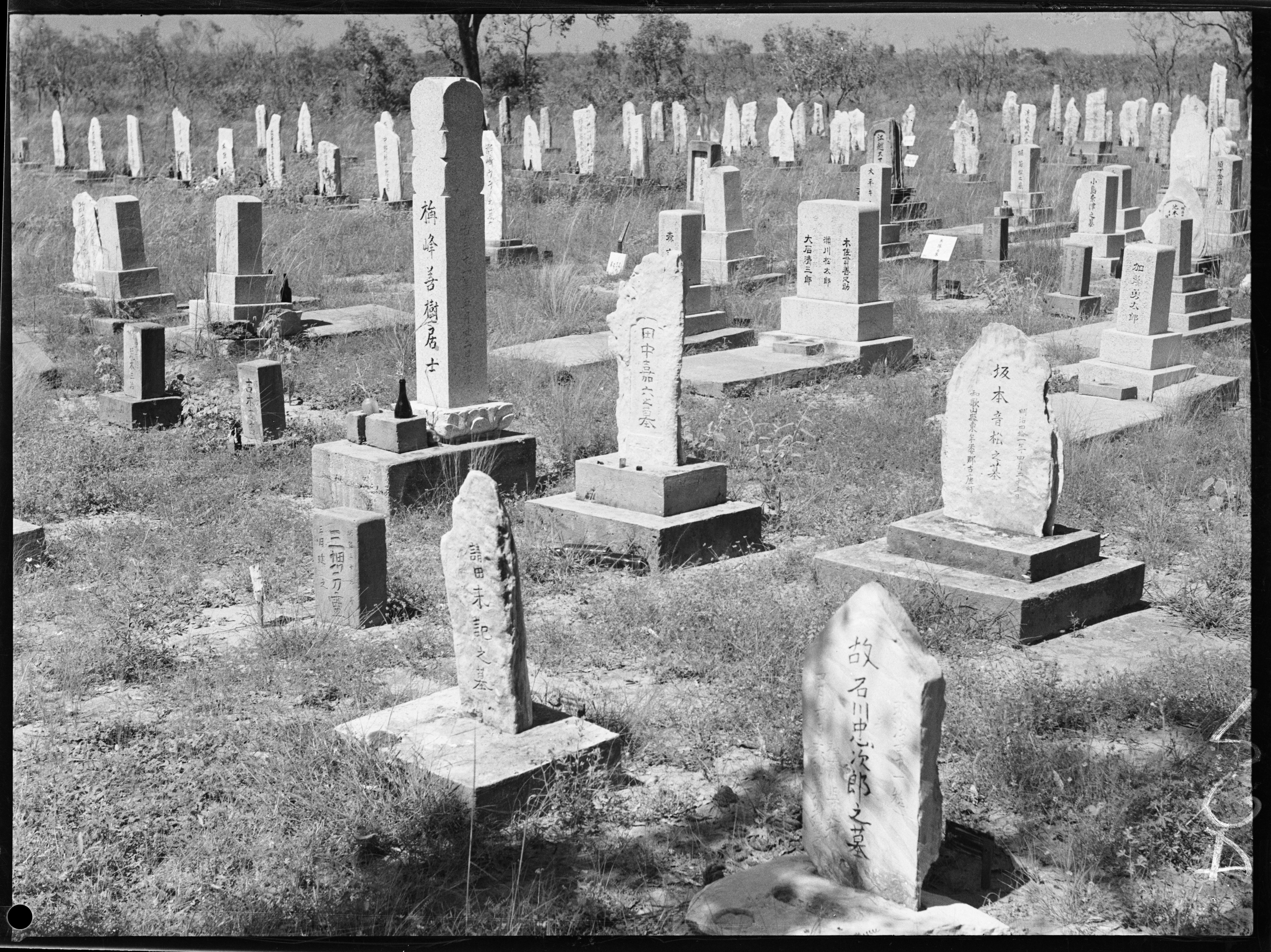

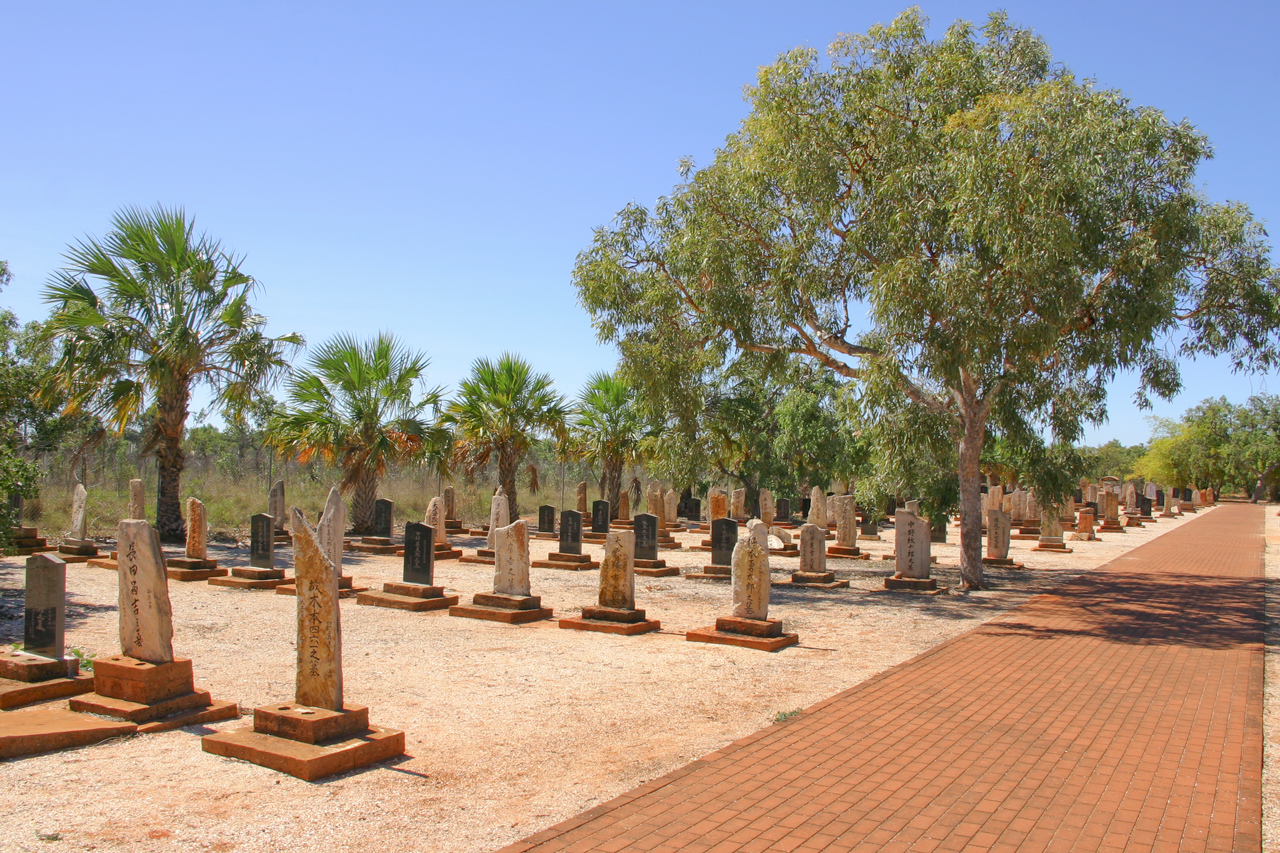
Headstones in the Japanese cemetery

The town has a history based around the exploits of the men and women who developed the pearling industry, starting with the harvesting of oysters for mother of pearl in the 1880s to the large present-day cultured pearl farming enterprises.

At first, Indigenous people, especially women and girls, were forced to dive for pearls by European pearlers, and many died working in the industry. Report of abuses in the early days of pearling led to legislation in 1871 and 1875 regulating native labour and prohibiting the use of women as divers.

By 1910, Broome was one of the leading producers of pearls globally. At that time, roughly 3,500 of the town's then population of approximately 5,000 worked in the industry. At the beginning of World War I, many of the town's pearlers were requisitioned for the war effort.

Asia-Pacific men, especially Japanese, excelled at pearl diving, with many of them becoming valued citizens in the town. Many Chinese and Japanese traders set up ventures in the town. Indeed, many people with Japanese names thrive in the community. Pearling was a dangerous and sometimes deadly occupation and the town's Japanese cemetery is the resting place of 919 Japanese divers who lost their lives working in the industry.

Each year Broome celebrates the fusion of different cultures brought about by the pearling industry in an annual cultural festival called Shinju Matsuri (Japanese for "festival of the pearl").

In 2010, the Shire of Broome and Kimberley commissioned a Memorial to the Indigenous Female Pearl Divers. In April 2019, the skeletons of 14 Yawuru and Karajarri people which had been sold by a wealthy Broome pearler to a museum in Dresden in 1894 were brought home. The remains, which had been stored in the Grassi Museum of Ethnology in Leipzig, showed signs of head wounds and malnutrition, a reflection of the poor conditions endured by Aboriginal people forced to work on the pearling boats. As of May 2019, the remains are being stored in Perth until facilities have been built to accommodate them in Broome.

== Population ==
According to the 2021 census, there were 14,660 people in Broome.

- Aboriginal and Torres Strait Islander people made up 23.4% of the population.
- 70.6% of people were born in Australia. The next most common countries of birth were England 2.9%, New Zealand 1.9% and the Philippines 1.5%.
- 74.1% of people only spoke English at home.
- The most common responses for religion were No religion 47.0% and Catholic 21.4%.

== Climate ==
Under the Köppen climate classification, Broome has a hot semi-arid climate (BSh), being a little too dry to be classified as a tropical savannah climate (Aw); like most parts of the Australian tropics, it has two seasons: a dry season and a wet season. The dry season is from April to November with nearly every day clear and maximum temperatures around 30 °C (86 °F). The wet season extends from December to March, with maximum temperatures of around 35 °C (95 °F), with rather erratic tropical downpours and high humidity. Broome's annual rainfall average is 615.1 mm (24.22 in), 75% of which falls from January to March. Broome observes an average of 48.4 days a year that record measurable precipitation. According to the indigenous Yawuru calendar, there are six seasons.

Yawuru calendar
Name	Month(s)	Translation	Characteristics
Man-gala	December–March	Wet season	Strong winds, monsoon
Marrul	April	Let-down from the wet	No wind, high tides, hot
Wirralburu	May	Dry season	No rain, hot days, cool nights
Barrgana	June–August	Cold season	Some fog, dry winds
Wirlburu	September	Warming season	Days and nights getting hotter
Laja	October–November	Buildup to the wet season	Hot and humid

Broome is susceptible to tropical cyclones and these, along with the equally unpredictable nature of summer thunderstorms, play a large part in the erratic nature of the rainfall. For instance, in January 1922, Broome Post Office recorded just 2.8 mm (0.11 in) of rainfall while in the same month of 2018, the airport received 945.4 mm (37.22 in). Dewpoint averages 24 °C or 75.2 °F in the wet season, but is as low as 8.4 °C or 47.1 °F in the dry season.

Frost is unknown; however, temperatures during the cooler months have dropped to as low as 3.3 °C (37.9 °F).

The average temperature of the sea ranges from 24.7 °C (76.5 °F) in July and August to 30.2 °C (86.4 °F) in March.

Climate data for Broome Airport (17.95°S 122.24°E, 7 m AMSL) (1939–2024 normals & extremes)
Month	Jan	Feb	Mar	Apr	May	Jun	Jul	Aug	Sep	Oct	Nov	Dec	Year
Record high °C (°F)	44.1 (111.4)	42.7 (108.9)	42.2 (108.0)	41.1 (106.0)	38.7 (101.7)	36.2 (97.2)	36.0 (96.8)	40.5 (104.9)	41.3 (106.3)	43.4 (110.1)	44.6 (112.3)	44.8 (112.6)	44.8 (112.6)
Mean daily maximum °C (°F)	33.3 (91.9)	33.0 (91.4)	34.0 (93.2)	34.3 (93.7)	31.7 (89.1)	29.3 (84.7)	29.0 (84.2)	30.4 (86.7)	31.9 (89.4)	33.0 (91.4)	33.7 (92.7)	33.9 (93.0)	32.3 (90.1)
Mean daily minimum °C (°F)	26.4 (79.5)	26.1 (79.0)	25.5 (77.9)	22.7 (72.9)	18.3 (64.9)	15.3 (59.5)	13.7 (56.7)	14.9 (58.8)	18.5 (65.3)	22.5 (72.5)	25.3 (77.5)	26.6 (79.9)	21.3 (70.4)
Record low °C (°F)	19.0 (66.2)	15.2 (59.4)	16.0 (60.8)	12.6 (54.7)	7.7 (45.9)	5.2 (41.4)	3.3 (37.9)	4.8 (40.6)	8.9 (48.0)	13.3 (55.9)	16.6 (61.9)	17.4 (63.3)	3.3 (37.9)
Average precipitation mm (inches)	198.7 (7.82)	177.8 (7.00)	98.8 (3.89)	25.6 (1.01)	27.0 (1.06)	18.3 (0.72)	6.2 (0.24)	2.1 (0.08)	1.4 (0.06)	1.4 (0.06)	9.6 (0.38)	63.0 (2.48)	628.0 (24.72)
Average precipitation days (≥ 1.0 mm)	9.3	9.0	6.2	1.9	1.6	1.1	0.5	0.3	0.2	0.2	0.8	3.9	35
Average afternoon relative humidity (%)	65	67	60	45	38	36	33	35	45	54	57	61	50
Average dew point °C (°F)	24.2 (75.6)	24.2 (75.6)	22.9 (73.2)	17.7 (63.9)	12.9 (55.2)	10.0 (50.0)	8.4 (47.1)	9.5 (49.1)	14.4 (57.9)	19.0 (66.2)	21.5 (70.7)	23.2 (73.8)	17.3 (63.2)
Mean monthly sunshine hours	257.3	223.2	269.7	294.0	291.4	282.0	303.8	325.5	312.0	334.8	333.0	294.5	3,521.2
Percentage possible sunshine	63	62	71	84	83	85	88	91	87	86	86	72	80
Source: Bureau of Meteorology (1939–2024 normals & extremes)

== Education ==
Broome contains six schools: five government, Broome Primary School, Broome North Primary School in the northern suburb of Bilingurr, Cable Beach Primary School in Cable Beach, Roebuck Primary School in the northern suburb of Djugun, and Broome Senior High School; and St Mary's College, a Catholic K–12 school.

== Sport and recreation ==
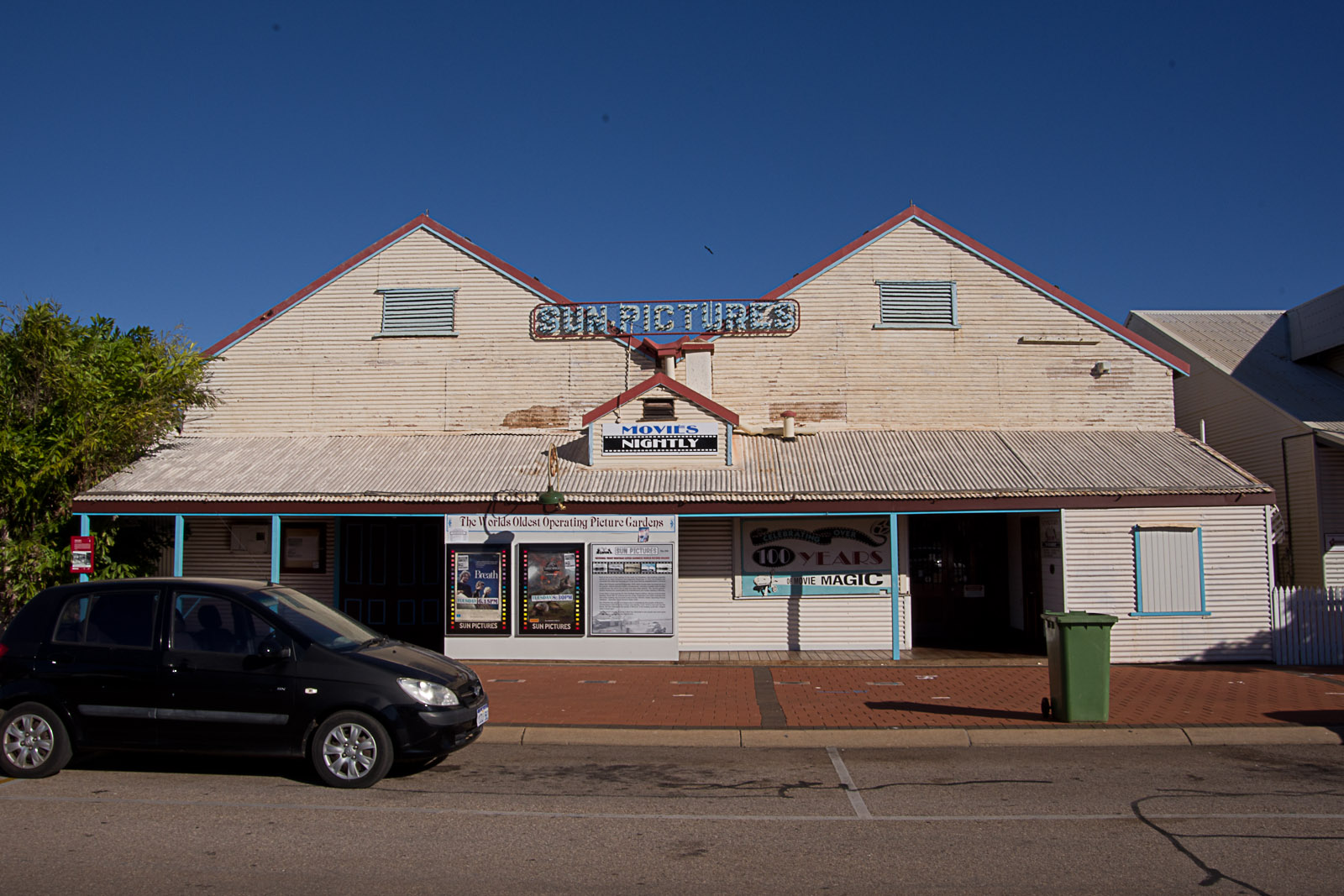
Sun Pictures building

Broome hosts a lawn bowling club and a golf club.

Broome is considered to be among the best places in the world to catch sailfish.

Four soccer clubs compete in the local Broome Football Association's BLiga competition each dry season. FC Meatworks, Pearlers, Racing G and Broome Town field sides across men's and women's divisions.

The town has four Australian rules clubs; Broome Bulls (established 1949), Broome Saints, Broome Towns and Cable Beach all competing in the West Kimberley District League with games played at Haynes Oval.

UFC lightweight contender, Quillan Salkilld grew up in Broome.

== Culture and entertainment ==
Broome is home to the Sun Picture Garden, the oldest operating open-air cinema in the world.

Marrugeku is a dance company led by co-artistic directors choreographer/dancer Dalisa Pigram and director/dramaturg Rachael Swain, who have worked together for 23 years. The company has Indigenous and non-Indigenous Australians working together to create new dance performances, and works from two bases, one in Broome and the other at Carriageworks in Sydney.

== Transport and infrastructure ==
Broome has a 35 km bitumen road connecting to Highway 1.

Broome International Airport is the regional air hub of northwestern Western Australia and is considered the tourism gateway to the Horizontal Falls and the whole Kimberley region.

The TransBroome public bus route 890 links Cable Beach and Town Beach. The route was launched in August 2025 to replace a private bus operator that had folded. In 2026 the public bus service received further investment that will see it expanded in future.

The Broome Tramway was an industrial tramway used to convey goods between Mangrove Point and the town centre from 1898 until the 1960s.

The town's electricity is provided by 17 gas generators and 9 back-up diesel generators, for a total of 42 MW.

== Media ==
Since 1992 Broome has been home to a local community newspaper, the Broome Advertiser, published each Thursday, part of the Seven West Media group. Previously Broome had a Saturday weekly newspaper, published from 1912 to 1930, The Nor-West Echo, the successor to the Broome Chronicle and Nor'West Advertiser (1908–1912).

ABC Kimberley, a part of the ABC Local Radio network, broadcasts from studios on Hamersley St in Broome.

Locally, television stations available include Seven (formerly GWN7), WIN9, WDT10, ABC, SBS and Goolarri Media's Goolarri Television. Seven Regional WA broadcasts a half-hour local news program for regional WA, Seven News, at 5:30pm weeknights; Seven Regional WA has a district newsroom covering Broome and surrounding areas based in the town.

== Crocodile park ==
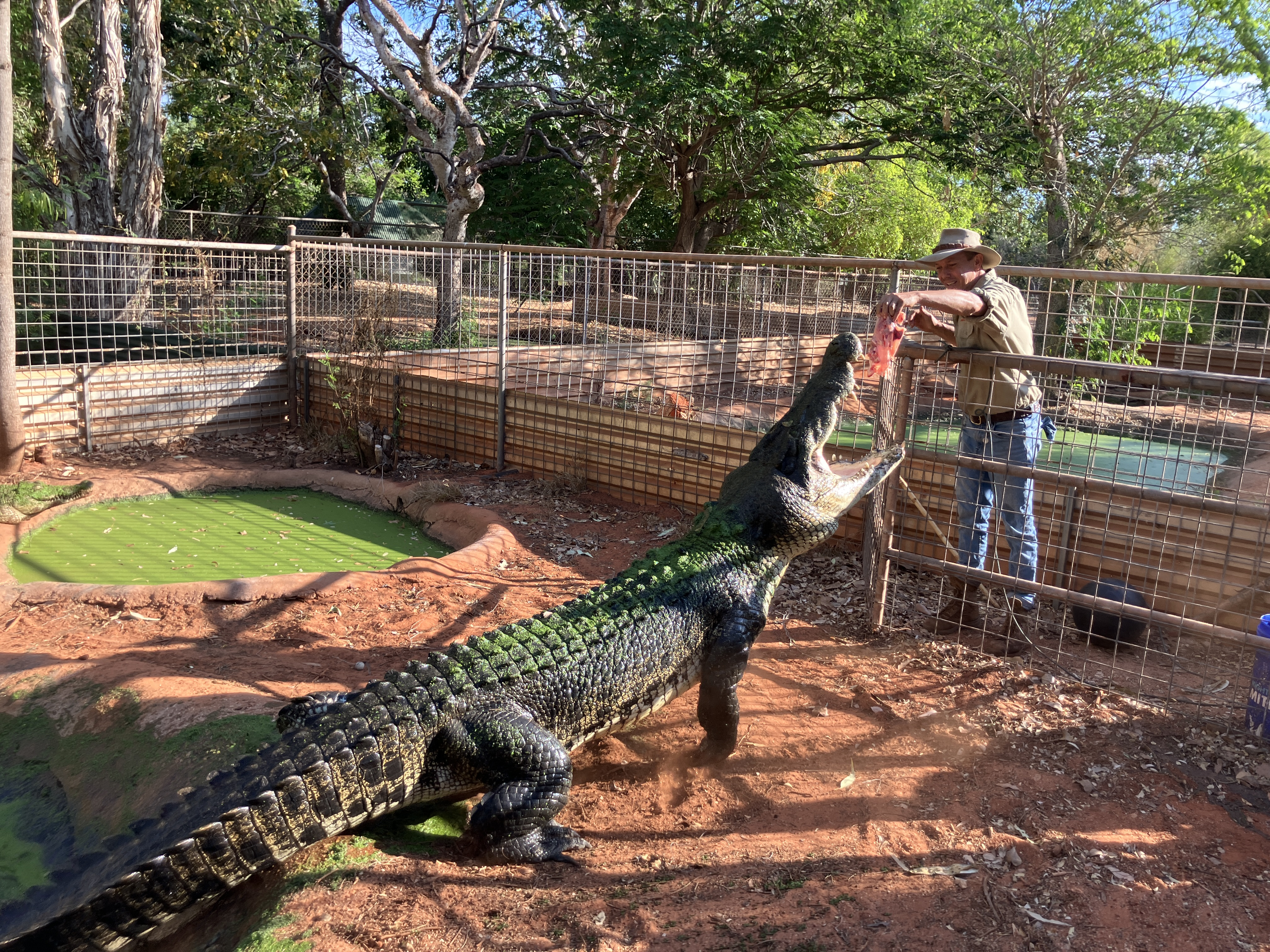
A staff member feeds a crocodile at the Malcolm Douglas Crocodile Park

The Malcolm Douglas Crocodile Park is located about 16 kilometres (10 mi) from Broome. It was established in 1983 by the wildlife documentary maker Malcolm Douglas, and holds 30 adult crocodiles that have been captured in the wild after threatening humans. The park is home to Fatso, a saltwater crocodile who on 12 July 2010 bit a Melbourne man, Michael Newman, who climbed into his enclosure.

== Notable people ==
Former or current residents of the town have included:

- Quillan Salkilld, Australian mixed martial artist
- Mark Bin Bakar, Indigenous Australian musician, comedian and radio announcer
- Malcolm Douglas (1941–2010), Australian wildlife documentary film maker, and crocodile hunter
- Lord Alistair McAlpine (1942–2014), British businessman, politician and author
- Yasukichi Murakami (1880–1944), Japanese businessman, photographer and inventor

== See also ==
- Logan Northern Australia Water Scheme, a water scheme in the area

== Sources ==
- Coombs, Anne; Varga, Susan (2001). Broometime. Sydney: Hodder Headline Australia. ISBN 0-7336-1449-3.
- Stuart, Donald (1983). Broome: Landscapes and People. Fremantle: Fremantle Arts Centre Press. ISBN 0-909144-42-7.
- Sickert, Susan (2003). Beyond The Lattice: Broome's Early Years. Broome: Backroom Press Inc. ISBN 9780977561599.
- Trevor, Noel (2000). Why Broome?. Cable Beach, Broome: Noel Trevor & Associates Pty. Ltd. ISBN 0-646-38649-2.
- Trevor, Noel (2002). Why Not Broome?. Cable Beach, Broome: Noel Trevor Enterprises. ISBN 0957961006.
