= Cable Beach =

- Suburb
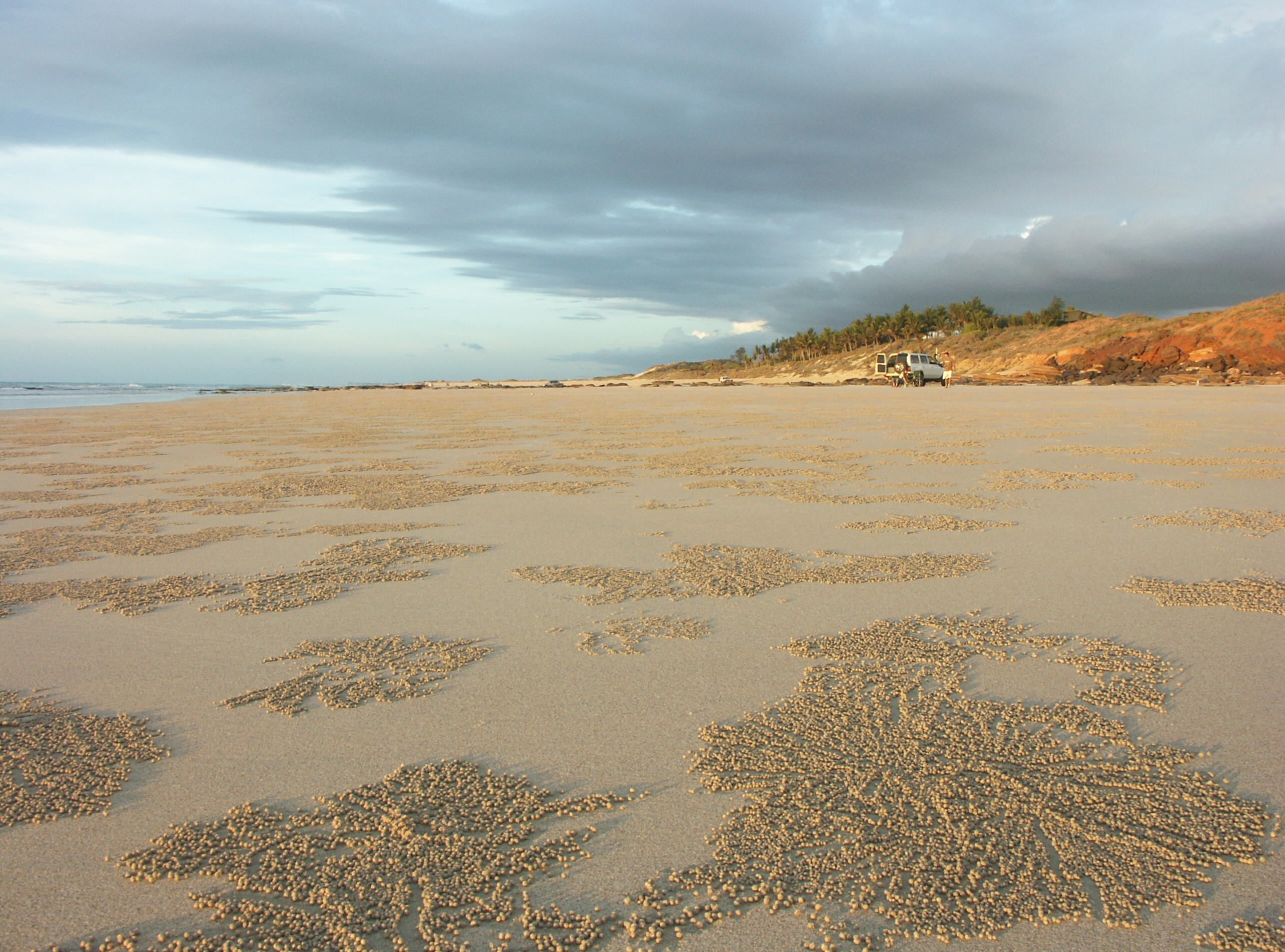
- Cable Beach at low tide

- Interactive map of Cable Beach
- Coordinates: 17°57′08″S 122°12′20″E
- Country: Australia
- State: Western Australia
- LGA: Shire of Broome
- Location: 4 km (2.5 mi) west of Broome CBD

Government
  - State electorate: Kimberley
  - Federal division: Durack
- Postcode: 6726

Cable Beach is a 22 km (14 mi) stretch of white sand beach on the eastern Indian Ocean and the name of the surrounding suburb in Broome, Western Australia. Cable Beach was named after the telegraph cable laid between Broome and Java in 1889. Low cliffs of red ochre rise behind the very flat and wide beach, with waves that are mostly gentle in the dry season from May to October. In 2016, the population was 5,436.

== Geography ==
Gantheaume Point is located at the extreme southern end of the beach. The Gantheaume Point lighthouse is a good place for observing dolphins and migrating whales during their migration seasons. Dinosaur footprints estimated at 130 million years old are visible in the rocks at low tides.

Minyirr Park is located adjacent to the southern section of the beach with walking trails that traverse the area behind the red ochre dunes. The park is a coastal reserve that protects the traditional land of the Yawuru people.

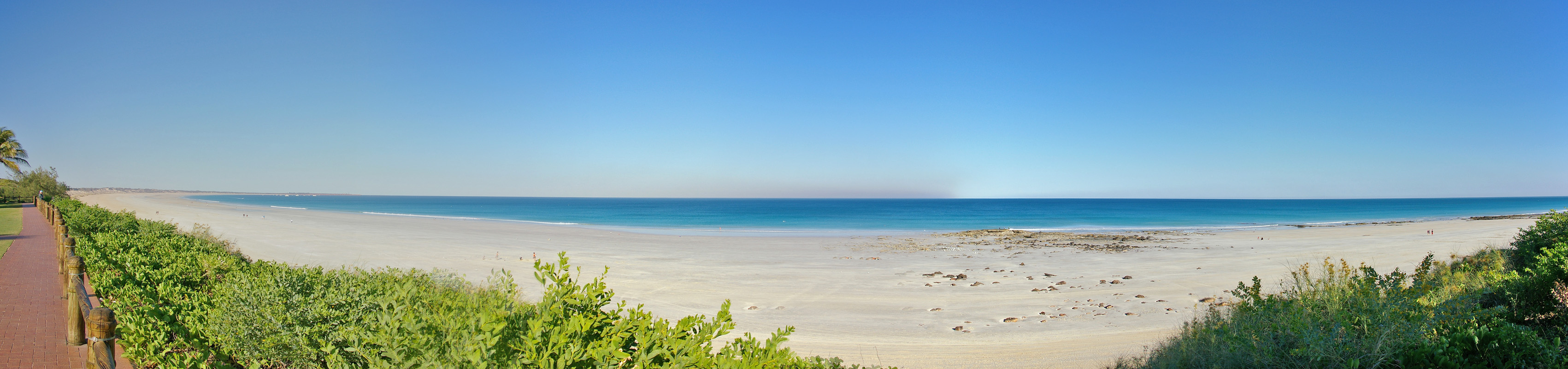
Panorama of Cable Beach

== Flora and fauna ==
Box jellyfish, also known as stingers, may be present between November and April and caution is required when swimming there during this period. Warning signs are posted on the beach and stingers may be present outside the normal wet season months.

Irukandji jellyfish are also known to occasionally appear in the waters during the wet season. The January 1989 edition of Broome News noted the recent stinging of four beachgoers by the jellyfish, who required treatment at Broome District Hospital. Trevor Fernihough, Senior Medical Officer, warned readers of the dangers of being stung by the jellyfish:

"The jellyfish are almost transparent making them difficult to see in the water. The best precaution beachgoers can take against being stung, is to simply stay out of the water. The Irukandji sting is extremely painful, particularly for small children who could require a hospital stay of two to three days while they recover."

There have been cases where crocodiles have been sighted off the shore occasionally and preventative measures are taken.

== Human use ==
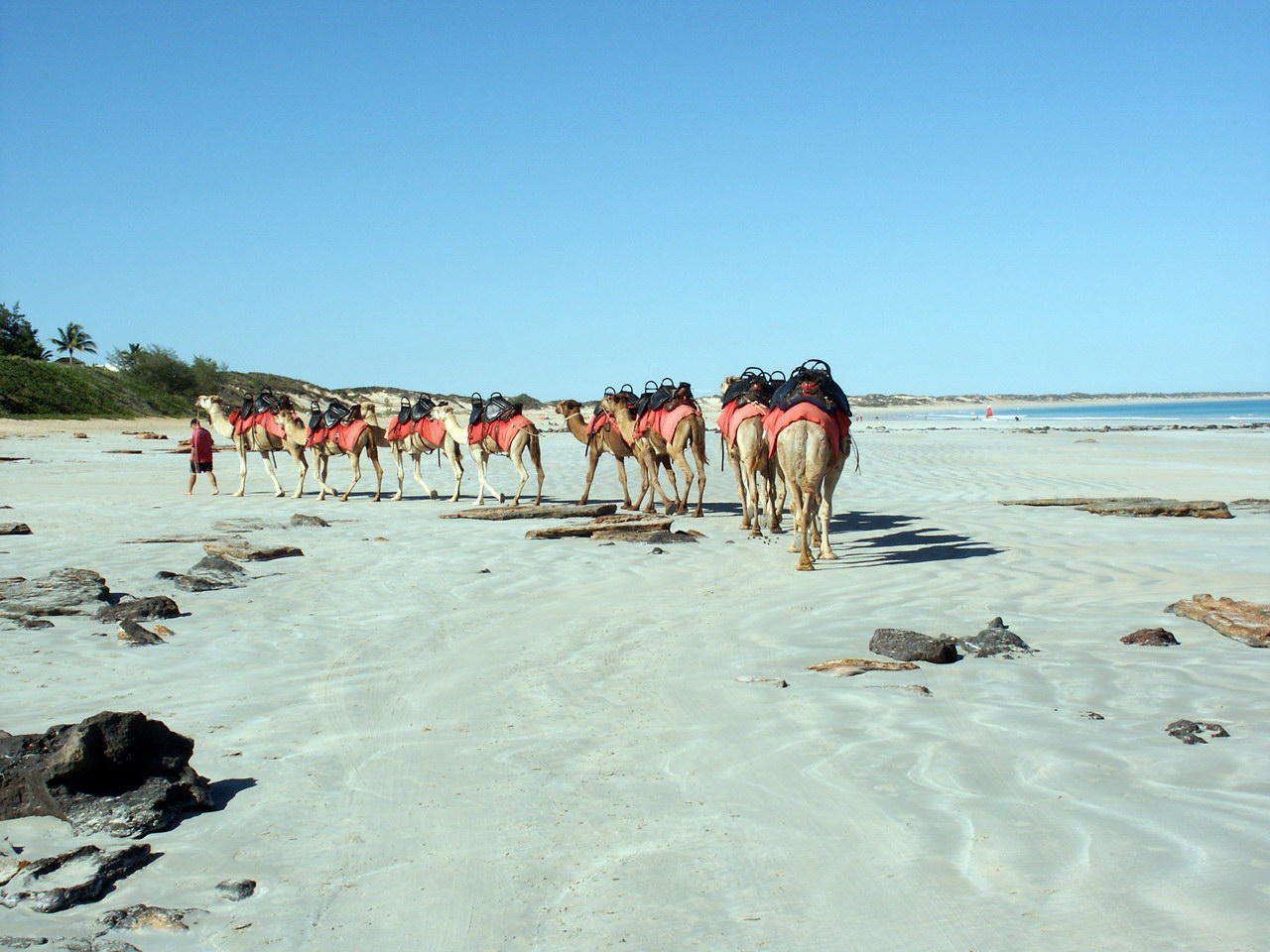
A camel train on the beach

Cable Beach is home to one of Australia's most famous nudist beaches. The clothes-optional area is to the north of the beach access road from the car park and continues to the mouth of Willie Creek, 17 km (11 mi) away. (Note: Location of the nudist beach 17°55′11″S 122°12′40″E)

Four-wheel drive vehicles are permitted north of the rocks. This allows people to explore the beach at low tide to a much greater extent than would be possible on foot.

Camel rides are available around sunrise and sunset hours.

The suburb contains a government primary school, Cable Beach Primary School.
