= Yawuru language =

Nyulnyulan language spoken in Australia

Yawuru
- Region: Australia
- Ethnicity: Yawuru, Jukun
- Native speakers: 152 (2021 census)
- Language family: Nyulnyulan: Eastern; Yawuru
- Dialects: Julbayi; Marangan

Language codes
- ISO 639-3: ywr
- Glottolog: yawu1244
- AIATSIS: K1
- ELP: Yawuru
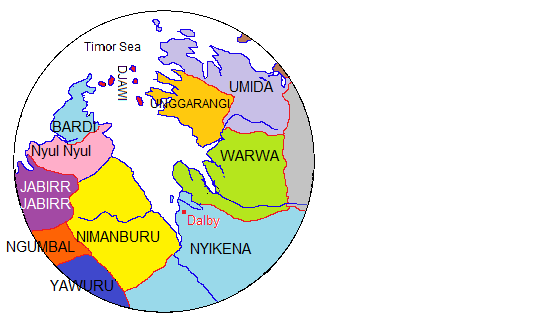
- Map of the traditional lands of Australian Aboriginal tribes around Derby, Western Australia. Yawuru is the dark blue.

Yawuru is a Western Nyulnyulan language spoken on the coast south of Broome in Western Australia.

Grammatically it resembles other Nyulnyulan languages. It has a relatively free word order.

By the late 1990s the number of fluent speakers of Yawuru had dropped to a handful but a few younger people dedicated themselves to learning the language and they are now teaching it in schools and in adult classes, in Broome.

== Phonology ==
The vowel phonemes are short vowels /ɪ/, /a/, and /u/, and long vowels /iː/, /aː/, and /ʊː/ (spelled ii, aa, uu).

Consonantal segments include:

		Bilabial	Alveolar		Retroflex	Palatal	Velar
		Bilabial	plain	palatalized	Retroflex	Palatal	Velar
Stop	voiceless	p	t	t̠ʲ	ʈ		k/q
Stop	voiced	b	d	d̠ʲ	ɖ		g
Nasal		m	n	n̠ʲ	ɳ		ŋ
Approximant	lateral		l	l̠ʲ	ɭ		
Approximant	plain				ɻ	j	w
Flap			ɾ	ɾʲ			

Speakers also use glottal stops, implosives, and ejectives.

Syllable structure in the initial position is #CV(:) (C(C)), in the medial position is CV(:)(C), and in the final position is CV(C(C))#. # representing the word boundary, C standing for consonant, V for vowel, and V: for long vowel. The most common syllables are CV or CVC (CV: or CV:C).

== Grammar ==
There is no noun class in Yawuru. Adverbs belong to the same class as nominals. There is a verb class. Nouns and adjectives are distinguished through semantic context.

=== Morphology ===
Nominals inflect for case and adverbs, belonging to this class, take case markers. Case markers are signified by enclitics. Nominals do not have a declension class. Verbs inflect to denote person, number, tense, mood, and aspect. Prefixes, suffixes, and enclitics are used to conjugate verbs.

There are four person categories in Yawuru: first person, second person, third person, and fourth person, which is made up by a first person inclusive (includes the speaker and the hearer).

=== Syntax ===
Word order is flexible, with the verb often preceding the subject.

== Vocabulary ==
Yawuru has a large borrowing from neighbouring Pama-Nyungan languages. The vocabulary is specifically strong in terms of environment, reflecting on the culture.
