= Roebuck Bay =

Bay in Western Australia

Coordinates: 18°07′S 122°16′E

Designations

Ramsar Wetland
- Official name: Roebuck Bay
- Designated: 7 June 1990
- Reference no.: 479

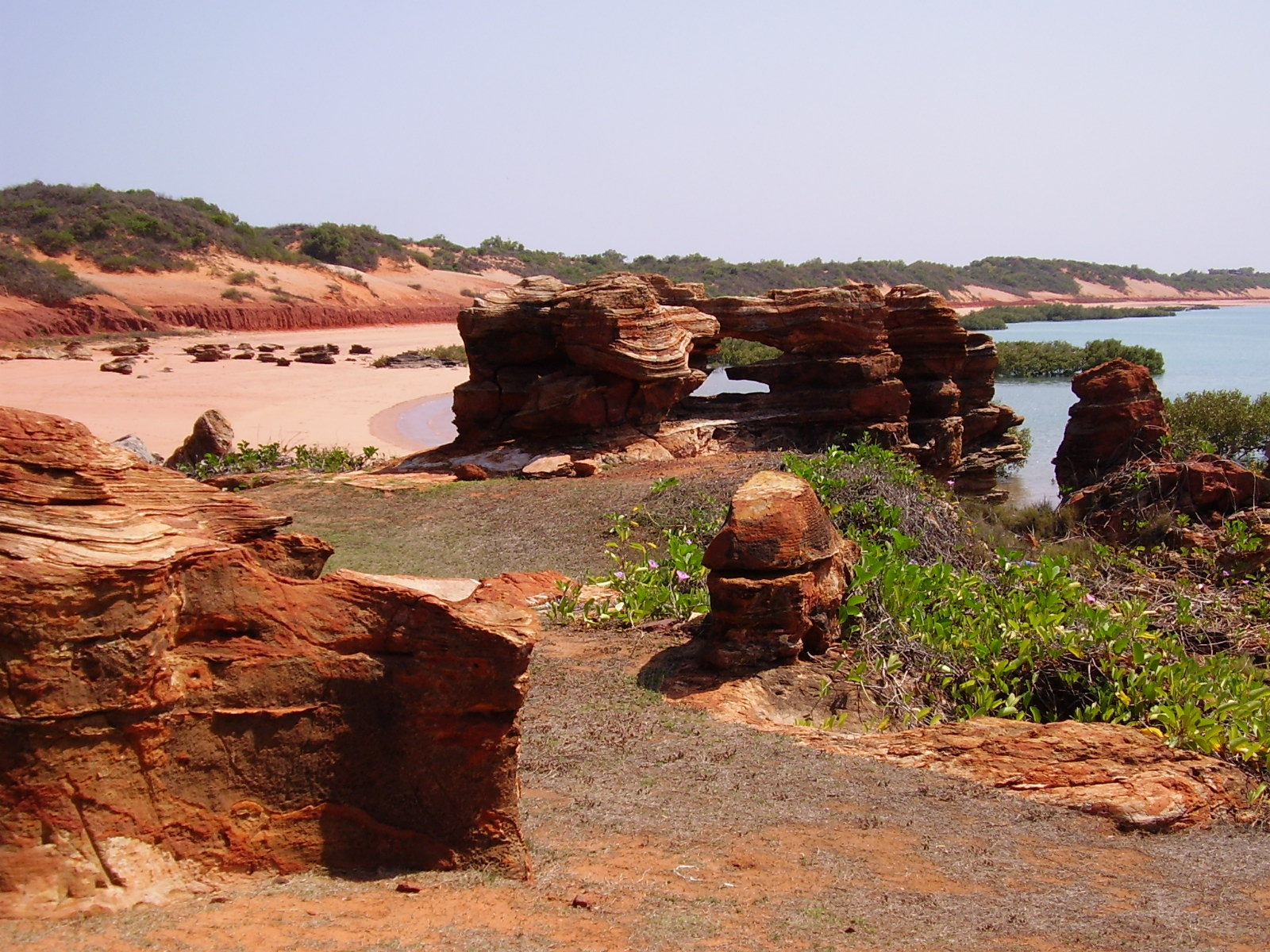
The red sand beaches of northern Roebuck Bay

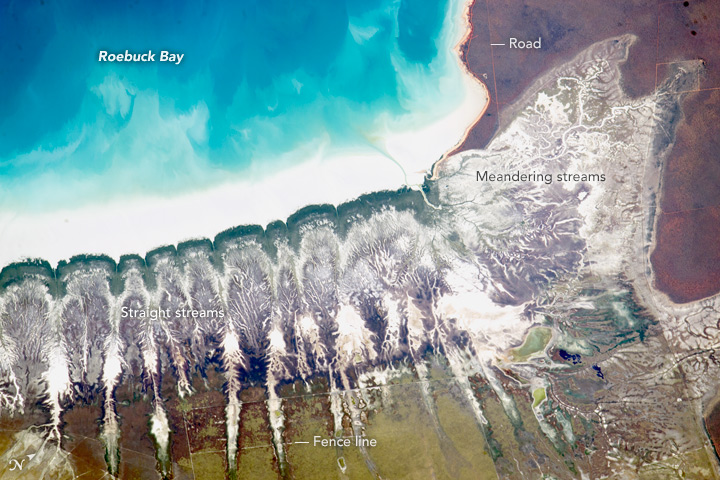
Astronaut photo of the coastline of Roebuck Bay, 2015. Broome is just offscreen at top right.

Roebuck Bay is a bay on the coast of the Kimberley region of Western Australia. Its entrance is bounded in the north by the town of Broome, and in the south by Bush Point and Sandy Point. It is named after HMS Roebuck, the ship captained by William Dampier when he explored the coast of north-western Australia in 1699. The Broome Bird Observatory lies on the northern coast of the bay.

== Description ==
Roebuck Bay is a 550 km^{2} (210 mi^{2}) tropical, marine embayment. It has red sandy beaches and areas of mangroves, with the eastern edge of the bay being made up of linear tidal creeks. It is surrounded by grasslands and pindan woodland.

The northern shore of the bay is dominated by a long and low red cliff, 2–6 m in height, of pindan soil which gives the beaches there their distinctive red colouration. It overlies yellowish-red Broome Sandstone of Cretaceous age which, when exposed at the base of the cliff, shows occasional fossil footprints of dinosaurs.

Landward of the mangrove-lined creeks along the eastern shore are bare flats that are only flooded on high spring tides, with the hypersaline soil inhibiting the establishment of vegetation, except for some areas of samphire.

The landward side is also known as Roebuck Plain with a pastoral lease of the name Roebuck Plains Station situated on the land.

=== Climate ===
Roebuck Bay experiences a hot semi-arid climate (Köppen, Bsh). The wet season spans the austral summer, with most of the year's annual precipitation falling during this period, primarily in the form of severe tropical thunderstorms. The lengthier dry season occupies the remainder of the year, typically from May to November, when the temperatures are slightly cooler yet still very warm, and rainfall is extremely light and rare to nearly non-existent. Annual precipitation totals vary locally across the bay; they range from 300 to 550 mm a year. High temperatures during the oppressive austral summer months that frequently exceed 38 °C (100 °F), coupled with uncomfortably high humidity, contribute to often sweltering conditions from November to March, with the highest temperatures and most oppressive humidity typically experienced in February in and around the bay.

=== Tides ===
The bay has a very large tidal range which exposes around 160 km^{2} of mudflats, 45% of the total bay area, with the tide edge travelling at up to 20 cm per second. Most of the mudflats are inundated each high tide; spring tides or cyclones may also flood adjoining coastal flats. The tidal system is semi-diurnal with an average amplitude of 5.7 m, varying from 1 m on neap tides to 10.5 m on the highest spring tides. These tidal conditions dominate the intertidal ecology.

== History ==
Roebuck Bay lies in the traditional country of the Jukun and Yawuru Aboriginal peoples. The bay was important for seasonal meetings, exchanging gifts, arranging marriages and settling disputes. Many shellfish middens, marking former camping sites, are visible along the coastal cliffs and dunes. Indigenous people continue to make extensive use of the bay's natural resources by gathering shellfish, fishing and hunting.

=== Dutch massacre ===
In 1942 several Dutch flying boats arrived with refugees from the Dutch East Indies. While lying at anchor in this bay they were attacked by Japanese Mitsubishi A6M Zero fighter planes on 3 March 1942. The flying boats were defenceless and were repeatedly attacked and sprayed with bullets from machine guns. A hundred men, women and children were killed, many of them drowned; others were incinerated by the burning fuel on the surface of the water. The wrecks are still in situ, and several are visible a few days each year at extreme low tide.

On 7 June 1990 some 34,219 ha of the bay and its immediate surrounds were designated as a wetland of international importance, Ramsar Site 479, under the Ramsar Convention.

== Flora and fauna ==
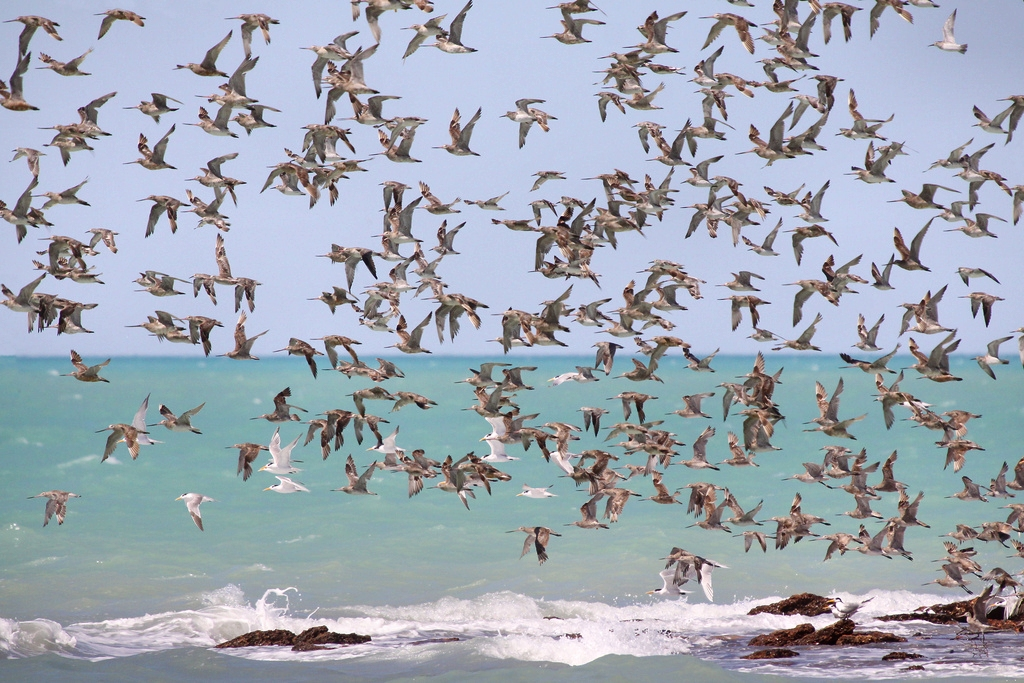
Waders in flight across Roebuck Bay

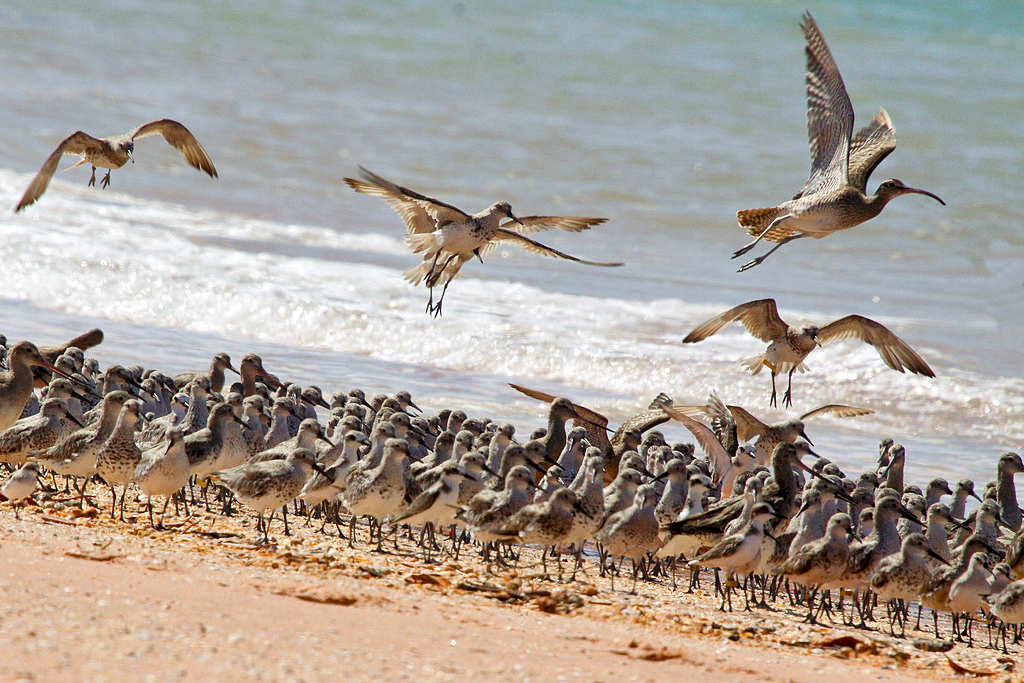
Waders roosting on Campsite Beach, Roebuck Bay

Eleven mangrove species are found in Roebuck Bay. The mangrove swamps that line the eastern and southern edges of the bay and extend into the tidal creeks are important nursery areas for marine fish and crustaceans, particularly prawns. Extensive seagrass beds across the bay are feeding grounds for dugongs and green turtles. Other marine turtles and dolphins also regularly use the bay.

=== Waders ===
The intertidal mud and sand flats support high densities of benthic invertebrates, providing a key food source for waders or shorebirds. The site is one of the most important migration staging, and non-breeding, areas for waders in Australia and within the East Asian – Australasian Flyway. It is a principal spring arrival site in August–October for large proportions of the Australian populations of many species, and especially for the larger ones that travel non-stop from China to Australia. There is high turnover due to the birds moving onwards to south-western and south-eastern Australia, though large numbers remain through summer, and smaller numbers of non-breeding birds stay through winter. The area is also important for the northward movement of waders in autumn, with massed daytime departures taking place in March–April. The total number of waders using the bay each year is estimated to be over 300,000. The northern beaches of the bay, as well as Bush Point, provide important high tide roost sites.

The bay's wader feeding habitats and roosting sites have been identified by BirdLife International as a 928 km^{2} Important Bird Area (IBA). The IBA also encompasses the low-lying, occasionally inundated, coastal grasslands to the east of the bay on Roebuck Plains Station, including Lake Eda, where many waders roost during very high tides.

The bay regularly supports more than 1% of the population of at least 22 wader species: greater sand plover, lesser sand plover, oriental plover, red-capped plover, grey plover, bar-tailed godwit, black-tailed godwit, red knot, great knot, red-necked stint, curlew sandpiper, sanderling, eastern curlew, little curlew, Eurasian whimbrel, common greenshank, common redshank, grey-tailed tattler, Terek sandpiper, ruddy turnstone, Asian dowitcher, and pied oystercatcher.

== Access and usage ==
Broome is a major tourist destination, and Roebuck Bay is used for recreational and tourism activities such as fishing, sightseeing and birdwatching. Broome Bird Observatory conducts shorebird research and public education.In November 2022 a 112 metre jetty opened on the site of the original 900 metre jetty.

== Transport and communications ==
In the 1890s, Roebuck Bay was the terminus of a proposed but unrealised land grant railway from Angle Pole across the border in the Northern Territory.

Roebuck Bay, with its sheltered waters, was the site chosen for the undersea telegraph cable from Asia to come ashore in 1871, to continue overland to Perth.
