= Yawuru =

Indigenous people of Western Australia

The Yawuru, also spelt Jawuru, are an Aboriginal Australian people of the Kimberley region of Western Australia.

== Language ==
A Japanese linguist, Hosokawa Kōmei (細川弘明), compiled the first basic dictionary of the Yawuru language in 1988, and followed it up with a comprehensive descriptive grammar in 2011.

== Country ==
Their territory, much of it of open saltmarsh, encompasses the area from the eastern shores of Roebuck Bay south of Roebuck Plains through to the southern end of Thangoo Station and within 5 miles of Cape Villaret. Their inland extension ran close to Dampier Downs. Norman Tindale's overall estimate of their territory posits a domain of roughly 2,100 square miles (5,400 km^{2}).

Their neighbouring tribes were the Jukan to the north, and, running clockwise, the Warrwa northeast, the Nyigina on the eastern hinterland, and on their southern frontier the Karajarri. The border with the latter is marked by an ecological transition from the coastal saltmarsh plains to the dense, sandy pindan scrubland occupied by the Karajarri.

== Social structure and beliefs ==
The Yawuru people in Broome also include the Djugun and the two are distinguished only by minor dialectal differences.

In Yawuru cosmology, the primordial time and its world is still present in its creative force, governing social relations, informing the way one interacts with the maritime and continental landscape within their traditional territory, and securing the well-being of the community. The traditional kinship structure, typical also of other contiguous tribal groups such as the Karajarri, Nyikina and Mangala, is fourfold, consisting of the Banaga and the Burungu, the Garimba and the Barrjarri, the first two in each case form the binary unit of optimal marriage choice. Children assume their kin-tribal identity through the mother. Thus, a child born to a Banaga father and a Burungu woman is classified as Barrjarri, while a Garimba woman married to a Barrjarri man produces Banaga offspring.

== Ecology ==
The Yawuru recognize six seasons in the year: Barrgana, Wirlburu, Laja, Marrul, Wirralburu and Man-gala. The dry cold season (Barrgana) coincides with a change of fishing from the open sea to the native salmon in creeks; after a brief transitional phase (Wirlburu), the Laja period, encompassing September to November, kicks in, called "married turtle time" where abundance caches of eggs can be harvested from the beaches, and reef fishing feasible. The humid Marrul period follows, when one fishes for whiting, trevally, queenfish and mullet.

== Traditional food ==
The Yawuru are a coastal people whose basic diet consisted of seafood – fish, turtles, stingrays, dugong, crabs and mangrove shells – but also sand monitors, flying foxes, and bush food foraged in the semi-arid pindan scrub country, divided into edible bush fruits for which they have over 90 terms, covering such things as wattle seed and native tubers, to wallabies, goanna and varieties of birds from native hens and crested pigeons to the bush turkey. Maritime fruits were prepared, after fermentation, by heating them in a baler shell over hot coals.

Maritime hunting technology consisted of fishing spears, fishing boomerangs, fish-stunning poisons, nets made of massed grass sheaves shoved through waters to corner fish, and by building rock ponds fenced with stakes fashioned from mangrove wood, whose base was woven with spinifex to trap fish in the tidal outflows. The timing for hunting stingrays was signaled by the onset of nyalnyala blossoms from a guardo tree, which corresponded seasonally with the period of stingray fattening.

== Modern period ==
The Yawuru now predominantly live in Broome, which was built on traditional Djugun lands. Locally descendants of both groups self-identify as being one traditional group – "Jugun and Yawuru are one" – and consider the land of both as one single unit, with the majority of Djugun families assimilated into the Yawuru.

== Native title ==
Following a Federal Court decision by Justice Ron Merkel in 2010, the Yawuru people became one of the native title holders of the Western Australian town of Broome, including pockets of land in and around the townsite and two pastoral stations.

== Alternative names ==
- Djauor
- Gawor
- Jaoro, Jauro
- Jawuru, (Mangala exonym)
- Kakudu-Kakudu (idem)
- Nawudu (also used to designate the Karajarri)
- Yaoro, Yauro
- Yaroro
- Yauera
- Yauor/Jauor
- Yawur

Source: Tindale 1974, p. 243

== Prominent Yawuru ==
- Mick Dodson
- Pat Dodson
- Alan Pigram
- Stephen Pigram
- Mitch Torres

== Sources ==
- "AIATSIS map of Indigenous Australia". AIATSIS. 10 January 2021.
- Burke, Paul (2011). Law's Anthropology: From Ethnography to Expert Testimony in Native Title. Australian National University. pp. 101–172. ISBN 978-1-921-86243-4.
- Glowczewski, Barbara (1998). "The meaning of 'One' in Broome, Western Australia: From Yawuru tribe to Rubibi Corporation". Aboriginal History. 22: 203–222. ISBN 978-1-743-32389-2. JSTOR 24046167.
- Hosokawa, Komei (1988). Classified Yawuru dictionary. Broome.
- Hosokawa, Komei (2011). Dixon, Robert M. W. (ed.). The Yawuru language of West Kimberley: a meaning-based description. Outstanding grammars from Australia. Australian National University. ISBN 978-3-862-88093-5.
- Jones, David; Beza, Beau B. (2016). "An Indigenous Perspective on Sustainability Citizenship". In Horne, Ralph; Fien, John; Beza, Beau B.; Nelson, Anitra (eds.). Sustainability Citizenship in Cities: Theory and practice. Routledge. pp. 150–161. ISBN 978-1-317-39107-4.
- "NNTT" (PDF). Yawuru Native Title Holders Aboriginal Corporation RNTBC. 2010. Archived from the original (PDF) on 16 February 2017.
- Sullivan, Patrick (2014) [First published 1998]. "Salt water, fresh water and Yawuru social organization". In Peterson, Nicolas; Rigsby, Bruce (eds.). Customary marine tenure in Australia. Sydney University Press. pp. 159–179. ISBN 978-1-743-32389-2.
- "Tindale Tribal Boundaries" (PDF). Department of Aboriginal Affairs, Western Australia. September 2016. Archived from the original (PDF) on 8 March 2016.
- Tindale, Norman Barnett (1974). "Jawuru (WA)". Aboriginal Tribes of Australia: Their Terrain, Environmental Controls, Distribution, Limits, and Proper Names. Australian National University Press. ISBN 978-0-708-10741-6. Archived from the original on 20 March 2020.
- Torres, Mamanyjun Pat (2006). "Nila. Ngany-Possessing/Belonging to Knowledge: Indigenous Knowledge Systems in Yawuru Aboriginal Australia". In Kunnie, Julian E.; Goduka, Nomalungela I. (eds.). Indigenous Peoples' Wisdom and Power: Affirming Our Knowledge Through Narratives. Ashgate Publishing. pp. 19–31. ISBN 978-0-754-61597-2.
- "Yawuru". Nyamba Buru Yawuru. 2016.
- "Yawuru Seasons". Nyamba Buru Yawuru. 2013.
- Yu, Sarah (1999). Ngapa Kunangkul: Living Water. University of Western Australia.
