= Jugun =

Aboriginal Australian people

The Djukun (also spelt Jukun, Tjunung) are an Aboriginal Australian people of the Kimberley region of Western Australia.

Writing in 1974, Norman Tindale stated that by this time the Djukun had become almost extinct. However, the Djukun and their descendants continue to live on their ancestral homelands known as Jirr-ngin-ngan or Broome.

Located in the north west of Western Australia, is the coastal town of Jirr-ngin-ngan or Broome. Djukun country is most famous for the red sand, the sandy beaches and the turquoise waters of the Indian Ocean.

== Country ==
Djukun traditional lands extended over some 400 square miles (1,000 km^{2}) along the northern coast of Roebuck Bay, up the coast to Willie Creek. Their lands reached inland roughly 15 miles.

== Language ==
The Daisy Bates Collection based at the University of Adelaide contains a comprehensive and substantial body of research on Indigenous Australians from Western Australia including Broome. Dating back more than a century this collection holds information about the Djukun language.

== Modern Period ==
Despite the Rubibi Community v State of Western Australia Native Title Case, there is significant debate, oral histories and substantial records that verify Djukun people as the traditional owners, knowledge holders and custodians of Djukun Country (Broome)

Greg Campbell ethnographic and anthropological research spanning over 30 years demonstrates strong connections and relations between the Djukun and Goolarabooloo peoples.

The Djukun Nation is involved in several projects, research and community engagement initiatives to revive the Djukun language, reclaim their cultural identity, preserve their history and pass down knowledge to their future generations.

Filmmaker and cinematographer Cornel Ozies documents Djukun cultural heritage in the film 'Footprints'.

== Alternative names ==
- Tjugun
- Tjukun
- Djukun
- Tjugan
- Djukan
- Jukan
- Tjunung
- Kularrabulu
- Jukannganga (Note: Jukannganga etymologically signified 'Djugun speech/language')
