= Bardi people =

Indigenous people of Western Australia

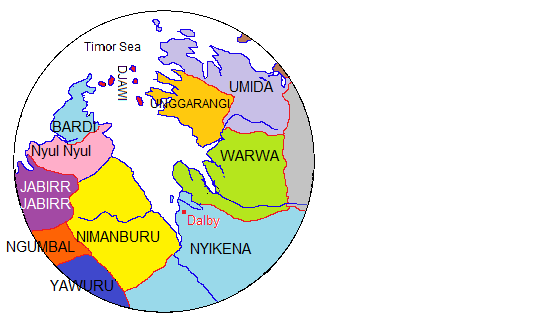
The traditional lands of Australian Aboriginal tribes around the Bardi (Note: This map is indicative only.)

The Bardi people, also spelt Baada or Baardi and other variations, (Note: The first ethnographer who spoke their language and described their life and traditions in great detail, Ernest Ailred Worms, transcribed the name as Bād (Worms 1950b, p. 641).) are an Aboriginal Australian people, living north of Broome and inhabiting parts of the Dampier Peninsula in the Kimberley region of Western Australia. They are ethnically close to the Jawi people, and several organisations refer to the Bardi Jawi grouping, such as the Bardi Jawi Niimidiman Aboriginal Corporation Registered Native Title Body and the Bardi Jawi Rangers.

== Language ==
The Bardi language is a non-Pama-Nyungan tongue, the most northerly variety of the Nyulnyulan language family. It is mutually intelligible with Jawi. It is the best known Nyulnyulan language, and a detailed grammar of the language exists, written by Claire Bowern.

The Pallotine priest and linguist, Hermann Nekes, who worked with Ernst Alfred Worms in compiling dictionaries of Baardi and related languages, found his informants to be extremely linguistically astute. In an interview in 1938, a journalist writes of him and the Baardi/Jawi area informants as follows

In a little stone house at Beagle Bay, with a creek running beside it and the sea only five miles away, he has been living and working with nine aborigines, studying their tongues. Every day he and the aborigines sat in a circle round the one big table in the house. Dr. Nekes asked them questions, and from their replies was able to compare their answers on the spot. The strangest feature of these linguistic knights of the round table was that no two of them spoke the same tongue. As the days became weeks and the weeks months, Dr. Nekes became the central figure in one of the oddest language experiments in scientific history. The aborigines began to understand every word that every other aborigine said. At first some of them had used what Dr. Nekes calls a kind of 'pidgin-black.' Now they were all coming to terms. At this stage, some of the brightest of them gave Dr. Nekes a shock. They began to use grammatical terms and hold almost scientific discussions on syntax. Some further months at the round table, and they were dealing with phonetic symbols, explaining fine points of pronunciation, elucidating the differences between dialects that were generally similar, and even giving Dr. Nekes a hand with his job of finding the best written representation of the different tongues (Note: However, the method had its flaws. Bowern writes: "Another flaw in the data in Nekes and Worms (1953) is their attribution of various forms to the wrong language. Nekes and Worms' technique for gathering cross-linguistic data was to hold meetings with representatives from each language, and to goaround the table asking for the equivalents in each speaker's first language. Since many Aboriginal people of the Dampier land area were multilingual, this has led to words being said to be part of the lexicon of a particular language, when in fact they are not." (Bowern 2008, p. 10))

== Country ==
The Bardi's traditional land, estimated by Norman Tindale to encompass about 300 square miles (780 km^{2}), was in the Cape Leveque peninsula, extending eastwards from Cape Borda to Cygnet Bay and Cunningham Point. There are problems with this estimate, in particular with the southern borders assigned to the Bardi. The Kooljaman resort at Cape Leveque is run by Bardi people.

== Seasons ==
The Bardi divide their year up into six seasons whose time length varies:

- mankal is the monsoonal wet period, (Note: A. P. Elkin defined the wet season, called erelp, as the one wherein the rites of initiation were held, and the dates for these ceremonies he observed were from late February to early March, corresponding with ngaladany, for which see below (Elkin 1935, p. 191).) usually a few weeks in January or early February, when food is scarce but turtle eggs can be gathered.
- ngaladany follows, a windless humid period from late February through to early March.
- iralboo is the hot season of swelling tides in April and May, with fruit burgeoning, and reefing possible. Mosquitoes thrive, and influence where one will camp.
- barrgan is marked by cold and strong southeasterlies blowing in, from May to August. The onset marks the best time for hunting dugong.
- jalalay from September to October is characterized by westerlies, the end of dugong hunts and the best time to catch the fattened stingray
- lalin, the season when turtles mate and can be hunted, begins with November, which also affords an abundance of wild bush apple. It is hot, as humidity rises, and northwesterlies blow in, with tropical storms towards the end.

== Religion and spirituality ==
The heartland of Baardi (and Jawi) religious thought and practice lies in an area some 3 miles southwest of Cape Leveque, called Ngamagun (at the water)/Urgu (water). It is there that many of the key moments of the primordial creation of their world, in what they call būar or the dreaming, are grounded.

The oldest supernatural beings in the Dampier peninsula thought-world were, firstly, Galalaṇ, followed by Minau. At some time, a young culture hero, Djamar emerged from the sea at Bulgin (Note: A variant has Djamar emerge from a hole in the ground at Swan Point, dally there for a long time then trek south, making some bullroarers, without thread holes (kalakor), After the fish incident, he pours his blood into a wooden dish (gurndu)and when it dried into cakes, he cut and ate them (Elkin 1935, pp. 200–201).) and, after resting against a paperbark tree for three days, struck out, whirling his bullroarer, for the south, then dived back into the sea after turning west, only to emerge at Ngamagun creek. Going into the bush he cut down a silver-blood tree, and split boards from it, which he fashioned into bullroarers that, as he went back at his campsite on the shore, he shoved into the stone-beds of the creek, forming a line of galaguru. He then walked on to Djarindjin where, while seated on a rock, his hand was stung by a rock-fish he had caught underneath it. He found the blood tasty as he licked the wound, and stopped it with a wooden plug. (Note: The word is also used for the stopper used to stem the outflow of blood from the Basilic vein which is cut when young men are undergoing the fifth stage (djodor) of initiation (Worms 1952, p. 542).) Returning to Ngamagun, he let the blood from his arm drip into a trough of stone. This blood became his food, which he shared with his three unmothered sons: Nalja, Winindjibi and Glabi, and the ritual drink of Baardi men to this day. The three sons took different directions, with Nalja travelling east with the tjuringa, Winindjibi went south introducing initiation rituals and dancing, while Glabi introduced the Law.

He speared another fish at high tide and sang his way back to Ngamagun, collecting his galaguru and, on climbing the Burumar sandhill, swung it round while kneeling. The hair-string broke as he did so, and the bullroarer shot skyward, to rest at a celestial zone called 'With the Fleshless' (baug-ara-njara), i.e., at the realm of the dead, in the Coalsack Nebula, a dark spot near the Southern Cross. After his death, Djamar himself went to the Coalsack Nebula, and his presence may be represented by BZ Crucis.

Galalaṇ (perhaps "belonging to the long-ago"), was the primordial figure who endowed the landscape with names from the Bardi language as he traipsed all over what became their territory. He was an upright being, easily incensed by signs of greed in the allotment of food. He died when, angered by such behaviour, he channelled inland lake waters to the sea to allow fish and turtles to escape into the ocean and was speared by the outraged people at Gumiri, a waterhole located at Swan Point on the northernmost sector of the Dampier peninsula, and then thrown into the sea where he floated, and is known by the name of Lulul/Lular (sharkman). He ascended to the realm of the dead (Baugaranjara) where it covers and arc of 33°. The exact celestial coordinates are as follows:

His figure can still be seen in the darker parts of the Milky Way, on both sides of a line drawn from Alpha Centauri to Alpha Scorpionis, Antares. His right foot rests near 113 G of Lupus, and his left foot near Lambda and Upsilon Scorpionis. He bears on his head the feather of white cockatoo, identified with the bright star, Alpha Centauri, and that of an owl represented by the darker Beta Centauri. The whole figure extends over an arc of 33°.'

Minau (perhaps "old timer"), the second creator figure, is associated with innovations that are viewed as negative compared the customs laid down by the predecessor Galalaṇ. He was polygamous, invented obscene dances, and introduced painful practices like circumcision and subincision into initiatory rituals (ololoṇ). The changes he wrought were associated with the transformation of Baardi parkland estates into mulga scrub, perhaps with the advent of colonial cattle grazers.

A fourth figure that came into prominence in Baardi lore is Djamba. Worms found the cult dominant among the nearby Yawuru by the early 1930s, yet all absent among the Nyulnyulan speaking groups such as the Jabirr Jabirr, Nyulnyul and the Baardi, and hazarded the conjecture, with some evidence, that it came from the central Australian group, the Arrernte, via the Gugadja.

This Djamba, a prototypical figure in widespread Aboriginal lore characterized by crippled feet, is associated with the introduction of guraṇara (ritual intercourse with exchanged women) matters, tyuringa and instruments like the love bullroarer, mandagidgid; magic daggers and spindle-shaped sticks used as points (wadaṇara/durun), many associated with innovative sexually explicit corroborees and rites. (Note: Worms describes one such rite, resorting to the discretion of Latin: "Unus ex viris humi se prosternit, et aliis cantantibus membri virilis erectionem tali modo provocat ut signum antea baculo incisum attingat. Hujus baculi extrema pars glandem repraesentat. Postea (semine effuso) vir in genua erigitur et ab aliis eodem baculo verberatur. Initiatus effugit, sed reversus parvo ligno magico (mandagidgid) remuneratur." (Worms 1952, p. 557)) All this bears strong resemblances to key features of the Kunapipi ceremonies swept over northern Australia. Among the Baardi, there were those who assimilated these innovations to the Djamar cult, and others who, in deference and fealty to the moral example of the primal Dreaming spirit Galalaṇ.

Bardi people could trace their connection to figures in the Dreaming via the presence of their rai (child-soul), (Note: The word connotes 'secret, hidden, indistinct, hiding' (Worms 1952, p. 540, n.2),) which is a contemporary witness to the primordial period.

== Social organisation and economy ==
In the Dreaming, Galalan split people into two reciprocal groups, the Djando and the (Y)nar. According to Worms, Bardi marriage classes later came to accept the following division: (Note: The Banaga and Burun men have a painted sash on their right shoulder, identical to that of Djamar, while the Bardjari and Garimb have the sash painted on their left shoulders (Worms 1952, p. 542).)

Male	Marries	Children are
(M) Banaga	(F)	
(M) Burun	(F)	
(M) Bardjari	(F)	
(M) Garimb	(F)	

According to elderly informants however these divisions were recent, and were introduced from Lagrange by the mytho-cultural protagonist Djamba, perhaps alluding to a shift in customs that took place around the 1870s.

Claire Bowern states that the Baardi, unlike many Kimberley groups, do not employ to this purpose the section and subsection names almost ubiquitous elsewhere in the region. Generally the kinship classificatory system among them conforms to the Arrernte type, which is that also used among the Nyigina and Nyulnyul. In such a system there are 4 distinct terms for the grandparents' generation, and cross-cousin marriage, with some exceptions in second-cousin marriages, is prohibited.

Bowern states that the primary division, alluded to by Worms – djando and the (Y)nar, – now transcribed as jarndoo and inar(a) – refer to two generational moieties. If one is jarndoo, all members of one's harmonic generation (brothers/sisters/cousins/second cousins, together with those of one's grandparents' and grandchildren's generation) are also within that typology. Likewise, inar(a) groups those people within one's parents' or children's generation. Marriage is only lawful between those who are jarndoo to each other.

Only medicine men had a totem animal (banmin), whose presence was thought to carry the implication that one would die earlier that most other Bardi people. The ideal was to take only one wife ideally, with polygamy (as allowed by the ololou custom) frowned on.

The Bardi were a maritime, coastal people, composed of five groups. They crafted pegged mangrove logs from a light buoyant variety which they got in trade from the Jawi people of Sunday Island to form rafts to venture out to the sea to hunt, and to visit the outlying islands.

As with the Jawi, the Bardi defined land rights in terms of four kinds of relationship:

- Ownership of a patrilineal estate (booroo) by virtue of patrilineal descent
- A right of access to the patrilineal estate of one's mother (ningalmoo)
- Rights stemming from the site associated with one's conception totem (raya)
- Rights that derive from customary usage and intermarriage

== Ceremonies ==
=== Ilma ===
The term "ilma" refers both to a type of Bardi ceremonies, or performance, and to the objects used to teach stories, songs and customary law in these ceremonies. The objects have been described as "performance symbols of Bardi law and custom, which tell stories of the lands and seas of the Dampier Peninsula". Ilma ceremonies are for public performance.

The Australian National Maritime Museum has over 1,000 ilma, although these were still unavailable for public viewing in 2018.

=== Initiation ===
Initiations must be conducted in the wet season, and are announced by a messenger who announces to each group there is a angui inlandjen amba (ceremony to make man).

The ceremony's first ritual phase is called kundaldja, in which, over several evenings the neminem novice or initiand has his body smeared with charcoal and turtle oil by his tribal sister's husband (alabel), who acts as his guardian and supporter. Songs taught to the tribe by Minau are sung, to the rhythm of boomerang beating, as various dances are performed, and women joke and sometimes dress up, even as men. They are ignored by the male choir. Some male affines (relatives by marriage) visit the circumcision site and draw blood from their subincised penises, which must trickle down their thighs to the ground. The latter is repeated on several occasions thereafter; the reason given is that the men must hurt themselves because shortly they must hurt the boy.

The second stage consists of tooth avulsion, in which the corroboree ground is marked out by three parallel lines, 2 feet (0.61 m) apart, and a rug placed before the third, behind which is the djungagor (medicine man) and the boy's tribal mother's brother. The hunched novice, each time a waddy (club) is thumped, must hop from one line to the next, and then sit, his arms bent from the elbow so the hands reach his shoulders, a position his guardian clasps him in. The djungagor would use native possum twice to bind the teeth and separate them from the gums. The two front teeth, against which a stick was placed, were then knocked out by hammering the other end of the stick with a stone. The mother and other women present weep, and run away. He is then painted all over with red ochre, with white strips on his chest and stomach, black ones on his back. He is now known as a lainyar.

== History of contact ==
Norman Tindale thought that the Bardi were probably those described by William Dampier. Dampier arrived in the privateer Cygnet off this coast on 5 January 1688, and remained there doing repairs until 12 March. This has been identified as, in all probability, Karrakatta Bay in King Sound, now Ardyaloon (also known as One Arm Point). The ancestors of the Bardi were thus probably the first native Australian people described by Western explorers.

Toby Metcalfe, a linguist who has studied the Bardi language, suggested that Dampier's report of his encounter with the natives of the bay contained a word which was still recognisable from the Bardi lexicon.

At our first coming, before we were acquainted with them or they with us, a company of them who lived on the main came just against our ship, and, standing on a pretty high bank, threatened us with their swords and lances by shaking them at us: at last the captain ordered the drum to be beaten, which was done of a sudden with much vigour, purposely to scare the poor creatures. They hearing the noise ran away as fast as they could drive; and when they ran away in haste they would cry Gurry, gurry, speaking deep in the throat.

Metcalfe argued that, indisputably, the word repeated here, as transcribed as gurri was in fact ngaarri, the "most feared and fickle" of the Bardi malevolent spirit-beings. Thus, by an historical irony, it emerged that Dampier, who wrote down notoriously in his journal that the inhabitants of Bardi territory were "the miserablest people in the world", was considered in turn by the Bardi as the "miserablest" and "nastiest" of evil spirits.

Several missions were set up on the Dampier Peninsula in the late 19th century. The Sunday Island mission was established in 1899 by two pearlers, Sidney Hadley and Harry Hunter, whose fleet of luggers worked out of Bulgin, east of Cape Leveque and just north of its lighthouse. This was later affiliated with the UAM, one of whose missionaries, Wilfrid Henry Douglas, settled there in 1946, learning the Bardi language and attempting to translate some passages in the New Testament into the local tongue.

After the mission was dismantled in 1962 the Bardi were shifted to Derby and Lombadina. When part of a pastoral lease of Lombardina was split off, the Bardi shifted back to take up residence at One Arm Point, where by the early 2000s, some 400 people dwell.

== Native title and current Bardi Jawi land ==
After a landmark 2002 High Court decision confirmed the primacy of the Native Title Act 1993, the Bardi and Jawi people managed to obtain recognition of their native title claim in 2005, when a Federal Court under Justice French ruled that they were entitled to exclusive rights over some areas of the roughly 1,000 square kilometres (400 mi^{2}) to which they had laid claim. They also sought to claim a small section of Brue Reef, 31 miles north of Cape Leveque. Justice French ruled in June 2015 affirmed part of their claim, while adding they had non-exclusive native title rights over areas below the mean high water mark. The Brue Reef claim was dismissed.

Many of the Bardi and Jawi peoples now live at One Arm Point (Ardyaloon), Djarindjin and Lombadina.

The Bardi Jawi Niimidiman Aboriginal Corporation Registered Native Title Body administers land, and in consultation with several other bodies and individuals, including the Australian Government Department of Sustainability, Environment, Water, Population and Communities, produced the Bardi Jawi Indigenous Protected Area Management Plan 2013–2023.

== Bardi Jawi Marine Park ==
As of 2020, there is a proposal for a 660,000-hectare (1,600,000-acre) marine park, which will cover the Indian Ocean surrounding the Dampier Peninsula, including the many islands of the Buccaneer Archipelago. There will be three marine parks: the Lalang-gaddam Marine Park covers Camden Sound, Horizontal Falls and two other parks in Dambeemangarddee waters to the north; the Mayala Marine Park will cover the Buccaneer islands, the land and waters of the Mayala group; the Bardi Jawi Marine Park is the most southerly of the three. Each will be jointly managed by the local traditional owner groups.

== Notable people ==
- Stephen "Baamba" Albert (born 1950 in Broome, died in Perth 13 November 2019) was a Bardi actor and singer who was also the first chairman of the National Aboriginal Education Committee and was the director of Goolarri Media.
- Jimmy Chi (born 1948 in Broome, died in Broome 26 July 2017) was a playwright of Bardi descent on his mother's side (Scottish-Bardi). His father was of mixed Chinese and Japanese descent.

== Indigenous rangers ==
The Bardi Jawi Rangers, an Indigenous ranger group established in 2006, are based at Ardyaloon. The ranger programme helps to sustain traditional owners' livelihoods and their connection to country. They cover 250 kilometres (160 mi) of coastline and 340 hectares (840 acres) of land, performing valuable cultural and natural resource management activities such as managing the dugong turtle population, recording their traditional ecological knowledge and undertaking collaborative research. The group has eight full-time rangers, and in 2008 won the Banksia Environment Award.

A bird identified as a Nicobar pigeon, native to South East Asia and the South Pacific, was spotted by the Rangers on the Dampier Peninsula in May 2017. As part of biosecurity measures, it was reported to quarantine services and removed by Australian Department of Agriculture officials.

== Alternative names ==
There are several alternative spellings in the literature on Bardi:

- Ba:d
- Baada, Barda, Bardi, Bad
- Baardi
- Bad
- Bard

The preferred spelling is Bardi or Baardi (which represents the long vowel of the name more accurately).

=== Some words and expressions ===
- aamba-nyarr oorany (married woman) (Note: lit.aamba(man)+nyarr(comitative)+oorany(woman) (Bowern 2012, p. 246))
- aamba (man)
- aarli (fish, though more generic, and can also mean 'meat', as in aarli-mayi (meat-plant food=food))
- goorlil (turtle)
- noomoonjoo (seaweed)
- nyirroogoordoo minkal (how are you?)
- wangalang (young man)

== Sources ==
- "Aborigine Is Better Grammarian". The Mail (Adelaide). 30 July 1938. p. 8 – via Trove.
- "AIATSIS map of Indigenous Australia". AIATSIS. 10 January 2021.
- "Bardi Jawi". Country Needs People. 1 August 2018.
- Bardi Jawi Indigenous Protected Area Management Plan 2013–2023 (PDF) (Report). Bardi Jawi Niimidiman Aboriginal Corporation Registered Native Title Body. 2012.
- "Bardi Jawi rangers discover Nicobar pigeon". Kimberley Land Council. 5 May 2017.
- Bird, W. H. (1910). "Some Remarks on the Grammatical Construction of the Chowie-Language, as Spoken by the Buccaneer Islanders, North-Western Australia". Anthropos. 5 (5): 454–456. JSTOR 40443562.
- Bird, W. H. (1911). "Ethnographical Notes about the Buccaneer Islanders, North Western Australia". Anthropos. 6 (1): 174–178. JSTOR 40444080.
- Bowern, Claire (2008). "History of research on Bardi and Jawi". In McGregor, William (ed.). Encountering Aboriginal languages: studies in the history of Australian linguistics. Pacific Linguistics Research School of Pacific and Asian Studies. pp. 59–84. ISBN 978-0-85883-582-5.
- Bowern, Claire (2012). A Grammar of Bardi. Walter de Gruyter. ISBN 978-3-11-027818-7.
- Bowern, Claire (2016). "Language and land in the Northern Kimberley" (PDF). In Peter, K. Austin; Koch, Harold; Simpson, Jane (eds.). Language, land & song: Studies in honour of Luise Hercus. EL Publishing. pp. 277–286. ISBN 978-0-7286-0406-3.
- Chadwick, Stephen Robert; Paviour-Smith, Martin (2016). The Great Canoes in the Sky: Starlore and Astronomy of the South Pacific. Springer. ISBN 978-3-319-22623-1.
- Coate, H. H. J. (December 1966). "The Eai and the Third Eye North-West Australian Beliefs". Oceania. 37 (2): 93–123. doi:10.1002/j.1834-4461.1966.tb01790.x. JSTOR 40329629.
- Collins, Ben; Mills, Vanessa (5 May 2017). "Dodo's relative, Nicobar pigeon, found in north-west Australia's Kimberley region". ABC News.
- Collins, Ben; Tomlin, Sam; Mills, Vanessa (16 November 2019). "Bran Nue Dae's Stephen 'Baamba' Albert remembered for acting, music and helping Indigenous Australians". ABC News.
- Dampier, William (1859). Major, Richard Henry (ed.). Early Voyages to Terra Australis. Hakluyt Society. p. 106 – via Internet Archive.
- Douglas, Rob (2014). He Speaks Our Language. Ark House Press. ISBN 978-0-9925192-7-8.
- Elkin, A.P. (1935). "Initiation in the Bard tribe, North-West Australia". Journal and Proceedings of the Royal Society of New South Wales. 69 (2): 190–208. doi:10.5962/p.360137. S2CID 259733240 – via BHL.
- "High Court affirms primacy of the Native Title Act". National Native Title Tribunal. 8 August 2002.
- "Kooljaman at Cape Leveque". Kooljaman. com. 2016.
- Kormendy, Nicolette (8 September 2004). "Bardi and Jawi people seek native title recognition over reef and waters north of Cape Leveque". National Native Title Tribunal.
- Logan, Tyne (27 December 2020). "WA marine park draft plan to protect traditional methods and cultural practices". ABC News.
- Mailer, Robert; Collins, Ben (15 October 2013). "Discovering the other man behind Broome's William Dampier memorial". ABC News.
- McGregor, William B. (2007). "Hermann Nekes and Ernest Worms's "Australian Languages"". Anthropos. 102 (1): 99–114. doi:10.5771/0257-9774-2007-1-99. JSTOR 40466792.
- McGregor, William B. (2013). The Languages of the Kimberley, Western Australia. Routledge. ISBN 978-1-134-39602-3.
- Metcalfe, Christopher Douglas (1979). "Some aspects of the Bardi language: a non-technical description". In Berndt, R. M.; Berndt, C. H. (eds.). Aborigines of the West: their past and their present. University of Western Australia Press. pp. 197–213. ISBN 978-0-85564-145-0.
- Powell, Graeme (27 June 2017). "Jimmy Chi: Bran Nue Dae playwright, award-winning Indigenous 'WA treasure' dies". ABC News.
- Preston, Diana; Preston, Michael (2010). A Pirate Of Exquisite Mind: The Life Of William Dampier. Random House. ISBN 978-1-4464-2918-1.
- Proposed Bardi Jawi Marine Park indicative joint management plan 2020 (PDF). Department of Biodiversity, Conservation and Attractions (WA). 2020. ISBN 978-1-925978-17-9. "prepared by the Conservation and Parks Commission through the agency of the Department of Biodiversity, Conservation and Attractions (DBCA) in consultation with Bardi and Jawi Traditional Owners"
- "Proposed marine parks in the Buccaneer Archipelago and surrounds". DPAW.
- "Roy Wiggan". Biennale of Sydney.
- Spittle, Deborah (24 March 2010). "Bardi and Jawi appeal upheld". Government of Australia. Archived from the original on 27 August 2010.
- Sweeney, Dominique (2 January 2019). "What is the Australian National Maritime Museum Ilma collection?". Archives and Manuscripts. 47 (1): 153–163. doi:10.1080/01576895.2019.1570283. ISSN 0157-6895. S2CID 167135188.
- "Tindale Tribal Boundaries" (PDF). Department of Aboriginal Affairs, Western Australia. September 2016. Archived from the original (PDF) on 8 March 2016.
- Tindale, Norman Barnett (1974). "Baada (WA)". Aboriginal Tribes of Australia: Their Terrain, Environmental Controls, Distribution, Limits, and Proper Names. Australian National University. ISBN 978-0-7081-0741-6. Archived from the original on 20 March 2020.
- Wahlquist, Calla (5 May 2017). "Pigeon related to dodo found on Australian mainland for first time". The Guardian.
- Wilson-Clark, Charlie (10 June 2005). "Bardi and Jawi people rewarded after long struggle". National Native Title Tribunal.
- Wilson-Clark, Charlie (30 November 2015). "Native title recognised in the Kimberley". National Native Title Tribunal.
- Worms, E. A. (January–June 1950a). "Feuer und Feuerzeuge in Sage und Brauch der Nordwest-Australier". Anthropos. 45 (1/3): 145–164. JSTOR 40450834.
- Worms, E. A. (December 1950b). "Djamar, the Creator. A Myth of the Bād (West Kimberley, Australia)". Anthropos. 45 (4/6): 641–658. JSTOR 40449333.
- Worms, E. A. (May–August 1952). "Djamar and His Relation to Other Culture Heroes". Anthropos. 47 (3/4): 539–560. JSTOR 40449676.
- Worms, E. A. (1957). "Australian Mythological Terms: Their Etymology and Dispersion". Anthropos. 52 (5/6): 732–768. JSTOR 40453110.
- Worms, E. A. (1959). "Verbannungslied eines australischen Wildbeuters. Ein Beitrag zur Lyrik der Bād". Anthropos. 54 (1/2): 154–168. JSTOR 40454331.
