= Jawi people =

Indigenous Australian people of the Kimberley coast of Western Australia

The Jawi people, also spelt Djaui, Djawi, and other alternative spellings, are an Aboriginal Australian people of the Kimberley coast of Western Australia, who speak the Jawi dialect. They are sometimes grouped with the Bardi people and referred to as "Bardi Jawi", as the languages and culture are similar.

== Language ==
The Jawi dialect belongs to the western branch of the non-Pama-Nyungan, Nyulnyulan family. It is similar to Bardi.

== Social and economic organisation ==
The Jawi have historically been seafaring traders. The Unggarrangu furnished them with mandjilal wood for their catamarans, and the Jawi in turn supplied the Bardi with this buoyant mangrove timber for the Bardi people's log rafts. They in turn bartered shells in return for wooden spears from the inland Warwa and Njikena tribes.

Jawi and Bardi people have historically shared the same kinship system, social organisation and law. This closeness led them to form one single group for their native title claim.

== Country ==
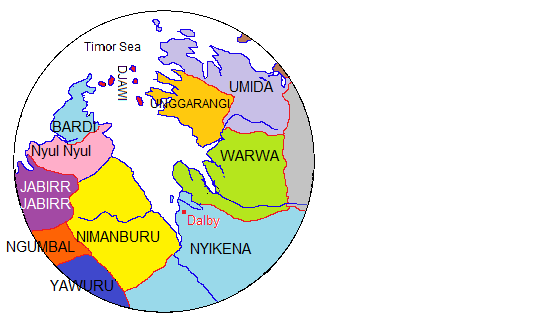
Traditional lands of Aboriginal tribes around Derby, WA

Jawi traditional lands encompass Sunday Island (Ewenu) (= Iwany) in the King Sound and the wider archipelago.

Norman Tindale estimated that the traditional lands of the Jawi (Iwany-oon, meaning "Sunday Islanders") encompassed about 50 square miles (130 km^{2}) of territory: including Sunday Island and Tohau-i (probably = Jawi), and extending to West Roe Island in the north and to Jackson Island (also called Jayirri or Tyra Island) in the west. However, there are problems with Tindale's estimates about territories in this region.

Historical maps are vague about the ownership of islands in this area.

In 1972 the Jawi and Bardi community of One Arm Point was established on the Bardi mainland.

In 2005 and 2015 the Jawi and Bardi people obtained partial recognition of their collective native title claim.

== History of contact ==
Jawi people began to have sustained contact with non-Indigenous people in the 1880s, as pearlers came to the region's abundant pearling grounds.

Many Jawi people died during an influenza epidemic on Sunday Island in the early twentieth century: by some counts, more than two thirds of the Jawi population.

From 1905, the state government assumed guardianship of all Aboriginal children on Iwanyi/Sunday Island.

Sydney Hadley, a one-time pearler and reformed alcoholic who had spent long stints in gaol, set up a non-denominational Protestant mission on Iwanyi/Sunday Island in 1899. He was later accused of allowing traditional practices to continue and sexual misconduct, in that he allegedly was initiated into the Jawi tribe and took three Aboriginal wives. This led to him being removed temporarily by the Western Australian Chief Protector of Aborigines. However, he was later reinstated and remained in charge of the mission until 1923 when he sold the mission to Australian Aborigines Mission (AAM). In 1929, the United Aborigines Mission took over from the AAM. In 1934 the mission moved off the island to Wotjulum on the mainland near Yampi Passage and Cone Bay. By February 1937 the mission returned to Sunday Island. Towards the end of World War 2, H. H. J. Coate, who was engaged in a study of Bardi, took over the running of the mission.

Philip and Dorothy Devenish joined the mission in 1952 - 1958, working with the United Aborigines Mission. Philip was a carpenter and they lived on the island and worked with the local people on building projects (one being a school), on the boat that was the island’s link to the mainland (Orlada), and also provided assistance with basic medical care, early years education and pastoral care, until the government decided to move all people off the island. In later years Philip spoke to with great admiration of the Jawi people’s extraordinary local knowledge and ability to swim, dive, fish and guide boats through the treacherous reefs around the island.

The mission closed in 1962.

== Alternative names ==
- Chowie
- Djaoi
- Djau
- Djawi
- Ewanji, Ewenyoon, I:wanja
- Ewenu
- Tohau-i (an insular toponym referring to the main island of the Buccaneer Archipelago)
- Tohawi

Source: Tindale 1974, p. 241

== Sources ==
- "AIATSIS map of Indigenous Australia". AIATSIS. 14 May 2024.
- Bird, W. H. (1910). "Some Remarks on the Grammatical Construction of the Chowie-Language, as Spoken by the Buccaneer Islanders, North-Western Australia". Anthropos. 5 (5): 454–456. JSTOR 40443562.
- Bird, W. H. (1911). "Ethnographical Notes about the Buccaneer Islanders, North Western Australia". Anthropos. 6 (1): 174–178. JSTOR 40444080.
- Bird, W. H. (January–April 1915). "A Short Vocabulary of the Chowie-Language of the Buccaneer Islanders (Sunday Islanders), North Western Australia". Anthropos. 10/11 (1/2): 180–186. JSTOR 40442801.
- Bowern, Claire (2008). "History of research on Bardi and Jawi". In McGregor, William (ed.). Encountering Aboriginal languages: studies in the history of Australian linguistics. Pacific Linguistics Research School of Pacific and Asian Studies. pp. 59–84. ISBN 978-0-858-83582-5. Archived from the original on 5 August 2021.
- Coate, H. H. J. (December 1966). "The Rai and the Third Eye North-West Australian Beliefs". Oceania. 37 (2): 93–123. doi:10.1002/j.1834-4461.1966.tb01790.x. JSTOR 40329629.
- Elkin, A. P. (March 1932). "Social Organization in the Kimberley Division, North-Western Australia". Oceania. 2 (3): 296–333. doi:10.1002/j.1834-4461.1932.tb00031.x. JSTOR 27976150.
- Elkin, A. P. (1935). "Initiation in the Bard tribe". Journal of the Proceedings of the Royal Society of New South Wales. 69: 190–208. doi:10.5962/p.360137.
- Hunter, Ernest (1993). Aboriginal Health and History: Power and Prejudice in Remote Australia. Cambridge University Press. ISBN 978-0-521-44760-7.
- McGregor, William B. (2013). The Languages of the Kimberley, Western Australia. Routledge. ISBN 978-1-134-39602-3.
- Petri, Helmut (October 1939). "Mythische Heroen und Urzeitlegende im nördlichen Dampierland, Nordwest-Australien". Paideuma: Mitteilungen zur Kulturkunde. 1 (5). Frobenius: 217–240. JSTOR 40341058.
- "Tindale Tribal Boundaries" (PDF). Department of Aboriginal Affairs, Western Australia. September 2016. Archived from the original (PDF) on 8 March 2016.
- Tindale, Norman Barnett (1974). "Djaui (WA)". Aboriginal Tribes of Australia: Their Terrain, Environmental Controls, Distribution, Limits, and Proper Names. Australian National University. ISBN 978-0-708-10741-6. Archived from the original on 20 March 2020.
- Worms, E. A. (December 1950). "Djamar, the Creator. A Myth of the Bād (West Kimberley, Australia)". Anthropos. 45 (4/6): 641–658. JSTOR 40449333.
