= Bardi language =

Endangered Australian Aboriginal language

Bardi
- Region: Australia
- Ethnicity: 2000 Bardi, Jawi
- Native speakers: 380 (2021)
- Language family: Nyulnyulan: Western; Bardi
- Dialects: Jawi; Baard

Language codes
- ISO 639-3: Either: bcj djw – Jawi
- Glottolog: bard1254
- AIATSIS: K15
- ELP: Bardi
- Bardi is classified as Severely Endangered by the UNESCO Atlas of the World's Languages in Danger.

Bardi (also Baardi, Baard) is an endangered Australian Aboriginal language in the Nyulnyulan family, mutually intelligible with Jawi and possibly other dialects. It is spoken by the Bardi people at the tip of the Dampier peninsula and neighbouring islands (north of Broome, in Northwestern Australia). There are few fluent speakers in the 21st century, but efforts are being made to teach the Bardi language and culture in at least one school.

== Background ==
Before European settlement at the end of the 19th century, the population size is estimated to have been ~1500 people, with essentially the entire community speaking Bardi. Since then, the ethnic population has increased in number (now contains about 2000 people), but is essentially monolingual in English today (with only the oldest few people still fluent in Bardi). Estimates vary as to how many fluent Bardi speakers remain, but as of 2012, many middle-aged people could still understand the language, and some of them could speak it to a limited degree.

The language and culture is being taught at Christ the King Catholic School in Djarindjin community by Bardi/Jabirr Jabirr man Vincent McKenzie, who grew up speaking Bardi.

== Classification ==
Bardi is a member of the Western branch of the Nyulnyulan language family.

According to R. M. W. Dixon (2002), Bardi was mutually intelligible with the following dialects: Jawi, Nyulnyul, Jabirr-Jabirr, Ngumbarl, and Nimanburru. Ethnologue (206) treats all but Ngumbarl as distinct languages, and this view is supported by those linguists who have worked on the languages, including Claire Bowern and William McGregor. It is also the view of Bardi speakers.

== Documentation ==
There is considerable documentation of the Bardi language, but most of it is unpublished. The earliest work on the language, though now lost, dates from the 1880s. The earliest surviving records are from the start of the 20th century.

Gerhardt Laves spent some time on Sunday Island in the late 1920s and recorded textual materials totalling over 1000 pages, and steady documentation has progressed since the late 1960s. In 2012, an extensive reference grammar was written by Claire Bowern and published by De Gruyter Mouton.

== Phonology ==
=== Consonants ===
Bardi contains 17 phonemes in its consonant inventory, across five places of articulation and five manners of articulation. There are no fricatives or voicing distinctions among Bardi consonants.

Consonant phonemes
	Bilabial	Alveolar	Retroflex	Lamino-Palatal	Velar
Plosive	p ⟨b⟩	t ⟨d⟩	ʈ ⟨rd⟩	c ⟨j⟩	k ⟨g⟩
Nasal	m	n	ɳ ⟨rn⟩	ɲ ⟨ny⟩	ŋ ⟨ng⟩
Lateral		l	ɭ ⟨rl⟩	ʎ ⟨ly⟩	
Trill		r ⟨rr⟩			
Glide			ɻ ⟨r⟩	j ⟨y⟩	w

The plosives are voiceless word-initially and -finally, and usually voiced elsewhere. Intervocalically, plosives are often weakly lenited to approximants. This is distinct from the morpho-phonological processes involving lenition that occur in the morphological system, such as in allomorphs of the locative case (-goon ~ -yoon ~ -oon).

=== Vowels ===
Vowel phonemes
	Front	Back
Close	i [i], ii [iː]	oo [u], [uː]
Mid		o [o]
Open	a [a], a [aː]	

Bardi has an unusual vowel inventory. It is a seven vowel system, with long and short peripheral (/i/, /a/, and /u/) vowels and /o/, which is short. Short vowels are used much more frequently than long vowels, excepting /o/, the least common vowel quality in Bardi.

As expected for languages with rather few vowel qualities, allophonic variation is extensive, though long vowels have a more stable realization. /a/ is probably the most variable vowel, ranging from [æ] to [ɒ], from entirely front to back. /aː/ is more consistently realised as [ɑː]. /i/, /u/, /uː/ are usually a more lower [ɪ] and [ʊ~o(ː)], with /iː/ being closer to the cardinal vowel. Finally, /o/ is most often realised as [ɔ].

While otherwise quite similar to that of languages in the more well-known Pama-Nyungan family, the orthography of Bardi is exceptional in its transcribing of both high-back vowels as 'oo' rather than 'u'. This convention is typical of other Kimberly languages, such as Gooniyandi and Miriwoong. While one might suspect that this orthographic depth could lead to communication difficulties, /uː/ is by far the least common vowel in the language and bears little functional load.

=== Syllable structure ===
Bardi's syllabic template is (C)V(L)(C).

Bardi does not allow consonant clusters in the onset, except in borrowed words. A cluster of two consonants is allowed in the coda. That said, "within a syllable coda, the only possibility is /l/, /ɻ/, or /r/ followed by a nasal which is homorganic with the following stop."

=== Stress ===
Stress is demarcative in Bardi.

Primary stress in Bardi is always assigned to the first syllable, and all Bardi words receive this stress. In fact, primary stress even falls on the initial syllable of borrowed words that placed the stress elsewhere in their language of origin.

Stress alone never distinguishes between minimal pairs in Bardi.

== Morphology ==
Bardi is highly affixal, containing both derivational and inflectional affixation.

There are four major word classes in Bardi: nominals, verb roots, preverbs, and particles. These classes are defined according to their abilities to combine with other words and to inflect. Regarding their positioning across these two (i.e., distributional and inflectional) measures, "[a]ll four of the primary word classes can be distinguished on distributional criteria and three of the four can be distinguished on inflectional criteria as well."

=== Nominal morphology ===
==== Nominal derivational morphology ====
Nouns can only take a single derivational suffix as Bardi does not allow for multiple derivation. Little of Bardi's derivational morphology is productive or involves a change in word class.

The most common derivational morpheme in Bardi is the suffix -iidi. This morpheme attaches to the end of a noun to denote a person who is heavily associated with that area or who has reached a level of expertise in it. For example, joornk means ‘speed,' while joornkiidi means a person who is an expert in speed (i.e., a super fast runner). Similarly, jawaliidi, the Bardi word for a storyteller, is derived when this suffix is attached to the noun jawal, meaning ‘story.’ Despite its frequency of use, -iidi is not productive and can only be applied to certain nouns (though there does not appear any systematicity governing which nouns do and do not permit its application).

In addition to -iidi, there are about 20 other nominal derivational morphemes in Bardi. Several are displayed in the table below.

Nominal derivational morphemes
Morpheme		Example
Suffix	Function	Example
-al	indefinite/adjectival	ool-al water-INDF 'watery stuff, icemelt'
-jin	group plural	nyoongoorl-jin {old person}-GROUP 'old people'
-(g)arda	privative	iil-arda dog-PRIV 'without dogs'
-ngarr(a)	on compass points	ardi-ngarra north-WARDS 'to the north'

==== Nominal case morphology ====
Nouns in Bardi also often inflect for case. Case marking is phrasal, as it always occurs on the initial element of the noun phrase. There is no additional way in which case is represented in the phrase (Bardi is unusual in this respect).

Core cases are those able to trigger agreement marking on the verb; thus, core case markers indicate argument relations within a clause. In Bardi there are three core cases: ergative, absolutive, and instrumental.

Nouns in Bardi are marked by the ergative case when they are the subject of a transitive verb. Ergative subjects do not need to be animate or personal; for example, gaara meaning 'the sea,' can receive the ergative case marker nim and thus become gaaranim.

Nouns in Bardi take the absolutive case when they appear as the subject of an intransitive verb or the object (direct or indirect) of a transitive verb. Nouns receiving the absolutive case are unmarked.

When the applicative construction promotes them to the object of the verb, instrumental nouns can receive case agreement on the verb, thus satisfying the primary condition of a core case. In these instances, the instrumental case marker (-nga or -na) denotes that the noun is the instrument or the means by which an action was carried out. Instruments are always inanimate; if animate, they would be given the ergative (or comitative) case instead.

Core cases
Case	Form
Ergative	-nim
Absolutive	-ø
Instrumental	-nga ~ -ng

Bardi also uses local case markers to indicate spatial relations involving location, motion, and direction. The suffixes used to denote these local cases are listed in the table below.

Locative cases
Case	Form
Locative	-goon ~ -oon ~ -on
Local Allative	-goondarr
Allative	-ngan
Ablative	-go ~ -o
Lative	-gony(i) ~ -ony(i)
Directional	-madan
Perlative	-jarr
Toponym Locative	-i

=== Verbal morphology ===
Verbal morphology in Bardi is "quasi-agglutinative," in that much of the morphology is able to be divided into segments. It is also entirely inflectional, with the exception of a single affix with derivational properties.

Structure of verbal predicate
(Preverb) Prefixes-ROOT-Suffixes=Clitics

Simple verbal predicates in Bardi consist of a verb inflected with prefixes indicating number and person. Suffixes and clitics are optional . Complex verbal predicates additionally feature an uninflected preverb before the root. A prefix indicating person is found in all inflecting verbs. Beyond containing this prefix, inflecting verbs can contain up to ten additional prefixes and suffixes which indicate "transitivity, tense, aspect, applicatives, and reflexive/reciprocal derivation."

Two examples of the inflectional affixation within simple verbal predicates can be seen below.

Example #1	Example #2
i-ng-gama 3-PST-laugh 's/he laughed'	i-ng-gama-na 3-PST-laugh-REM.PST 's/he laughed (a long time ago)'

=== Other morphological processes ===
Though Bardi is highly affixal, it also utilizes other morphological processes, including reduplication, infixation, and compounding.

gard<ard>i
enter<REDUP/ITR>
'to enter over and over again'

Verbal reduplication in Bardi is primarily used for iterative, distributive, or pluractional functions. Iterative reduplication of a verb marks that its action is repetitive (as seen below). Reduplicating a verb can also mark that the action is distributive, or done multiple times by multiple parties. Pluractionality, or multiple parties engaging in the same action, is also indicated by means of verbal reduplication.

Bardi employs the morphological process of compounding.

jamoo- gamarda- nim
mother's.father- mother's.mother- ERG
'grandparents'

Jamoo means 'mother's father' and gamarda means 'mother's mother.' The two are combined to make jamoogamardaanim, meaning 'grandparents.' This same process is seen at work in a majority of Bardi's kinship terms.

== Syntax ==
=== Word order ===
Bardi has free word order governed by information structure.

Consider the sentence "Inanggagaljin baawanim mayi aamba," which is ordered V-S-DO-IO:

Verb Subject {Direct object} {Indirect object}
I-na-ng-ga-gal-jin baawa-nim mayi aamba
3-TR-PST-bring-REC.PST=3MIN.IO child-ERG tucker man
'The child brought tucker (food) for the man.'

In addition to the above construction, all other permutations of this sentence are also possible:

- Baawanim inanggagaljin mayi aamba
- Baawanim inanggagaljin aamba mayi.
- Baawanim mayi inanggagaljin aamba.
- Aamba inanggagaljin mayi baawanim.
- Aamba mayi inanggagaljin baawanim.
- Aamba inanggagaljin baawanim mayi.
- Mayi inanggagaljin baawanim aamba.
- Mayi baawanim inanggagaljin aamba.
- Mayi inanggagaljin baawanim aamba.
- Mayi inanggagaljin aamba baawanim.
- Inanggagaljin aamba baawanim mayi.
- Inanggagaljin mayi baawanim aamba. (etc.)

==== Other ordering preferences ====
Though Bardi has free word order, some ordering preferences do exist. These preferences are based on principles of “pragmatics, grounding, and focus.”

Often constituents are located 1) clause-initially or 2) clause-finally based on their contextual relevance.

1. Focus constituents are usually clause-initial. These constituents include information bearing contrastive focus, as well as information that is novel.
2. Non-omitted topics—information that is old but reintroduced—are usually clause-final. In Bardi, topics that persist in discourse are usually omitted in the sentences following their initial introduction. However, if an old topic is overt it may be reintroduced into the sentence—in which case, it will usually be located in the final position of the clause.
