= Carmel Charles =

Author and last fluent speaker of the Nyulnyul language

Mary Carmel Charles
- Born: Mary Carmel Charles; 15 July 1912 Beagle Bay Mission, Kimberley, Western Australia
- Died: 1999 (aged 86–87)
- Occupation: Author, language custodian
- Years active: 1990s
- Notable works: Winin: Why the Emu Cannot Fly (1993)

Mary Carmel Charles (15 July 1912 – 1999) was an author and the last fluent speaker of the Nyulnyul language of Western Australia. She was born to the Nyulnyul tribe in the Kimberley region of Western Australia at the Beagle Bay Mission. She played an important part in the documentation of the language and the writing of a Nyulnyul grammar, despite the fact that she was deaf.

The text in Charles's book, Winin, is bilingual and at the back of the small book is a guide to pronunciation of Nyulnyul words and word lists translating to and from English.

The story is a traditional story written for children. It is set "In the dreamtime ...", when the emu flies higher than all the other birds, and lives in the Milky Way. The other birds who fly close to the ground are jealous. The brolga tell the emu that if its wings were made smaller it would be able to fly even higher, and because the emu wants to fly higher it lets the other birds trim its wings. With small wings, the emu can't fly at all and will always stay that way.

In the book Charles is quoted:

"I was born in Beagle Bay Mission. My mother Angela Mandora and father brought me up. I went to school at the Mission until I was fifteen. The nuns taught me. There's nobody else now who knows the language, only a few, one or two people but they don't know it well. I would like for children to learn Nyulnyul language. I remember when I was young, my parents told me olden day stories about the emu and a brolga. I began working with Bill McGregor on language years ago at Beagle Bay. This is just one of the stories and I am glad it is published at last. I'm proud the emu is in a book. I will be eighty-two on the 15th July"

— Mary Charles, Winin : Why the Emu Cannot Fly 1993

== Bibliography ==
- Winin : Why the Emu Cannot Fly Magabala Books, 1993 illustrated by Francine Ngardarb Riches, translated by Bill McGregor
