= Nyulnyul =

Nyulnyul or Nyul Nyul may refer to:

- Nyulnyul people, an Aboriginal Australian people of Western Australia
- Nyulnyul language, an extinct Australian Aboriginal dialect formerly spoken by the Nyulnyul people
