= Jabirr Jabirr =

Aboriginal Australian people of the Kimberley region, Western Australia

The Jabirr Jabirr are an Aboriginal Australian people of the Kimberley region of Western Australia.

Jabirr Jabirr, is also written as Jabirrjabirr and with other spellings such as DjaberrDjaberr, Djaberadjabera, Dyaberdyaber and Jabba Jabba. Their language is the Jabirr Jabirr language.

== Country ==
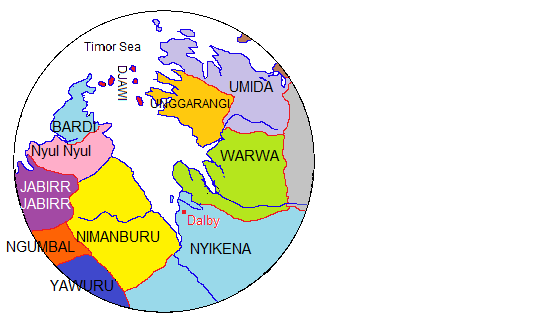
Traditional lands of Aboriginal tribes around Derby, WA

The Djaberadjabera held, according to Norman Tindale's estimation, some 800 square miles (2,100 km^{2}) of tribal land on the western side of the Dampier Peninsula. From the coastal area of Sandy Point at Beagle Bay, their territory went south as far as Cape Bertholet. Their inland extension was about 30 miles.

Running clockwise, their neighbours were, to the north, the Nyulnyul, the Warrwa on their eastern flank, the Nimanburu southeast, and the Ngombal to their south.

== History of contact ==
By 1953 only 5 members of the tribe were still known to survive, and in 1974 Tindale stated that they were virtually extinct.

== Alternative spellings ==
- Djaberadjaber, Djaberdjaber
- Dyaberdyaber
- DjaberrDjaberr
- Jabba Jabba
- Jabirrjabirr
- Tjabartjabara, Tjabirtjabira (Mangarla exonym)
- Tjabiratjabir

== Sources ==
- "AIATSIS map of Indigenous Australia". AIATSIS. 14 May 2024.
- Bischofs, P. Jos (1908). "Die Niol-Niol ein Eingeborenenstamm in Nordwest Australien". Anthropos. 3 (1): 32–40. JSTOR 40442523.
- Elkin, A. P. (March 1933a). "Totemism in North-Western Australia: (The Kimberley Division)". Oceania. 3 (3): 257–296. doi:10.1002/j.1834-4461.1933.tb00074.x. JSTOR 40327417.
- Elkin, A. P. (June 1933b). "Totemism in North-Western Australia". Oceania. 3 (4): 435–481. doi:10.1002/j.1834-4461.1933.tb01679.x. JSTOR 40327434.
- McKenzie, Vincent (13 August 2019). "Education is the key to keeping Bardi language and culture strong". Life. ABC.
- Petri, Helmut (October 1939). "Mythische Heroen und Urzeitlegende im nördlichen Dampierland, Nordwest-Australien". Paideuma. 1 (5): 217–240. JSTOR 40341058.
- "Tindale Tribal Boundaries" (PDF). Department of Aboriginal Affairs, Western Australia. September 2016. Archived from the original (PDF) on 8 March 2016.
- Tindale, Norman Barnett (1974). "Djaberadjabera (WA)". Aboriginal Tribes of Australia: Their Terrain, Environmental Controls, Distribution, Limits, and Proper Names. Australian National University Press. ISBN 978-0-708-10741-6. Archived from the original on 20 March 2020.
- Worms, Ernest A. (January–June 1950). "Feuer und Feuerzeuge in Sage und Brauch der Nordwest-Australier". Anthropos. 45 (1/3): 145–164. JSTOR 40450834.
- Worms, Ernest A. (May–August 1952). "Djamar and His Relation to Other Culture Heroes". Anthropos. 47 (3/4): 539–560. JSTOR 40449676.
