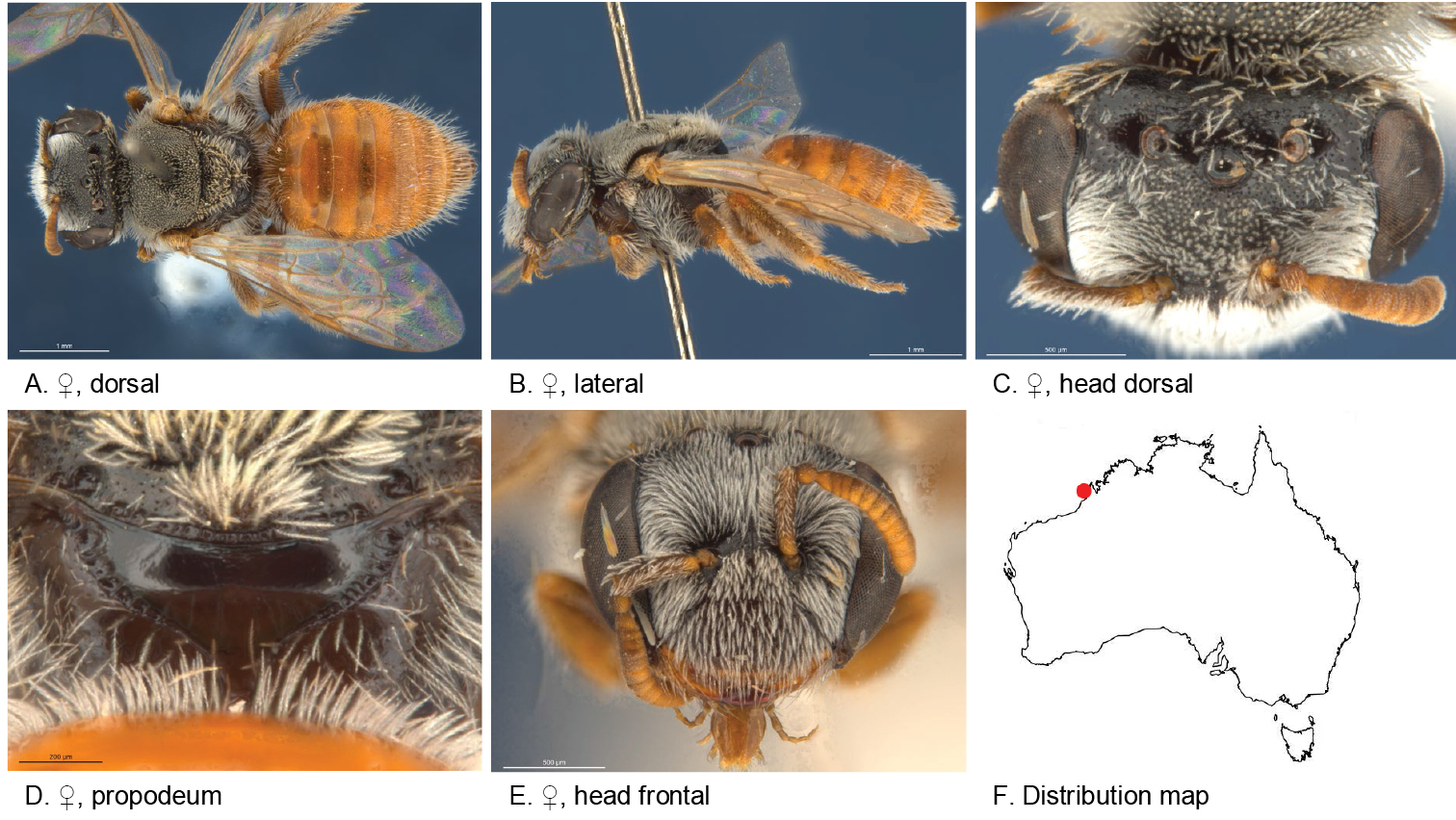
- Female holotype

Scientific classification
- Kingdom: Animalia
- Phylum: Arthropoda
- Clade: Pancrustacea
- Class: Insecta
- Order: Hymenoptera
- Family: Colletidae
- Genus: Leioproctus
- Species: L. albipilosus

Binomial name
- Leioproctus albipilosus Leijs 2018

= Leioproctus albipilosus =

Species of bee

Leioproctus albipilosus, or Leioproctus (Colletellus) albipilosus, is a species of bee in the family Colletidae and subfamily Colletinae. It is endemic to Australia. It was described by entomologist Remko Leijs in 2018.

== Etymology ==
The specific epithet albipilosus ("white-haired") is an anatomical reference to hair on the scutum.

== Description ==
The female holotype body length is 5 mm, head width 1.7 mm. Integumental colouration is mainly black, the metasoma orange. The hair is white.

== Distribution and habitat ==
The species occurs in north-west Western Australia. The type locality is 8 km south of Cape Bertholet on the south-west coast of the Dampier Peninsula.

== Behaviour ==
The adults are flying mellivores.
