= Cape Leveque Road =

Road in Western Australia

Coordinates: 17°28.405′S 122°29.116′E

Cape Leveque Road Western Australia
- Cape Leveque Road, Western Australia

General information
- Type: Rural road
- Length: 205 km (127 mi)
- Route number(s): State Route 151

Major junctions
- North end: Cape Leveque, Lombadina
- Waterbank Road; Beagle Bay Road; Pender Bay Road; Rumbul Bay Road; One Arm Point Road (State Route 151)
- South end: Broome Road, Broome

Location(s)
- Major settlements: Beagle Bay

The Cape Leveque Road is a regional Western Australian road that runs through pindan woodland for 205 kilometres (127 mi) between Broome and Cape Leveque on the Dampier Peninsula.

The southernmost 13.6 km (8.5 mi) section was narrow-sealed, the northernmost 101.4 km (63.0 mi) section (between south of Beagle Bay and its northern terminus) was sealed, and the middle 90 km (56 mi) section was unsealed. During the wet season, the unsealed section was often closed because flooding made it impassable.

The road is vital for servicing communities on the Dampier Peninsula and is also a popular tourist attraction. The road is maintained by the Shire of Broome.

== Upgrades ==
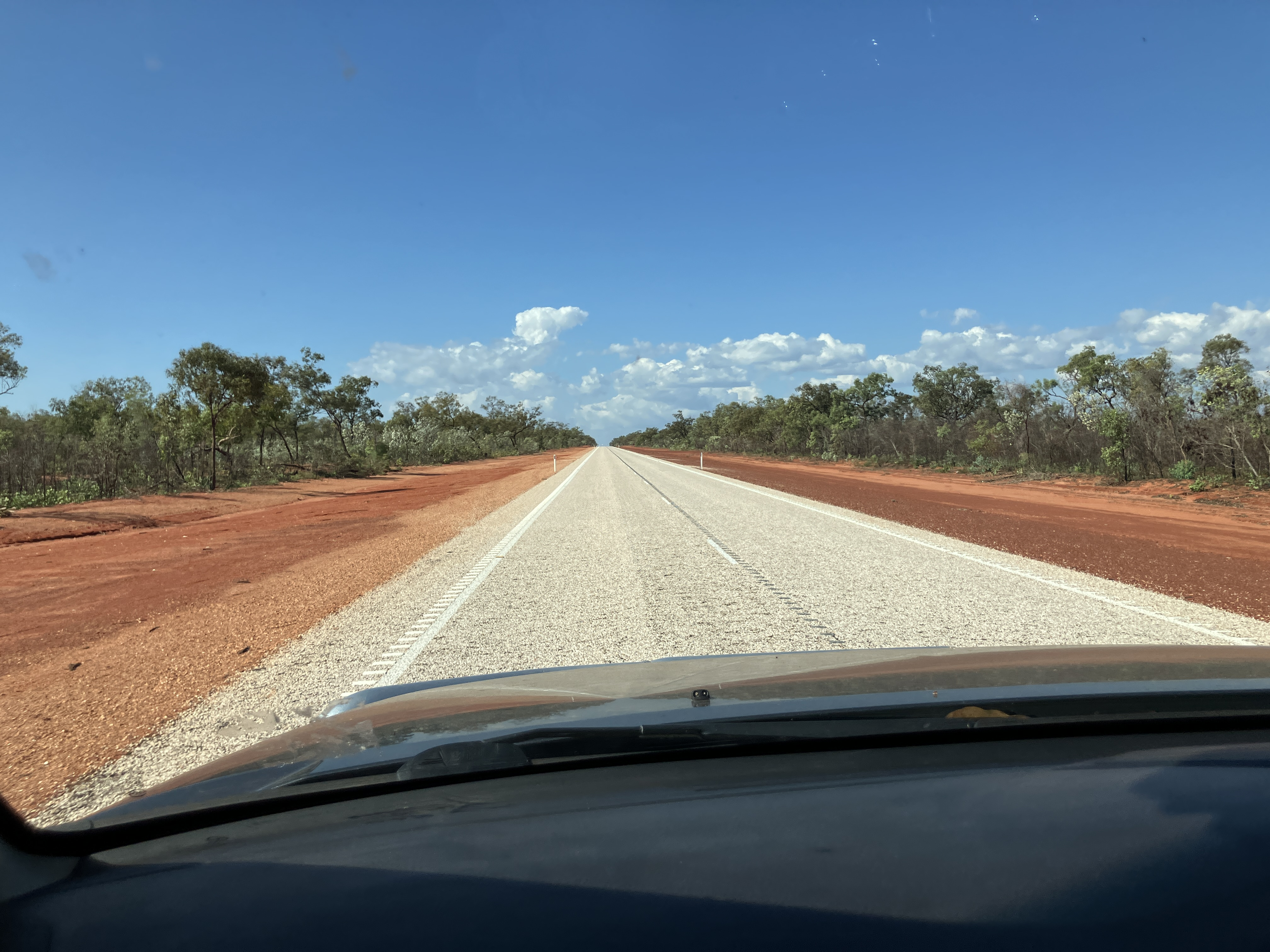
The road in the dry season in 2024, post-sealing

In May 2018, Main Roads Western Australia, an agency of the Government of Western Australia, started work to upgrade and seal Cape Leveque Road between Broome Highway and Beagle Bay. This work was funded under the Northern Australia Roads Program, with $65.7 million from the state and federal governments, and was completed in late 2020. It included both reconstruction and sealing of the southernmost section of narrow-seal and construction and sealing of the middle, previously unsealed, section.

== See also ==
- Highways in Australia
- List of highways in Western Australia
