= Nyulnyulan languages =

Endangered language family of Australia

Nyulnyulan
- Geographic distribution: along Fitzroy River, Dampier Peninsula in the Kimberley region
- Linguistic classification: One of the world's primary language families
- Subdivisions: Eastern; Western

Language codes
- Glottolog: nyul1248
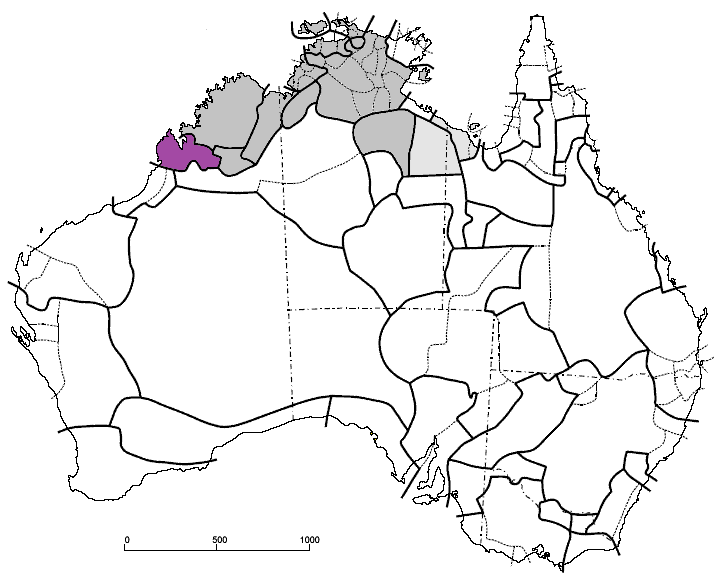
- Nyulnyulan languages (purple), among other non-Pama-Nyungan languages (grey)

The Nyulnyulan languages are a small family of closely related Australian Aboriginal languages spoken in northern Western Australia. Most languages in this family are extinct, with only three extant languages, all of which are almost extinct.

== Internal classification ==
The languages form two branches established on the basis of lexical and morphological innovation.

- Nyulnyulan
  - Western or Nyulnyulic:
    - Nyulnyul †
    - Bardi
    - Jawi †
    - Djabirr-Djabirr †
    - Nimanburru †
  - Eastern or Dyukun:
    - Yawuru
    - Dyugun †
    - Warrwa †
    - Nyigina
    - Ngumbarl †

== Vocabulary ==
Capell (1940) lists the following basic vocabulary items for the Nyulnyulan languages:

gloss	Bardi	Njulnjul	Jauor	Njigina	Warrwa
man	aːmba	waːmb	waːmba	waːmba	waːmba
woman	ɔranj	worinj	djando	djando	djando
head	nalm	nalm	maru	maru	ŋalma
eye	nem	nem	bani	nimelgar	nimelgar
nose	nimäl	nimäl	? nimäl	ŋunidjina	ŋunidjina
mouth	niler	niler	djawa	niler	niler
tongue	neaŋal	neaŋal	djälän	djälän	djälän
stomach	noŋ	noŋ	ŋalu	nuŋu	noŋ
bone	gɛndj	gɛndj	gändji	gändji	gändji
blood	welgar	welgar	gunbulu	gunbulu	gunbulu
kangaroo	buru	bardjani, burug	bardjanan	bardjani	bardjani
opossum	läŋgur	läŋgur	goiɛ	läŋgur	guɳɖuman
emu	inini	winin	ganaŋandja	ganaŋandja	ganaŋandja
crow	waŋgede	waŋged	djawari	waŋgaɳa	waŋgide
fly	mogonj	mogonj	bɛːrambin	waɳmin	waɳmin
sun	alg	waːlg	waːlga	baɽa	waːlga
moon	gunjul	gunjul	giliban	gilinman, giridin	giliman, giridin
fire	djuŋgu	djuŋgu	djuŋgu	djuŋgu	djuŋgu
smoke	gungud	gungud	ŋuɽun	duwi	duwi
water	wol, uŋgur	wol, wuŋgur	wula	wela	wela

== Lexical isoglosses ==
Some lexical isoglosses between Proto-Western Nyulnyulan and Proto-Eastern Nyulnyulan:

gloss	Proto-Western Nyulnyulan	Proto-Eastern Nyulnyulan
rotten	*biini	*mandu
leaf	*bilibil	*wirrkiny
bush country	*bindan	*birra
kangaroo	*burruk	*barrjaniny
tree, stick	*bardangk	*baalu
arrive, come	*darr	*-bula
yes	*iyi	*ngawayi
later, soon	*karrm	*wanyji
egg	*lakurr	*kambiy
good	*layib	*maabu
nose	*-mal	*nguni
seek	*-mi	*-murungu
knowledgeable	*-mungk	*nila
small	*murrul	*wuba
mud	*ngijil	*jabula ~ *jakula
sister	*marrir	*ngunu
forehead	*-nkarra	*jirrbal
thigh	*-nmurr	*balngany
tail	*-warla	*makarra
woman	*wurany	*jarndu

== Proto-languages ==
=== Proto-Nyulnyulan ===
Proto-Nyulnyulan
- Reconstruction of: Nyulnyulan languages

The following reconstruction of Proto-Nyulnyulan is from Stokes and McGregor (2003):

Abbreviations

- WNN: Western Nyulnyulan
- ENN: Eastern Nyulnyulan

no.	gloss	Proto-Nyulnyulan
1.	and	*a
2.	head	*-alma
3.	child	*baaba
4.	scorpion	*baarn
5.	deaf (ENN forget)	*bab
6.	brother (older) (B+)	*babala
7.	paperbark coolamon	*bakarl
8.	when	*bana
9.	feather (ENN bird)	*bandal
10.	carpet snake	*baninyburu
11.	smell	*-banyju
12.	poison for stunning fish	*banyjud
13.	east	*banu
14.	full up	*-bardika
15.	cover over, extinguish	**-barnd
16.	goanna	*barni
17.	exchange, reflexive/reciprocal IV	*-barnj
18.	think	*-barribarri
19.	wallaby	*barrjaniny
20.	cold season, winter	*barrkana
21.	turkey, bustard	*barrkar
22.	catfish	*barulu
23.	behind	*baybirr
24.	shade	*biika
25.	twinkle, twitch	*bilbil
26.	aggressive, wild, angry, fight	*bili
27.	soul, spirit	*bilyurr
28.	butterfly, moth	*bindabinda
29.	long pearlshell pendant	*binyjabinyja
30.	bark coolamon	*binyjin
31.	spring	*birlarr
32.	hit, kill	*-bu
33.	flower	*bubu
34.	nape of neck	*buda
35.	dream, dreamtime	*bukarri
36.	middle, in between, on the way	*bulngurru
37.	tired, exhausted	*bulyji
38.	bite	*-bundarr(a)
39.	shit, excrement	*burda
40.	dance	*burrb
41.	string	*burrurr
42.	camp, place, country	*buru
43.	blow	*buu
44.	ant species	*buya
45.	hammer	*da
46.	deaf	*dakidaki
47.	chin, lower jaw	*dangku
48.	turn	*dibirr
49.	kidney	*dilba
50.	fly	*dumbarra
51.	drink	*-(i)bi
52.	ask	*-jabala
53.	see	*-jala
54.	pelican	*jalinymarr
55.	fall	*-jalku
56.	magic power, healing potential	*jalngka
57.	doctor (medicine man)	*jalngkangurru
58.	cousin	*jalwal
59.	mother’s father (MF)	*jam
60.	axe	*jamiyunu
61.	wife’s father (WF)	*jamunyarri
62.	where	*jana
63.	tread, step, trample	*-janbu
64.	calf	*jangkala
65.	break	*-jangkulu
66.	split	*ja(r)l
67.	harmonic generation	*jarndu
68.	lift up, carry	*jarrbard
69.	tooth	*jarringk
70.	say, do	*-ji ~ *-di
71.	downwards	*jidlarra
72.	boomerang	*jiiba
73.	down, below, inside	*jimbin
74.	spear type	*jinal
75.	shooting star	*jirirr
76.	sing	*jirrmu
77.	corpse	*jiwarri
78.	tell	*-julnga
79.	fire	*jungku
80.	suck	*juny
81.	run	*jurnk
82.	downwards	*jurr
83.	snake	*jurru
84.	pour out	*jur(r)urr
85.	carry	*-ka
86.	bone	*kaanyji
87.	father’s mother	*kabali
88.	liver (ENN, except Jk guts)	*kabir
89.	ashes (cold)	*kajurd
90.	lose, drop	*-kalbarr
91.	up, above	*kalbu
92.	already, finished	*kaliya
93.	father’s father (FF)	*kalurd
94.	mother’s mother (MM)	*kamirda
95.	murderer, ritual killer	*kanarbin
96.	become fat/well nourished	*-kanb
97.	laugh	*-ka(n)ma
98.	spit, saliva	*kararr
99.	enter, go in	*-kard
100.	clapsticks	*karn-
101.	kangaroo species, large	*karrabulu
102.	shield	*karrbina
103.	call out	*kawu
104.	choke, strangle	*kiny
105.	this, he, she, it	*kinya
106.	brolga	*kudarrawany
107.	two	*kujarra
108.	west	*kularr
109.	frill-necked lizard	*kulamana
110.	sleep	*kulin
111.	yellow	*kumbarri
112.	blood	*kunbulu
113.	carry on shoulder, shoulder	*kundi
114.	brain, spinal marrow	*kunykuny
115.	saltwater turtle	*kurlibil
116.	dingo	*kurridi
117.	sky	*kurrwal
118.	blood	*kururr
119.	pearlshell	*kuwan
120.	ear	*-lababa
121.	climb	*lakal
122.	hear	*-lakarra
123.	dry	*lalka
124.	ear passage	*-lamarr
125.	throat, neck	*langan
126.	know, understand, recognise	*-langka
127.	possum	*langkurr
128.	steal, abduct	*lanyb
129.	fat, grease	*layda
130.	sour taste	*limba
131.	sour taste	*linyju
132.	saltwater crocodile	*linykurra
133.	mouth	*-lirr
134.	heart, emotion	*liyan
135.	blue-tongue lizard	*lungkura
136.	bum	*-lurru
137.	put	*-ma
138.	afternoon	*majal
139.	path, road	*makirr
140.	bag, coolamon	*malbulu
141.	nose	*-mal(ul)
142.	shadow, reflected image	*-mandarr
143.	bustard, scrub turkey	*mangkayarra
144.	throat	*-manya
145.	arm, hand	*-marla
146.	hungry	*marr-
147.	bum	*-marra
148.	shadow, reflection	*-marraj
149.	head	*marru
150.	vegetable food	*mayi
151.	armpit	*-mbarrma
152.	foot	*-mbala
153.	male of species	*mida
154.	shin, knee	*-midi
155.	lie, untruth	*miila
156.	be sitting down	*mijala
157.	arise, get up, wake up	*-milka
158.	stick implement	*milkin
159.	ankle, joint	*mil(y)ku
160.	grandparent/grandchild (diminutive)	*mimi
161.	eye	*-miny
162.	only	*minyjan
163.	club, nulla nulla	*nawurla
164.	devil, bad spirit	*ngaarri
165.	woomera	*ngabaliny
166.	spongy, hollow	*ngak
167.	cry	*-ngalka
168.	breast	*ngamarna
169.	language, speech, speak	*nganka
170.	interrogative particle	*nganyji
171.	leave	*-ngarl
172.	night?	*ngimbirr
173.	belly	*-ngu
174.	alone, by oneself	*ngudirr
175.	throw	*-ngula
176.	beard (WNN feelers of catfish)	*ngul(y)ku
177.	ashes	*ngurlun
178.	piss, urine	*ngurndu
179.	night	*ngurra
180.	be, sit	*-ni ~ *-nga
181.	sandhill	*niimar(r)
182.	flying fox	*nimanburru
183.	true, really	*ningarra
184.	tasty, sweet	*niyarra
185.	corroboree, song	*nulu
186.	hot, sweat	*nundurr
187.	alive	*nunyji
188.	fire, (hot) coals	*nurru
189.	get, catch, pick up	*-nya
190.	pierce, spear	*-ra
191.	parent-in-law (male) (WF?, HF)	*rambarr
192.	parent-in-law (female) (WM, HM)	*rangin
193.	pubic covering for initiated man	*riiji
194.	charcoal	*rirrka
195.	eat	*-rli
196.	exchange, return, in turn, barter	*rurrb
197.	anus	*-uru
198.	suddenly, unexpectedly	*waangka
199.	frog type	*walak
200.	sun	*walka
201.	man	*wamba
202.	coolamon type	*wandarl
203.	wind	*wangal
204.	young man	*wangalangu
205.	spider, spiders web, net	*wangkarra
206.	wattle type	*wangkaya
207.	crow	*wangkidi
208.	other	*warany
209.	one	*waranyjarri
210.	north	*wardiya
211.	meat	*warli
212.	rag, cloth	*wara
213.	rib	*wiirri
214.	emu	*winini
215.	louse	*wirnka
216.	taste, try	*-wirrik
217.	give	*-wu
218.	water	*wula
219.	joke, fun	*wungul
220.	crawl	*yadab
221.	husband (H, HB)	*yaku
222.	ahead, front, first	*yalirr
223.	standing	*yalku
224.	south (WNN south wind)	*yalmban
225.	lick	*yaly
226.	tongue	*-yangala
227.	who, what	*yangki
228.	woomera	*yarnkal
229.	no, not	*yarri
230.	father (F, FB)	*yibala
231.	sickness	*yiika
232.	dog	*yila
233.	disharmonic generation	*yinar
234.	wattle type (used for spears)	*yirrakulu
235.	tree type (boomerang)	*yirrkili
236.	descend, sink, go down	*yuwurr

=== Proto-Western Nyulnyulan ===
The following reconstruction of Proto-Western Nyulnyulan is from Stokes and McGregor (2003):

no.	gloss	Proto-Western Nyulnyulan
237.	bad, sick, trouble	*alik
238.	no, not	*arri
239.	open	*baab
240.	belt, girdle	*baali
241.	blind	*bamburr
242.	now, today, when	*banangkarr
243.	groin	*bandakar(r)
244.	praise	*-(ba)ngar
245.	finish	*-bany
246.	stick, tree	*bardangk
247.	skin, bark (of tree)	*bardun
248.	king brown snake	*barnkard
249.	tie	*-barrkand
250.	yesterday	*bayirdi
251.	rotten	*biini
252.	strong, firm, fearless	*biinmal
253.	leaf	*bilibil
254.	bush country	*bindan
255.	bad luck	*bindikal
256.	cold	*binyj
257.	long	*-birndi
258.	mother (M, MZ)	*birray
259.	blunt	*buna
260.	swell up	*-bungkum
261.	kangaroo (generic)	*burruk
262.	arrive, emerge, come	*darr
263.	true	*darrgal
264.	hard (not soft)	*diwa
265.	wipe	*duk
266.	three	*irrjuwarr
267.	yes	*iyi
268.	return	*jakurd
269.	fear	*-jarik
270.	go	*-jid
271.	touch	*-jiding
272.	die	*-jimb
273.	arms akimbo	*jimbijimb
274.	downwards	*jimbilad
275.	stand up, come to a stand	*jirrjirr
276.	wash	*-juluk
277.	back	*-ka
278.	wander about, roam	*-kal
279.	approach, come up to	*-kalak
280.	fire drill	*kalib
281.	scratch	*-kand
282.	vomit	*-kanyb
283.	yam type	*karangkam
284.	body	*-karda
285.	bird	*karrambal
286.	sharp	*karrji
287.	later, soon	*karrm
288.	scent, smell	*kiir
289.	appearance, shape, form	*-kinbal
290.	wet (of object)	*kubad
291.	father	*kubul
292.	squeeze	*kuly
293.	wedge	*kumb
294.	throat	*kurrbal
295.	feather	*laaban
296.	light (not heavy)	*labalab
297.	egg	*lakurr
298.	sit down	*-landa
299.	good	*layib
300.	black	*maanka
301.	far	*maara
302.	wife	*malirr
303.	many	*-mana
304.	leave	*-mankarda
305.	wave (hand)	*-many
306.	sister (Z)	*marrir
307.	goanna	*mayala
308.	search, look for	*-mi
309.	native rat	*mijaw
310.	sing	*-mil
311.	tired	*milamb
312.	choke (on something)	*-mingka
313.	warm, hot (of weather)	*mula
314.	head hair	*mukarn
315.	knowledge, knowledgeable	*-mungku
316.	root	*-mungkul
317.	honey	*mungu
318.	pour, spill out, flow	*-mur
319.	smell	*-murrar
320.	small	*murrulu
321.	soil, make dirty, become dirty	*-ngali
322.	defend, take sides with	*-ngaliny
323.	deny, refuse	*-nga(n)ny
324.	mud	*ngijil
325.	neck (exterior)	*-ngkan
326.	soft	*ngub
327.	dirty	*ngunyb
328.	knee	*ngurrungk
329.	forehead	*-nkarra
330.	thigh	*-nmurr
331.	old man	*nyungurl
332.	dry	*-ralk
333.	warm oneself	*-ramb
334.	heavy	*rambin
335.	suck	*rung
336.	cloud	*wadan
337.	tail	*-wala
338.	lie on back	*walirr
339.	eagle	*warrikana
340.	north	*wardi
341.	rain	*wungur
342.	woman	*wurany
343.	fingernail	*wurrul
344.	elbow	*yalangkun
345.	mother-in-law of man (WM)	*yalirr
346.	together	*yambun
347.	inquest sticks	*yandal
348.	near, close	*yangan
349.	pull	*yarr
350.	native mouse	*yubur(r)yubur(r)

=== Proto-Eastern Nyulnyulan ===
The following reconstruction of Proto-Eastern Nyulnyulan is from Stokes and McGregor (2003):

no.	gloss	Proto-Eastern Nyulnyulan
351.	tree, stick	*baalu
352.	hither, this way	*bakuna
353.	thigh	*balngan(y)-
354.	smell	*-banyju
355.	thirsty	*barra
356.	hit by throwing	*-barri
357.	kangaroo	*barrjanin
358.	catfish	*barulu
359.	red	*bilyi
360.	bush country	*birra
361.	turn off	*birrb
362.	arrive, come	*-bula
363.	white	*dub
364.	heart	*durlbu
365.	walk, walkabout	*inyja
366.	mud	*jabula ~ *jakula
367.	camp	*jalbi
368.	woman	*jarndu
369.	hip	*jarrbal
370.	forehead	*jirrbal
371.	that	*ka-
372.	eat	*kabu
373.	egg	*kambiy
374.	watch, stare at	*kanyjirr
375.	moon	*kirridiny
376.	body	*karrikin
377.	tie	*-kula
378.	vomit	*kurrbuk
379.	throw	*laj
380.	flesh, muscle	*-lany
381.	good	*maabu
382.	tail	*makarra
383.	rotten, stink	*mandu
384.	spear type	*mangul
385.	many	*manyja
386.	no, not	*marlu
387.	hand	*-marrangka
388.	search, look for	*-murungu
389.	blue-tongue lizard	*ngalyak
390.	yes	*ngawayi
391.	nose	*nguni-
392.	sister (Z)	*ngunu
393.	afternoon	*ngurrangurra
394.	smoke	*ngurun
395.	knowledge, knowledgeable	*nila
396.	eagle-hawk	*walakurru
397.	stone	*wanangarri
398.	cry	*wangkurr
399.	later, soon	*wanyji
400.	dig	*widij
401.	belt	*windirri
402.	big	*wirdu
403.	leaf	*wirrkiny
404.	small	*wuba
405.	rub	*wurr
