= Kukatja (Western Australia) =

Indigenous Australian people

The Kukatja people, also written Gugadja, are an Aboriginal Australian people of the Kimberley region of Western Australia.

== Country ==
The Kukatja's traditional lands were, according to Norman Tindale, (Note: Tindale's estimates particularly for the peoples of the Western desert are not considered to be accurate.) roughly 11,900 square miles (31,000 km^{2}), centering around Lake Gregory, and running east as far as Balgo. The northern frontier lay about Billiluna, and the waters at Ngaimangaima, a boundary marker between their northern neighbours the Dyaru, and the Ngardi to their east. They were present westerwards on the Canning Stock Route, from Koninara (Godfrey Tank) to Marawuru (Well 40). On their western borders were the Nangatara nation, with whom they had a hostile relationship.

=== Joint land claim ===
On 21 August 1980 a land claim was submitted by 90 claimants on behalf of the Warlpiri, Kukatja and Ngarti peoples, as traditional owners, under the Aboriginal Land Rights (Northern Territory) Act 1976, for an area of about 2,340 square kilometres (900 sq mi). It was the 11th traditional land claim presented on behalf of Aboriginal traditional owners by the Central Land Council. The land borders on areas in which each of the languages – Ngarti, Warlpiri, and Kukatja – is dominant. People from the different language groups have been influenced by each other when residing at Balgo, Western Australia and Lajamanu, Northern Territory. The claim was presented at Balgo Mission. The recommendation handed down by Justice Sir William Kearney on 23 August 1985 and presented on 19 August 1986 was that "the whole of the claim area be granted to a Land Trust for the benefit of Aboriginals entitled by tradition to its use or occupation, whether or not the traditional entitlement is qualified as to place, time, circumstance, purpose or permission".

== Language ==
The Kukatja people speak the Kukatja dialect of the Western Desert language.

As of 2019, scientists from the University of Queensland have been undertaking a research project on the Kukatja language in Balgo, the local lingua franca which is fluently spoken "by residents of all ages and across at least seven tribal groups". Researchers are recording conversations and mapping the language, believing that Kukatja could provide clues to how languages are spread around the world. Dr Luis Miguel Rojas Berscia believes that the mission, as in other places such as the Amazon and West Africa could be the common thread, bringing different ethnic groups together in isolated spots. Berscia, along with Balgo woman Melissa Sunfly and other residents, is working on developing a dictionary of the language and a teacher's guide, before English is taken up more widely by the younger generation.

== Ethnographic studies ==
Sylvie Poirier has written a monograph dedicated to the analysis of dreams (kapukurri) in Gugadja culture. Many Kukatja now live in the Mulan community.

== Alternative names ==
- Bedengo ("rock hole people", suggesting shiftlessness)
- Bidong, Bidungo
- Bunara, Boonara
- Gogada
- Gogadja, Gugudja
- Gogoda, Gugadja
- Ilbaridja
- Julbaritja (from julbari (south))
- Julbre
- Kokatja
- Kukuruba (of Ngalia people)
- Manggai (southern toponym, a watering place)
- Nambulatji
- Panara (grass seed harvesters)
- Pardoo (of western Kukatja groups)
- Peedona, Peedong, Pidung, Pidunga
- Wanaeka
- Wangatjunga, Wangatunga, Wangkatunga, Wangkadjungga, Wankutjunga
- Wangkatjunga (southern Kukatja groups)
- Wangu

Source: Tindale 1974, pp. 245–246

== See also ==
- Ngururrpa, a grouping of peoples of language groups including Kukatja

== Sources ==
- "AIATSIS map of Indigenous Australia". AIATSIS. 14 May 2024.
- McGregor, William B. (1999). "Kukatja Ethno-Physiology and Medicine: A Review Article". Anthropos. 4 (1/3): 224–228. JSTOR 40465706.
- Peile, Anthony Rex (1996). "Kukatja Botanical Terms and Concepts". In McGregor, William B. (ed.). Studies in Kimberley Languages in Honour of Howard Coate. München: Lincom Europa. pp. 71–115. ISBN 9783895860546.
- Peile, Anthony Rex (1997). Bindon, Peter (ed.). Body and Soul. An Aboriginal View. Hesperian Press. ISBN 978-0-859-05233-7.
- Poirier, Sylvie (2005). A World of Relationships: Itineraries, Dreams, and Events in the Australian Western Desert. University of Toronto Press. ISBN 978-0-802-08414-9.
- "Tindale Tribal Boundaries" (PDF). Department of Aboriginal Affairs, Western Australia. September 2016. Archived from the original (PDF) on 8 March 2016.
- Tindale, Norman Barnett (1974). "Kokatja (WA)". Aboriginal Tribes of Australia: Their Terrain, Environmental Controls, Distribution, Limits, and Proper Names. Australian National University. ISBN 978-0-708-10741-6. Archived from the original on 20 March 2020.
- Tonkinson, Robert (1989). "Local Organisation and Land Tenure in the Karlamilyi (Rudall River) Region" (PDF). In Western Desert Working Group (ed.). The significance of the Karlamilyi Region to the Martujarra people of the Western Desert. Perth: Department of Conservation and Land Management. pp. 99–259.
- Valiquette, Hilaire (1993). A Basic Kukatja to English Dictionary [Kukatja/English]. Luurnpa Catholic School. ISBN 978-0-646-12453-7.
- Worms, Ernest A. (January–June 1950). "Feuer und Feuerzeuge in Sage und Brauch der Nordwest-Australier". Anthropos. 45 (1/3): 145–164. JSTOR 40450834.
- Worms, Ernest A. (May–August 1952). "Djamar and His Relation to Other Culture Heroes". Anthropos. 47 (1/3): 539–560. JSTOR 40449676.
