= Sunday Island (King Sound) =

Island of Kimberley region of Western Australia

Iwanyi
- Location within Western Australia

Geography
- Coordinates: 16.40589854°S 123.1868559°E
- Area: 1,198 ha (2,960 acres)

Administration
- Australia

Demographics
- Population: 0

Sunday Island, also known as Iwanyi or Ewenu in the Djawi language, is an island off the coast in the Kimberley of Western Australia.

Sunday Island is a small island at the entrance to King Sound in the western Kimberley region of Western Australia. It is several kilometres east of Cape Leveque, at the southwestern end of the Buccaneer Archipelago. It is the traditional country of the Djaui people, most of whom now reside at communities on Cape Leveque. It is also home to the Sunday Island Mission.

The island occupies an area of 1,198 hectares (2,960 acres).

Priority flora found on the island include Alysicarpus suffruticosus and Eriachne semiciliata, priority fauna include the Eastern curlew, bushstone curlew, crested tern and bridal tern.
