= Jabirr Jabirr language =

Extinct Nyulnyulan language of Australia

Dyaberdyaber
- Dyaberdyaber
- Region: Australia
- Ethnicity: Djaberadjabera
- Extinct: 1980s
- Language family: Nyulnyulan: Western; Dyaberdyaber

Language codes
- ISO 639-3: dyb
- Glottolog: dyab1238
- AIATSIS: K8
- ELP: Jabirr-Jabirr

The Jabirr Jabirr language, also known as Djabirr-Djabirr, is a Western Nyulnyulan language formerly spoken by the Jabirr Jabirr people on the coast south of Beagle Bay in Western Australia. Earlier sources spelled the name DjaberrDjaberr or Dyaberdyaber; the contemporary accepted spelling is Jabirr-Jabirr, which reflects the spelling conventions of languages of the Kimberley region. It is also sometimes spelt Jabba Jabba.

The language is closely related to Nyulnyul and probably close enough to be mutually intelligible. The source materials from Nekes and Worms' (1953) "Australian Languages" list numerous similarities.

Jabirr Jabirr is as of 2020 part of a language revival project. Jabirr Jabirr is one of 20 languages prioritised as part of the Priority Languages Support Project, being undertaken by First Languages Australia and funded by the Department of Communications and the Arts. The project aims to "identify and document critically-endangered languages — those languages for which little or no documentation exists, where no recordings have previously been made, but where there are living speakers".
