= Djarindjin =

Community in Western Australia

- Interactive map of Djarindjin
- Coordinates: 16°30′54″S 122°53′42″E
- Country: Australia
- State: Western Australia
- LGA: Shire of Broome
- Location: 170 km (110 mi) N of Broome, Western Australia

Government
  - State electorate: Kimberley
  - Federal division: Durack

Population
  - Total: 206 (ILOC 2021)
- Time zone: UTC+8 (AWST)

Djarindjin is a medium-sized Aboriginal community located 170 km (110 mi) north of Broome in the Kimberley region of Western Australia, within the Shire of Broome. It is within the traditional lands of the Bardi and Jawi peoples.

== Location ==
Djarindjin is located on the west coast of the northern Dampier Peninsula sub-region, north of Broome. Djarindjin is part of a single urban area that incorporates the Lombadina Aboriginal community and the Lombadina Mission. At the 2016 Census, this single urban area had a total population of 397, including 312 Aboriginal and Torres Strait Islander people.

The township is approximately 2 km (1.2 mi) due west of Cape Leveque Road. Djarindjin Aboriginal Corporation maintains a very large land holding surrounding the town. This land includes existing and proposed development that services the northern Dampier Peninsula sub-region, including an airstrip, multi-function police station, and drinking water protection area, all of which are located at the Cape Leveque Road junction into Djarindjin.

== History ==
Djarindjin is within the traditional lands of the Bardi and Jawi people and belongs to the Goollargoon country. This was recognised by the Government of Australia when it was determined that the Bardi and Jawi people hold native title over the northern Dampier Peninsula.

The Lombadina Catholic mission of the German Pallottine Fathers existed from 1911, taking over a mixed Filipino-indigenous community. In 1981 it had two St. John of God Sisters teaching, five lay missionaries, and an administrator appointed by the Bishop of Broome.

== Native title ==
The community is located within the determination area of the Bardi and Jawi (WAD49/1998, WAD6001/2004) native title claim.

== Town planning ==
The Djarindjin Layout Plan No.3 was prepared in accordance with State Planning Policy 3.2 Aboriginal Settlements. Layout Plan No.3 was endorsed by the community on 31 May 2007 and by the Western Australian Planning Commission on 1 July 2008.

== Education ==
Children of school age at Djarindjin attend the Christ the King Catholic School (formerly Lombadina-Djarindjin Catholic Primary School). As of 2019 there were 88 students enrolled, from kindergarten to 17 years of age. The Bardi language and culture is being taught at the school by Bardi man Vincent McKenzie, who grew up speaking Bardi, along with development of strong literacy and numeracy skills, music, trade training certificates in hospitality and construction, various other subjects and a special education program.

== Governance ==
The community is managed through its incorporated body, Djarindjin Aboriginal Corporation, incorporated under the Aboriginal Councils and Associations Act 1976 on 10 September 1985.
