= Coolamon (vessel) =

Australian Aboriginal carrying vessel

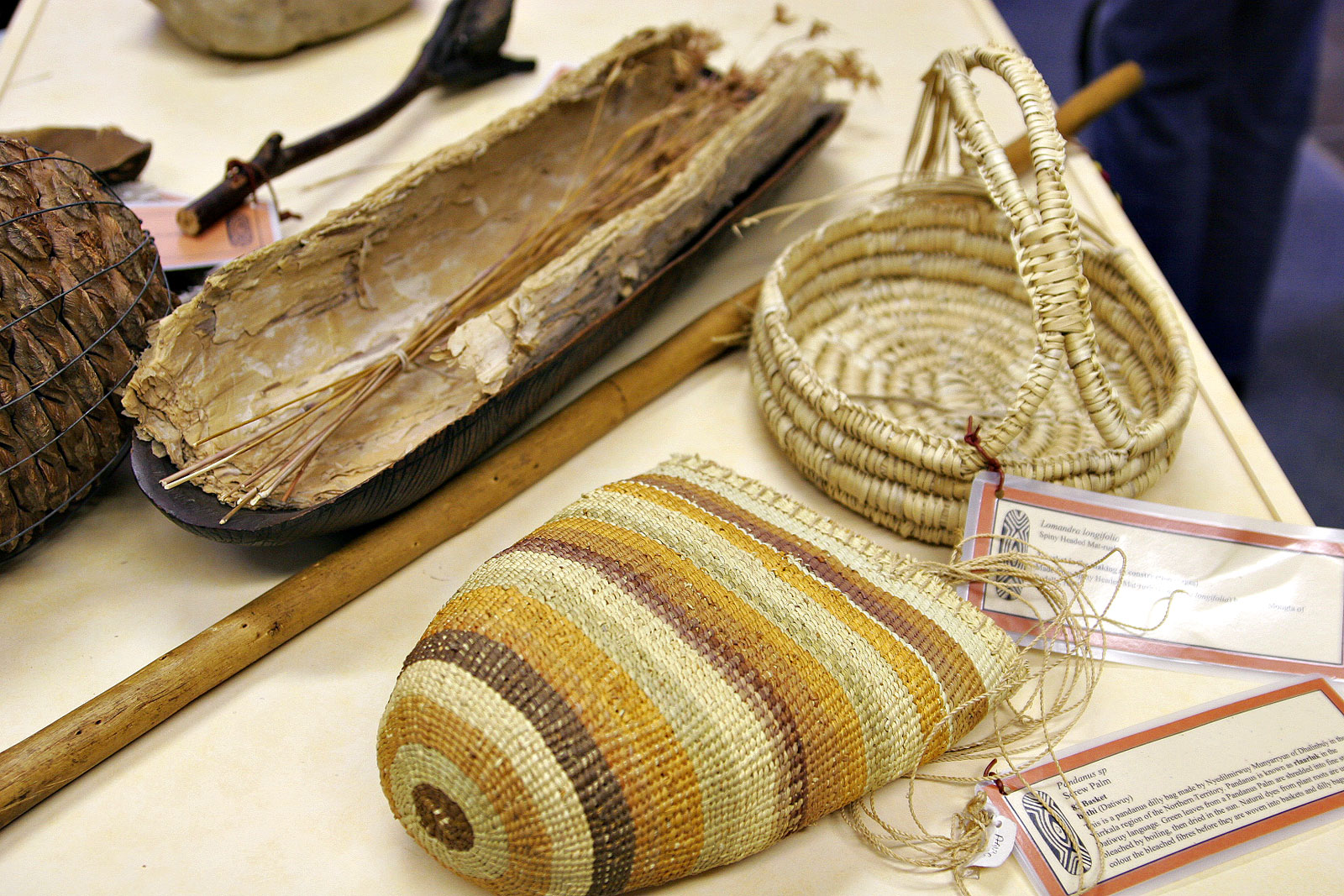
The coolamon in this picture is at top left. It is lined with paperbark, often done when used as a cradle for newborns.

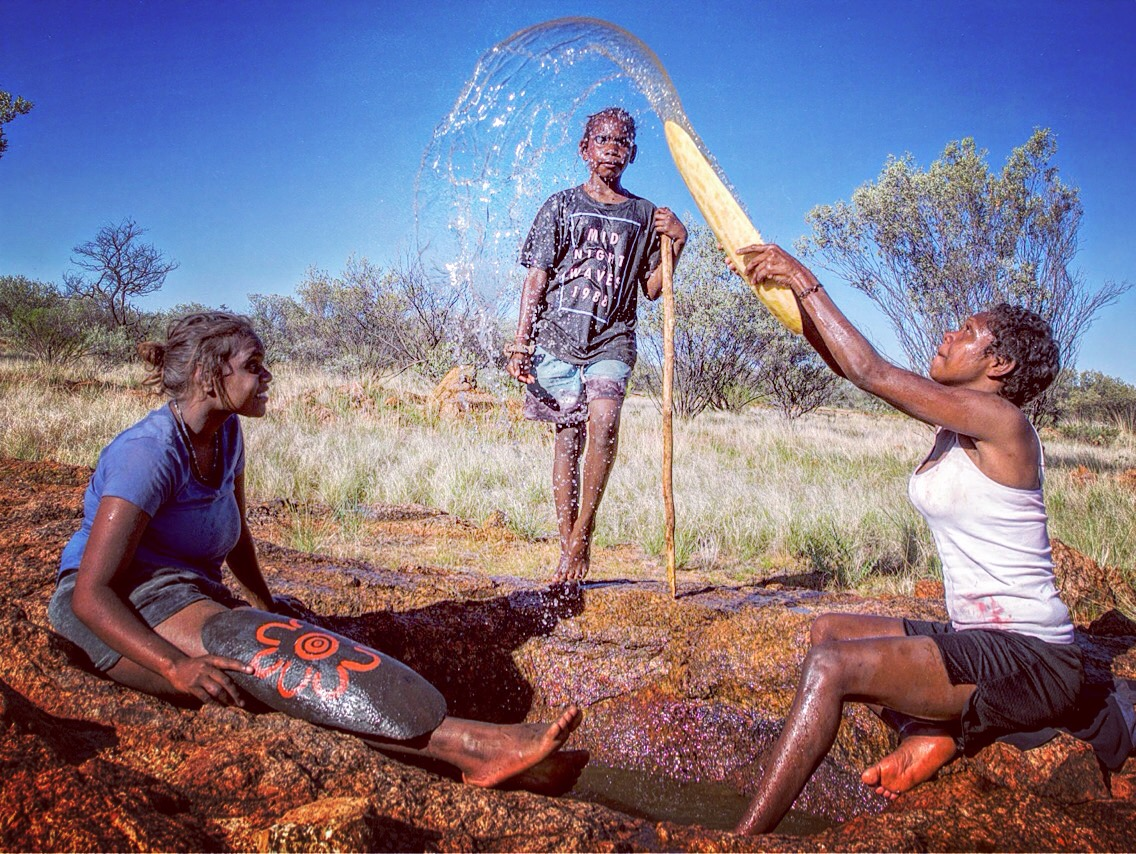
Women using coolamons

Coolamon is an anglicised version of the Wiradjuric word guliman used to describe an Australian Aboriginal carrying vessel.

It is a multi-purpose shallow vessel, or dish with curved sides, ranging in length from 30 to 70 cm (12 to 28 in), and similar in shape to a canoe.

Coolamons were traditionally used by Aboriginal women to carry water, fruit, nuts, as well as to cradle babies. Today when women gather bush tucker, they usually use a billy can, bucket or flour tin. Coolamons were carried on the head when travelling any distance, or under the arm if used as a cradle. If carried on the head, a ring pad (akartne in Arrernte) was placed on the head, made out of possum and/or human hair string, twisted grass, or feathers.

This helped to cushion and support the carriage of the coolamon; the same purpose as those used by women in traditional cultures around the world to carry vessels on their heads. The Pintupi of the Western Desert would attach a double strand of plaited rope (ngalyibi) made of hair or plant fibre to sling the coolamon over their shoulders. They also wore smaller coolamons as hats, with the twine around the chin.

Coolamons were used for winnowing grains in the traditional bread-making process, as well as a general heating and cooking vessel. They could even be used as an umbrella.

== Construction ==
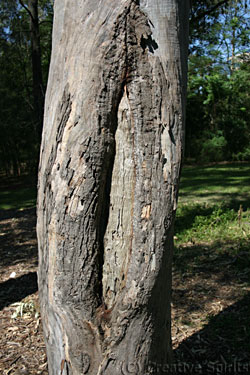
A scarred tree, probably used to make a coolamon (Parramatta, NSW)

Coolamons are generally made by the men. They are usually made from a hardwood such as mallee. In Central Australia, the bean tree was often used. A piece of the outer bark of the tree is removed, then moulded over the fire to give it its distinctive curved sides. Deep ridges were made using a quartz stone knife. It needed to stand for a number of days, with a stick of wood holding it open to prevent it losing its shape. It may also be made of a knot or excrescence (“wirree”), from a tree.

Coolamons were often ornately decorated on their exterior with various etchings – depicting tribal insignia and totemic designs. They were also used in ceremonies, such as for aromatic smoking, which was believed to have purifying effects. They were rubbed regularly with fat, such as emu fat to keep the wood in good condition.

Many other names are used in other parts of Aboriginal Australia, by Murri, Queensland Aboriginals, and people in the Northern Territory, Victoria, Western Australia as well as by the Dharug, or Eora people from the Sydney area. Some other names, and their respective languages, include:

Names
Word	language
piti	Pitjantjatjara; Martu Wangka
pitchi; bindgie; bingie	Ualarai
binguie	Wollaroi
dondee (small); kittee (big)	Kutthung
oorlarda	Bardi
tarnuk	
lijarri	Wagiman
urtne	Arrernte
yandandakko	Pintupi
yandi	Noongar
yoko	Kaurna
tjarndu	Murrinh-patha
gulaman	Wiradjuri

== See also ==
- Scarred trees
- Bush bread
- Australian Aboriginal artefacts
