= Nyulnyul people =

Australian Aboriginal people of the Dampier Peninsula in Western Australia

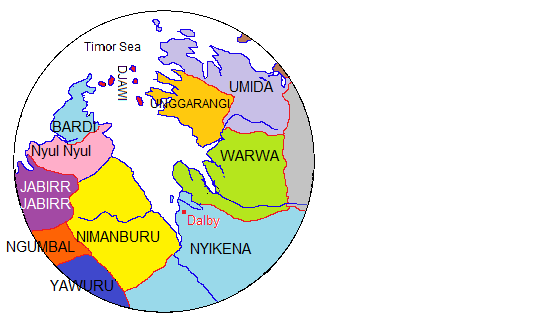
Traditional lands of Aboriginal tribes around Derby, WA

Location of Derby in Australia

The Nyulnyul, also spelt Nyul Nyul, Njolnjol, Nyolnyol and other variants, are an Aboriginal Australian people of the Kimberley region of Western Australia.

== Country ==
According to Norman Tindale, the Nyulnyul held sway over some 500 square miles (1,300 km^{2}) of tribal land. They were located on the western side of the Dampier Peninsula. Historically, the pressure of the Nimanburu led to them ceding ground on the King Sound, and by Tindale's time they were present from Cape Borda to Sandy Point, and at Carlyle Head and Goodenough Bay across the peninsula.

Running clockwise, their northern neighbours were the Bardi people, the Nimanburu lay on their southeastern flank, while the Djaberadjabera were directly south on the adjacent coast.

== Language ==
The Nyulnyul people spoke the Nyulnyul language.

== Social organisation ==
The Nyulnyul had a four section marriage and descent system.

== Alternative spellings ==
- Njolnjol
- Nyolnyol
- Nyul Nyul

== Sources ==
- "AIATSIS map of Indigenous Australia". AIATSIS. 14 May 2024.
- Bates, Daisy (1914). "Social Organization of some Western Australian Tribes". Australasian Association for the Advancement of Science: 387–400.
- Bischofs, P. Jos (1908). "Die Niol-Niol ein Eingeborenenstamm in Nordwest Australien". Anthropos. 3 (1): 32–40. JSTOR 40442523.
- Coate, H. H. J. (December 1966). "Rai and the third eye. North-west Australian beliefs". Oceania. 37 (2): 93–123. doi:10.1002/j.1834-4461.1966.tb01790.x. JSTOR 40329629.
- Elkin, A. P. (March 1933a). "Totemism in North-Western Australia: (The Kimberley Division)". Oceania. 3 (3): 257–296. doi:10.1002/j.1834-4461.1933.tb00074.x. JSTOR 40327417.
- Elkin, A. P. (June 1933b). "Totemism in North-Western Australia". Oceania. 3 (4): 435–481. doi:10.1002/j.1834-4461.1933.tb01679.x. JSTOR 40327434.
- Kaberry, Phyllis M. (June 1937). "Subsections in the East and South Kimberley Tribes of North-West Australia". Oceania. 7 (4): 436–458. doi:10.1002/j.1834-4461.1937.tb00397.x. JSTOR 40327647.
- Petri, Helmut (October 1939). "Mythische Heroen und Urzeitlegende im nördlichen Dampierland, Nordwest-Australien". Paideuma. 1 (5): 217–240. JSTOR 40341058.
- "Tindale Tribal Boundaries" (PDF). Department of Aboriginal Affairs, Western Australia. September 2016.
- Tindale, Norman Barnett (1974). "Njulnjul (WA)". Aboriginal Tribes of Australia: Their Terrain, Environmental Controls, Distribution, Limits, and Proper Names. Australian National University Press. ISBN 978-0-708-10741-6. Archived from the original on 20 March 2020.
- Worms, Ernest A. (May–August 1952). "Djamar and His Relation to Other Culture Heroes". Anthropos. 47 (3/4): 539–560. JSTOR 40449676.
