= Nyulnyul language =

Extinct Nyulnyulan language of Western Australia

Nyulnyul
- Region: Western Australia
- Ethnicity: Nyulnyul people
- Extinct: 1999, with the death of Carmel Charles
- Language family: Nyulnyulan: Western; Nyulnyul
- Writing system: Latin

Language codes
- ISO 639-3: nyv
- Glottolog: nyul1247
- AIATSIS: K13
- ELP: Nyulnyul

Nyulnyul is an extinct Australian Aboriginal language, formerly spoken by the Nyulnyul people of Western Australia.

Mary Carmel Charles is documented as the last fluent speaker of the Nyulnyul language of Western Australia.

== Phonology ==
=== Consonants ===
Nyulnyul has seventeen consonant phonemes, with five distinct places of articulation. Nyulnyul is a morphologically complex language with both prefixing and suffixing.

Consonant phonemes
	Bilabial	Apico-alveolar	Apico-post-alveolar	Lamino-palatal	Dorso-velar
Stops	b ⟨b⟩	d ⟨d⟩	ɖ ⟨rd⟩	c ⟨j⟩	g ⟨g⟩
Nasals	m ⟨m⟩	n ⟨n⟩	ɳ ⟨rn⟩	ɲ ⟨ny⟩	ŋ ⟨ng⟩
Laterals		l ⟨l⟩	ɭ ⟨rl⟩	ʎ ⟨ly⟩	
Taps		r ⟨rr⟩			
Glides	w ⟨w⟩		ɻ ⟨r⟩	j ⟨y⟩	

=== Vowels ===
Nyulnyul uses a three vowel system, with contrastive length for all vowels.

Vowel phonemes
	Front	Back
Close	i [i], ii [iː]	u [u], uu [uː]
Open	a [a], a [aː]	

== Classification ==
Nyulnyul is very closely related to and was possibly mutually intelligible with Bardi, Jawi, Jabirrjabirr and Nimanburru. These are all members of the Western Nyulnyulan subgroup of Nyulnyulan, a non-Pama-Nyungan family of northern Australia. It is possible that Ngumbarl also belongs to this group, although Bowern makes arguments from the Daisy Bates/Billingee records that Ngumbarl is an Eastern Nyulnyulan language. Speakers consider these all to be distinct.

== Grammar ==
Nyulnyul is a morphologically complex language with both prefixing and suffixing. The language has an ergative alignment system. Nouns do not have classes, but case on phrases is marked through bound postpositions. Verbs roots are inflected for person and number of its subject, tense, mood and voice through prefixes. A number of suffixes with different meanings can also optionally be used. Verbs are also used in compound verb constructions where a non-inflecting preverb is used together with an inflected verb. The language also has a number of adverbs and particles.

Clauses can also be constructed without the use of verbs when presentative, attributive or identifying. The word order is free.

== Literature ==
- Dixon, R. M. W. (2002). Australian Languages: Their Nature and Development. Cambridge: Cambridge University Press. pp. 666–667. ISBN 0-521-47378-0.
- McGregor, William B. (1994). "Complex Sentence Constructions in Nyulnyul, Western Australia". Functions of Language. 1: 25–66. doi:10.1075/fol.1.1.04mcg.
- McGregor, W. B. (1996). Nyulnyul. Munich and Newcastle: Lincom Europa.
- McGregor, W. B. (1999). "The Medio-active Construction in Nyulnyulan languages". Studies in Language. 23 (3): 531–567. doi:10.1075/sl.23.3.04mcg.
- McGregor, W. B. (1999). "External Possession Constructions in Nyulnyulan languages". In D.L. Payne; I. Barshi (eds.). External Possession. Amsterdam and Philadelphia, PA: John Benjamins. pp. 429–448.
- McGregor, W. B. (2000). "Reflexive and Reciprocal Constructions in Nyulnyulan languages". In Z. Frajzyngier; T.S. Curl (eds.). Reciprocals: Form and Function. Amsterdam: John Benjamins. pp. 85–122.
- McGregor, W. B. (2003). "Language Shift among the Nyulnyul of Dampier Land". Acta Linguistica Hafniensia. 35: 115–159. doi:10.1080/03740463.2003.10416076. S2CID 145001343.
- Nekes, H. (1938). "The Pronoun in Nyol-Nyol (Nyul-Nyul) and Related Dialects". In A.P. Elkin (ed.). Studies in Australian Linguistics. Sydney: University of Sydney. pp. 139–163.
