= Lombadina, Western Australia =

Community in Western Australia

Lombadina
- Lombadina is part of a single urban area that incorporates Djarindjin.
- Coordinates: 16°30′54.00″S 122°53′30.00″E
- Country: Australia
- State: Western Australia
- LGA: Shire of Broome
- Location: 170 km (110 mi) N of Broome, Western Australia

Government
  - State electorate: Kimberley
  - Federal division: Durack
- Time zone: UTC+8 (AWST)

Lombadina is an Aboriginal community on the north-west coast of Western Australia, situated on Cape Leveque, north of Broome in the Kimberley region. The name is derived from the Aboriginal word lollmardinard. The community is largely made up of Bardi people.

Lombadina is part of a single urban area that incorporates Djarindjin and Lombadina. At the 2016 Census, the single urban area had a population of 397, including 312 Aboriginal and Torres Strait Islander people.

In 1910–11, a Catholic mission was established at Lombadina with the help of Thomas Puertollano, a Filipino from Manila. In 1916, to prevent the mission being taken over by the Western Australian government because it was illegal at the time for an Asian person to employ Aboriginal people, the land was bought by the brother of the controversial Irish Redemptorist priest, John Creagh. Creagh was the rector of the Redemptorist monastery in North Perth.

== Native title ==
The community is located within the determined Bardi Jawi (WAD49/1998) native title claim area.

== Education ==
Children of school age at Lombadina attend the Lombadina-Djarindjin Catholic Primary School. The school runs classes for students from pre-school (4 years old) to Year 10 (16 years old). The total number of students is approximately 90.

== Governance ==
The community is managed through its incorporated body, the Lombadina Aboriginal Corporation, incorporated on 16 July 1987 under the Aboriginal Councils and Associations Act 1976.

== Town planning ==
Lombadina Layout Plan No.3 was prepared in accordance with State Planning Policy 3.2 Aboriginal Settlements. It was endorsed by the Western Australian Planning Commission in 2001 but was not endorsed by the community, and exists in draft format only.

== General references ==
- Deborah Ruiz Wall, "The Pigram Brothers: a top Aboriginal band talk about their Filipino heritage", Kasama 21(2), April 2007
- Regina Ganter, "Mixed Relations: Asian Aboriginal Contact in North Australia", University of Western Australia Press, ISBN 1-920694-41-2, 2006
