= HMS Cygnet =

Sixteen ships of the Royal Navy have borne the name HMS Cygnet, the name given to a young swan:

- HMS Cygnet (1585) was a 3-gun pink built in 1585 and condemned in 1603.
- HMS Cygnet (1643) was a 10-gun ship, originally a privateer. She was purchased in 1643 and sold in 1654.
- HMS Cygnet (1657) was an 8-gun sloop launched in 1657 and sold in 1664.
- HMS Cygnet (1684) was a survey vessel purchased in 1684. She foundered in 1687.
- HMS Cygnet (1688) was an 8-gun fireship purchased in 1688 and captured by the French in 1693.
- HMS Cygnet (1758) was an 18-gun sloop, formerly the French Guirlande. She was captured in 1758 and sold in 1768.
- HMS Cygnet (1776) was a 14-gun Swan-class ship sloop launched in 1776 and sold in 1802.
- HMS Cygnet (1804) was a 16-gun Merlin-class ship-sloop launched in 1804 and wrecked in 1815.
- HMS Cygnet (1819) was a 10-gun Cherokee-class brig-sloop launched in 1819 that became a Post Office Packet Service packet, sailing out of Falmouth, Cornwall. She was sold in 1835.
- HMS Cygnet (1840) was an 8-gun Alert-class brig-sloop launched in 1840, renamed WV30 when handed to HM Coastguard in 1863, and broken up by 1877.
- HMS Cygnet (1860) was a Philomel-class wooden screw gunvessel launched in 1860 and broken up in 1868.
- HMS Cygnet (1874) was a Forester-class composite screw gunboat launched in 1874 and broken up in 1889.
- HMS Cygnet (1898) was a D-class destroyer launched in 1898 and sold in 1920.
- HMS Cygnet (H83) was a C-class destroyer launched in 1931. She was transferred to the Royal Canadian Navy as the River-class destroyer HMCS St. Laurent in 1937 and was sold for scrapping in 1947.
- HMS Cygnet (U38) was a Black Swan-class sloop launched in 1942 and broken up in 1956.
- HMS Cygnet (P261) was a Bird-class patrol vessel launched in 1975 and sold in 1996.
