= Jawi dialect =

Nearly extinct dialect of the Bardi language of Western Australia

Jawi
- Djawi, Djaui
- Region: Western Australia
- Ethnicity: Jawi
- Extinct: by 2003
- Language family: Nyulnyulan: Nyulnyul; Bardi; Jawi
- Writing system: Latin

Language codes
- ISO 639-3: djw
- Glottolog: djaw1238
- AIATSIS: K16 Jawi (Malay)
- ELP: Jawi

Jawi or Djawi or Djaui, is a nearly extinct dialect of the Bardi language of Western Australia, the traditional language of the Jawi people. There are no longer any known fluent speakers, but there may be some partial speakers.

The name has also been spelt Chowie, Djaoi, Djau, Dyao, and Dyawi.

== Classification ==
Jawi is a Non-Pama–Nyungan language of the Nyulnyulan family, most closely related to Bardi. Bowern discusses how Jawi and Bardi may have converged within the last hundred years. Jawi people were hit hard by influenza in the early years of the 20th century. Their traditional lands are Sunday Island and the islands of the Buccaneer Archipelago to the northeast.
