= Beagle Bay Community, Western Australia =

Community in Western Australia

Beagle Bay Community
- Town
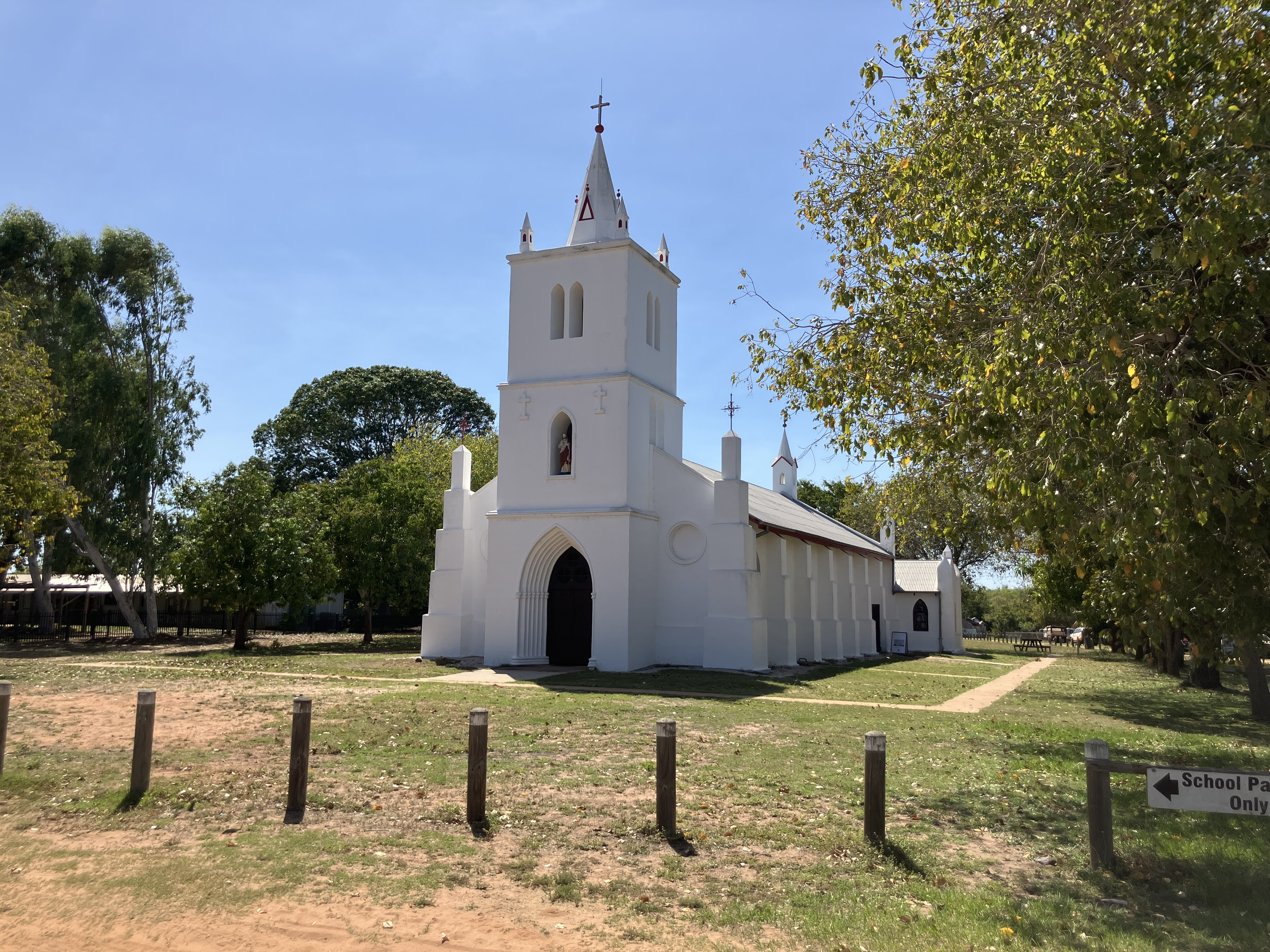
- Beagle Bay church

- Coordinates: 16°58′44″S 122°39′58″E
- Country: Australia
- State: Western Australia
- LGA: Shire of Broome
- Location: 115 km (71 mi) from Derby; 100 km (62 mi) from Broome

Government
  - State electorate: Kimberley
  - Federal division: Durack

Population
  - Total: 307 (UCL 2021)
- Time zone: UTC+8 (AWST)
- Postcode: 6725

Beagle Bay is a medium-sized Aboriginal community on the western side of the Dampier Peninsula, north of Broome in the Kimberley region of Western Australia. Beagle Bay was named in 1838 by John Clements Wickham, captain of HMS Beagle.

== Geography ==
The community is situated adjacent to the Indian Ocean. Beagle Bay is the gateway to communities further north such as Djarindjin, Lombadina, Bobieding and Ardyaloon. The main access road from Broome is unpaved and so becomes inaccessible during the wet season, although it remains connected to other towns on the peninsula to the north by a bitumenised road.

== History ==
The community was established by Trappist monks around 1890. Beagle Bay has a history of caring for stolen children. In 1884, the first priest arrived to serve the Catholics in the Kimberley, and to try to convert the Aboriginal people. Bishop Matthew Gibney founded the Beagle Bay mission, developed in the land of the Nyul Nyul people; this became a site for the Aboriginal people in 1890.

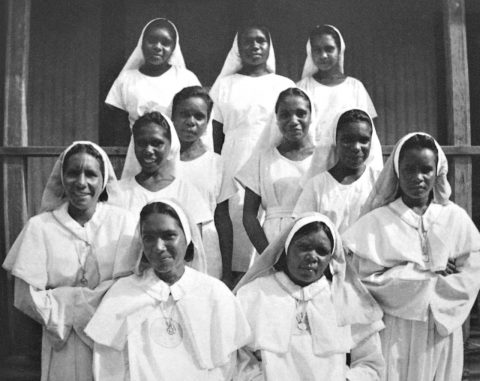
Aspirants, postulants and novices at Beagle Bay in 1947

The first Catholic school was established by the Trappist Fathers at Beagle Bay in 1892. In 1895, the Trappist monks of Sept-Fons in France extended their missionary work from Beagle Bay to Broome.

In 1901, Pallottine fathers from Germany took over the Beagle Bay Mission with two priests and four brothers. In 1907, the St John of God Sisters began to run a mission school at Beagle Bay and in 1918 the famous church was opened. It features a pearl shell altar which is now a tourist attraction. The Beagle Bay Mission subsequently became home to Indigenous people from across the Kimberley and further afield. Lawman and artist Butcher Joe Nangan lived and worked at the mission from around 1920 to the 1960s.

In her autobiography, Last Truck Out, Betty Lockyer recalls the Beagle Bay mission in the 1940s as a "Garden of Eden", in which;

the men had their jobs to do, each going to their own workplace, whether it was the bakery, gardens or checking the windmills. The women stayed at home to look after the babies and little ones ... There was no such thing as idle hands.

Author and ethnographer Daisy Bates began her life's work at Beagle Bay Mission in the early 1900s. (Note: Her accounts were among the first attempts at a serious study of Aboriginal Australian culture. Her Native Tribes of Western Australia is a detailed collection about Aboriginal people of Western Australia, and she did extensive work on Aboriginal languages. Her questionnaires, which were recorded on about 4,000 pages of typescripts, created a vast collection of over 23,000 pages of wordlists of Australian Aboriginal languages, which are now digitised.)

== Education ==
Beagle Bay Community has a school, Sacred Heart School, which caters for students from ages K-10. The school was established in 1892 by the Trappist monks.

== Facilities ==
=== Electricity supply ===
Electricity is generated and supplied locally by Horizon Power and comprises the Australian standard three phase 415/240 volts system 24 hours a day. There are frequent power surges and interruptions.

=== Water ===
There are two bores which pump into the ground tank. A transfer pump station then pumps the water into the high level tank.

=== Church ===
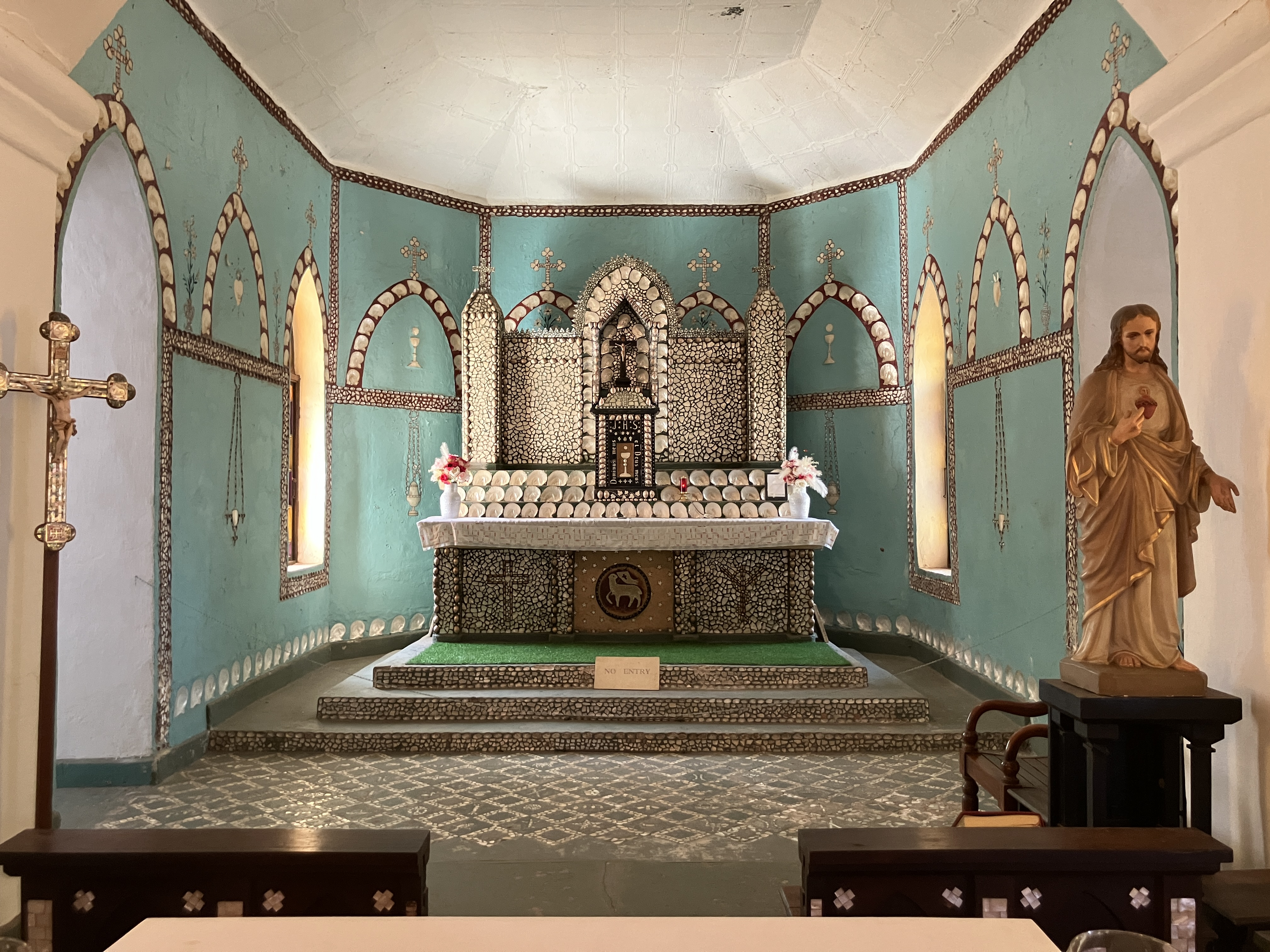
The altar of the Beagle Bay church

Beagle Bay's church was built by interned local Germans during World War I, and officially opened in 1917. It is famous for its interior decorated with mother of pearl, cowrie, volute and olive snail shells.

The church was a filming location for the 2009 musical Bran Nue Dae.

=== Cemetery ===
The community has a functioning cemetery. As per Aboriginal custom it is insensitive to mention the name of deceased persons. Shire of Broome health regulations stipulate that bodies must be buried at least 1.8 metres (6 ft) below ground level; however, this cannot be achieved at the Beagle Bay cemetery because the ground water level is too high.

=== Sewerage ===
There is a sewer system in place in the community which comprises three pump stations and treatment ponds on the eastern outskirts of the community.

=== Recreation ===
The community has basketball courts and an Australian rules football oval. Beagle Bay fields a team in the West Kimberley Football Association called the Beagle Bay (Peninsular) Bombers.

Bush walking, some fishing and camping are the dominant pursuits for tourists visiting. Visitors are required to apply for a permit prior to entering the community.

== Governance ==
The community is managed through its incorporated body, Beagle Bay Futures Indigenous Corporation, incorporated under the Aboriginal Councils and Associations Act 1976 on 17/04/2014.

== Town planning ==
Beagle Bay Layout Plan No. 1 has been prepared in accordance with State Planning Policy 3.2 (Aboriginal Settlements). Layout Plan No. 1 was endorsed by the community on 15 November 2012 and the Western Australian Planning Commission on 28 May 2013. The Layout Plan map-set and background report can be viewed at Planning Western Australia official site.
