= Cygnet (ship) =

Cygnet may refer to several ships :

- Cygnet (barque) with which George Strickland Kingston arrived in South Australia in 1836
- a privateer ship captained by Charles Swan (?–1690) and with which William Dampier explored the coastline of Western Australia in 1688 and 1699
- Cygnet 44, a yacht model by Caribbean Sailing Yachts
- SY Cygnet, a ship operating for Furness Railway
- HMS Cygnet, the name of sixteen ships of the Royal Navy
