= Syzygium suborbiculare =

Conservation status
- Data Deficient (IUCN 3.1)

Scientific classification
- Kingdom: Plantae
- Clade: Tracheophytes
- Clade: Angiosperms
- Clade: Eudicots
- Clade: Rosids
- Order: Myrtales
- Family: Myrtaceae
- Genus: Syzygium
- Species: S. suborbiculare

Binomial name
- Syzygium suborbiculare (Benth.) T.G.Hartley & L.M.Perry

Synonyms
- Careya jambosoides Lauterb.; Eugenia jambosoides (Lauterb.) O.Schwarz, nom. illeg. homonym. post.; Eugenia suborbicularis Benth.; Syzygium jambosoides (Lauterb.) Merr. & L.M.Perry

Species of tree

Syzygium suborbiculare, the red bush apple or lady apple, is a shrub or small understorey tree native to northern Australia (the Northern Territory, Queensland, and northern Western Australia) and New Guinea.

== Description ==
This tree or shrub typically grows to a height of 4 to 20 metres (13 to 66 ft). It blooms between June and November producing white flowers. The leaves are smooth, thick, leathery, broad oval 7.2–19 cm long. Flowers are white with numerous stamens. The edible fruit is flattened-globular, fleshy, prominently ribbed, 3–7 cm long, with a large seed.

== Habitat ==
It is found in open forests and woodland and on the flood plains and rocky sandstone hills of the Kimberley region of Western Australia where it grows in sandy soils.

== Uses ==
The fruit is eaten raw by Aboriginal people. The tree is also used as firewood and as a nectar source for bees.

The fruit has been regarded among the Aboriginal people as being particularly medicinally effective against respiratory problems. The juice extracted from the boiled or roasted fruit has been used to clear chest congestion or as a cough remedy; the fire-heated leaves were used to heal wounds; the pulp of a cooked fruit has been used to treat a sore ear; chewed fruit or seeds have been used as a remedy against toothache or mouth sores.
