= Cape Leveque =

Cape in Western Australia

Cape Leveque Lighthouse
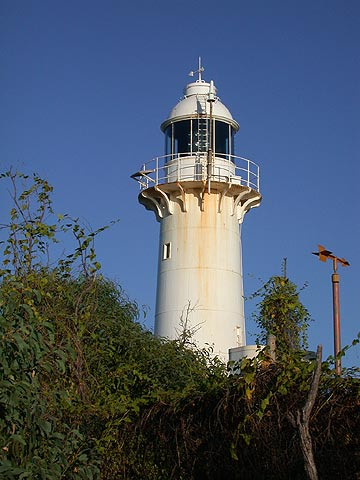
- Location: Cape Leveque at the northern edge of the Dampier Peninsula in Western Australia
- Coordinates: 16°23′41″S 122°55′41″E

Tower
- Constructed: 9 August 1911
- Construction: prefabricated cast iron
- Height: 13.3 m (44 ft)
- Shape: conical frustum tower with balcony and lantern
- Markings: White (tower), white (lantern)
- Operator: Kooljaman Aboriginal Community
- Heritage: State Registered Place

Light
- Focal height: 43 m (141 ft)
- Characteristic: Fl(3) W 20s

Cape Leveque or Cape Lévêque is at the northernmost tip of the Dampier Peninsula in the Kimberley region of Western Australia. Cape Leveque is 240 kilometres (150 mi) via the Cape Leveque Road north of Broome, and is remote with few facilities. Nevertheless, the Cape's sandy beaches are attracting an increasing number of visitors. It was named by Captain Nicolas Baudin after his hydrographer, Pierre Lévêque.

== Lighthouse ==
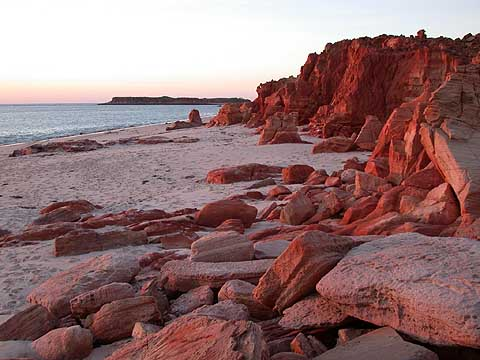
Cape Leveque (western side)

The 13.3-metre-tall (44 ft) lighthouse was commissioned at Cape Leveque on 9 August 1911. Its light characteristic is a group of three flashes that occurs every twenty seconds whereby the light source emits from a focal plane of 43 metres (141 ft). The lighthouse marks the western entrance of King Sound.

== History ==
Cape Leveque was a camping ground for ancient nomadic people of northern Australia and is probably still being used today. Their huge middens overshadow the small caravan park resting on the shores of the Indian Ocean. Wild turtles and a multitude of sea birds nest on the shores and collect seafood off the exposed rocks at low tide along the shore down the coast to Broome in the southern part of the peninsula. Humpback whales come to give birth in the area, and rest and play among the sheltered islands off the Dampier Peninsula.

The traditional owners of the area are the Bardi people.

William Dampier's description from Cygnet off Cape Leveque on 5 January 1688 reads:

This part is all a low, even land with sandy banks against the sea ... the points rocky and so are some of the islands in the bay... The soil is dry and sandy, destitute of water, except you make wells, yet producing divers sorts of trees.

In January 2015, the locality recorded rainfall in excess of 400 mm (16 in).

== See also ==
- List of lighthouses in Australia
