= Bobieding =

Community in Western Australia

- Interactive map of Bobieding
- Coordinates: 16°58′28″S 122°38′04″E
- Country: Australia
- State: Western Australia
- LGA: Shire of Broome
- Location: 120 km (75 mi) north of Broome, Western Australia

Government
  - State electorate: Kimberley
  - Federal division: Durack
- Time zone: UTC+8 (AWST)
- Postcode: 6725

Bobieding is a small Aboriginal community, located 120 kilometres (75 mi) north of Broome in the Kimberley region of Western Australia, within the Shire of Broome.

== History ==
The Bobieding Community is named after a local fresh spring water hole called Bobbies Spring. Bobieding consists of members of an extended family and was founded by Phillip Cox, community elder.

== Native title ==
The community is located within the registered area of the Bindunbur (WAD359/2013) native title.

== Governance ==
The community is managed through its incorporated body, Bobieding Aboriginal Corporation, incorporated under the Aboriginal Councils and Associations Act 1976 on 26 August 1988.

== Town planning ==
Bobieding Layout Plan No.1 has been prepared in accordance with State Planning Strategy 3.2 Aboriginal Settlements. Layout Plan No.1 was endorsed by the community on 1 August 2003, and by the Western Australian Planning Commission on 24 February 2004.

The Layout Plan map-set and background report can be viewed at Planning Western Australia's official site.
