= Dampier Peninsula =

Peninsula in Western Australia

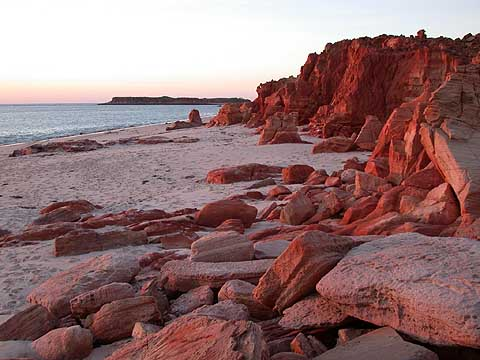

- Coordinates: 17°12′36″S 122°48′36″E
- Country: Australia
- State: Western Australia

Population
  - Total: 1,051 (SAL 2021)

The Dampier Peninsula is a peninsula located north of Broome and Roebuck Bay in the Kimberley region of Western Australia, named after the mariner and explorer William Dampier who visited it. It is surrounded by the Indian Ocean to the west and north, and King Sound to the east. The northernmost part of the peninsula is Cape Leveque. It is sparsely inhabited, mostly by Indigenous Australian peoples, some of whom have been granted native title rights to some of their traditional lands. There are many coastal inlets, bays, and other features, including Beagle Bay on its western side.

== Aboriginal heritage ==
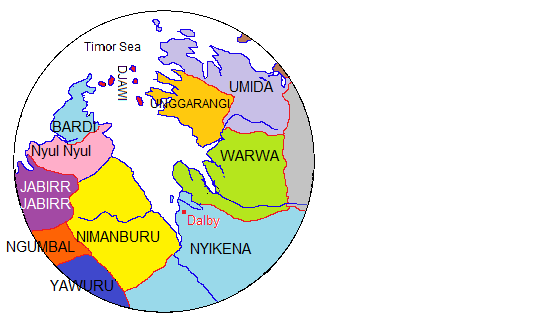
Map of the traditional lands of Australian Aboriginal tribes around the Dampier Peninsula.

The peninsula is home to a rich heritage of Aboriginal culture, with the communities of Beagle Bay, Bobieding, Djarindjin, Ardyaloon (One Arm Point), and Ngardalargin, along with numerous other smaller communities, pearling camps, tourist resorts, and Aboriginal outstations.

The traditional owners of the areas around the peninsula are the Bardi, Nyunyul, and Jabirr Jabirr (Djaberadjabera) peoples.

== Ecology ==
Many small trees, shrubs, and animals live on and in the sea surrounding the peninsula, the most characteristic vegetation being pindan woodland within the interior sandplains.

Mangroves are an important part within the peninsula, with 12 of Western Australia's 17 species present. Flying Fox colonies commonly roost in the trees during the day before foraging at dusk.

== Transport ==
The peninsula is traversed from south to north through Cape Leveque Road.

Numerous tour operators run bus services on the peninsula.

Air strips are situated at Cape Leveque, Bardi, Djarindjin (Lombadina), Beagle Bay, and some of the smaller communities and pearl farms.

== Tourism ==
There are several tourist accommodation facilities such as Cygnet Bay Pearl Farm (Cape Leveque), Kooljamon (Cape Leveque) and Middle Lagoon (Middle Lagoon).
