= Ernest Ailred Worms =

German missionary and linguist in Australia

Ernst Friedrich Gustav Worms (27 August 1891 – 13 August 1963), also known as Ernest Ailred Worms or Ernst Alfred Worms, was a German Catholic missionary and anthropologist who lived and worked among Aboriginal Australians in Western Australia. He became an expert in Aboriginal languages, and an important contributor to the development of both Australian studies of native languages, and to the ethnography of the continent's Indigenous peoples.

== Early life and education ==
Ernst Friedrich Gustav Worms was born on 27 August 1891 at Bochum, Germany, the son of railway worker Ernst Otto Worms (a Protestant) and Auguste Helene née Wieners (who was Catholic). He had two brothers, Adolf and Paul, and all attended a Catholic school in their home town. One of his sisters became a nun.

After gaining an accountancy qualification, 1912 he joined the Pallottines, a Roman Catholic order founded in 1835 by Saint Vincent Pallotti, when he was 20 years old. However, his studies were interrupted by conscription in 1914, and later wounds sustained on the Russian Front in World War I. at Brest-Litowsk. He was awarded the Iron Cross.

After recovering from his wounds, he studied languages under Hermann Nekes, who became a lifelong mentor and friend, later joining him in Australia. Nekes was professor at the Oriental Seminary in Berlin for six years and taught comparative religion and linguistics at the Pallottine college in Limburg an der Lahn. Worms studied there from 1918 to 1920, before being ordained as a Pallotine priest in 1920.

== Work ==
Before going to Australia, Worms was director of studies for the Pallotines in Rossel, East Prussia.

In 1930 he went to Australia, arriving in Broome, Western Australia, on 17 December, in the Minderoo from Singapore. He was immediately struck by the disparity in wages and treatment between European Australians and the Indigenous inhabitants, and said the government did not care. He spent his first period of missionary work there, which included serving as parish priest for eight years.

He started studying the cultures and languages of Indigenous Australians, starting with the Yawuru people in 1931.

In 1935 Worms' mentor, Hermann Nekes, joined him in Australia, and they travelled into the desert together to learn more about Aboriginal people and their culture, and he started focusing on their languages as well.

Around 1938, Worms assisted Bishop Otto Raible in the establishment of the Balgo Mission, near the border of WA and Northern Territory. Worms wished to set up a string of missions along the southern Kimberley region.

Later in 1938, Worms resumed teaching, moving south becoming rector of the Pallottine house in Kew, Melbourne, Victoria. While there, he continued his work with Nekes on the 26 languages of the Kimberleys, which was later published on microfilm. While in Victoria, he found a fully-formed, polished stone axe head near Myrtleford.

Returning to WA in 1949, his work as anthropologist gained him a good reputation, and he was invited to give lectures in capital cities around Australia as well as overseas, including the Smithsonian Institution in Washington, D.C.

In 1953‒54 and 1960, Worms, probably influenced by meeting German anthropologist Helmut Petri, went on field trips to investigate rock art in the Pilbara, funded by grants from the Wenner-Gren Foundation in New York. The Wenner-Gren Foundation also sponsored a 9-month expedition to the Alligator River region and central Australia.

He moved to Sydney as rector of the Pallottine house in Manly in 1957, but not long after that developed cancer. While in Manly, he also founded the NSW Anthropological Society, and he presented a paper on Aboriginal religion at the National Conference on Aboriginal Studies in May 1961. and a year later, he was appointed by the Menzies government to be a member of the linguistic panel of the interim committee of the Australian Institute of Aboriginal Studies (now AIATSIS) in Canberra.

In 1958, he wrote an article in a Sydney magazine which showed his understanding of problems facing Aboriginal peoples, and flaws in government policies towards them. He favoured integration over assimilation (then still popular with some governments) into European Australian society. Worms was careful about using Aboriginal terms to describe Christian values, pointing out for instance that the Gugadja people's concept of "spirit" was distinct from the Christian idea of "soul". He railed against those who judged Indigenous peoples by the extent to which they had adopted European ways.

== Death and legacy ==
Worms died of cancer in St Vincent's Hospital in Sydney on 13 August 1963.

Anthropology as a discipline was little known in Worms' lifetime, but his work was accepted by anthropologists in Germany and at the University of Adelaide. He had a vast knowledge of Aboriginal culture, and saw value in preserving it. He encouraged other Christians to learn about the cultures of those to whom they sought to bring the Gospel. He was however shy about lecturing students, instead arranging a series of lectures by a friend, Dr Adam, at Ormond College, University of Melbourne.

Worms' main focus was on the Dampier Peninsula languages, but he covered many others. He also wrote about fire myths and rock art.

During his life and for some time after his death, Nekes was held in greater esteem because he had been academically trained; however, since then, there has been a lot more appreciation for the work of Worms. R. M. W. Dixon criticised Worms' linguistic work, and A. P. Elkin saw him as an amateur (compared with Nekes), although he was not completely dismissive of his work.

Respected anthropologist W. E. H. Stanner later wrote that few Christian missionaries appreciated Aboriginal spirituality, but "I can think of no one whose insight and empathy could compare with, let alone exceed, that of the late Fr. Worms". Norman Tindale dedicated his major work (Aboriginal Tribes of Australia) to Worms, with these words "To the memory of Father Ernest A. Worms whose active encouragement, beginning in the year 1952, led to the preparation of this work in its present form".

Linguist William B. McGregor, who translated Nekes & Worms' magnum opus Australian Languages, has also written about their respective contributions to Australian Aboriginal linguistics. In a chapter in the 2017 work German Ethnography in Australia edited by Nicolas Peterson and Anna Kenny, McGregor provides a detailed overview of Worms' work. He also provides a list and map of the areas and languages that Worms covered in his fieldwork, which include locations in every state and territory except Tasmania. His concerns about language extinction and loss of traditional knowledge meant that he left a legacy that helped to preserve them. McGregor gives a detailed analysis of what he sees as the value of Worms' work; he concludes that in anthropology, the main value is "descriptive and documentary", but he feels that the contribution of both Worms and Nekes to Aboriginal linguistics is more significant than Worms' anthropological contributions.

== Stolen bones ==
In 1935 Worms came across the large body of an Aboriginal person wrapped for burial in bark and, as was a widespread custom, placed in the fork of a tree. He gathered the remains and dispatched them to Limburg. Worms was quite aware that he was violating the law against the unauthorised export of ethnological materials in doing so, and therefore requested anonymity. The remains, together with other skeletal material, was repatriated and restored to the Bardi Jawi, who laid them to rest in an offshore cave, in November 2015.

== Works ==
- Worms, Ernest (December 1942). "Sense of Smell of the Australian Aborigines. A Psychological and Linguistic Study of the Natives of the Kimberley Division". Oceania. 13 (2): 107–130. doi:10.1002/j.1834-4461.1942.tb00373.x. JSTOR 40327982.
- Worms, E. A. (January–June 1950). "Feuer und Feuerzeuge in Sage und Brauch der Nordwest-Australier". Anthropos. 45 (1/3): 145–164. JSTOR 40450834.
- Worms, E. A. (December 1950). "Djamar, the Creator. A Myth of the Bād (West Kimberley, Australia)". Anthropos. 45 (4/6): 641–658. JSTOR 40449333.
- Worms, E. A. (May–August 1952). "Djamar and His Relation to Other Culture Heroes". Anthropos. 47 (3/4): 539–560. JSTOR 40449676.
- Worms, E. A. (1957). "Australian Mythological Terms: Their Etymology and Dispersion". Anthropos. 52 (5/6): 732–768. JSTOR 40453110.
- Worms, E. A. (1959). "Verbannungslied eines australischen Wildbeuters. Ein Beitrag zur Lyrik der Bād". Anthropos. 54 (1/2): 154–168. JSTOR 40454331.
