= William B. McGregor =

Australian linguist

William Bernard McGregor is an Australian linguist. As of 2024, he is a professor in linguistics at Aarhus University in Denmark.

== Career ==
McGregor received his doctorate from the University of Sydney in 1984. Afterwards, McGregor had a number of positions through different institutions in Australia, before moving to Europe. He was appointed senior research fellow at KU Leuven in Belgium in 1998, and then visiting research fellow at the Max Planck Institute for Psycholinguistics in Nijmegen, Netherlands, for one and a half years. Since 2000, he has been a full professor at Aarhus University.

== Research ==
He specialises in the description of mainly non-Pama-Nyungan Australian languages, and does descriptive linguistic work on Gooniyandi, Nyulnyul and Warrwa languages. Since 2010, he has also studied Shua, a language spoken in Botswana. He works on theoretical and typological issues from within a variation of systemic functional linguistics he developed, called "semiotic grammar".

In addition to his own books, McGregor has published articles and book chapters about the work of other social scientists in Australia, notably the work of German linguists and ethnographers such as Pallottine missionary Ernest Worms and his mentor, Hermann Nekes.

== Recognition and honours ==
McGregor was elected a fellow of the Australian Academy of the Humanities in 1999, and became a member of Academia Europaea in 2014.

In 2010, Denmark honoured him with knighthood in the Order of the Dannebrog.

== Other activities ==
As of September 2024 he serves on the editorial boards of the Australian Journal of Linguistics and Language and History.

== Selected publications ==
- McGregor, William B. (1990). A Functional Grammar of Gooniyandi. Amsterdam: John Benjamins. ISBN 9789027230256.
- McGregor, William B. (1997). Semiotic grammar. Oxford: Clarendon Press. ISBN 0198236883.
- McGregor, William B. (2011). The Nyulnyul language of Dampier Land, Western Australia (PDF). Canberra: Pacific Linguistics, Australian National University. ISBN 9780858836471.
- McGregor, William B. (2015). Linguistics: An Introduction (2. ed.). London: Bloomsbury. ISBN 9780567483393.
- McGregor, William B. (2021). Neo-Firthian Approaches to Linguistic Typology. Sheffield, UK: Equinox Publishing. ISBN 9781781796665.
- McGregor, William B. (2026). A Grammar of Warrwa, Kimberley, Western Australia. De Gruyter. ISBN 9783111400006.
