= Helmut Petri =

German anthropologist

Helmut Petri (7 November 1907 – 21 June 1986) was a German anthropologist.

== Life ==
Petri was born in Cologne and received his early education both there and in Berlin. He began his university studies in 1928, taking in Economics, History and Philosophy, as well as coursework on Prehistory and Physical Anthropology, with studies that took him also to Rome, and Vienna where he studied under Wilhelm Schmidt. Wilhelm Koppers and Robert von Heine-Geldern were also among his teachers there. In this early phase Petri was particularly taken by Meso-American cultures, studying under the direction of Fritz Röck, and learnt Nahuatl. He completed his PhD with a thesis on currencies in the South Pacific (Geldformen der Südsee ).

His first professional appointment was in Vienna, where he was curator at both the Museum of Ethnology and the Museum of Natural History In 1935 he moved to Frankfurt am Main to take up a position with the Frobenius Institute. Frankfurt provided him with the opportunity to pursue research on Oceania and Australia at the Museum of World Cultures and, in 1938-1939, he embarked on his first piece of ethnographical fieldwork, which took him to the Kimberley region of Western Australia. There he worked in particular with the Worrorra, Ngarinjin (Note: Petri wrote Ungarinyin,. However Norman Tindale, after studying the problem with elders, settled on the ethnonym Ngarinjin.) and other tribes of the Dampier Archipelago.

On his return, Petri was drafted into the Wehrmacht and served as a radio-operator in France, Greece, North Africa and Italy. At war's end, he was taken prisoner and detained for several months in an American camp for POWs. On his release, he resumed his former job at the Frobenius Institute, under Adolf Ellegard Jensen, lecturing in anthropology. After a further stint of fieldwork in Australia in 1953-1954. he was appointed to a full professorship in 1956, and department chair of the Department of Social and Cultural Anthropology at the University of Cologne two years later. In 1959 he married a fellow ethnologist, Gisela Odermann, who had also accompanied him on his fieldwork expedition in 1953/1954. He retired in 1971.

Petri died in Cologne, after 6 weeks in an intensive care unit, after being hospitalized following a car accident in May 1986.

== Sources ==
- Beer, Bettina (2007). Frauen in der deutschsprachigen Ethnologie: ein Handbuch. Böhlau Verlag. ISBN 978-3-412-11206-6.
- Kokot, Vincenz (February 2012). "Short Portrait: Helmut Petri". German Anthropology. com.
- McCaul, Kim (2016). "The Australian Medicine Man (Der Australische Medizenmann) by Helmut Petri". Aboriginal History. 40.
- McGregor, William B. (23 November 2015). "Frs. Hermann Nekes and Ernest Worms's "Australian Languages"". Anthropos. 102 (1): 99–114. doi:10.5771/0257-9774-2007-1-99. JSTOR 40466792.
- Michel, Thomas (1988). "Helmut Petri 1907–1986". Paideuma: Mitteilungen zur Kulturkunde. 34. Frobenius Institute: V–XIII. JSTOR 23076465.
- Petri, Helmut (April 1956). "Dynamik im Stammesleben Nordwest-Australiens". Paideuma: Mitteilungen zur Kulturkunde. 6 (3). Frobenius Institute: III, V–XIII, 152–168. JSTOR 40341221.
- Tindale, Norman Barnett (1974). Aboriginal Tribes of Australia: Their Terrain, Environmental Controls, Distribution, Limits, and Proper Names. Australian National University.
