= Yoolya =

Aboriginal Australian evangelist (1899–1967)

Yoolya or Fulgentius Fraser (c.1899 – 4 July 1967) was an Aboriginal Australian (Nyigina) man who was born on his homelands on what was then known as Liveringa Station, near Derby, in Western Australia. He was a member of the Stolen Generations and, as a young child, was taken from his home to Drysdale River Mission where he was under the care of Catholic priests. He is remembered for saving the lives of the priests there when there was an attack in 1913.

He spent much of his life in Catholic missions until they were no longer able to support him and his family following the Great Depression and, after this time, he worked in the pastoral industry.

== Early life ==
Yoolya was the son of Wadadarl, also known as Brumby, a Nyigina woman and Percival (Percy) Rose who was the non-Indigenous manager of the station. It appears that Yoolya's father had little to no involvement in his son's life but was known to him. Rose, who was an honorary protector of Aborigines and Justice of the Peace, did pay the station's overseer Walter Fraser £500 to be his legal guardian and be named for him, as Yoolya's existence may have been seen as a threat to his position.

It is believed that Wadadarl died when Yoolya was a small child and he was raised primarily by her sister Stumpy.

== Time at the Drysdale River Mission ==
Yoolya grew up with his mother's people at the station until, in December 1909, he was forcibly removed from them, and thus became a member of the Stolen Generations. Once taken, he was transported 120 kilometres (75 mi) from his home to Derby and then on to the Drysdale River Mission, a Catholic mission, via the SS Koombana. He travelled there alongside twelve other Aboriginal boys from throughout the region and, on their trip they experienced seasickness and were transported alongside sheep and stores.

Yoolya was baptised into the Catholic faith soon after his arrival at the mission. He was also renamed Fulgentius after the Benedictine abbot Fulgentius Torres. At the mission Yoolya, who already spoke the Nykinia, Walmatjarri and Bunuba languages, learned to also speak English and Spanish. He used these language skills to help 'bring in' other Aboriginal people to the mission and, in reports by the Chief Protector of Aborigines (then Charles Frederick Gale) it was stated that he showed a decided willingness to help and that he was "active, intelligent … [and] much attached to the priests".

On 27 September 1913 some Kwini men, from the area surrounding the mission, attacked it and, although it is unclear why, it is likely because they had suspicion of people there and resented having them on their land uninvited. The two priests at the mission, Father DH Altimira and Father DE Alcade, were injured, but their lives were saved, after Yoolya, then 14 years old, distracted the attackers by firing a gun into the air.

Of the attack and Yoolya's rescue Father Flood stated: (Note: This quote has been changed to reduce the use of culturally offensive and/or derogatory terminology and sections changed are shown in square brackets. This original quote can be viewed through the reference link.)

Things had now assumed a desperate aspect indeed, and would undoubtedly have terminated fatally for all, were it not for the promptitude and intrepidity of [Yoolya], who ran for the gun, and fired a volley over the heads of the mad and furious murderers. This had a magic effect in routing the [attackers], who stampeded over the plains in wildest confusion and disorder. Thanks to that true and faithful boy!

— Father Flood, The W. A. Record, 25 July 1914

After this incident, the priests and the six lay pastors each carried guns.

== Time at Beagle Bay Mission ==
In 1918, when Yoolya was 19 years old, he was sent away to the Beagle Bay Mission in order to find a wife that would be considered 'suitable' to the government of the day. The then Chief Protector of Aborigines was A. O. Neville, who was a supporter of eugenics, who would only permit Yoolya (and people like him) to marry a woman with the 'same complexion' as him; or one with fairer skin. While there Yoolya worked as a baker and, on 5 August 1919, married Phillipena Melycan (also known as Sarah), who was also a Nyigina person (as well as likely having Afghan heritage). It is not clear whether the couple had a choice in this pairing and it was later suggested by descendants of people living there that they were matched by the authorities. After their wedding they wished to return to Drysdale River mission but their application was declined due to the lack of female missionaries there.

Yoolya and Phillipena would go on to have eight children with between 1920 and 1940 and their eldest daughter, Katie Rodriguez, later became a nun at Sisters of Our Lady Queen of the Apostles at Beagle Bay; this was the first and only order of Aboriginal nuns.

In 1923 the couple were briefly allowed to return to the Drysdale River Mission and, while there, Yoolya began working as an evangelist while Phillipena instructed local women. They returned to Beagle Bay again in 1924.

== Work in the pastoral industry ==
During the 1930s, suffering the impacts of the Great Depression, Yoolya was forced to find work outside of the mission and took work as a drover working for the Streeter & Male Ltd which was based in Broome. Many of the workers there called him 'Fred'. This work meant that he was away from his family for long periods of time and, during this period he fathered another child, outside of his marriage, when he was droving, in the region around Meekatharra.

In 1940 Yoolya finished working as a drover and took a new role as the sheep overseer at Myroodah Station and his family was able to join him there. This station was also significantly closer to Nyigina lands. Soon after he applied, and was granted, an exemption from the Aborigines Act 1905, in March 1941. This exemption meant that he could choose where to live and be entitled to wages and, in order for it to be granted he had to collect references from his employer and the missionaries at Beagle Bay.

In the early 1940s Yoolya moved again, this time to Nyigina lands, when he took the position of head stockman at Liveringa Station, where he had been born. The position was offered to him by Kim Rose, the nephew of his father. They lived together there at Willumbah, some distance from the main homestead, which served as an outstation; this site was very close to where Yoolya had been born and was a site of special significance to his people. In the Nykinia language Willumbah means 'home by the water'.

In this role he was able to teach the workers there his knowledge of his land, including the locations where musters could not happen for cultural reasons. He also continued to evangelise, this time to the Nyigina people, and taught them about his Catholic beliefs. It is particularly clear during this period that, despite his Catholicism, he remained knowledgeable of Aboriginal beliefs, customs, and ceremonial commitments.

Early in the 1960s Yoolya injured his arm while fencing and the subsequent gangrene infection meant that the arm was fully incapacitated. As he could no longer work at the station, he and his family moved into Derby.

== Later life ==
In Derby Yoolya continued to evangelise to people there and also worked as a cook at the nearby Aboriginal Reserve.

He died on 4 July 1967 while there and was buried at the Derby Pioneer cemetery.
