= Nyigina =

Aboriginal people of Western Australia

The Nyikina people (also spelt Nyigina and Nyikena, and listed as Njikena by Tindale) are an Aboriginal Australian people of the Kimberley region of Western Australia.

They come from the lower Fitzroy River (which they call mardoowarra).

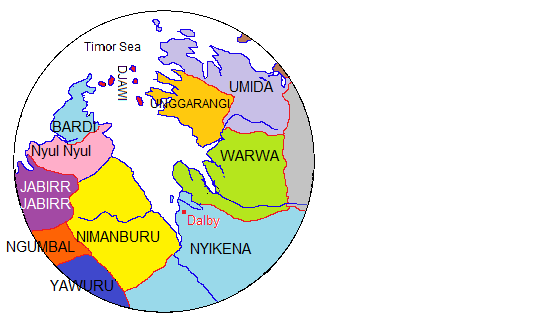
Traditional lands of Australian Aboriginal tribes around Derby, Western Australia (Note: This map is indicative only.)

== Language ==
The Nyigina language is one of several eastern varieties of the Nyulnyulan languages, closely related to Warrwa and Yawuru. As of 2012 it was spoken by around 10 people.

== Country ==
The Nyigina (Njikena) inhabited an area estimated at 11,300 square miles (29,000 km^{2}). The area is located on the lower Fitzroy River from Yeeda upstream to Noonkanbah, on both banks.

== Education ==
The Nyigina, together with the Mangala people, run the Nyikina Mangala Community School, a school at Jarlmadangah in West Kimberley. The Nyigina-Mangala peoples also run another school, together with the Walmajarri, at Looma.

== Native title ==
In 1998 the Nyigina people undertook legal proceedings to pursue their native title claims. One consisted of a Nyikina Mangala claim, which they shared with the Mangala while the other comprised the Nyikina- Warrwa pursued together with the closely related Warrwa people. The Shire of Derby settled an Indigenous land use agreement with the Indigenous plaintiffs, regarding the Nikina Mangala area, and set down a protocol that provided guarantees for surveying the Aboriginal cultural heritage before any development projects on the land could be undertaken. In 2014, after an 18-year legal battle, the Federal Court of Australia granted the Nyikina-Mangala petitioners native title over 26,000 square kilometres (10,000 sq mi) of territory, from King Sound through the Fitzroy Valley to the Great Sandy Desert.

== Prominent people ==
- Daisy Loongkoonan was a Nyigina elder and artist.
- Butcher Joe Nangan was a Nyigina Mabanjarra, songman, and artist.
- Katie Rodriguez a former Catholic novice and pastoral worker
- Paddy Roe was a Nyigina elder who wrote about Nyigina culture and religion.
- Yoolya, also known as Fulgentius Fraser, who was evangelist and stockman.

== Sources ==
- "After 18 years, Traditional Owners of the Fitzroy River get native title". Kimberley Land Council. 29 May 2014.
- "AIATSIS map of Indigenous Australia". AIATSIS. 14 May 2024.
- Bowern, Claire (2012). A Grammar of Bardi. Mouton Grammar Library. Vol. 57. Walter de Gruyter. ISBN 978-3-110-27818-7.
- McGregor, William (2006). "Prolegomenon to a Warrwa grammar of space". In Levinson, Stephen C.; Wilkins, David P. (eds.). Grammars of Space: Explorations in Cognitive Diversity. Language Culture and Cognition. Vol. 6. Cambridge University Press. pp. 115–155. ISBN 978-1-139-45839-9.
- "Nyikina Mangala and Shire of Derby-West Kimberley Native Title Process Agreement Map" (PDF). Geospatial Analysis & Mapping Branch, National Native Title Tribunal. 25 October 2014.
- "Tindale Tribal Boundaries" (PDF). Department of Aboriginal Affairs, Western Australia. September 2016.
- Tindale, Norman Barnett (1974). "Njikena". Aboriginal Tribes of Australia: Their Terrain, Environmental Controls, Distribution, Limits, and Proper Names. Australian National University. ISBN 978-0-708-10741-6. Archived from the original on 20 March 2020.
