= Katie Rodriguez =

Australian Catholic novice, cook and domestic (1920-1994)

Katie Rodriguez or Mary Catherine Rodriguez (24 November 1920 – 7 April 1994) was a Nyigina woman from Western Australia who became a Catholic novice and later was a cook, domestic and manager of pastoral stations including 'Debesa' which she ran alongside her husband Frank (Francisco) Rodriguez. Throughout her life she experienced significant racism as an Aboriginal Australian.

== Early life ==
Rodriguez was born at Beagle Bay Mission and she was the daughter of Yoolya (also known as Fulgentius Fraser) and Phillipena Melycan (also known as Sarah) who were living there. Both of her parents were Nyigina and both had been removed from their families at a young age (part of the Stolen Generations) and raised on Catholic missions. She was one of eight children the couple had together.

When Rodriguez was around 3 years old, in 1923, her father took the family to Drysdale River Mission where her father worked as an evangelist but returned to Beagle Bay the next year. At Beagle Bay she had to live in a dormitory, away from her family, from the age of six and was later also joined by many of her siblings. In the dormitories she was separate from her parents but was able to visit them regularly and, during some school holidays take camping trips with them; despite this she was not allowed to speak the Nyigina language and, although she was able to attend school, the primary purpose of this was to train her to be a domestic worker.

Rodriguez remembers her childhood as a happy one and she remembers waking up early to milk to cows and goats and help in the missions kitchen before starting school each day. At school she learnt songs that she would continue to sing throughout her life and spend many evenings sitting around large community campfires chanting the rosary.

== Time as a Catholic novice ==
Perhaps in rejection of this Rodriguez joined the Sisters of Our Lady Queen of the Apostles in January 1939 alongside her sister Edna. This was a newly created order of Aboriginal nuns that had been established at the mission and it was the first and only of its kind in Australia. Within the Daughters she became Sister Agnes and primarily worked as a domestic for them in supporting the 'white' nuns in delivering medical assistance although she did also, later, teach at the school (although in all roles she was required to be supervised by a 'white' sister. In 1943, when still a novice there, she applied for an exemption from the Native Administration Act 1936 (Western Australia), which limited her rights as an Aboriginal person, and in support of her claim said that she was supported and protected by the church (and Bishop Otto Raible). Despite this her claim was rejected.

Her life at the convent was restrictive and she was expected to practice perfect obedience, not to speak to anyone outside of the convent and to only receive visitors, including family, once a month. The rules of the Daughters also stated that the novice period would only last for two years but Rodriguez was a considered a novice for the seven years that she was there.

== Station work ==
In 1946 Rodriguez decided to leave the Daughters (Edna had left the year before) and joined her family at Liveringa Station, on Nyigina land, and where her father had been born; her precise reasons for leaving the convent are unknown. She arrived there on 27 July 1946 to work as a cook and there she met and later married Frank (Francisco) Rodriguez who was working there as a station hand/builder and had only arrived 10 days previously. Frank was from Spain and had previously been a novice at the New Norcia Mission who had left them in 1944. They married on 8 December 1946 and the speed of the marriage is likely due to the pressure on Rodriguez to return to the Daughters but despite this the pair were married by Bishop Riable and she received the 'blessing' of the church to do so. After the wedding, Frank was no longer allowed to enter the homestead of Liveringa due to his marriage to an Aboriginal woman. In their marriage, they remained committed to their shared Catholic faith. They would go on to have four children together.

In August 1947 they moved to Derby together but they faced administrative hurdles in trying to purchase a home together as neither were Australian citizens. As an Aboriginal woman Rodriguez could apply for citizenship under the Natives (Citizenship Rights) Act 1944–1951 (Western Australia) but in doing so would have to commit to adopting a 'civilised life' and not see her family, speak her native language or eat bush foods. Because of this Rodriguez had not initially applied when it was created but, in order to be able to purchase a home she did and her application was granted in September 1948; however she did not follow the rules of the act and called it a "ludicrous piece of paper". Frank also successfully received his Australian citizenship and they were able to purchase the land, however, by the end of 1948 the pair returned to Liveringa.

In 1952 the couple leased a pastoral property together, just 20 kilometres (12 mi) north of Liveringa, and they named it Debesa after the Galician word for 'a small field where animals come to feed'. It was significantly smaller than Liveringa so, while establishing it, they continued working at the larger station and take on other work were available. This included a period of time were they both worked for Kim (Kimberly) Durack, an agricultural scientist and part of the Durack family. In 1957, after partially building their home at Debesa, they were able to move there full time and run it as a sheep station. This was also possible as they sold a one third share to Horrie Miller. Unlike other pastoralists of the era they maintained close ties with the Aboriginal people living on the land.

In 1969, facing financial stress, the Rodriguez' were forced to hand over their lease to Miller and again returned to Derby where Rodriguez missed station life and, later on, remembered her years there as the best of her life. In 1974 they were able to travel together to Galicia in Spain where Frank had been born and meet with his family.

== Later life ==
On 25 May 1982 Rodriguez and Frank were involved in a car accident and Rodriguez in particular suffered serious injuries that resulted in the amputation of her right leg. She struggled to recover and suffered ongoing complications, including diabetes, and Frank acted as a carer to her.

She died on 7 April 1994 in Derby.
