= Cleverman =

Australian Aboriginal spiritual healers

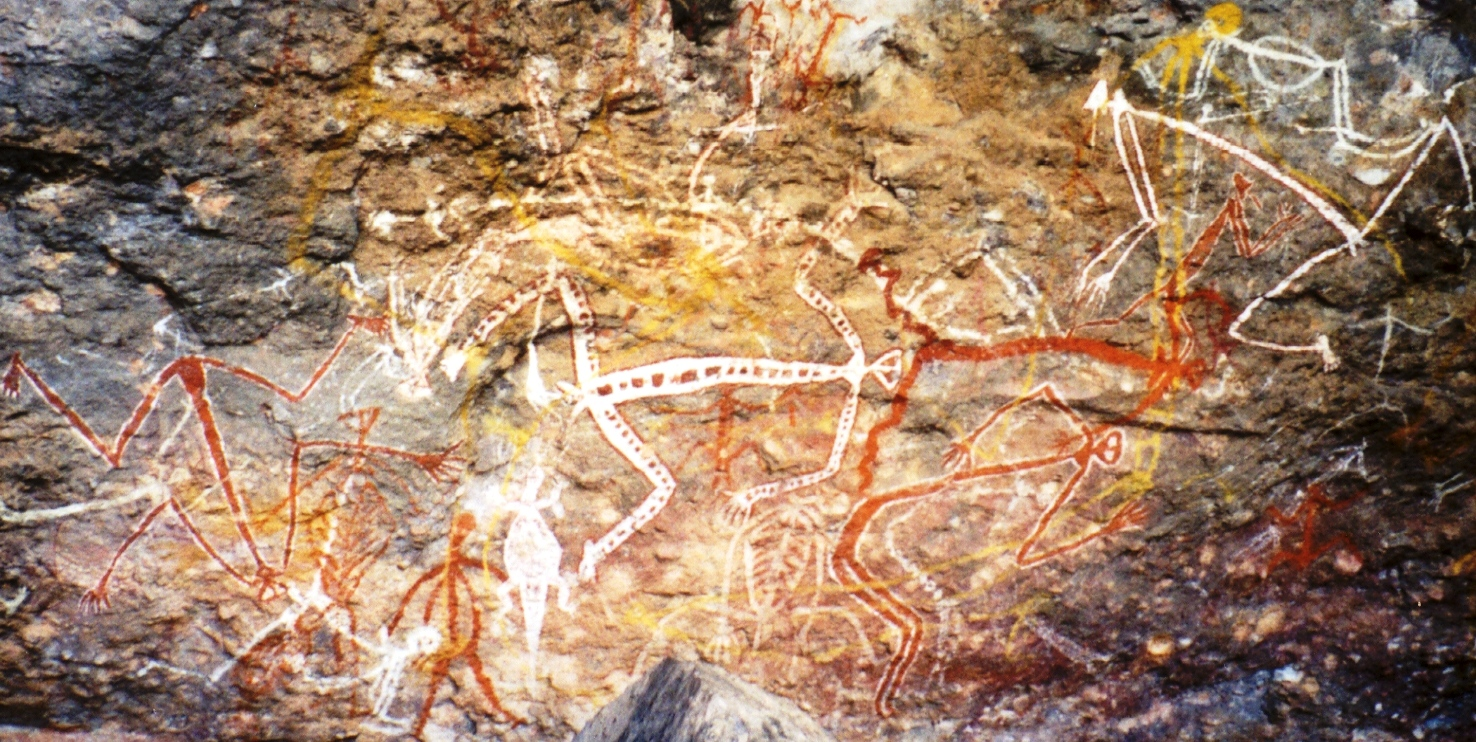
Rock painting of Mimih spirits, often associated with clevermen, in Kakadu National Park

A cleverman is a traditional healer and keeper of culture in many Aboriginal cultures of Australia. The roles, terms for, and abilities of a cleverman vary between different Aboriginal nations. Some clevermen heal bodily injuries and illnesses, while others heal spiritual ailments. They heal using plants, songs, and spiritual knowledge. Exceptionally powerful clevermen are believed to have magical powers and may heal both physical and spiritual ailments. Some sources also refer to clevermen having the ability to kill using magic, although this may be illegal within the culture or a separate form of harmful 'sorcery' from that used by cleverman healers. Clevermen also serve as cultural keepers and are experts in stories and spiritual beliefs. They have a strong understanding of sacred places and lore (which includes cultural heritage, laws, spiritual beliefs, behaviours, and rituals) and a deep connection to the Dreaming. Clevermen may be men or women, depending on the culture.

Older clevermen choose a younger community member to take their place as a cleverman, teach them the necessary skills over many years, and conduct initiation ceremonies which are often kept secret. Clevermen are deeply respected members of Aboriginal communities.

A cleverman's role bears some similarities to overseas traditional roles commonly referred to as shamans, witch-doctors, medicine men, and other practitioners of cultural-based healing and spirituality. For this reason, some sources also refer to clevermen by these names.

Upon European colonisation of Aboriginal lands the traditions of clevermen were suppressed, especially by Christian missionaries. However, the practices of clevermen continue into the present day.

== Reported abilities ==
Clevermen may perform surgery using physical and spiritual methods and some may have the ability to kill using magic. They may use magic substances such as quartz, kidney fat, or pearl to perform supernatural acts. Some clevermen use sacred tools, such as the human hair cords used by Wiradjuri clevermen to extract poison or to kill.

Some clevermen such as those of the Weilwan people have an intimate knowledge of Aboriginal astronomy.

Other clevermen communicate with spirits such as the Mimih, who long ago taught the marrkidjbu of the Bininj Kunwok people the ritualistic steps of carving up a kangaroo.

Some ceremonies, including those of the Wiradjuri, involve communication with spiritual beings, the granting of supernatural abilities, and absorbing magical objects into the body. One Wirdajuri apprenticeship ceremony involves summoning the god Baiami to walk amongst the initiates, Balamo then conducts supernatural events such as granting "X-ray' vision" and apparating and singing a naked flame into the chest of the initiate.

Some clevermen may have spiritual beings that reside within their body and help perform supernatural acts, such as the Wiradjuri's totemic beings or the Yolngu's 'soul-children'.

== In modern society ==
The healing practices of clevermen have seen particular interest from outside of their communities by researchers looking for more effective methods of treating Aboriginal peoples' mental and physical health. The practices themselves, and the emotional and social wellbeing that comes from the revitalisation of culture, may have health benefits to communities. For example, Ngangkari healers have seen broad acceptance for their abilities and frequently work with hospitals to heal Aboriginal patients. Traditional healing work in this can serve as one model for meeting Closing the Gap targets. However, ngangkari also recognise their abilities are limited against some ailments like drug addiction.

Some clevermen's ability to kill has been of continuing interest to outside scholars, who are unable to identify a cause of death. These practices have parallels in many cultures world-wide and their effects have been referred to as "voodoo death" or "nocebo" by scholars.

Traditions of traditional healing have led to challenges in engaging some Aboriginal patients with Western medicine. According to the Yolngu peoples' Madayin system of law, all acts of harmful sorcery or 'Galka Djama' are illegal. Some Yolngu people see legalised euthanasia as Galka Djama and reject it. Additionally, the language barrier in hospitals fosters greater fear, as there may be no Yolngu-speaking doctors of Western medicine in hospitals. As such, some Yolngu people may see the negative effects and procedures of large medical procedures as negative sorcery by white doctors. According to Anangu tradition, the body should not be "sliced open". This is related to traditional healing beliefs, and may cause Anangu people to reject the surgery of Western doctors.

== In different cultures ==
Different clans and language groups have their own names for a cleverman. Some of these include:

- Eora nation: carradhy.
- Yugambeh and Bundjalung nations: weeum, gundir, or wuyun gali, or wuyung, wiyung, wuyun.
- Galibal people: cooradgi.
- Wangkangurru people: minparu.
- Diyari people: kunki.
- Gamilaraay nation: wiringin.
- Dalabon peoples: marrngkidj.
- Bininj Kunwok: na-kordang, or marrkidjbu (marrugeku).
- Duuŋidjawu language: gundir.
- Pitjantjatjara people: ngangkari.
- Yolŋu languages: Marrnggitj (healers) and Galka (harmful sorcerers).
- Martu peoples: mabarn.
- Gunaikurnai people: mullamulliñ.
- Bidjawal people: mullamulliñ (sorcerer), badāra (cleverman).
- Gumbaynggirr and Yaygirr peoples: Ngaluunggirr.
- Wiradjuri or Ngiyampaa people (uncertain): wiri-ŋan, bugi-nja, ki-ki-wi-lan, walemira 'talmai.

== Notable clevermen ==
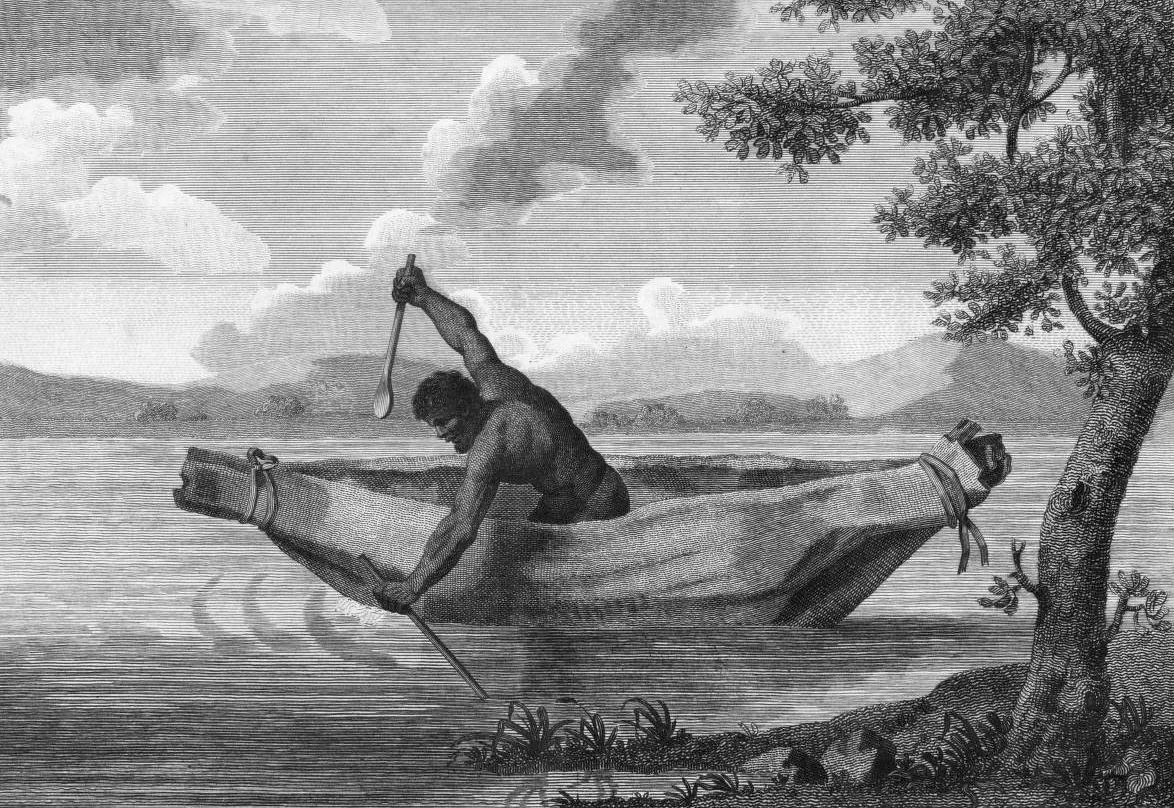
Pemulwuy, a Bidjigal carradhy or cleverman

- Pemulwuy (c. 1750–1802): A Bidjigal carradhy and resistance fighter against the British Empire in what is now known as Sydney.
- Jandamarra (c. 1873–1897): A Bunuba cleverman who waged a guerrilla war against the British Empire in the Kimberley region.
- Butcher Joe Nangan OAM (1900–1989): A jalngunguru (cleverman) and artist of Walmatjarri and Nyikina descent. Received a Medal of the Order of Australia for his art.
- Bahloo: The Gamilaraay moon spirit who used to be a wiringin.
- Johnny Cudgel: A Nyoongar cultural hero and bulyagaduk who was said to be able to transform into a crow and used this power to escape the prison on Wadjemup (Rottnest Island).
- Kevin Djimarr: A Kuninjku man of the Kurulk clan who is a na-kordang and a singer. He was the joint winner of the traditional music award at the 2007 Northern Territory Indigenous Music Awards for his work 'Wurrurrumi Kun-Borrk'.
- Wally Mandarrk (1915–1987): A Barabba marrkdijbu from Arnhem Land who was "able to heal the sick and interact with spirit beings". He was an accomplished bark painter, especially of wayarra and mimih spirits.
- Paddy Compass Namadbara (c. 1892–1978): an accomplished Western Arnhem bark painter and reputed to be one of the most powerful marrkidjbu and leaders of his era.
- Moolbong (1868–1943) the last wiri-ŋan of the Ngiyampaa, who lived among the Wiradjuri after being moved by the Australian Government. A skilled stockman and powerful cleverman; his singing was reputedly powerful and several recordings are kept by AIATSIS.

== Depictions ==
The ABC drama series Cleverman depicts a superheroic cleverman by combining traditions of various clans' clevermen roles and 'hairy man' creatures. However, "hairymen" or 'yowies' are distinct creatures in various Aboriginal clans' traditions that are not necessarily related to cleverman traditions.

== Other similar roles ==
- Kurdaitcha or 'featherfoot': a traditional spiritual assassin and lawman of the Arrernte culture and other Aboriginal cultures. Their harmful 'sorcery' overlaps with many of the killing powers attributed to some clevermen.
- Ngangkari: traditional healers in Aṉangu culture. Often referred to as synonymous with 'cleverman' in sources.

== See also ==
- Cleverman (TV series)
- Australian Aboriginal religion and mythology
- Australian Aboriginal culture
- Australian Aboriginal English
- Maban
- Nocebo
