= Nimanburru =

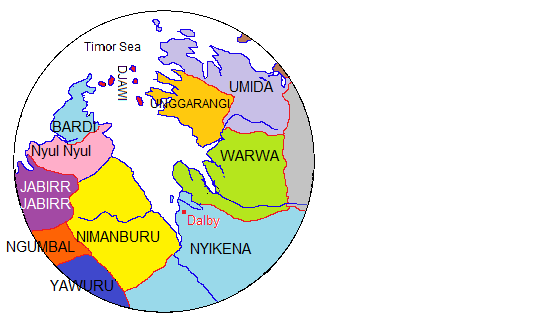
Traditional lands of Aboriginal tribes around Derby, WA

The Nimanburu were an Aboriginal Australian people of the Kimberley region of Western Australia.

== Language ==
The Nimanburu language was one of the Nyulnyulan languages. Their speech was described by other Aboriginal informants as a "heavy" dialect of the language spoken by the Warrwa.

== Country ==
Norman Tindale estimate Nimanburu tribal lands to extend over roughly 1,200 square miles (3,100 km^{2}) from the King Sound coast, around Repulse Point southwards to the swamp plain where the Fraser River debouches into the sea. Their inland extension ran as far as the headwaters of that river.

== People ==
Despite being territorially a coastal people, the Nimanburu refrained from seafaring, and were not known to employ rafts as other contiguous groups in the King Sound did.

== Alternative names ==
- Nimanboro, Nimanbur, Ninambur
- Wadiabulu (Nyigina exonym)

== Sources ==
- "AIATSIS map of Indigenous Australia". AIATSIS. 14 May 2024.
- "Tindale Tribal Boundaries" (PDF). Department of Aboriginal Affairs, Western Australia. September 2016. Archived from the original (PDF) on 8 March 2016.
- Tindale, Norman Barnett (1974). "Nimanburu (WA)". Aboriginal Tribes of Australia: Their Terrain, Environmental Controls, Distribution, Limits, and Proper Names. Australian National University. Archived from the original on 20 March 2020.
