= Myroodah =

Pastoral lease in Western Australia

Coordinates: 18.122°S 124.269°E

Location in Western Australia

Myroodah or Myroodah Station is a pastoral lease that once operated as a sheep station but presently operates as a cattle station located in Western Australia.

Situated about 16 kilometres (10 mi) south east of Looma and about 112 kilometres (70 mi) south east of Derby in the Kimberley region, the property is currently owned by the Indigenous Land Corporation and occupies an area 401,944 acres (162,661 ha). It is south of the Fitzroy River and runs back to the edge of the Great Sandy Desert. It has a range of soil types from the black soil of the flood plains to the red sandhills and spinifex country. The manager since 2011 is Chris Daniell and the property runs approximately 23,000 head of Brahman cattle mostly for the live export trade from Broome.

Both the Margaret River and Fitzroy River severely flooded in 1894, so much so that the rivers that are normally about 20 miles (32 km) apart were united for at least two days. Heavy losses were expected at Myroodah similar to the losses at Yeeda and Mount Anderson Stations.

Two landing strips were cleared at Myroodah in 1946 for the mail plane to land on when Upper Liveringa's strip, located across the river and 7 miles (11 km) away, was unavailable. The first time the strip was to be used, no ground sheets, to indicate safe landing, had been put out so the plane dropped the mail and continued its run.

The property was stocked with about 28,000 sheep in 1947, of which 13,000 were lost while mustering them for shearing. The station manager, Stephen Godbhaer, claimed that the late rains caused phenomenal growth of the cork screw grass, forming a jungle through which it was impossible to drive them.

The 1951 wool clip of 185 bales had to be transported off the property by a Douglas DC-3 aircraft after the Fitzroy River had become impassable and the wool had to reach Derby urgently to be in time to be shipped to England.

== See also ==
- List of ranches and stations
- List of pastoral leases in Western Australia
