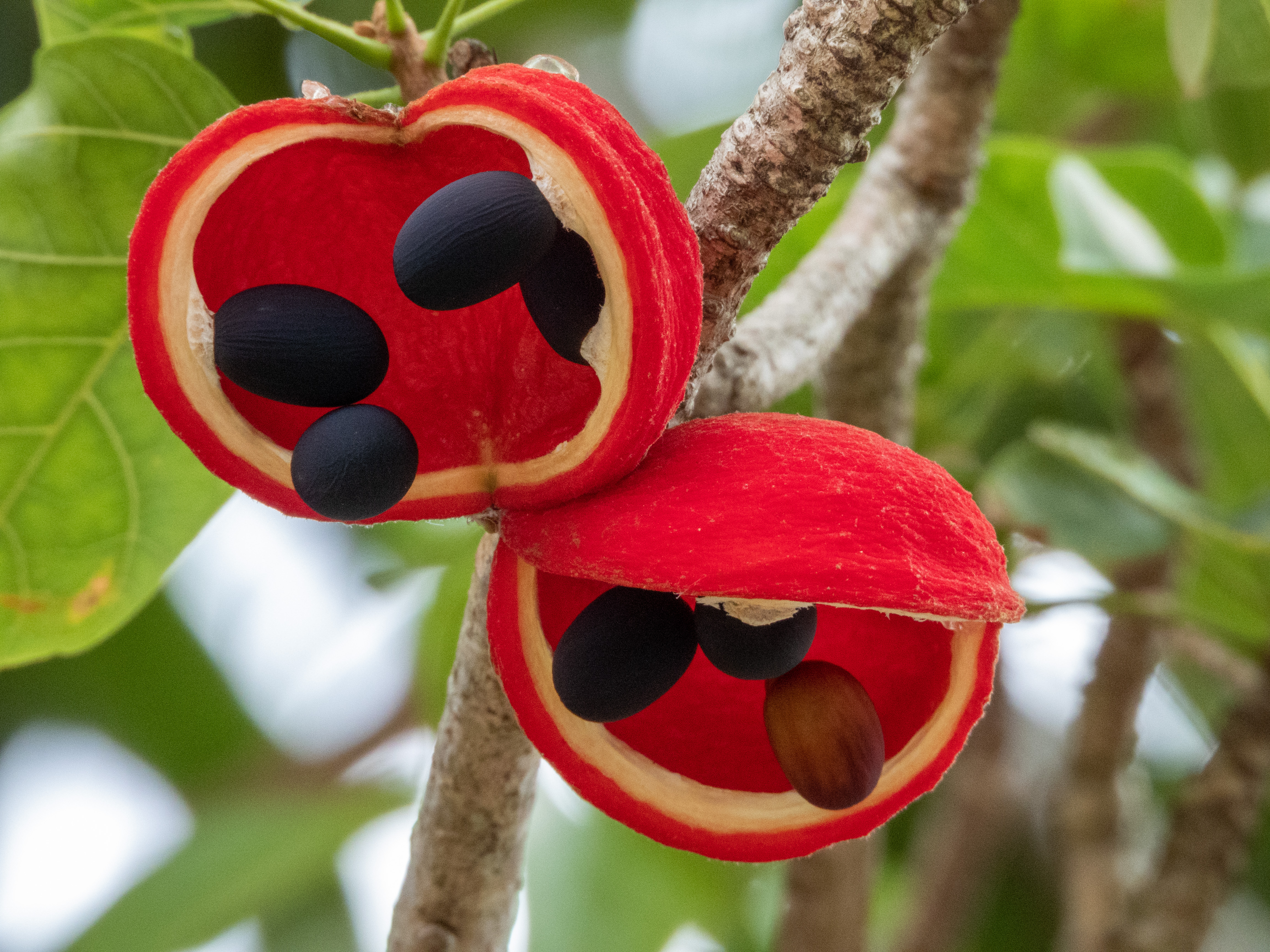
- Seed capsule and seeds

Conservation status
- Least Concern (IUCN 3.1)

Scientific classification
- Kingdom: Plantae
- Clade: Tracheophytes
- Clade: Angiosperms
- Clade: Eudicots
- Clade: Rosids
- Order: Malvales
- Family: Malvaceae
- Genus: Sterculia
- Species: S. quadrifida

Binomial name
- Sterculia quadrifida R.Br.

= Sterculia quadrifida =

Peanut tree

Species of plant in the mallow family

Sterculia quadrifida, also known as the peanut tree, monkey nut or red-fruited kurrajong is a small tree that grows in some forests of New Guinea and Australia.

== Description ==
The tree grows to a height of 30 m (98 ft) and has a spreading deciduous canopy. The bark is a light grey and the leaves are dark green and broad egg-shaped or sometimes heart-shaped at the base. The flowers, which are greenish-yellow and are borne in small clusters in the upper axils, occur from November to January (summer in Australia).

Seed pods are orange outside and orange or red inside when ripe. These pods contain up to 8 black seeds that taste like raw peanuts.

== Distribution and habitat ==
It grows in the rainforests, vine thickets, and gallery forests of New Guinea and northern Australia.

== Uses ==
The seeds are edible after removing the bitter black coating.

The leaves and bark are used medicinally by indigenous Australians and in Indonesia.

The bark is used by indigenous Australians in their traditional weaving techniques to make baskets and other products.

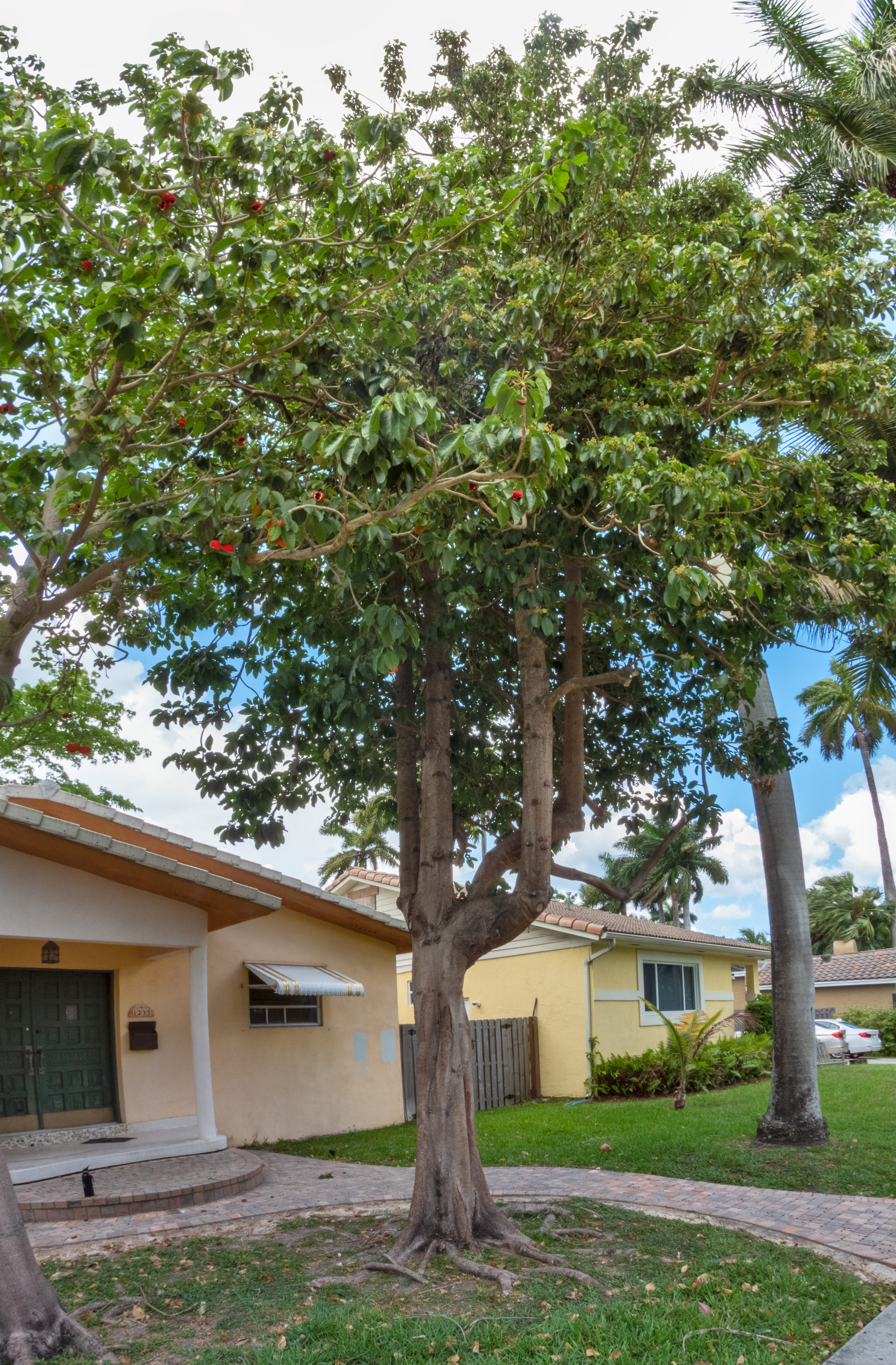
Tree

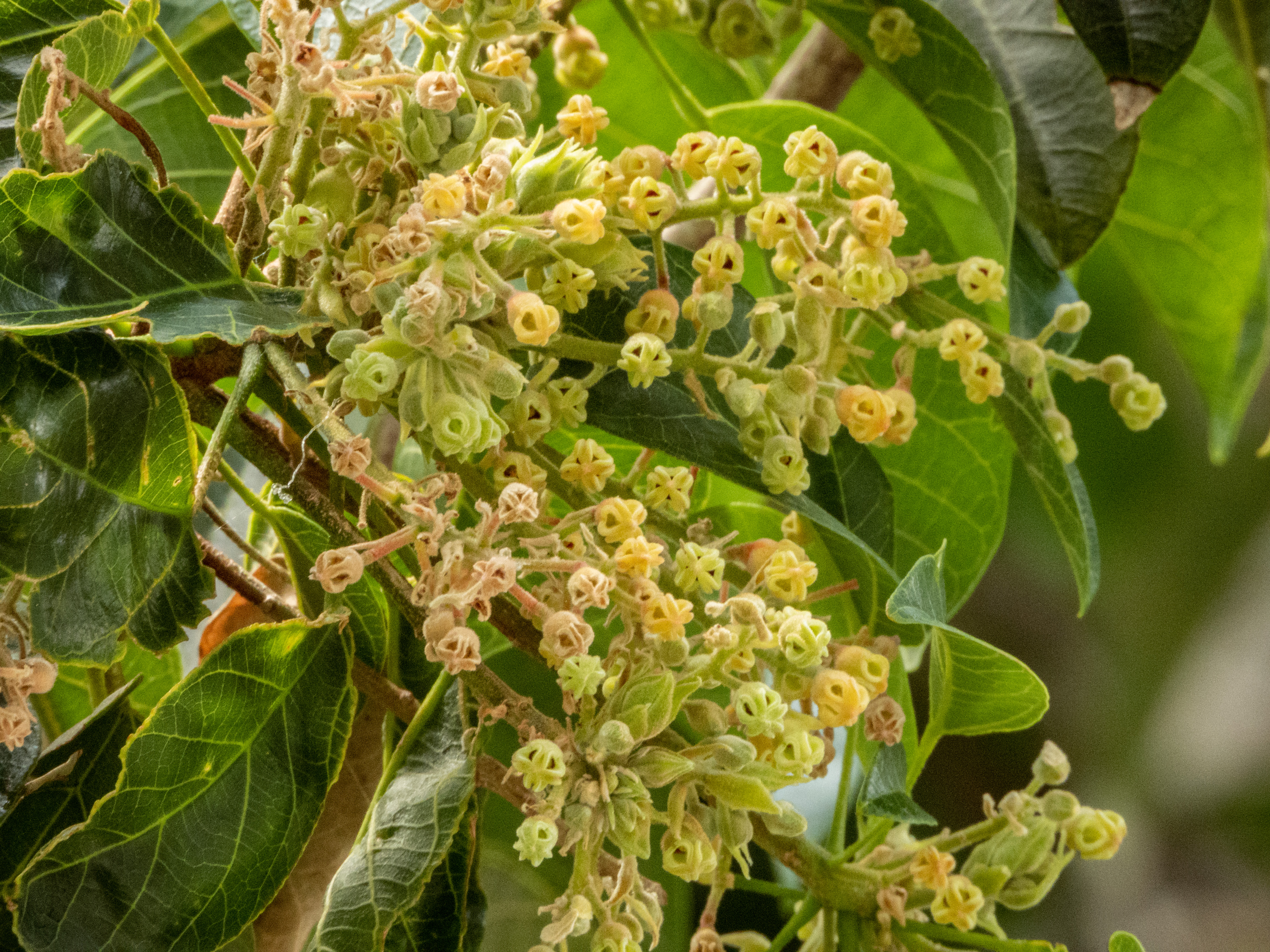
Flowers

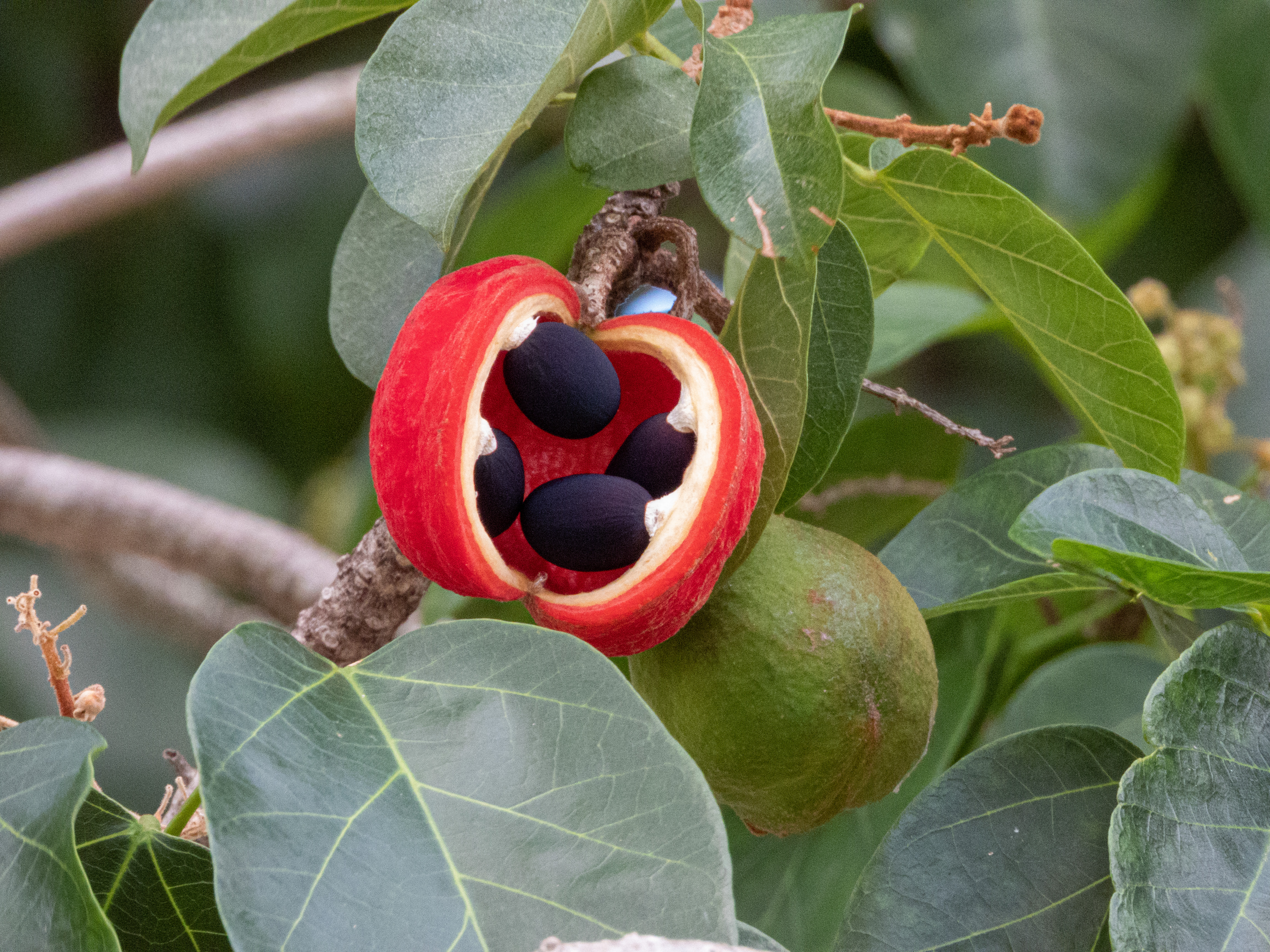
Ripe fruit

== Other common names ==
Alternative common names for this species include kuman, orange-fruited kurrajong, orange-fruited sterculia, red-fruited kurrajong, smooth-seeded kurrajong, white crowsfoot and small-flowered kurrajong.
