= Nimanburru language =

Extinct language

Nimanbur
- Region: Australia
- Ethnicity: Nimanburu
- Extinct: by 1982
- Language family: Nyulnyulan: Western; Nimanbur

Language codes
- ISO 639-3: nmp
- Glottolog: nima1245
- AIATSIS: K9
- ELP: Nimanburru

Nimanburru is an extinct Western Nyulnyulan language formerly spoken on the eastern shore of the Dampier Peninsula in the north-west of Australia. Archival records exist in the Australian Institute of Aboriginal and Torres Strait Islander Studies and some of the material in Hermann Nekes and Ernest Ailred Worms' Australian Languages is from the language.

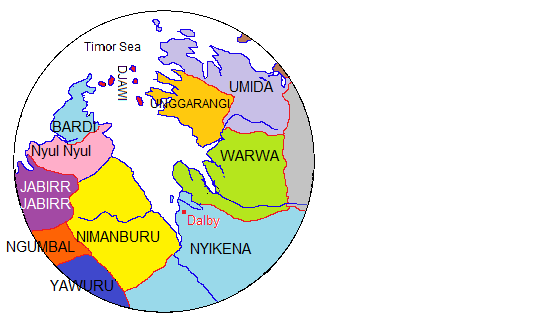
Traditional lands of Australian Aboriginal tribes around Derby, Western Australia
