= Riji =

Pubic coverings made of pearl shells

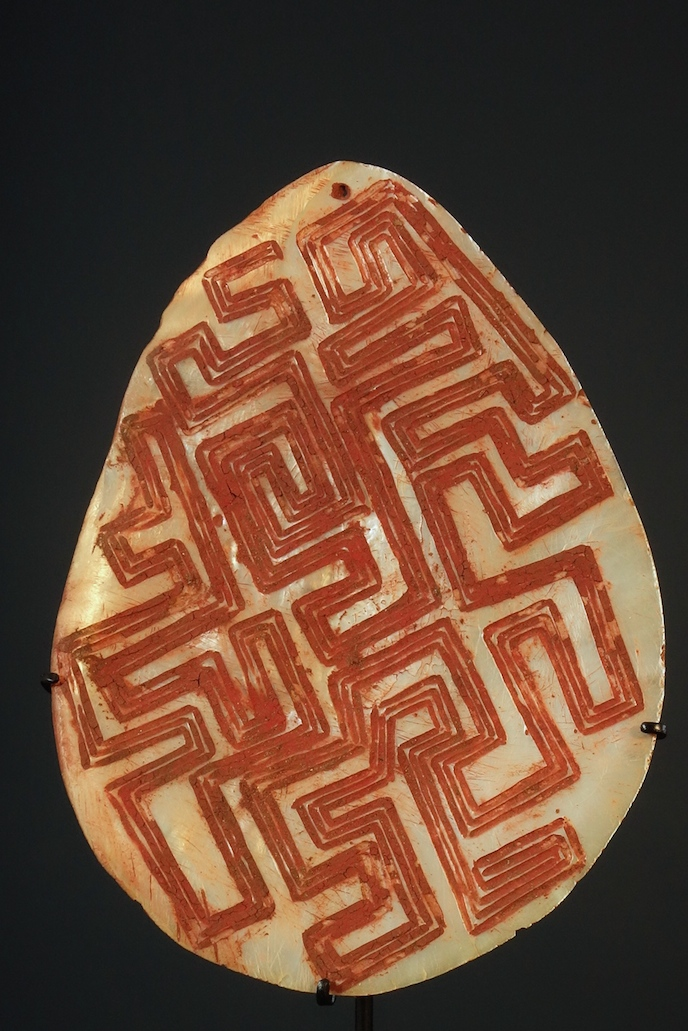
A riji from the Kimberley, WA

Riji are the pearl shells traditionally worn by Aboriginal men in Northwest Australia. They are worn as pubic coverings, like a loin cloth, and attached with hairstring from a belt or band around the waist. Only men initiated to the highest degree could traditionally wear them. Today special ceremonies mark the occasion when boys are given riji to mark their transition to adulthood, a time of great joy for families.

Before being decorated, the pearl shell is known as guwan. Lines known as ramu, often in a sacred pattern or depicting a traditional story, are carved onto the guwan, at which point it becomes a riji. One of the unique patterns used in the Kimberley region of Western Australia is a pattern of interlocking designs. The incised designs are highlighted with a mixture of ochre and Spinifex resin, which is rubbed into the grooves. They carry deep cultural significance among Aboriginals.

The word "riji" is from the Bardi language and means "shell". Another word for it is jakuli.

== Description ==
Coastal Aboriginal tribes along the Northwest coast would collected, cleaned and shaped guwans (undecorated pearl shells). Shells were normally from gold-lipped pearl oysters, and harvested when tides were at very low equinox. They would then incise onto them ramu (lines that form a design or pattern). Sometimes, colour is added by rubbing pigment mixtures of ochre and spinifex resin into the shell's grooves. Other ingredients included animal fat, or powdered charcoal in order to highlight ramu designs. The shell's band is created from hair, including human hair.

The guwan are sometimes made into either a binji binji (smaller carved shell worn as a headpiece) or as shell clusters worn as a hairpiece. However, they are normally worn with a belt or band around the wearer's waist, with the shell covering the male genitalia. All the shells are worn by only men, while riji making was done by both men and women.

== History ==
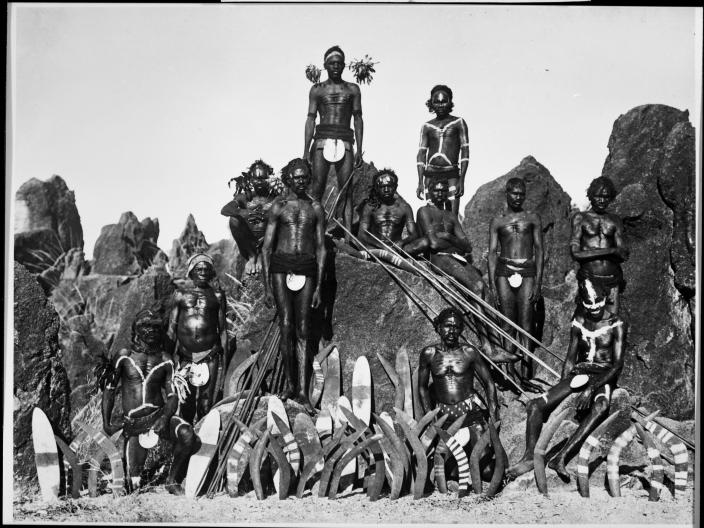
Bardi-Jawi people wearing riji on Jackson Island in King Sound, WA in 1917

=== Pearls among Aboriginals ===
The coastal area of the Kimberley and the surrounding region is home to pearl-producing organisms. Pearls have been valued by Aboriginal tribes of the Kimberley region for a long time, with a pearl found in Widgingarri dating back 22,000 years ago and being located 200 kilometres (120 mi) from where the shoreline would've been. Alongside this, evidence of shell movement from the region goes back 32,000 years ago. However, pearl shells were more highly prized than pearls.

Both riji and guwans were objects of great value and were traded with inland Aboriginal people along ancient trade routes over vast areas of the continent. Pearl shells originating from Kimberley region have been discovered in Central Australia, southern Western Australia, South Australia, and western Queensland.

Often plain pearl shells were decorated further along trade routes, far from their place of origin.

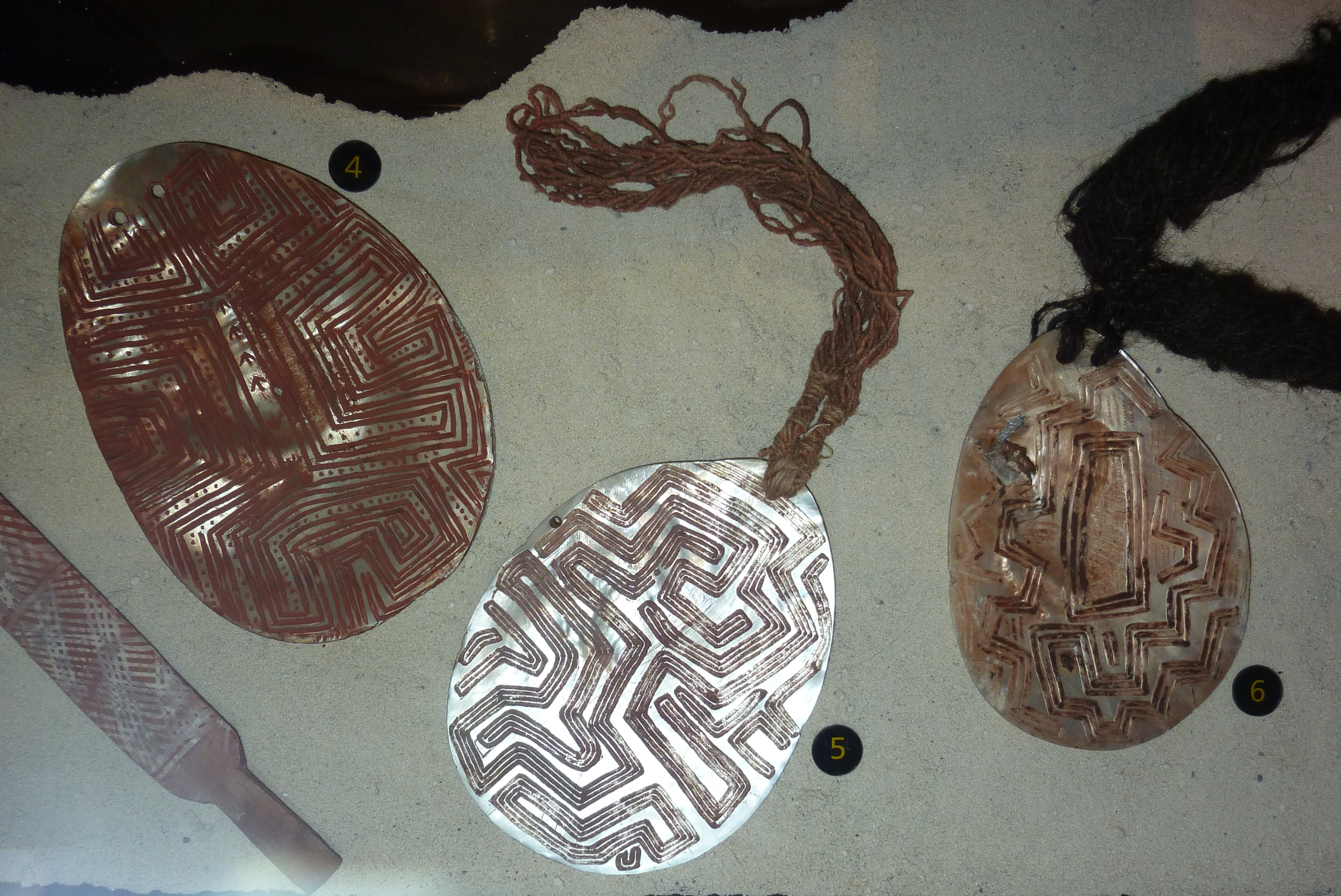
A variety of rijis

=== Modern history ===
The first European to identify riji was French explorer Louis de Freycinet in 1818 at Shark Bay, where he later wrote that he saw “an old man painted with stripes of various colors and distinguished from the rest by a shell hanging from his girdle”.

Aboriginal artists Aubrey Tigan and Butcher Joe Nangan created riji out of mother-of-pearl buttons and cloth.

Artists still make riji today in the Broome area. Some use the older, sacred patterns, while others choose to use more modern designs. Modern production of riji for traditional and tourist use now normally incorporates modern tools into the creation stage.

== Significance ==
Among the Aboriginal tribes of the Northwest, riji carry special significance to them. Religiously, they are associated with water, as well as spiritual or healing powers, and life. When used by maban (powerful spiritual men), riji were believed to have the ability to bring rainfall, heal the sick, determine the guilty, and attract women. Bardi people equate the light reflecting off the shells to lightning flashes, which are prominent during the monsoon, and to lights flashing off the cheeks of the Rainbow Serpent, who is closely linked to water and rain.

Riji were also given to boys in coming of age and initiation ceremonies.
