= Cleverman (TV series) =

2016 Australian television series

- Genre: Drama; Dystopian fiction; Science fiction; Supernatural; Philosophical fiction
- Written by: Michael Miller; Jon Bell; Jane Allen
- Directed by: Wayne Blair; Leah Purcell
- Starring: Hunter Page-Lochard; Rob Collins; Deborah Mailman; Ryan Corr; Stef Dawson; Iain Glen; Frances O'Connor
- Countries of origin: Australia; New Zealand; United States
- Original languages: English; Gumbaynggirr
- No. of series: 2
- No. of episodes: 7

Production
- Executive producers: Sally Riley; Kylie du Fresne; Ben Grant; Martin Baynton; Adam Fratto; Jan David Frouman; Amelie Kienlin
- Camera setup: Single-camera
- Production companies: Goalpost Pictures; Pūkeko Pictures; Red Arrow International; Sundance Studios; ABC TV

Original release
- Network: ABC (Australia); SundanceTV (US)
- Release: 1 June 2016 – 2 August 2017

Cleverman is an Australian television drama program based on an original concept by Ryan Griffen. The series premiered on 1 June 2016 on SundanceTV in the United States and 2 June (other side of International Date Line) on ABC in Australia.

The six-part drama series reimagines several stories of the Aboriginal Dreaming in a modern, superheroic context, and reflects on racism, asylum seekers and border protection. Its central story revolves around two estranged Gumbaynggirr brothers who are forced together to fight for their own survival when one of them is passed the mantle of the "Cleverman". Creatures from the Dreaming also feature in the series' real world dystopian landscape.

The series was renewed for a second season on 2 June 2016, set six months later, having received A$450,000 in funding from Screen NSW. The second season aired another 6 episodes in 2017, concluding the series with a total of 12 episodes.

== Cleverman ==
The Cleverman is an important figure in many Australian Aboriginal cultures. Series creator Ryan Griffen describes the Cleverman as "like the Pope of the Dreamtime ... the conduit between the present and the Dreaming". The version in the television series combines many Cleverman traditions from different Aboriginal clans to create a superheroic version, with powers relating to the Dreaming's connection to past, present and future. Koen West, the protagonist of the series displays his powers through both seasons either from instinct or learned by experience. He can heal instantly, and can not die by conventional methods, but can be hurt or killed either by a being from the spiritual plane such as the Namorrodor, or the tree sap his brother Waruu used from their childhood tree that he forged into a dagger. Koen can receive visions from touching others seeing future events, and he can shape shift into a bird when escaping or needing to sneak into a building. He also has access to a spiritual energy shot dubbed the 'Blue Blast', a ball of energy fired from his chest that when it hits its target it separates them from their soul thus when they die they fade to nothingness. Koen can swallow the soul if he chooses to erase it from existence or return it to its body by killing the host and resurrecting them. As Cleverman, Koen uses the Nulla Nulla, a traditional Aboriginal War Club also used by the Hairies.

== Hairypeople ==
The Hairypeople or "Hairies" are designed by Jacob ("Jake") Nash, production designer for the Australian Aboriginal Bangarra Dance Theatre, and realised by the Weta Workshop, known for their work on The Lord of The Rings and other fantasy and science fiction films. The Hairypeople in Cleverman are inspired by Australian Aboriginal mythology of hairymen drawn from multiple Aboriginal peoples, including the Gamilaraay and Bundjalung people of northern New South Wales. In the series, they speak Gumbaynggirr, another language from northern New South Wales.

In the world of Cleverman, Hairies are stronger and hardier than humans, covered in thick facial and body hair, and have tough, sharp fingernails. They also have much longer lifespans. They share some things with Aboriginal Australians, including a knowledge of land, culture and the Dreaming. Their DNA differs enough from humans to be considered a different species. They come to the notice of modern human society six months prior to the beginning of the series, in an event known as "Emergence Day". Those who choose to live their lives as they always have—covered in a coat of hair and speaking their traditional languages—are confined to "The Zone" by a fearful government. To escape, some Hairies become "shavers", learning to speak English and removing their body hair in order to blend in with human society.

== Cast ==
=== Regulars ===
- Hunter Page-Lochard as Koen West, Waruu's half-brother, an outcast who lives with his friends Blair and Ash. To fund their pub, 'The Couch', he smuggles Hairies out of the Zone then turns them over to the CA for the monetary reward. This results in the death of a young Hairy girl, Jyra, causing him self-doubt. After the passing of his Uncle Jimmy, Koen inherits the powers of the Cleverman along with the Nulla Nulla. He has a toxic relationship with his half brother Waruu, which grows worse with jealousy and hatred as Waruu always aspired to be Cleverman. Over the course of the series, Koen begins to gradually accept his role as Cleverman, finding redemption in his previous actions and facing up to Waruu. Koen returns to the Zone and kills the Namorrodor; a demon who killed Jimmy and others, usurping Waruu as leader of the community. In Season 2, Koen is visited by Jimmy's spirit who teaches more about the role of Cleverman and how to control his abilities. He learns about his Aunt Linda's part in his parents' deaths, but forgives her and sets off to finally save his Hairy friends and fight Waruu. In the end both are critically wounded, with Koen eventually swallowing Waruu's soul as he passes on from the injuries he sustained from their fight.
- Rob Collins as Waruu West, Koen's older half brother, an activist for equal rights amongst humans and subhumans, who hoped to be chosen to be the next Cleverman. Married to Nerida and father of Alinta; having an affair with Belinda Frosche. He lives in the Zone with his family and is the leader of the community. He begins to become unhinged due to the "wrongful" appointment of Koen as Cleverman and repeatedly tries to kill him. After he loses respect from the Zone and his family due to his adultery and increasingly violent nature, he becomes ruthless in his quest to change the fates of Hairies and kill Koen. He, along with Slade, creates a serum that turns Hairies into humans to continue his cohesion plan but is undermined by Koen's attempts to stop him. He gradually starts turning into a Hairy due to Slade's experiments and finds a way to finally kill his brother using tree sap he forged into a knife. He loses to Koen in the end when after stabbing him in the stomach In their final battle he's hit with the Blue Blast losing his soul and eventually dying into nothingness.
- Deborah Mailman as Aunty Linda, estranged mother of Waruu and adoptive mother of Koen; dying of cancer and is knowledgeable of the Dreaming and history of Cleverman. She helps Koen with the Hairies who escaped from the Zone and her secret of killing Koen's parents are revealed. She is forgiven by Koen who returns her soul to her when she was caught in his Blue Blast.
- Iain Glen as Jarrod Slade, married to Charlotte and an enterprising man whose agenda involves the Hairypeople and Koen. He had a partnership with Uncle Jimmy in order to obtain his secrets. He creates two formulas, one which can grant people the abilities of Hairies with side effects of becoming one or passing it on to their offspring like he did his, and another that turns Hairies human. He eventually dies when his madness from his experiments make him try to forcefully abort his wife's unborn child ending in her stabbing him in the neck with a scalpel with the last image of him being locked in darkness as he was hit with Blue Blast.
- Frances O'Connor as Dr. Charlotte Cleary, married to Slade, yet is unsuspecting of his agenda. A humanitarian, she runs a free clinic in the Zone. She cares greatly for the Hairies and hates the prejudice and mistreatment done to them. She becomes pregnant unaware Slade had inadvertently made it into a Hairy due to his experiments. She's captured by Jarli who takes her to his tribe to protect the child as he cares for its safety. She returns to stop Slade but kills him in self defense when he tries to abort the baby.
- Ryan Corr as Blair Finch, Koen's childhood friend and the boyfriend of Ash.
- Tasma Walton as Araluen, a Hairy woman, caring wife of Boondee and mother of Djukara, Latani and Jyra. Was captured and forced to work in Frankie's brothel, servicing Geoff Matthews.
- Tony Briggs as Boondee, a Hairy man, protective husband of Araluen and father to Djukara, Latani and Jyra. Still held in containment.
- Stef Dawson as Ash Kerry, Blair's girlfriend who is in a complex relationship with Koen.
- Jada Alberts as Nerida West, Waruu's wife and Alinta's mother. Has a strong relationship with Linda and knows of her husband's adultery. Lives in the Zone.
- Tamala Shelton as Alinta West, Waruu and Nerida's daughter. An ally to the Hairypeople and resentful of the adulterous relationships of both her father and mother. Lives in the Zone.
- Rarriwuy Hick as Latani, a young Hairy woman, daughter of Araluen and Boondee, sister to Djukara and Jyra. The only member of her family to avoid capture, she makes her way to the Zone and befriends Alinta.
- Tysan Towney as Djukara, a young Hairy man, son of Araluen and Boondee, brother to Latani and Jyra. He is very hot-tempered, vengeful and easily influenced. Waruu and Harry free him from a CA containment centre and take him to the Zone with Mungo and Kulya.
- Andrew McFarlane as Geoff Matthews, the Minister for Immigration and Border Protection, who is against the Hairypeople, though his true agenda is to redevelop the Zone. He is a client of Frankie's who is regularly serviced by Araluen.
- Marcus Graham as Steve McIntyre, who directs the Containment Authority (CA), a private security outfit operating under the authority of Matthews but in the employ of Slade.
- Rachael Blake as Marion Frith, a politician who replaces Matthews, and attempts to bring the CA under tighter government control.
- Clarence Ryan as Jarli, a Hairy warrior from the Bindawu tribe. He is extremely antagonistic towards the humans, or "skins", and casually kills them when opportunities arise. He is unapologetic about Hairypeople who die as a result of his actions, impatient with his elders, and seeks to provoke a war.
- Luke Ford as Tim Dolan, a former police officer who was forced into private-sector security work for the CA, but sympathizes with the Hairypeople. He is often partnered with Hendricks.

=== Recurring Guests ===
- Alexis Lane as Kora, a Dreaming spirit who was summoned by Uncle Jimmy prior to his death; needs Koen to send her back to her dimension.
- Leeanna Walsman as Belinda Frosche, a Channel 8 reporter; has a sexual relationship with Waruu.
- Jack Charles as Uncle Jimmy West, the original Cleverman who chose Koen to succeed him over Waruu. Was in league with Jarrod Slade before he had himself killed by a Dreaming creature called "Namorrodor." He returns as a ghost to help train Koen.
- Adam Briggs as Maliyan, a violent-minded Hairy man who clashes with Waruu. A community leader in the Zone.
- Lynette Curran as Virgil, a reclusive yet inventive woman who aids Latani, making her human contact lenses.
- Robyn Nevin as Jane O'Grady, a talk-show host who discusses the Hairypeople with Waruu and Matthews.
- Josh McConville as Dickson
- Mansoor Noor as McIntyre 2IC
- Rhondda Findleton as Frankie, a vicious brothel madam who purchases Araluen.
- Isaac Drandic as Harry, a Hairy man and Waruu's right hand. Lives in the Zone.
- Katie Wall as Rowena, a drug addict working as Frankie's assistant.
- Miranda Tapsell as Lena, a Hairy woman who defeats several would be attackers on a bus.
- Rahel Romahn as Ludo
- Sam Parsonson as Taki
- Val Weldon as Jyra, a Hairy girl, daughter of Araluen and Boondee, sister to Djukara and Latani. She is killed following her family's capture; her spirit possesses another Hairy child until Koen releases her, earning her forgiveness.
- Aileen Huynh as Dr Everick, a scientist in Slade's employ, experimenting on Kora and Hairypeople.
- Nancy Denis as Eve, a nurse working with Charlotte.
- Trevor Jamieson as Uncle Max, an Aboriginal elder who runs a gym in the Zone.
- Kamil Ellis as Mungo, a Hairy boy who escapes capture with Djukara and Kulya and hides in the Zone.
- Waverley Stanley Jr. as Kulya, a Hairy boy who escapes capture with Djukara and Mungo and hides in the Zone.
- Mark Winter as Bill Hendricks, Tim's partner in the CA, a sadist who preys on Hairypeople. He is responsible for Mungo's death and later torments Latani.
- Tessa Rose as Yani / Gwen, an older Hairy woman who had lost all her children and, tired of living in fear, volunteered for the Inclusion Initiative. Happily reborn as Gwen, she does not want to leave her new home.
- Les Chantery as Deepak Malhotra
- Nicholas Hope as Dr. Mitchell
- Alan Dukes as Nurse Robert
- Israel Dedeigbo as Daku
- Anthony John Ah See as Gawu
- Alec Doomadgee as Darana
- Lasarus Ratuere as Bakanah
- Taylor Ferguson as Audie Martin, a young woman who becomes romantically interested in Koen.
- Megan Hind as Taylor Diaz
- Lisa Flanagan as Harah
- Sarah Armanious as Lucia
- Tasneem Roc as Sarah Gottlieb, a journalist
- David Barnett as Riwarri, a Hairy and companion of Jarli
- Megan O'Connell as Farugia, a CA officer

== Broadcast ==
The series premiered on 1 June 2016 on SundanceTV in the United States and 2 June (other side of International Date Line) on ABC in Australia. Series 2 premiered on those same networks on 28 (29) June 2017.

In February 2018, Series 1 began broadcasting in Canada on both T+E and Aboriginal Peoples Television Network (aptn). In April 2018, aptn continued with Series 2.

== Episodes ==
=== Series 1 (2016) ===
| No. overall | No. in series | Title | Directed by | Written by | Original release date | Viewers (millions) |
|---|---|---|---|---|---|---|
| 1 | 1 | "First Contact" | Wayne Blair | Michael Miller & Jon Bell | 1 June 2016 (US) | 197,000 (US) |
| 1 | 1 | "First Contact" | Wayne Blair | Michael Miller & Jon Bell | 2 June 2016 (AU) | 452,000 (AU) |
Koen West and Blair Finch smuggle a Hairy family into a vacant apartment, then immediately call the Containment Authority (CA) for the fugitive reward. Reporter Belinda Frosche films their apprehension, in which Djukara and Araluen resist and Jyra is killed. Djukara is taken to a containment centre and branded. Network executive Jarrod Slade repeatedly broadcasts the killing against the government's wishes. Uncle Jimmy brings Koen the Nulla Nulla war club. Slade pays Jimmy to put a spirit into a corpse, and later Jimmy is killed by a creature. Waruu West, a community leader in the Zone, learns that Koen is the duplicitous smuggler and has Harry sever his finger. However, the digit reattaches and Koen finds he has regenerative powers.
| 2 | 2 | "Containment" | Wayne Blair | Michael Miller & Jon Bell | 8 June 2016 (US) | 140,000 (US) |
| 2 | 2 | "Containment" | Wayne Blair | Michael Miller & Jon Bell | 9 June 2016 (AU) | 330,000 (AU) |
Djukara attacks the containment centre guards and is beaten. Boondee is punished in his place and Djukara submits to being shaved. Araluen is spared execution but sold to Frankie. Latani is aided by lonely neighbour Virgil. Koen visits Aunty Linda, his foster mother, who tells him that being the Cleverman is his chance to start over. He has painful visions which compel him to a secret lab where he retrieves Kora. Waruu participates in a TV interview with politician Matthews, but an ambush piece implies that a boy and Jimmy were killed by a Hairy.
| 3 | 3 | "A Free Ranger" | Leah Purcell | Michael Miller | 15 June 2016 (US) | 158,000 (US) |
| 3 | 3 | "A Free Ranger" | Leah Purcell | Michael Miller | 16 June 2016 (AU) | 257,000 (AU) |
Waruu and Harry sneak into a containment centre to film the living conditions. They free Djukara, Mungo and Kulya, but Djukara is shot by a guard who Waruu kills. Dr Charlotte Cleary saves Djukara with a transfusion from Maliyan. McIntyre mutilates the guard's body to match the other attacks, provoking Matthews. Latani hides in a salon; the staff capture her to sell her hair on the Internet, but she escapes. She finds her way to the Zone and argues with Djukara. Araluen is groomed for Frankie's clientele. Slade meets Waruu and later Koen, admitting to working with Jimmy, combining ancient knowledge with cutting-edge technology. Koen tries to communicate with Kora. Ash confronts him over the vision he had of her.
| 4 | 4 | "Sun and Moon" | Leah Purcell | Michael Miller | 22 June 2016 (US) | 123,000 (US) |
| 4 | 4 | "Sun and Moon" | Leah Purcell | Michael Miller | 23 June 2016 (AU) | 241,000 (AU) |
Eight people are killed at an old-age home. Waruu reluctantly goes to Koen, identifying the creature, a namorrodor, and warning that more people will die unless he acts. Djukara goes to free Boondee from the containment centre, but finds the place abandoned. Protestors turn back food deliveries to the Zone; Waruu suspects political involvement and tries to meet Matthews, who is at the brothel with Araluen. He leaves to meet Belinda for a story on the Zone, but is waylaid by McIntyre who threatens him for the Hairy fugitives; Waruu notes his evidence proving the Hairies' innocence in the guard's death and that the scene was staged. Belinda is not well-received at the Zone, and Nerida advises Waruu to get his act together before he loses everything. Slade begins human experimentation; he tests a new approach on himself, gaining Hairy strength and endurance. He sends McIntyre to retrieve Kora; in a failed hostage exchange Ash is killed.
| 5 | 5 | "A Man of Vision" | Wayne Blair | Michael Miller | 29 June 2016 (US) | 146,000 (US) |
| 5 | 5 | "A Man of Vision" | Wayne Blair | Michael Miller | 30 June 2016 (AU) | 217,000 (AU) |
Slade sets up a fake fertility clinic to implant Charlotte with a hybrid genes; Charlotte later finds the foetus is weeks ahead in its development. Slade gives Waruu A$30 million to rebuild the Zone in exchange for Koen. McIntyre admits to Matthews that he staged the guard's death, which put public opinion behind his agenda; Matthews decides to take advantage of this by raiding the Zone despite the likelihood of a carnage. Koen and Blair flee to the Zone with Kora, who Aunty Linda believes is an ancestral spirit that needs to be sent home. Linda arranges a meet with Waruu, who says a higher priority is killing the namorrodor, but the brothers get into a fight. Afterwards, Nerida confronts Waruu over killing the guard, and Djukara confronts Koen for destroying his family. Koen loses confidence, and Linda makes him lead a smoking ceremony to release a spirit from an ill child. Koen finds that the spirit is Jyra, who smiles at him before leaving.
| 6 | 6 | "Terra Nullius" | Wayne Blair | Michael Miller & Jane Allen | 6 July 2016 (US) | 129,000 (US) |
| 6 | 6 | "Terra Nullius" | Wayne Blair | Michael Miller & Jane Allen | 7 July 2016 (AU) | 232,000 (AU) |
Koen takes Kora to an old fig tree Jimmy had shown him and releases her back to her world, restoring the balance. Cages are assembled at the edge of the Zone, while the Hairypeople inside arm themselves for a fight. Charlotte suffers abdominal pains and panics when she can't find the fertility clinic. The CA orders humans to leave the Zone, which they say is a haven for criminals. Slade tells Waruu that Matthews is seeking to redevelop the Zone, and gives Waruu video of Matthews with Araluen to discredit him. He insists that Waruu deliver Koen. However, when Waruu learns that Slade is behind the CA and thus the Hairy disappearances, he tells Koen about Slade's activities. They go to Slade's lab and Koen attacks him but is overwhelmed by Slade's enhanced strength. Slade admits to deaths in his experiments, and Waruu takes his offer to reap the benefits. Mailyan threatens to execute Blair but is shot dead by Waruu, who has taken the drug and manically explains that he obtained title to the Zone, but is stunned at the lack of enthusiasm. The namorrodor reaches the assembly and Waruu confronts it but is knocked back; he protects an ungrateful Linda. Koen, after overpowering Slade, arrives and defeats the creature. While watching the news coverage, Araluen strangles Matthews then escapes. As dawn approaches, the Zone is barricaded and armed against an expected CA assault.

=== Series 2 (2017) ===
| No. overall | No. in series | Title | Directed by | Written by | Original release date | Viewers (millions) |
|---|---|---|---|---|---|---|
| 7 | 1 | "Revival" | Wayne Blair | Stuart Page | 28 June 2017 (US) | 74,000 (US) |
| 7 | 1 | "Revival" | Wayne Blair | Stuart Page | 29 June 2017 (AU) | 151,000 (AU) |
Koen was riddled with bullets when the CA attacked. McIntyre obtains the Nulla Nulla and Koen's corpse, but when Slade opens the bodybag Koen escapes in the form of a hawk. The other Hairy and human prisoners are taken in a CA convoy which is attacked by Jarli, a Hairy warrior, resulting in the deaths of all the guards and 18 prisoners, including Djukara. Nerida escapes with Alinta and Latani, and attacks Tim Dolan to hide in his home. Marion Frith is promoted as minister to take Matthews' place, dismisses McIntyre and ends Slade's contract to operate the CA. The government declares a state of emergency to deal with the fugitive Hairies. Charlotte is soothed after her "panic attack" and encouraged rest by a doctor in Slade's employ. Slade continues taking injections but they are losing potency; he has only three Hairy test subjects at his disposal, one of them Boondee. Waruu moves into a house Slade kept for Jimmy; he attempts to resume his affair with Belinda but realizes he is growing thick body hair. Koen finds Aunty Linda and a score of Hairy fugitives organized by Harry. While they go on a supply run, Mundo is killed by Hendricks.
| 8 | 2 | "Bindawu" | Wayne Blair | Justine Gillmer | 5 July 2017 (US) | 76,000 (US) |
| 8 | 2 | "Bindawu" | Wayne Blair | Justine Gillmer | 6 July 2017 (AU) | 134,000 (AU) |
Jarli is chastised for leaving his people's territory. Waruu, Marion and Slade announce the Inclusion Initiative which will change Hairypeople into humans, ready to be assimilated into society. Slade provides the technology while the government funds complete welfare programs. With Waruu as executive director, the initiative will covertly supply Slade with Hairy DNA for his research. Boondee, using his prison name Trevor, is brought forward as the program's poster child. Slade begins experimenting with the Nulla Nulla and Koen's blood but finds no weaknesses; his assistant dies while exposing it to a weaponized pathogen. Despite her bedrest orders, Charlotte goes to work at a hospital orders tests on herself which show traces of Hairy DNA. Nerida lets Tim leave before his absence is treated as suspicious; he begins to earn her trust when he returns to give her food and a revolver. Meanwhile, Harry finds Araluen at the ruined Zone, where billboards advertise luxury apartments. Learning of Djukara's death, she swears vengeance for her children and attacks Koen when he returns with Mungo's body. While Harry helps Koen train, Audie Martin happens upon them. Koen follows a vision to a camper, where he is greeted by Uncle Jimmy's ghost.
| 9 | 3 | "Dark Clouds" | Wayne Blair | Ryan Griffen | 12 July 2017 (US) | 70,000 (US) |
| 9 | 3 | "Dark Clouds" | Wayne Blair | Ryan Griffen | 13 July 2017 (AU) | 129,000 (AU) |
Slade discovers that the Nulla Nulla also heals its wounds. Jimmy's ghost guides Koen on becoming the Cleverman. Koen carves a war club to defeat an ancestral spirit, but Waruu uses Jimmy's journal to find the same tree and collect a sap which holds its true power. Koen realizes that Linda killed his parents and confirms this from Waruu, who slits his throat and mixes the blood with the sap. Yani, an older Hairy woman tired of hiding, surrenders and goes through the initiative, happily reborn as Gwen. Araluen recognizes Boondee on the news and reunites with him at Bennelong House. Nerida grows closer to Tim but Alinta discovers he is CA. His partner, Hendricks, has been informing to McIntyre. Charlotte confronts Slade about the test result, and demands to see everything about the experiment. However, they are attacked by Jarli.
| 10 | 4 | "Muya" | Leah Purcell | Jada Alberts & Jane Allen | 19 July 2017 (US) | 72,000 (US) |
| 10 | 4 | "Muya" | Leah Purcell | Jada Alberts & Jane Allen | 20 July 2017 (AU) | 136,000 (AU) |
Koen recovers, fights off Waruu and flees. He is concerned about terminally ill Linda: although she killed his parents, he feels guilty that his blue blast will prevent her muya, or spirit, from experiencing an afterlife. At the scene of the incident Koen breathes in Linda's muya then strangles her to return it in death, from which she revives. Jarli brings Charlotte to his people, who agree that the Hairy child must be protected though Charlotte is unwelcome. McIntyre determines that Charlotte was taken into the mountains. Slade tells Marion and blackmails her to give McIntyre full access. Marion pressures Waruu to improve his public image in the absence of progress, but suspects him of leaking information to Slade. On the run, Nerida, Alinta and Latani are captured by the CA including Tim and Hendricks. Tim admits to sheltering them and Hendricks allows him to take Nerida. Hendricks holds a gun to Latani and tells her to run, but she overpowers him. Waruu gains Alinta's release under house arrest with an ankle monitor. Gwen advises Araluen to let Latani find her own way.
| 11 | 5 | "Skin" | Leah Purcell | Jada Alberts & Jane Allen | 26 July 2017 (US) | 62,000 (US) |
| 11 | 5 | "Skin" | Leah Purcell | Jada Alberts & Jane Allen | 27 July 2017 (AU) | 118,000 (AU) |
Nerida goes to Waruu's house for Alinta; he expresses his concern but she rejects him so he calls the CA and Tim rescues her. Alinta finds Jimmy's journal and the story of the jealous brother. Marion scales back her promises for the included Hairies in response to public opinion, and challenges Waruu to bring results or change the public's outlook. Slade's scientists are able to liquify the sap, which cuts through the otherwise indestructible Nulla Nulla. With it he hopes to control Koen and the Dreaming, while also planning to enhance humans to survive coming climatic change. Slade and Waruu become impatient with each other. Learning that Boondee is the same tribe as Jarli, McIntyre uses him as a guide to find Charlotte. Jarli kills McIntyre while Latani is reunited with Boondee. The Bindawu discuss the threat, and Charlotte is allowed to return to convince Slade of his errors. Jarli is discovered caching human technology and is cast out of his tribe. Charlotte goes to Slade's lab but panics and fatally stabs him. Koen raids the inclusion clinic, destroying the stockpile of fluids used, and urges Araluen, who was about to undergo the process, to leave. The CA find the warehouse with the fugitive Hairies and assault it with shoot-to-kill orders. Audie grows closer to Koen who foresees their tearful parting.
| 12 | 6 | "Borrowed Time" | Leah Purcell | Stuart Page | 2 August 2017 (US) | 57,000 (US) |
| 12 | 6 | "Borrowed Time" | Leah Purcell | Stuart Page | 3 August 2017 (AU) | 114,000 (AU) |
Slade finds himself in darkness; over his body, Waruu discovers Charlotte who admits to having a Hairy baby. Marion demands results from Waruu following the clinic raid; he makes inclusion mandatory. Koen decides to move Alinta and Nerida to the Hairies for safety, but discovers Linda the sole survivor. Tim creates a new ID for Nerida and deactivates Alinta's monitor. Waruu tries to reconcile with Alinta but she later runs away; he finds his family with Tim and arrests them. Latani joins Jarli to free the Hairies guarded at Bennelong House. Arulen is reunited with Latani but questions Jarli's plans. Riwarri is killed and Marion demands Waruu take Jarli alive for questioning. Koen clashes with Jarli who is insistent on fighting. However, Araluen sides with Koen as fighting would be suicidal. Latani provides an escape route while Koen distracts the CA by surrendering to Waruu, who takes him to a secluded spot to fight. Using a knife he crafted from the sap, Waruu cuts Koen's war club in half and stabs him. Koen uses the blue blast then breathes in Waruu's muya before they both collapse.

== Awards ==
- 2016: John Hinde Award for Excellence in Science-Fiction Writing at the AWGIEs, for the screenplay

== Critical reception ==
The show has been met with favourable reviews on review aggregator Rotten Tomatoes, where the first season was given a rating of 91% based on reviews from eight critics. The first series of Cleverman received generally favourable reviews on Metacritic scoring a rating of 61/100 based on reviews from seven critics.

A review from the Boston Herald stated, "Cleverman is unlike any other TV miniseries you've seen before. The gritty Australian production uses a sci-fi backdrop to test notions of racial identity and integration with a twist of supernatural terror", and went on to say "The first episode is confusing, introducing a multitude of characters and agendas. Stay with it. The second episode brings several of the characters and the conflicts into focus."

Mike Hale of The New York Times stated that "Cleverman has a rough immediacy in its pacing and cinematography that helps to make up for its deficiencies elsewhere, and if you have an appetite for sci-fi conspiracy thrillers, it's worth sampling." A review from The A.V. Club said "Cleverman is full of potential" but "is too busy building a world to tell a story".

== Ratings ==
The American premiere on 1 June 2016 gained 197,000 viewers, and an 18–49 demo rating of 0.04, while the Australian premiere the following day was watched by 452,000 viewers.
