= Belinda Dann =

Indigenous Australian member of the Stolen Generations

Belinda Dann (4 July 1900 – 9 October 2007) was an Indigenous Australian born as Quinlyn Wardagoo to an Irish cattle station manager and a Nyikina mother in the Lunlungai community in Derby, Western Australia. At the age of 6, 7, or 8 she was taken away and sent to Beagle Bay Mission with other members of the stolen generation. Her name was changed to Belinda Boyd to integrate with White society.

As a teenager she married Matthias Dann, and they helped build Sacred Heart Church at Beagle Bay. In 1927 they moved to Port Hedland, where they initially had to obey a 5 pm curfew for indigenous people as well as request a permit if they had wanted to drink at the pub. The couple raised six children and established St Cecilia's College after the public school was abandoned during World War II. Their daughter Maggie Galvin said her parents instilled in her a passion for education.

Dann remembered her Aboriginal name, and one of her grandsons mentioned it to an Aboriginal girl who had heard of her family. In May 2007 she met her 97-year-old brother, Patty Jungine, for the first time. Jungine died a month later in June 2007, and Dann died four months afterward in Port Hedland at age 107.

Dann's funeral in Port Hedland attracted over 200 mourners on Saturday 27 October 2007, and was followed two weeks later by a traditional ceremony at Lunlungaim, where a lock of her hair was buried alongside her mother's grave.
