= Australian Aboriginal fibrecraft =

Fibrecraft used by Aboriginal Australians

Australian Aboriginal fibrecraft refers to the various ways Aboriginal Australians create fibres traditionally. Materials used depend on where the people live in Australia.

== Bark ==
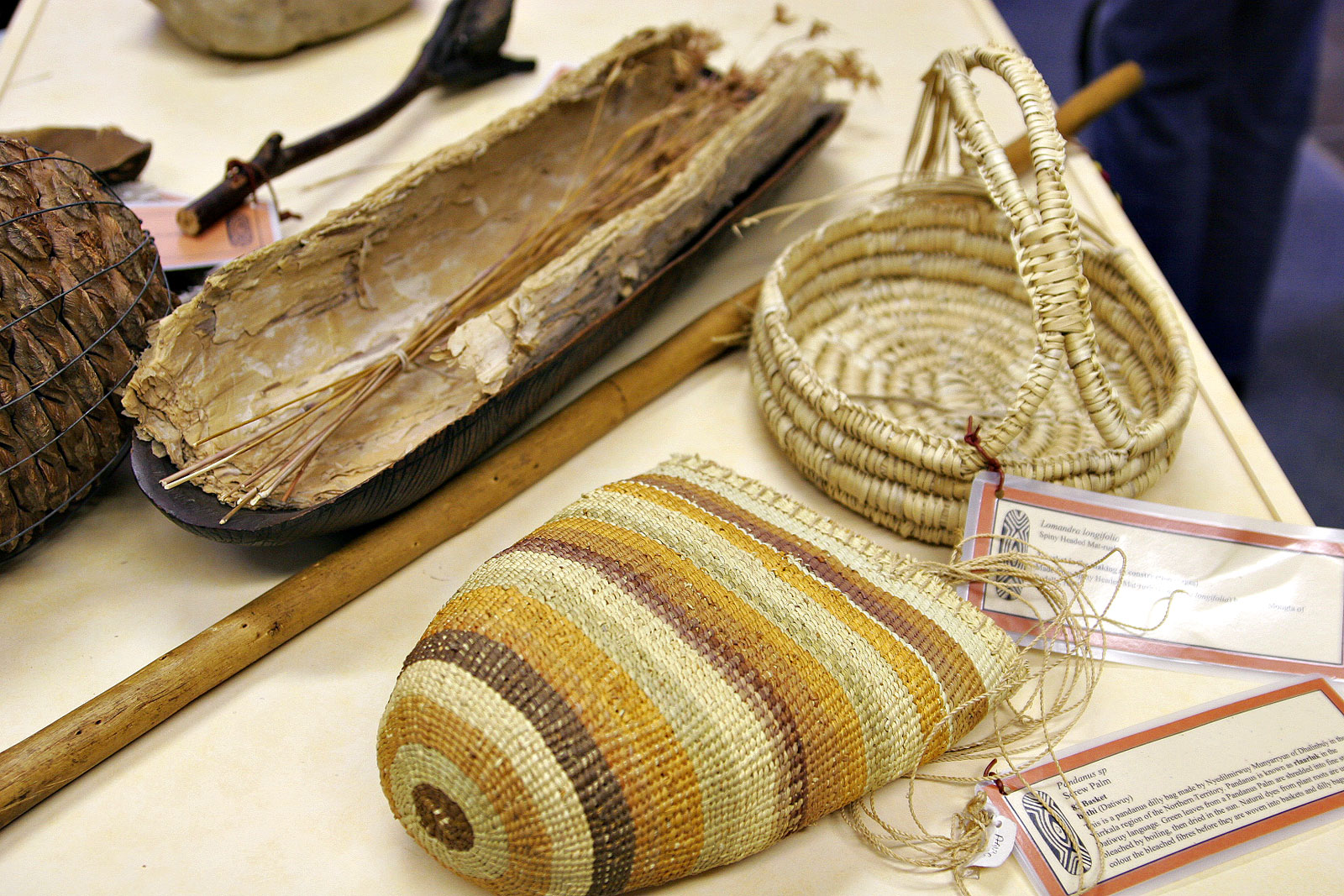
Baskets are often made from twisted bark fibres

Bark is used by many people across the continent. This technology is still used today to produce baskets, which are particularly popular in the tourism industry. Kurrajong bark is a popular bark, as is the bark of river wattles, sandpaper figs, banyans, burney vines and peanut trees.

In the north, the more tightly woven styles are made, whereas in the south, a looser stringed bag, popularly known as a dilly bag are made.

== Hair ==
Hairstring is an important textile traditionally made by Aboriginal Australians.

People, particularly women, would cut their hair regularly using quartz or flint knives. This hair is never wasted. It can be spun into long threads of yarn on a spindle rolled on the thigh and then plaited to about the thickness of 8 ply wool.

Purposes for the string are manifold. These include making the head ring for resting the coolamon, headbands to keep the hair off the face, spear-making (securing the head to the shaft), and even balls for ball games.

A general-purpose belt is made of the string, from which things could be hung, such as small game like goannas in order to free the hands on long walks and hunts.

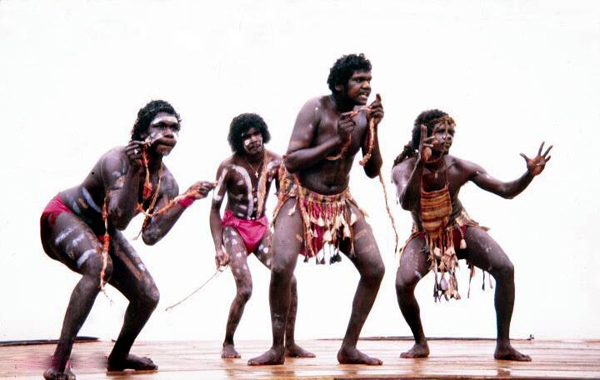
Aboriginal dancers wearing a more modern version of this covering, performing at Nambassa in New Zealand, 1981

Among some groups, including the Pitjantjajara, a small modesty apron was made of the string for young girls to wear when they reached puberty. People in Central Australia today may talk of a girl having her "string broken", which can mean sexual abuse, or having sex when she is not ready.

Among some tribes, adults wore a loincloth-like pubic covering, which also hung from the waist belt. This was made either of the string itself, or of other material, including paperbark. In the Kimberley region of Western Australia, the men wore pearl shells as a pubic covering, which they call Riji, and which are considered extremely sacred.

The string could be dyed various shades using dyes such as ochre.

Some string was only worn for ceremony, such as skirts worn by the women.

== String games ==
Cat's cradle

Many Aboriginal groups traditionally made many shapes out of the string (cat's cradle). A researcher once watched and photographed a young Aboriginal woman from Yirrkala make over 200 separate string figures. Each one involved complicated movements of her fingers and thumbs. She was able to remember the correct sequence of finger movements for nearly every figure she made, with only an occasional mistake which she quickly corrected. As she made each figure she gave it a name. Some examples included dangurang – a lobster, bapa – lightning, matjur – an ibis flying into a tree and gapu – the ripples on a pool.

The Bangarra Dance Theatre's 2005 production of CLAN incorporated traditional desert string games into one of their performances, creating intricate patterns as they thread themselves through long, elastic strings.

== Grasses ==
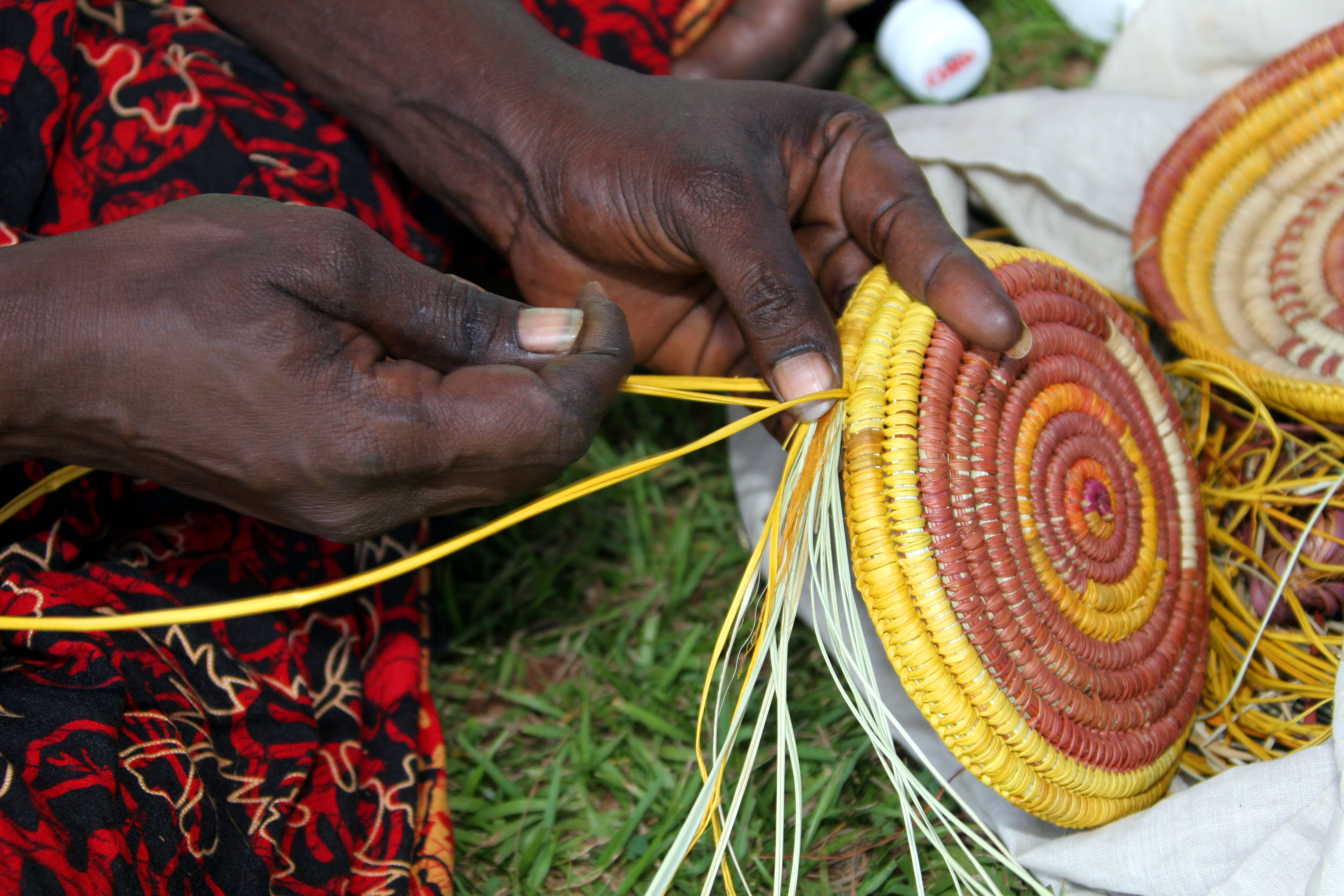
Christine Owney, a Jawoyn resident of the Manyallaluk/Eva Valley community, weaves a basket from pandanus.

Grasses are sometimes combined with hair to create a tougher fibre. Materials used differ depending on the area in Australia. In the arid areas, spinifex is common, whereas in the Top End, palms such as pandanus are often used.

Pandanus and sand-palm are used in areas such as the Daly River region and Arnhem Land to weave carry baskets, dilly string bags, wall hangings, fibre sculpture, floor mats and fish nets. The women of Peppimenarti and Gunbalanya are famous for such weaving: each community has their own distinct styles and techniques.

== See also ==
- Indigenous Australian art
- Australian Aboriginal culture
