= Nyigina language =

Nyulnyulan language spoken in Australia

Nyikina
- Region: Lower Fitzroy River, Western Australia
- Ethnicity: Nyigina
- Native speakers: 61 (2016 census)
- Language family: Nyulnyulan: Eastern; Nyikina
- Writing system: Latin

Language codes
- ISO 639-3: nyh
- Glottolog: nyig1240
- AIATSIS: K3
- ELP: Nyikina

Nyikina (also Nyigina, Njigina) is an Australian Aboriginal language of Western Australia, spoken by the Nyigina people.

Warrwa may have been a dialect.

== Classification ==
R. M. W. Dixon (2002) regards Nyikina, Warrwa, Yawuru and Jukun as a single language.

Nyikina is placed in the Nyulnyulan family of non-Pama–Nyungan languages.

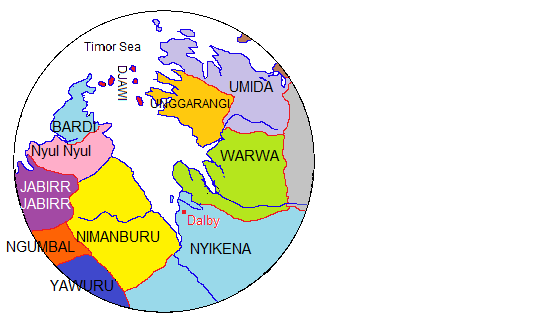
Traditional lands of Australian Aboriginal tribes around Derby, Western Australia

== Phonology ==
=== Consonants ===
	Peripheral		Laminal	Apical	
	Labial	Velar	Palatal	Alveolar	Retroflex
Plosive	b	ɡ	ɟ	d	ɖ
Nasal	m	ŋ	ɲ	n	ɳ
Lateral			ʎ	l	ɭ
Tap				ɾ	
Approximant	w		j		ɻ

- Sounds /ɟ, ɡ/, when following /l/ or in intervocalic positions, can be heard as [j, ɣ].
- /ɾ/ can also occasionally occur as a trill [r].

=== Vowels ===
	Front	Back
High	i	u
Low	a	

Phoneme	Allophones
/i/	[i], [ɪ]
/a/	[ä], [ɑ], [ʌ], [æ]
/u/	[u], [ʊ]

== See also ==
- Belinda Dann
- Loongkoonan
- Butcher Joe Nangan
