= Butcher Joe Nangan =

Aboriginal Australian lawman

'Butcher' Joe Nangan OAM
- Born: 1900; Kanen (Fisherman's Bend, Western Australia)
- Died: 1989 (aged 88–89); Broome
- Style: Pencil drawing, watercolour painting, pearl shell and boab nut incising
- Movement: Aboriginal Australian art
- Spouse(s): Josephine Balgalai (1937-1963), Therese Bende (1967-)
- Children: Mary Nangan
- Awards: Order of Australia Medal

Joe Nangan OAM (Butcher Joe Nangan) (1900-1989) was an Aboriginal Australian lawman, jalngunguru (healer or cleverman) and artist. In his role as a custodian of legends, Nangan was responsible for the preservation of the sounds and performances of ceremonial dance and songlines. As an artist, he created hundreds of pencil and watercolour drawings, as well as incised pearl shells and boab nuts, that convey powerful connections to his Country.

== Country, family and working life ==
Joe Nangan was possibly born on 25 February 1900 at Kanen (Fishermens Bend) in Western Australia. His Country extended east of Broome: from his Walmatjarri father (later known as Dicky Djulba), he held rights to an area called Paliara, near Christmas Creek station, and from his Nyikina mother (later known as Anne Binmaring), to an area called Jirkalli (or Jirrkaliy) on Dampier Downs station.

Nangan initially worked as a Stockman on pastoral stations before learning the trade of station butcher. In 1916, he was droving elsewhere when members of his family were killed in the Mowla Bluff Massacre. Nangan worked as a butcher at the Catholic mission at the Beagle Bay Community between 1920 and 1940 when he became known as Butcher Joe.

On 26 January 1937, he married Therese Bende in a Catholic ceremony and they had a daughter, Mary. Widowed in 1963, Nangan married Josephine Balgalai on 17 June 1967.

== Ceremonial responsibilities ==
Ethnomusicologist Alice Moyle has studied the nulu or nurlu form of the Kimberley people. The nulu is a dancing or corroboree song. It is primarily vocal and is accompanied with boomerang clapsticks. These songs are said to "found" in dreams and are communicated to those who "find" them by spirits.

Nangan's Nulu ganany (series of songs) includes references to his mother's death and the spirits near her grave. As early as the 1920s, the spirit of Nangan's aunt endowed him with the marinji-rinji nulu and Mayata, the pelican being. She showed him the pelican headdress depicted in Nangan's drawings. He wore the headdress in the Mayata nulu (dance of the pelican), which he performed in the Broome area from the 1920s until 1985.

Nangan's custodial responsibilities were broad. In addition to the territories he inherited from his mother and father, Nangan assumed responsibility for ensuring that law was also maintained in neighbouring territories as the populations dwindled through disease and massacre. This is evident in the breath of mythic content in Nangan's legacy. Many of the stories depicted are connected to the Jirkalli area on Dampier Downs station, but many others belong to or affect the Jukun, Yawuru and Karajarri people nearby.

== Works of art ==
It is estimated that Nangan made several thousand artworks in his life. These include incised pearl shells and boab nuts, as well as hundreds of pencil and watercolour drawings. Nangan's style was figurative, making use of his knowledge of anatomy, tonal modelling, perspective and shadows to depict figures in motion through space. Nangan's use of figuration for traditional subject matter, though, is unusual. Whilst secular themes are frequently realistically rendered, Aboriginal artists often choose to use more traditional styles for such content.

Nangan's drawings depict flora, fauna, spirit beings, mythological or historic events, but he rarely drew secular themes, almost exclusively depicting characters and narratives from the Dreaming. Nangan's depictions of traditional law and stories of his people are important records of Aboriginal life and legends. He recorded a vast amount of cultural knowledge, which he considered to be vital to an Aboriginal person's sense of identity, and was acutely aware of its rapid loss and the impact of this on individual wellbeing. He was also concerned that the loss would compromise the continuity of harmony between the natural and supernatural worlds.

Nangan was most prolific in the 1970s and 1980s, fulfilling commissions from Western Australian art dealer Mary Macha for three exhibitions held in between 1981 and 1983. His work is included in major Australian collections including the National Gallery of Australia (Canberra), the National Museum of Australia (Canberra), the Australian Institute of Aboriginal and Torres Strait Islander Studies (Canberra), the Art Gallery of Western Australia (Perth), the Berndt Museum of Anthropology (Perth) and Edith Cowan University (Perth) .

=== Incised pearl shells ===
Nangan was familiar with the Riji - the pearl shell and cloth ceremonial insignia traditionally worn by Aboriginal men from his Country. Riji influenced the incised pearl shells he created during the 1950s and 1960s, such as Pearl shell with a variety of Australian flora, fauna and figures including a winged female spirit.

=== Pencil and watercolour drawings ===
Nangan's determination to preserve and pass on his knowledge through his drawings resulted in approximately 600 being produced over three decades. The first of these were possibly produced through contact with anthropologist Helmut Petri who obtained some of Nangan's drawings in the mid-1950s and believed they were his first naturalistic works on paper.

Nangan mostly used a soft lead pencil to outline and shade the characters and landforms depicted, reserving bright colour and washes to highlight important features such as body decoration, weaponry and vegetation. The characters are human or animal, although both can possess powers of transmutation. Rocks, trees and other natural features are also coloured as they, too, are central to the events depicted.

Nangan was known to have produced many iterations of the same drawing. In some margins, he would draw a tiny insect or animal which was a mnemonic device for him to recall the key themes in the work. However, when Nangan's works were prepared for sale, the pages of the sketchbooks were often separated and the margins cut off, severing a vital link between a drawing and any transcribed explanation.

Examples of Nangan's pencil and watercolour drawings are:

- Nyinerri - The Law Leader (National Gallery of Australia)
- Sketchbook of drawings of the Nyikina people (National Museum of Australia)
- Parrbul (The sea woman) (The Art Gallery of Western Australia)

== Publications ==
Although unable to read or write English, Nangan's stories are published in two books. Joe Nangan’s Dreaming (1976) is co-authored by Nangan and Hugh Edwards, as is the story of Bera, the Sun Maidens which was included in a volume of short stories called Daughters of the Sun (1994).

== Order of Australia ==
Nangan was awarded a Medal of the Order of Australia in June 1987 for service to the arts and to Aboriginal heritage.

== Death ==
Butcher Joe Nangan died on 21 January 1989 in Broome where he was buried.
