= Warrwa language =

Extinct Australian Aboriginal language

Warrwa
- Pronunciation: [ˈwaɾwə]
- Native to: Australia
- Region: West Kimberley, Derby region of Western Australia
- Extinct: 2016, with the death of Maudie Lennard
- Language family: Nyulnyulan: Eastern; Nyigina?; Warrwa

Language codes
- ISO 639-3: wwr
- Glottolog: warr1258
- AIATSIS: K10
- ELP: Warrwa
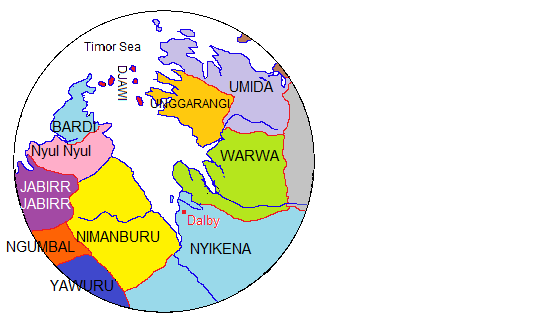
- Map of the traditional lands of Australian Aboriginal tribes around Derby, Western Australia. Warrwa is in green. (Note: map is indicative only.)

The Warrwa language (Aboriginal pronunciation: [ˈwaɾwə]) is an extinct Australian Aboriginal language of the Nyulnyulan language family which was formerly spoken in the Derby Region of Western Australia near Broome, Western Australia. It may have been a dialect of Nyigina. It was also known as Warrawai or Warwa.

== Classification ==
Warrwa is a member of the Nyulnyulan languages, a small, non-Pama-Nyungan language family encompassing around ten varieties with names. No Nyulnyulan language is learned by children, and many of them have already gone extinct. Its closest relative within the family is Nyigina. Possibly, these languages were mutually intelligible, as they share many morphemes,, and their phonologies and grammars are similar. However, they are considered distinct languages sociolinguistically, spoken in different areas and by different political units.

== Geographical distribution ==
Traditionally, Warrwa was spoken on the east coast of King Sound near Derby, Western Australia in the western Kimberley region. The precise boundaries of Warrwa territory are uncertain and disagreed upon between sources. Arthur Capell put Warrwa country north of the mouth of the Fitzroy River to south of around Cone Bay, encompassing the entire eastern side of King Sound. Norman Tindale mapped Warrwa territory south of around Oobagooma and the mouth of the Robinson River, extending inland for around 50 kilometers, then extending southwest to the Fitzroy near Yeeda Station.

== Phonology ==
=== Consonants ===
	Labial	Alveolar	Retroflex	Palatal	Velar
Plosive	b	d	ɖ ⟨rd⟩	ɟ ⟨j⟩	k
Nasal	m	n	ɳ ⟨rn⟩	ɲ ⟨ny⟩	ŋ ⟨ng⟩
Lateral		l	ɭ ⟨rl⟩	ʎ ⟨ly⟩	
Tap		ɾ ⟨rr⟩			
Approximant	w		ɻ ⟨r⟩	j	

- /k/ may also be heard as voiced [ɡ].

=== Vowels ===
	Front	Back
High	i	u
Low	a	

- Vowel length is also contrastive.
- /i, u/ can have allophones of [e, o].

== Grammar ==
Warrwa employed a variety of word orders grammatically. Attributive adjectives and possessive adjectives preceded the nouns they modified.
