= Loongkoonan =

Australian artist (c. 1910–2018)

- Born: c. 1910; Kimberley, Western Australia, Australia
- Died: 2018
- Known for: Painting

Daisy Loongkoonan (c. 1910 – 2018) was an Australian Aboriginal artist and elder from the Nyikina people of the central western Kimberley region in Western Australia. Loongkoonan was born at Mount Anderson near the Fitzroy River. Her parents worked on cattle stations, and as she grew up, Loongkoonan followed them, mustering sheep and cooking in stock camps. Later she rode horses and mustered cattle.

During the wet season, Loongkoonan would follow her people to their traditional lands, where they would undergo ceremonies and collect bush foods, medicines, and the prized "limmiri" (spinifex wax). Loongkoonan used this time to go footwalking around the 133,000 hectares of land. She believed that "Footwalking is the proper [only] way to learn about country and remember it.”

In 2005 Loongkoonan began painting through the arts workshop Manambarra Aboriginal Artists in Derby, Western Australia. Her shimmering depictions of bush tucker received immediate acclaim, being exhibited in every state and territory of Australia. Her work has been influential in inspiring a new generation of Nyikina artists, including Peggy Wassi. Loongkoonan died in 2018.

== Painting style ==
Loongkoonan had a unique pointillist painting style. When she first picked up her paint brush in 2004 at age 94, Loongkoonan "hadn’t quite worked out how to apply paint to the canvas...but within about 12 months she had refined her technique and developed her mature style."

The paintings were considered very beautiful and were "built up through mesmeric grids of vibrating dots and splayed lines, where intense color contrasts are studded and overlaid with iconic figurative elements: bush tucker of all sorts, tools for food gathering, and the ever present Mardoowarra".

== Recognition ==
In 2006, Loongkoonan was awarded first prize in the Redlands Art Award, and in 2007 she was awarded the Indigenous award at the Drawing Together Art Awards at the National Archives of Australia.

In 2016, Loongkoonan was given a solo retrospective exhibition in the United States. The exhibition Yimardoowarra: Artist of the River was exhibited at the Australian Embassy in Washington, DC, before traveling to the Kluge-Ruhe Aboriginal Art Collection at the University of Virginia. At the same time, her work was included prominently in the 2016 Adelaide Biennial at the Art Gallery of South Australia.

== Art collections ==
Her works are held in the collections of Australian Parliament House, Art Gallery of Western Australia, the Berndt Museum of Anthropology at the University of Western Australia, Macquarie University, and the Department of Indigenous Affairs in Canberra.

== Sources ==
- Alan McCulloch, Susan McCulloch and Emily McCulloch Childs, The New McCulloch’s Encyclopedia of Australian Art (Fourth Edition), Miegunyah Press, 2006, pp. 82–3
- Ric Spencer, ‘Let Your Eyes Be Lulled’, The West Australian “Weekend Extra”, 21 October 2006, p. 13.
- Seva Frangos, ‘Insite into Art’ Insite Magazine, Perth, Spring 2006
- Henry F. Skerritt, ‘New Energy in the Kimberley: Mananambarra Aboriginal Arts’, Artlink, vol.26, no.3, September 2006, pp. 68–69
- ‘Art of Wisdom’, Western Suburbs Weekly, Perth, 22 August 2006
- The Sunshine Coast Art Prize ’06, exhib. cat., Caloundra Regional Art Gallery, Caloundra, 2006
- ‘Paintings Speak the Kimberley History’, The Koori Mail, Lismore, 21 June 2006, p. 42
- ‘Wise Women Birrajakoo’, National Indigenous Times, vol.5, issue 107, Thursday 15 June 2006, pp. 25–26
- Clem Bastow, ‘Wise Women’, Inpress Magazine, Melbourne, Issue 909, Wednesday 22 March 2006
- Derek Tipper, ‘Kimberley Art in Melbourne’, The Koori Mail, Lismore, New South Wales, 29 March 2006
- Henry Skerritt, Ngarranggarni Mananambarra: Loongkoonan and Lucy Ward, exhib. cat., Indigenart, The Mossenson Galleries, Carlton, 2006
- ‘New Career for Old Station Hands’, The Post, Subiaco, Western Australia, 18 June 2005
- ‘The Vision: A National Museum of Indigenous Art’, Uniview, University of Western Australia, Vol. 23, no.3, Spring 2005
- "Bankwest Contemporary Art Prize's new Place to call home" (Press release). Bankwest. 2 October 2012.
- Hills, Ben. “Who's Driving Miss Daisy?” SBS, Special Broadcasting Service, www.sbs.com.au/topics/voices/culture/feature/whos-driving-miss-daisy.
- “Loongkoonan.” Loongkoonan-AGSA, Art Gallery of Southern Australia, 2016, www.agsa.sa.gov.au/whats-on/exhibitions/2016-adelaide-biennial-australian-art-magic-object/loongkoonan/.
