= Maban =

Maban, mabain or mabanba is a material that is held to be magical in some Australian Aboriginal mythology. It is the material from which the shamans and elders of Indigenous Australia supposedly derive their magical powers.

Among the Ngaanyatjarra people, practitioners are known as maparn or maparnjarra.

Maban has sometimes been identified with quartz.
