= Liveringa =

Pastoral lease in Western Australia

Coordinates: 18.049°S 124.172°E

Location in Western Australia

Liveringa or Liveringa Station, often referred to as Upper Liveringa Station, is a pastoral lease in Western Australia that once operated as a sheep station but presently operates as a cattle station.

== Description ==
Situated about 5 kilometres (3 mi) south east of the Looma Community and about 100 kilometres (62 mi) south east of Derby in the Kimberley region, the property has a 100-kilometre (62 mi) frontage on the Fitzroy River, which forms its southern boundary.

Comprising an area of 2,650 square kilometres (1,023 sq mi), it has a carrying capacity of over 22,000 head of cattle. The livestock manager since 2010 has been Peter "Jed" O'Brien, but the property also grows fodder for livestock using three centre-pivot irrigators and is experimenting with tropical grain crops.

The station contains large areas of river flats that are quite fertile and grow a variety of herbage suitable for fodder, including Mitchell grass, Flinders grass, rice grass, ribbon grass and bundle bundle. The growth is so prolific that the areas have been cut and baled as a reserve for the dry season.

The homestead group consists of the main house, workers' kitchen and dining room, meat house, shearers' quarters, workshop and the garden. The main house has stone walls with cement mortar and corrugated iron roofing. The surrounding verandah has steel supports and unlined timber purloins. It was built in the 1880s and 1890s and was classified by the National Trust in 2005.

== History ==
The Kimberley Pastoral Company was formed in 1881 and won the lottery to acquire the leasehold for the area of land. The syndicate consisted of William Marmion, M. C. Davies, brothers George and William Silas Pearse, and Robert Frederick Sholl, with brothers William and John McLarty as minor shareholders. The vessel Amur was chartered to take A. Cornish and the McLarty brothers along with sheep, horses, cattle and provisions from Fremantle to King Sound. Upon landing, the stock were driven to Yeeda Creek for fresh water before continuing inland to set up camp at Liveringa. The first homestead, shearing shed, woolshed and storeroom were constructed between 1886 and 1888. The homestead and outbuildings were constructed under the supervision of John McLarty the inaugural manager of the property. The buildings were situated on a knoll with a view over a billabong and the Fitzroy River. The original homestead was made of bush timbers and corrugated iron and was demolished in 1908 by the third manager of Liveringa, Percy Rose, who was building a new one. The new homestead was constructed of local sandstone.

While at Liveringa Rose fathered a child, Yoolya, with Wadadarl (also known as Brumby) around the time of his first arrival. Likely seeing this as a threat to his position as not only the manager, but also as an honouary protector of Aborigines and Justice of the peace, he paid the station overseer Walter Fraser £500 to be the guardian of him.

In 1911 the station was carrying a flock of 98,000 sheep and yielded a clip of 1419 bales of wool.

The property and surrounding areas were severely flooded in 1914, and again in 1938 resulting in the death of a former jockey, William Skinner, who drowned in the flooded Nerrima River.

Kim Rose, the nephew of Percy Rose, was appointed manager at Liveringa in 1930; Rose was a director of the Kimberley Pastoral company that owned the property. Later the same year, a freak deluge of rain left 210,000 acres (850 km^{2}) of land underwater and 30,000 sheep drowned before they could reach higher ground. In 1940, during his management he asked Yoolya to return and made him head stockman. He remained in this role until the early 1960s when an injury to his arm meant that he could no longer undertake the work of a stockman.

In 1949 the property occupied 700,000 acres (2,833 km^{2}) and the station recorded over 14 inches (356 mm) of rain in a week, resulting in more stock losses. It had 800 miles (1,287 km) of fencing dividing the property into 60 paddocks. For the previous few years an average of 57,000 sheep had been shorn each year.

The area was struck by drought between 1951 and 1953 with the number of cattle being reduced by half. This was the first drought suffered by pastoralists in 70 years, with many hurriedly sinking bores and buying feed to keep their stock alive. Other nearby properties that were affected were Noonkanbah, Cherrabun, Quandan, Gogo, Glenroy, Fossil Downs, Luilugui, Christmas Creek and Bohemia Downs Station.

The Australian Land and Cattle Company was incorporated in 1969 in Western Australia by Jack Miller Fletcher and Corey Crutcher. At its height, the company owned seven prime Kimberley stations covering nearly 20,000 square kilometres (7,722 sq mi) and carrying 100,000 head of cattle. Among the properties acquired were Camballin and Liveringa stations. At Liveringa the company cleared 25,000 hectares (61,776 acres) of land to grow sorghum under flood irrigation; the crop was then used in company feedlots to fatten cattle. In 1972 the last of the sheep were sold off to stations in the Pilbara and the only stock remaining were cattle. The Australian Land and Cattle Company collapsed in the 1980s.

In 1973, a 6,000-hectare (14,826-acre) portion of the property to the west of the homestead was excised and reserved for the Looma Community.

In 2002 the property commenced the process of gradually changing the genetic base of the herd by introducing a crossbreeding program to produce red lines suitable for live export or sale into southern markets. Red brangus bulls were introduced over the Brahman-based herd at another property, Nerrima, and the heifers produced taken to Liveringa.

Gina Rinehart acquired a 50% stake in both Liveringa and neighbouring Nerrima Station in 2014. Rinehart teamed up with agribusiness group Milne Agrigroup who already owned the properties. Liveringa was stocked with approximately 22,000 head of cattle. The half share was acquired for A$40 million.

== See also ==
- List of ranches and stations
- List of pastoral leases in Western Australia
