= Looma Community, Western Australia =

Community in Western Australia

Looma
- Interactive map of Looma
- Coordinates: 18.039138°S 124.149356°E
- Country: Australia
- State: Western Australia
- LGA: Shire of Derby-West Kimberley
- Location: 120 km (75 mi) from Derby
- Established: 1900s

Government
  - State electorate: Kimberley
  - Federal division: Durack

Population
  - Total: 412 (UCL 2021); 397 (ILOC 2021)
- Postcode: 6728

Looma is an Aboriginal community about 120 km south-east of Derby adjacent the Fitzroy River in the Kimberley region of Western Australia. At the 2011 census, Looma had a population of 374.

== History ==
The Looma Aboriginal community was originally built as accommodation for the Aboriginal stockmen and their families who worked on the Camballin and Liveringa Stations during the late 1950s and 1960s. It was one of the first communities of its kind in Australia. A second community, "New Looma", was built approximately 2 km south, after splinter groups within the community had to move due to infighting. Consequently, a new community was formed with new roads, housing and water supply installed. The old community remained as is.

== Education ==
Looma Remote Community School is serviced by a district high school and also has access to TAFE short courses.

== Facilities ==
=== Electricity supply ===
Electricity is fed via a feeder from the nearby Camballin power station.

Looma also has its own power station, located approximately 5 kilometres south of Looma.

=== Water ===
Old Looma has two bores feeding into a high level tank. New Looma has the same arrangement with more modern infrastructure.

=== Sewerage ===
Old Looma has a sewerage pump station and ponds. New Looma pipes its waste to the Old Looma ponds.

=== Recreation ===
The community has basketball courts and a football oval. Looma fields a team in the West Kimberley Football Association called the "Looma Eagles".

Bush walking, some fishing and camping are the dominant pursuits for tourists visiting. Visitors are required to apply for a permit prior to entering the Community.

=== Health ===
Looma has a community nursing post.

=== Town planning ===
Looma Layout Plan No.2 was prepared in accordance with State Planning Policy 3.2 Aboriginal Settlements and was endorsed by the community in 2007 and the Western Australian Planning Commission in 2008. The layout plan map-set and background report can be viewed at the Department of Planning Lands and Heritage web site.

=== Other ===
Looma is equipped with a community radio station: Looma BRACS, 106.1 MHz (FM band), part of the Pilbara and Kimberley Aboriginal Media (PAKAM) network.
