= Broome Regional Prison =

Prison in Western Australia

Coordinates: 17°57′29″S 122°14′28″E

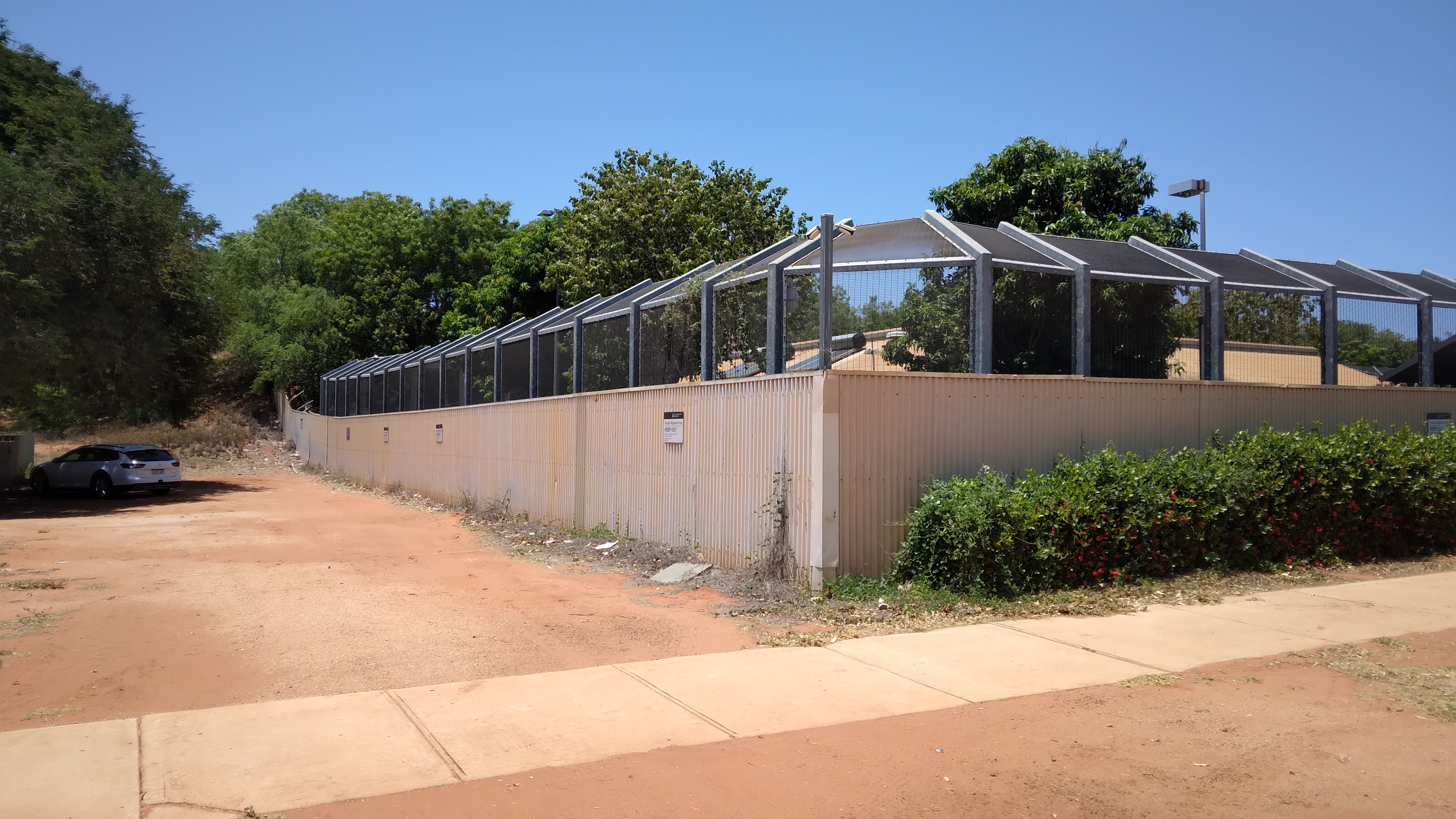
- The prison in 2024
- Interactive map of Broome Regional Prison
- Location: Broome, Western Australia
- Status: Operational
- Security class: Mixed (male/female)
- Capacity: 98 plus 40 at work camp
- Opened: 1894
- Managed by: Department of Justice, Western Australia

Broome Regional Prison is an Australian prison in Broome, Western Australia. It is one of two prisons in Western Australia's Kimberley region.

In 2012 it was announced that the prison would be closed in 2015 following the opening of the West Kimberley Regional Prison in Derby, but this plan was shelved in 2015.
