= Boab Prison Tree =

Boab Prison Tree can refer to two Boab trees in the Kimberley, Western Australia, that are known as "Prison Trees":-

- Boab Prison Tree, Derby
- Boab Prison Tree, Wyndham
