= Pseudofusicoccum ardesiacum =

Scientific classification
- Kingdom: Fungi
- Division: Ascomycota
- Class: Dothideomycetes
- Order: Botryosphaeriales
- Family: Phyllostictaceae
- Genus: Pseudofusicoccum
- Species: P. ardesiacum

Binomial name
- Pseudofusicoccum ardesiacum Pavlic et al., 2008

Species of fungus

Pseudofusicoccum ardesiacum is an endophytic fungus that might be a canker pathogen, specifically for Adansonia gibbosa (baobab). It was isolated from said trees, as well as surrounding ones, in the Kimberley (Western Australia).
