= William Shippen =

William Shippen may refer to:

- William Shippen (MP) (1673–1743), English Member of Parliament
- William Shippen Sr. (1712–1801), American physician
- William Shippen Jr. (1738–1808), his son, American physician
- William Castlebury Shippen (1829–1911), American politician in Iowa
