= Aedes pecuniosus =

Scientific classification
- Kingdom: Animalia
- Phylum: Arthropoda
- Class: Insecta
- Order: Diptera
- Family: Culicidae
- Genus: Aedes
- Species: A. pecuniosus

Binomial name
- Aedes pecuniosus Edwards, 1922

Species of mosquito

Aedes (Molpemyia) pecuniosus is a species of mosquito in the genus Aedes. It is found around Port Darwin, the Northern Territory, and South Australia.

It is known to breed in rot holes of trees, especially the boab, and prey on other species of mosquito. In the laboratory females are known to bite man, but not in the wild.
