= List of hanging trees =

Trees used to perform execution by hanging

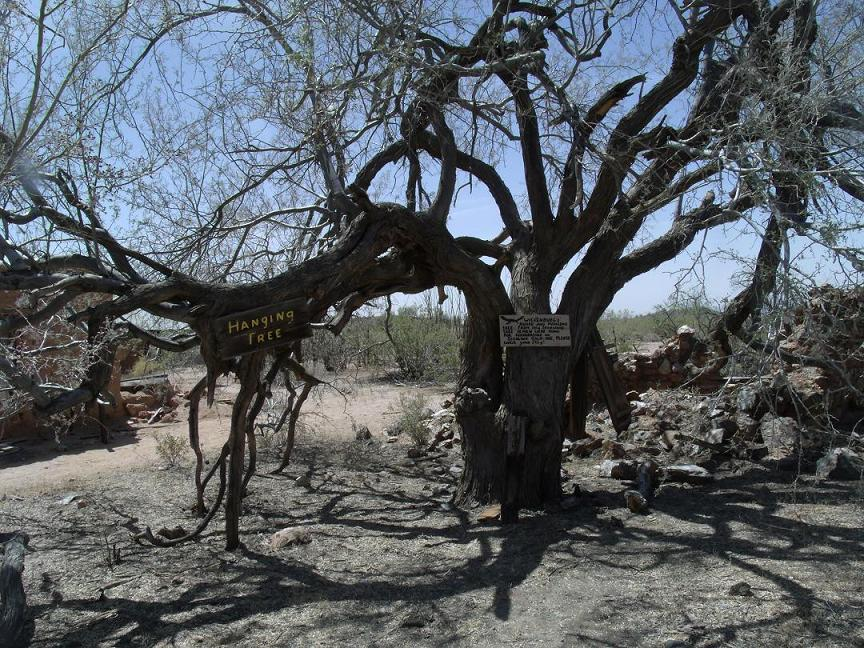
The Hanging Tree in Vulture City, Arizona

A hanging tree or hangman's tree is any tree used to perform executions by hanging, especially in the United States. The term is also used colloquially in all English-speaking countries to refer to any gallows.

== Hanging trees in the United States by state ==
Arizona

- Greaterville Hanging Tree: An oak tree outside of the ghost town Greaterville, Arizona, it is where Pima County police officers lynched two Mexican men for alleged cattle rustling and other crimes in 1915. It is located along a dirt road in the northern Santa Rita Mountains, near the historic Greaterville townsite.
- Vulture City Hanging Tree: An ironwood tree, it is located in the ghost town of Vulture City, Arizona, next to the remains of Henry Wickenburg's stone cabin built circa 1863. Eighteen men were hanged from this tree in the late 19th century for "high grading" (stealing gold ore).

California

- Calabasas Hanging Tree: An oak tree once located next to a small jail building in Old Town Calabasas, California, it died in the 1960s and was felled by a storm in 1995. A second tree that still stands in Calabasas is also rumored to have been used for hangings, though debate exists as to which tree was the real hanging tree.
- Hangman's Tree: A juniper tree in Holcomb Valley, California, it was used in the legal executions of at least four condemned men in the late 19th century.
- Hangman's Tree: A sycamore tree, it is located on the Irvine Ranch in Orange County, California. In 1857, General Andres Pico hanged two bandits from this tree. A historical marker now commemorates the event.
- "Hangmans" Tree: An oak tree, now dead, was in the ghost town of Second Garrotte, California, which was first settled in 1849. As many as 60 people were hanged from this tree. The remaining tree stump is now preserved and is located on State Highway 120.
- Jackson Hanging Tree: A live oak tree, it once stood at 26 Main in Jackson, California, before being cut down following 1862 Jackson fire. Ten men were lynched from this tree between 1851 and 1855. A historical marker now marks its original location.
- New Almaden Hanging Tree: An oak tree, it was located at the New Almaden Mine site in San Jose, California.

Colorado

- The Hangin' Tree: Located in Montrose, Colorado, and used in the 1878 hanging of George Bikford, who was accused of robbery and horse theft. The tree, now dead, has been preserved and a historical marker has been placed at its location.
- Pueblo Hanging Tree: Formerly located on Union Avenue in Pueblo, Colorado. Felled June 25, 1883.

Georgia

- Savannah Hanging Tree: Live oak located in Colonial Park Cemetery in Savannah, Georgia.

Kansas

- Hangman's Tree: Located in the Boot Hill Cemetery in Dodge City, Kansas.

Massachusetts

- Gallows Hill: A large tree once located at Proctor's Ledge, near the base of Gallows Hill in Salem, Massachusetts, was probably the site of 19 executions in the 1692 Salem witch trials

Montana

- Hangman's Tree: Ponderosa pine tree once located in Helena, Montana. Ten men were lynched from this tree between 1865 and 1870 by the Helena Vigilantes. Felled by landowner, Methodist minister William Castlebury Shippen, in 1875. Two pieces of the tree now reside in the collection of the Montana Historical Society in Helena.
- Jefferson County Hanging Tree: Ponderosa pine tree allegedly used for hangings in the territorial period of the state's history. Located near Clancy, in Jefferson County, Montana.

New Mexico

- Chloride Hanging Tree: Large oak tree in the ghost town of Chloride, New Mexico.

New York

- Patchogue Hanging Tree: Located along the Swan River on Grove Street in Patchogue, New York.

Oklahoma

- Creek Hanging Tree: A 200-year-old bur oak used for the hanging of cattle rustlers and Creek tribesmen. Located on Lawton Avenue in Tulsa, Oklahoma.

Oregon

- Dallas Hanging Tree: Oak tree used in the 1887 lynching of Oscar Kelty, who murdered his wife, and as recently as 1900 for legal hangings as Polk County, Oregon's official gallows. Located near the Polk County Courthouse in Dallas, Oregon.
- Lafayette Hanging Tree: First used in 1863 and finally in 1887, when convicted murderer Richard Marple was hanged in what became known as "The Lafayette Gypsy Curse" incident. Formerly located on private property in Lafayette, Oregon; cut down by property owners in the 1940s.
- Salem Hanging Tree: Located in Salem, Oregon.

South Carolina

- Charleston Hanging Tree: Located in Charleston, South Carolina, and reputed to be the site where Denmark Vesey and 34 of his followers were hanged in 1822.

South Dakota

- Hangman's Tree: Located on a ridge, formerly known as Hangman's Hill, in Dinosaur Park in Rapid City, South Dakota.

Texas

- Bandera Hanging Tree: Located on the Hanging Tree Ranch south of Bandera, Texas. On July 25, 1863, Confederate soldiers on patrol from nearby Camp Verde detained and summarily executed a group of eight men passing through the area. The fate of a teenage boy accompanying the group remains unknown. The first 3 men listed on the headstone (Sawyer) were on military leave from the Confederate army. The group of men were headed to Mexico with $1,000 to buy livestock at the border before returning home to Georgetown, Texas. Since the men were heavily armed, well provisioned, and had almost $1,000 in cash among them remains undisputed. The group surrendered their weapons and agreed to accompany the patrol back to Camp Verde to resolve the issue. While en route to Camp Verde, some soldiers decided to execute the immigrant group. Other soldiers objected, but when the major failed to take charge, the dissenters fled to report the planned executions. At daybreak, the patrol passed through the nearby town Bandera, Texas, with some soldiers wearing the victims' clothes and leading the victims' horses. Townsfolk discovered the victims' bodies naked and unburied near the oak tree. The victims' money was never recovered. The Major (Anderson) that was responsible for the murderous Confederate soldiers was tried (in absentia) in a U.S. court, found guilty, and sentenced to death. Major Anderson was never found, in order to carry out his sentence.
- Brazoria Hanging Tree: Located in Brazoria, Texas. Known as the Masonic Oak for the formation of the first Texas Masonic Lodge by early Texans (including Anson Jones, future third Republic of Texas President) who met under its branches in 1834, it is preserved and located in a park of the same name. Urban legend has it that from this same tree "two slaves were unjustly hanged" and their ghosts now haunt the area, causing horses to freeze under the tree and cars to stall. However, no details, evidence, or source material to confirm this internet claim can be found. The Brazoria area, which contains low moss-laden oaks, dense marshy woods and much wildlife along the river bottom, is the subject of many such fantastic horror tales, including other hangings of "unidentified" people, screams from the woods in the night, and devil worship.
- Centerville Hanging Tree: Formerly located in front of the courthouse in Centerville, Texas. Used to hang two outlaws shortly after the end of the American Civil War and later in 1915 to hang a black man accused of murdering Centerville resident Jim Sinclair.
- Coldspring Hanging Tree: Oak tree in Coldspring, Texas, near the historic San Jacinto County jail building.
- Columbus Hanging Tree: Live oak located just outside Columbus, Texas. Long after Texas enacted laws banning the act, two African-American teenagers named Bennie Mitchell, Jr. and Ernest Collins were lynched from this tree in 1935, after being forcibly taken from the Sheriff's protective custody by a masked mob who surrounded his car as he transported the young men to court. The teens had confessed to raping and murdering a local 19-year-old high school valedictorian named Geraldine Kollman, but were too young to face any severe penalty under the law. The two teens had also implicated a third older man, who had earlier been questioned and released, but he could not be found again. The tree still stands on the outskirts of Columbus, Texas, not far from where Miss Kollman had been murdered near her family's home.
- Goliad Hanging Tree: Large oak tree in Goliad, Texas. For 24 years the Goliad County court was held under this tree. Many hangings were performed here, including several during the 1857 Cart War between American and Mexican settlers.
- Hallettsville Hanging Tree: Live oak tree located in the Hallettsville, Texas, city park. Used for the September 12, 1879, execution of a Native American man known as "Pocket," who was found guilty of murdering an Englishman named Leonard Hyde in 1878. After breaking into the family home of a former slave named Frank Edwards, Pocket. who was drunk, threatened to kill Edwards after Edwards had "knocked him down." Pocket then rode his horse on an attempt to procure weapons, a pistol and shotgun, the latter from a farmer whom Hyde happened to be assisting. Pocket claimed he needed the shotgun for hunting a flock of wild turkeys he had just spotted, but when Hyde attempted to accompany Pocket on the alleged hunt, Pocket killed him with the pistol.
- Kyle Hanging Tree: Oak tree in Kyle, Texas. According to local lore, in the 1840s a group of cowboys stumbled across this tree and found a dead man hanging from it. The cowboys cut the man down and buried him at the base of the tree. Later the Kyle Cemetery formed up around the tree.
- Orange Hanging Tree: Pin oak tree once located on Main Street in Orange, Texas. In use between the 1840s and 1880s. Cut down in 1892.
- Page's Tree: Used in the 1837 execution of a murderer named Page and two others. Located in the Clarksville, Texas, pioneer cemetery.
- The Old Hanging Oak: 400-year-old live oak tree in Houston, Texas. Said to have been used to hang eleven individuals between 1836 and 1845, and this or an unknown tree close to nearby Founder's Cemetery, several murderers after the Civil War. Now preserved by the City of Houston Civic Center Department.

== Gallery ==
The lynching of murderer James Daniels from the Hangman's Tree in Helena, Montana, in 1866.

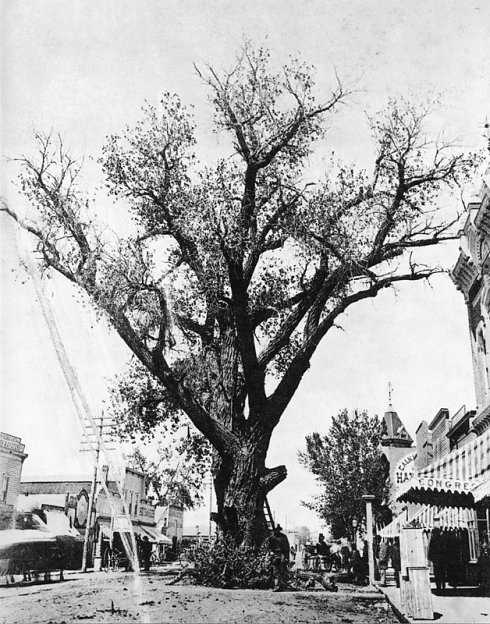
The Hanging Tree in Pueblo, Colorado, c.1880.

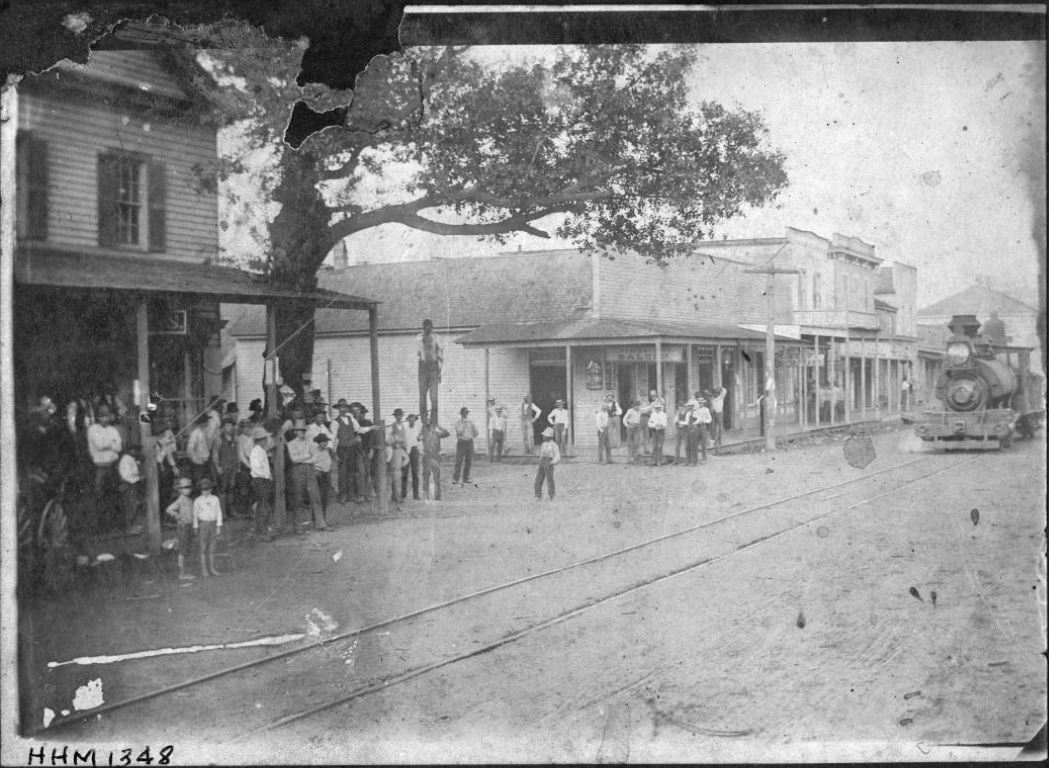
The lynching of a man from the Hanging Tree in Orange, Texas, in 1888.

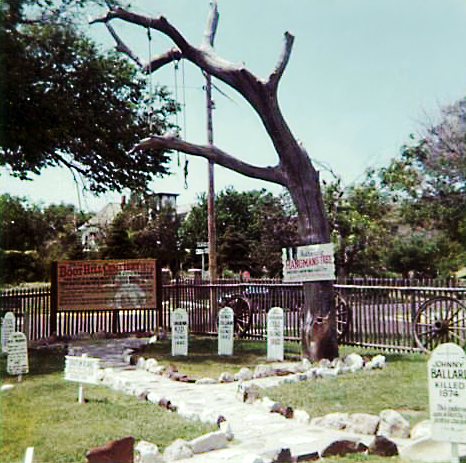
Hangman's Tree in Dodge City, Kansas.

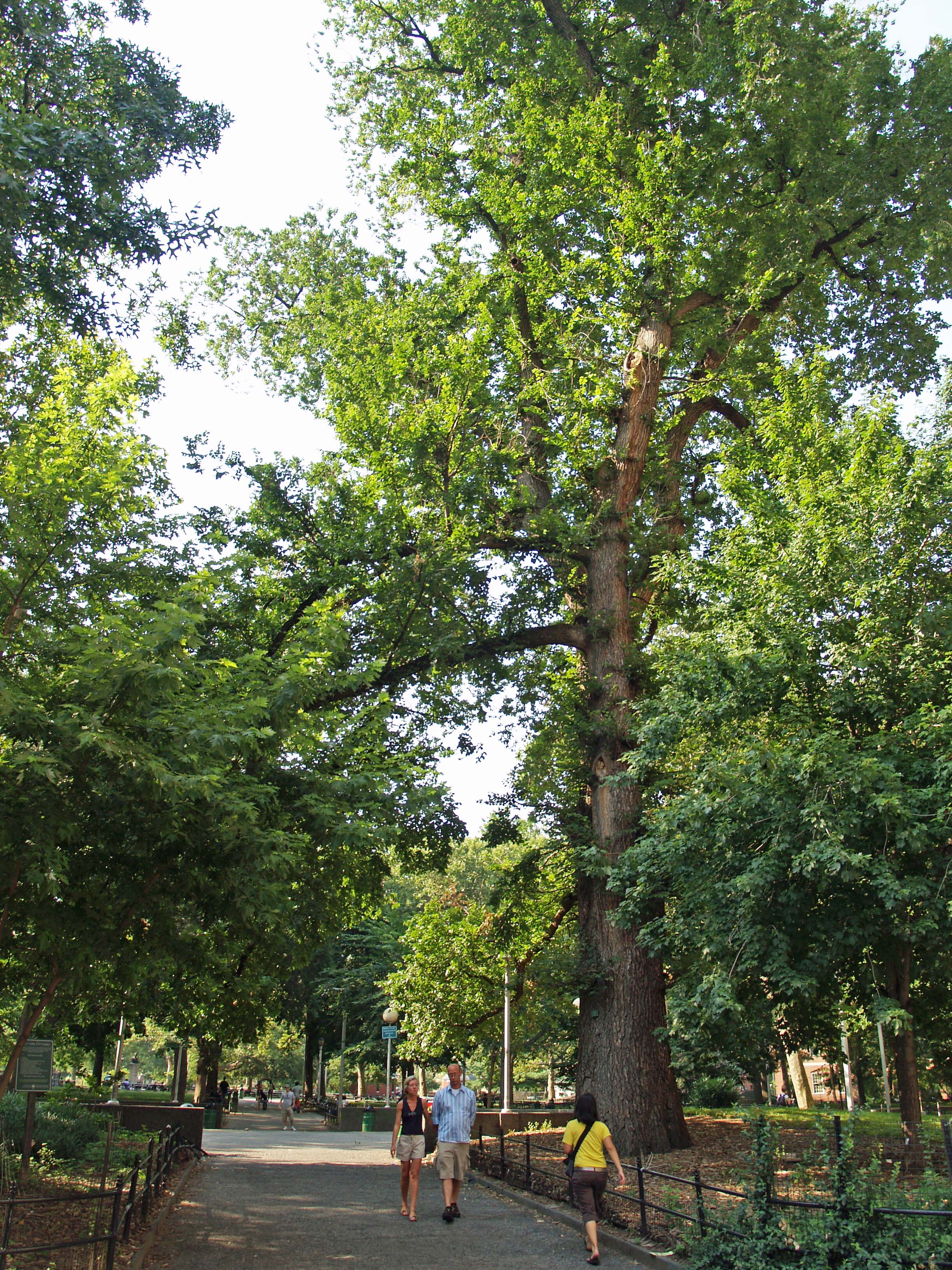
Hangman's Elm in Manhattan's Washington Square Park.

== See also ==
- Dule tree
- Jail tree
- Moonah Creek Hanging Tree
- List of individual trees
