= Gija Jumulu =

Boab tree moved 3200 km to Perth, Western Australia

Coordinates: 31.962224°S 115.841033°E

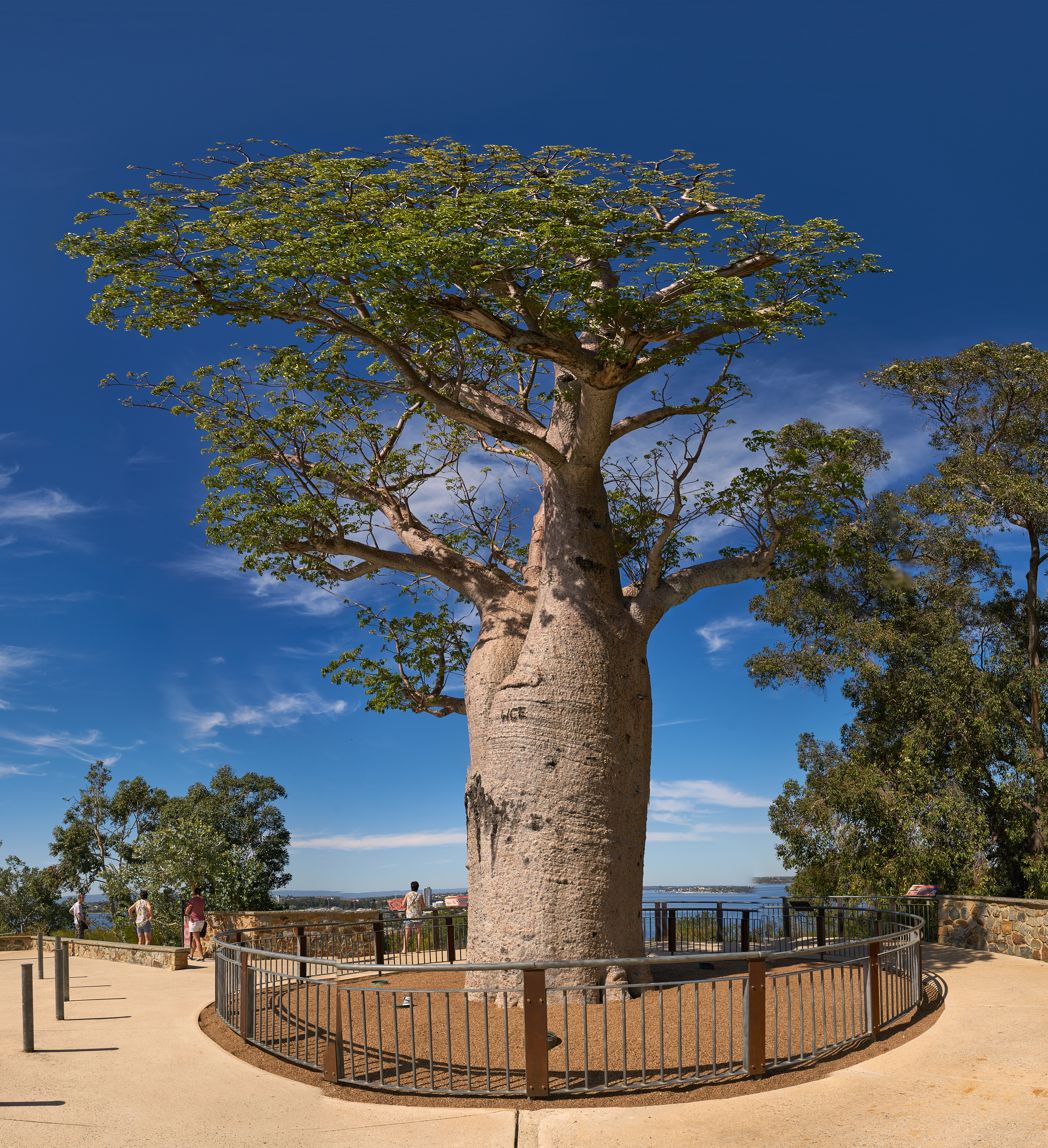
Gija Jumulu

Gija Jumulu is a boab tree (Adansonia gregorii) which was transported 3,200 kilometres (2,000 mi) from Telegraph Creek, near Warmun in the Kimberley region of Western Australia to Kings Park in Perth. This was the longest land journey of a similar sized tree in history.

The tree was removed to make way for the construction of a road bridge on Great Northern Highway and was replanted at the Two Rivers Lookout, at the end of Forrest Carpark in Kings Park on 20 July 2008.

The 36-tonne (79-thousand-pound) tree is estimated to be 750 years old and is named from the local indigenous people near Warmun, the Gija, and their word for boab trees, Jumulu. Boabs are believed to live up to 2,000 years.

The tree received some superficial damage on its southern side trunk during its journey south which resulted in some bark becoming rotten. Arborists at Kings Park removed the damaged material and expected the wounds to eventually disappear. In 2016 the tree was assessed as healthy.
