= Mary Gertrude =

Australian missionary, nurse and religious leader (1884–1965)

Mother Mary Gertrude
- Title: Provincial superior

Personal life
- Born: Anne Greene; 1884 Killard, Clare, Ireland
- Died: 20 February 1965 (aged 94) Broome, Western Australia, Australia
- Parent(s): Thomas and Bridget Greene
- Known for: establishing hospital for leprosy patients

Religious life
- Religion: Catholic
- Denomination: Roman Catholic
- Order: Sisters of St. John of God

Mary Gertrude MBE (born Anne Greene, 1884–1965), was an Australian nurse and provincial superior, and a member of the Sisters of St. John of God.

== Early life ==
Born in Killard, County Clare, Ireland, she settled in Australia around 1905.

== Vocation ==
She worked as a nurse in hospitals run by her order in Western Australia. In 1929, she began serving at the order's mission in north Western Australia, where she was influential in securing a hospital for Aboriginal Australian patients with leprosy. She cared for patients in the hospital for ten years.

Mother Mary Gertrude was appointed provincial superior of her order in the North-West in 1947, and served two six-year terms. She became a member of the Most Excellent Order of the British Empire in 1948. After her service as provincial superior, she was appointed superior of the Sisters of St. John of God convent in Derby.

== Death ==
She died as the result of a car accident in Broome, on 20 February 1965. She is buried in the Broome cemetery.
