= West Kimberley Regional Prison =

Prison in Western Australia

- Interactive map of West Kimberley Regional Prison
- Location: Derby, Western Australia; 17.353890°S 123.677194°E
- Status: Operational
- Security class: Medium and minimum (Male and female)
- Capacity: 150
- Opened: 1 August 2012
- Managed by: Department of Justice, Western Australia

West Kimberley Regional Prison is an Australian prison near Derby in the Kimberley region of north-western Western Australia. It was established in August 2012. The prison is designed to house 120 male and 30 female prisoners.

The prison consists of 42 buildings, including 22 self-care accommodation units for 11 prisoners each. Shared facilities include a gatehouse, kitchen and laundry building, prisoner service areas, family visiting area, educational buildings, cultural meeting areas, elders program areas, administration block, medical centre and courtroom. Access routes to shared facilities had been designed to eliminate any contact between female and male prisoners.

The prison development by TAG Architects & Iredale Pedersen Hook Architects had received the 2013 International Architecture Award and the Australian Institute of Architects 2013 National Architecture Awards for Sustainable Architecture.
