= William Castlebury Shippen =

American politician (1829–1911)

William Castlebury Shippen (21 December 1829 – 9 or 11 August 1911) was an American politician and Methodist minister.

A native of Ohio born on 21 December 1829, Shippen was a founding member of the Methodist Episcopal Church's Upper Iowa Conference in 1852. He served on the Iowa Senate between 1862 and 1868, as a Republican legislator for District 13, which included his home of Monroe County at the time. He moved to Helena, Montana in 1873, and became known there for chopping down the local hanging tree in 1875. Shippen subsequently moved to Butte for one year, and then to Oregon, where he died in 1911.
