= Boab Prison Tree, Wyndham =

Historic boab tree near Wyndham, Western Australia

Coordinates: 15.6305°S 128.095°E

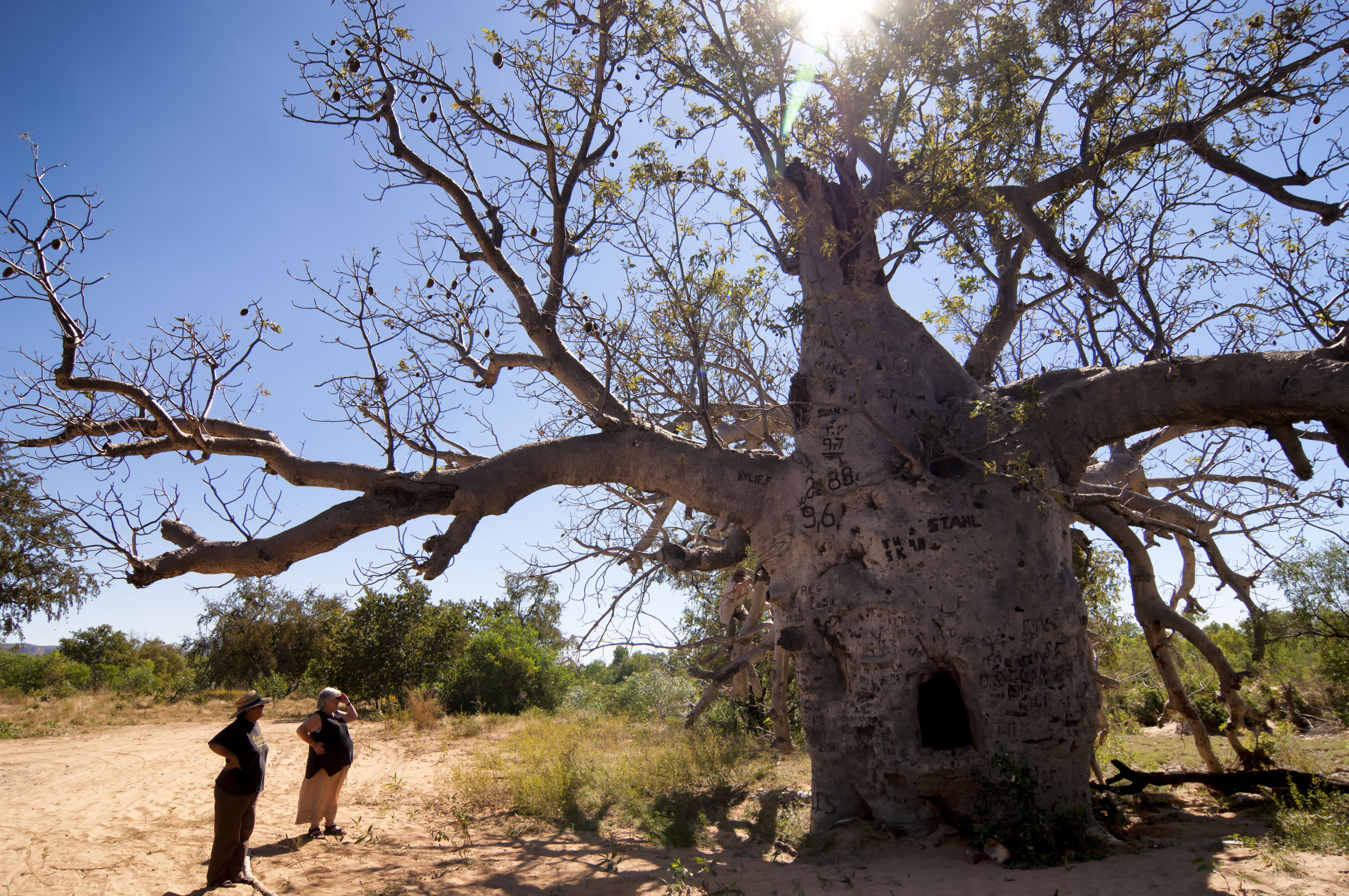
Some visitors looking at the Wyndham Prison Tree in 2006

The Boab Prison Tree is a large hollow Adansonia gregorii (boab) tree just south of Wyndham, Western Australia, near The Diggers Rest and the Moochalabra Dam (Wyndham's water supply), on the King River road. The tree was once known as the Hillgrove Lockup.

== Prison usage ==
Evidence indicates that police on patrol from Wyndham in the 1890s noticed that holes in the upper branches indicated that the tree was hollow and so cut an opening into the tree to use it as a lockup for Aboriginal prisoners on their way to Wyndham for sentencing, as this excerpt from a 1931 news article suggests.

The bottle tree known as Hillgrove lockup, situated on the King River 25 miles from Wyndham is a tree with a history. When blacks were bad, in the 'nineties, this tree was used as a prison. The holes in the limbs indicated that it was hollow, and the police cut out an opening and had a cell with a capacity of more than 100 square feet, where the natives were locked up at night.

The continuation of the 1931 article also states that it "has accommodated 30 prisoners at one time.", however this is likely to be an exaggeration.

Another 1940 news article states, probably more accurately, that when there was not enough room for all prisoners inside the tree, that they were chained to the outside of the tree. The article goes on to describe the escape of a prisoner who had been chained outside the tree.

Some years ago a trooper was bringing into Wyndham a party in chains when at dusk they arrived at the baob-tree. As there wasn't room inside for everybody the trooper chained two of the prisoners to the tree. One of the pair was a magnificent specimen of a man well over six feet high with well shaped arms and legs and a blacksmith's chest. At daybreak that native was missing and so was the chain. But an iron bolt to which the chain had been padlocked was left bent back in the form of a hairpin.

Another article from 1938 includes the circumference of the tree and that the name "Hillgrove Police Station" was inscribed on the tree.

A Tree Lock-up. Not far from the living quarters of the pumping station personnel is a baobab tree of more than ordinary interest. It is of enormous girth-nearly 40 feet in circumference at the butt-hollow, with a hole in the trunk about waist high from the ground. In the roaring days this was the lock-up of the Hillgrove Police Station; prisoners being put inside to await transport to their place of trial. The words "Hillgrove Police Station" are cut deeply into the soft bark of the tree, together with the names and initials of hundreds of travellers who had made this their bid for fame.

However a photograph at the State Library of South Australia taken c. 1917–1925 clearly shows the words "Hillgrove Lockup" cut into the trunk. With hundreds of new names and initials that have been cut into the boab since then and with time, this has almost completely disappeared and had become an almost forgotten name for the tree.

A 1966 news article states that the Boab Prison Tree, Derby had never been used as a prison, though confirms that the Boab Prison tree at Wyndham had been used.

The Hillgrove Lockup or Boab Prison Tree, Wyndham, appears to have been a tourist attraction since the early 1900s.

== See also ==
- Jail tree
- Boab Prison Tree, Derby
- List of individual trees
