= Boab Prison Tree, Derby =

Heritage listed tree in Western Australia

Baobab Prison Tree
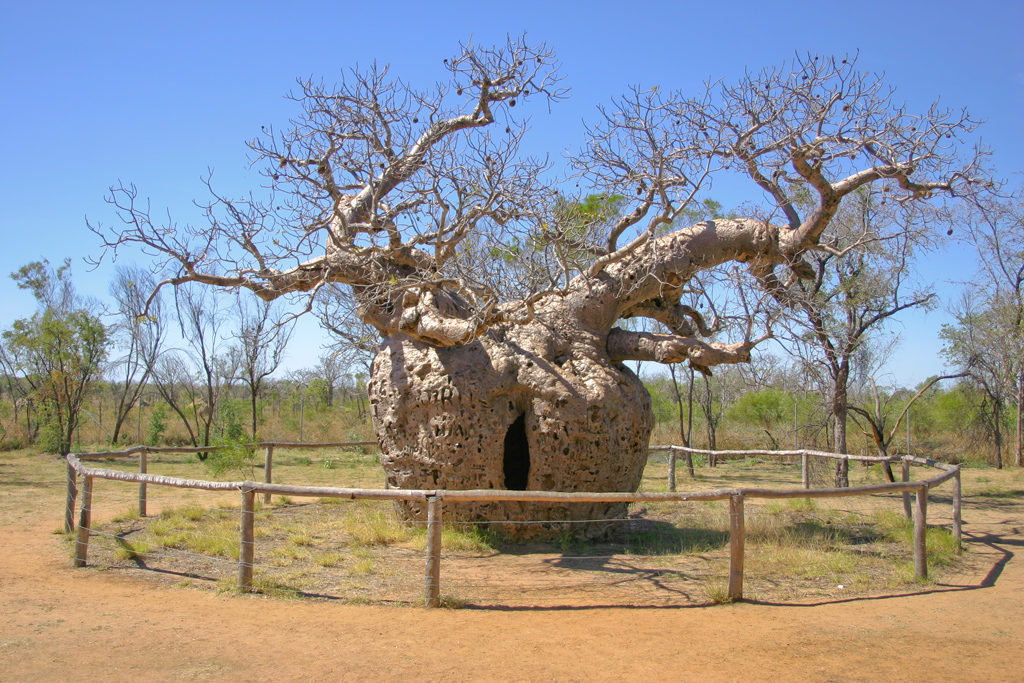
- The tree in 2004
- Interactive map of Baobab Prison Tree
- Species: Adansonia gregorii
- Location: Derby, Western Australia
- Coordinates: 17.3507°S 123.6699°E

The Baobab Prison Tree, Derby is a 1,500-year-old, large hollow Adansonia gregorii (Baobab) tree 6 kilometres south of Derby, Western Australia with a girth of 14.7 metres. It had been reputed to have been used in the 1890s as a lockup for indigenous Australian prisoners on their way to Derby for sentencing, but there is no evidence that it was ever used to house prisoners.

== Early use ==
In the Nyulnyulan languages of the Western Kimberley, boab trees are called 'larrgadiy' (alt. spelling larrgadi) and have considerable mythological significance. The ancient trees are often regarded as cherished individuals with unique personalities.

Anthropologist Herbert Basedow was one of the first Europeans to document the Derby Boab Tree. In his 1916 expedition to the Kimberley region, Basedow photographed it and captioned the image as "the hollow trunk of a live Boab used by the aborigines as hut and burial place, Mayhall's well, King Sound". Basedow (1918) also wrote that: "[t]he natives have long been in the habit of making use of this lusus naturae [freak of nature] as a habitation; it is indeed a dry and comfortable hut". He found bleached human bones lying on the floor, which suggests that Aboriginal people had also used the tree as an ossuary for the dead. The human remains seen at the tree by Basedow and other early non-Indigenous visitors have disappeared, and may have been stolen.

== The 'prison tree' ==
Kristyn Harman and Elizabeth Grant traced the prison tree myth back to 1948. Around that time, an Australian artist called Vlase Zanalis spent eight months camping in and around Derby. Zanalis became intrigued by the region's extraordinary boab trees. When one of his resulting art works titled 'The Boab Tree' was later exhibited at Sydney, the Albany Advertiser described the tree as having in its 'earlier days' had its trunk 'used as a prison of a temporary nature until it was possible to transfer the prisoners to a more permanent abode'.

Harman and Grant concluded that the 'history' of another boab tree (located at Wyndham) was transposed to the Derby tree. Over time, this myth was repeated and became accepted as a 'fact', despite not being supported by the available historical evidence. Kim Akerman also refuted the notion, on the grounds that Aboriginal histories do not support the story that this tree was used to imprison Aboriginal people (either by the Derby police force, or by blackbirders taking enslaved Aboriginal people to the coast).

== The tree today ==
The tree is now a tourist attraction. It is protected under the Aboriginal Heritage Act 1972.

In recent years a fence was erected around the tree to protect it from too much human traffic, carving of initials etc., and compacting of surrounding soil by vehicles.

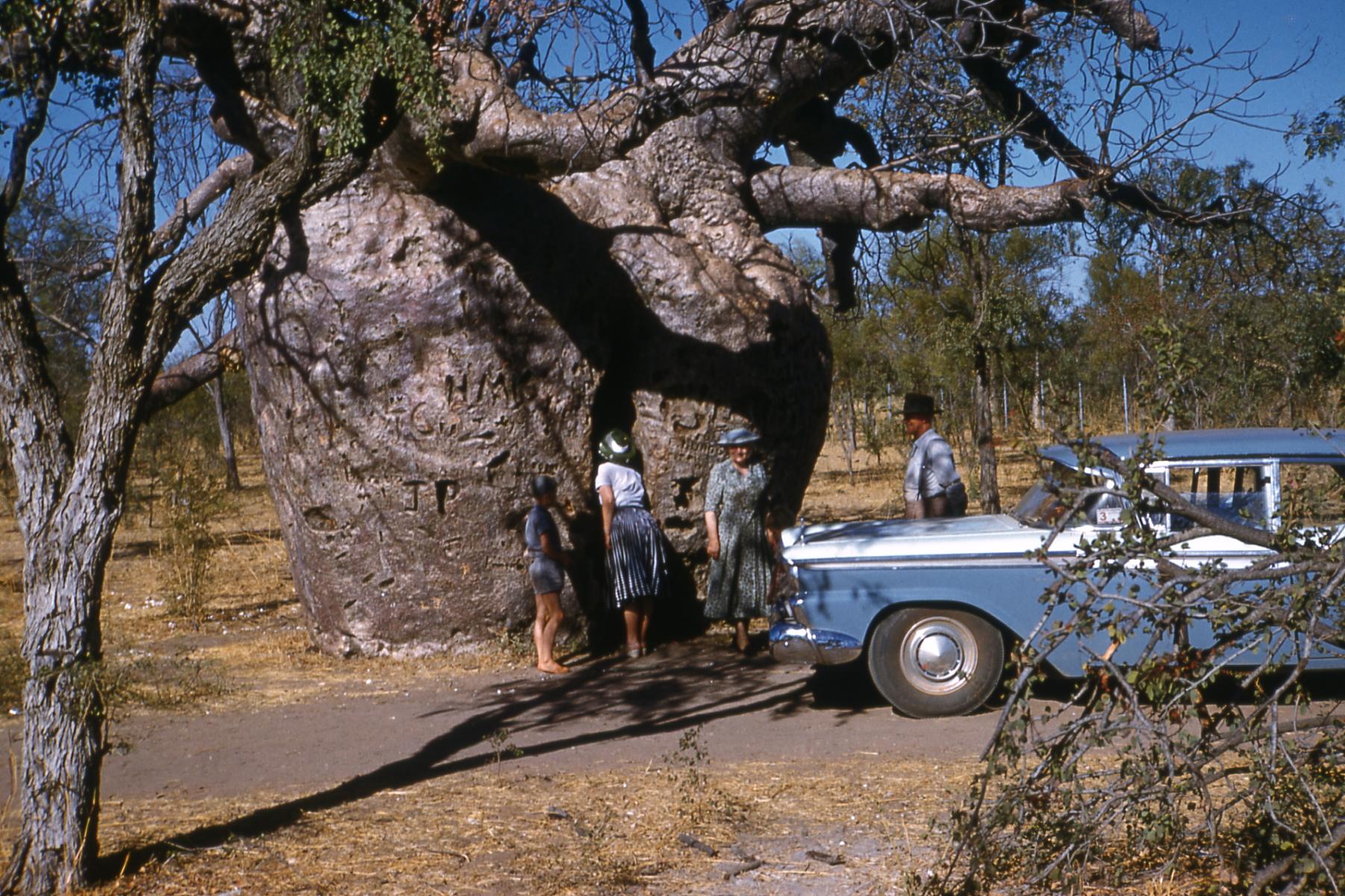
The Boab Prison Tree in 1960.

== See also ==
- Boab Prison Tree, Wyndham
- Jail tree
- List of individual trees
