= Derby, Western Australia =

Derby
- Town
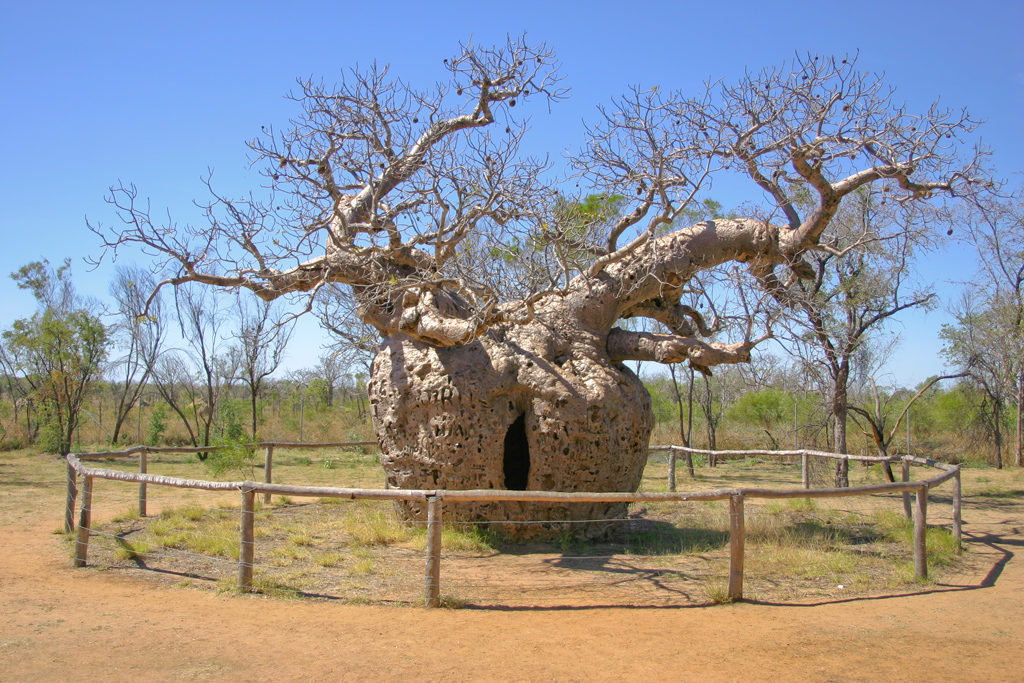
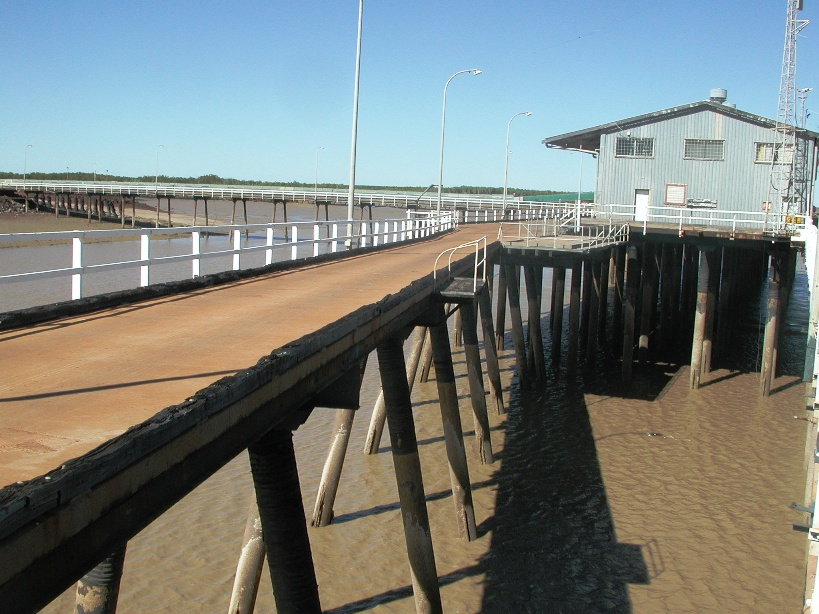
- Local legend claims this boab tree near Derby was used as a prison, hence the name the "Boab Prison Tree" Low tide at the Derby wharf on King Sound

- Interactive map of Derby
- Coordinates: 17°18′40″S 123°38′06″E
- Country: Australia
- State: Western Australia
- LGA: Shire of Derby-West Kimberley
- Location: 220 km (140 mi) from Broome; 903 km (561 mi) from Kununurra; 2,197 km (1,365 mi) from Perth; 1,533 km (953 mi) from Darwin
- Established: 1883

Government
  - State electorate: Kimberley
  - Federal division: Durack

Area
  - Total: 162.4 km^{2} (62.7 sq mi)
- Elevation: 8 m (26 ft)

Population
  - Total: 3,009 (UCL 2021)
- Postcode: 6728
- Mean max temp: 33.9 °C (93.0 °F)
- Mean min temp: 21.7 °C (71.1 °F)
- Annual rainfall: 622.4 mm (24.50 in)

Derby (/ˈdɜːrbi/ DUR-bee) is a town in the Kimberley region of Western Australia. At the 2021 census, Derby had a population of 3,222 with 41.5% of Aboriginal and Torres Strait Islander descent. Along with Broome and Kununurra, it is one of only three towns in the Kimberley to have a population over 2,000. Located on King Sound, Derby has the highest tides in Australia, with the differential between low and high tide reaching 11.8 metres (39 ft).

== History ==
Derby falls within Nyiginka country.

The town was founded in 1883 and named after Edward Stanley, 15th Earl of Derby, the British secretary of state for the colonies.

During World War II, Derby was bombed by Japanese planes because of an air base and jetty that was used by Australian forces. More recently, refugees were housed at Royal Australian Air Force Base Curtin, however the detention centre was closed in 2014.

Derby was famous in the 1920s as the terminus of the first scheduled aviation service in Australia, West Australian Airways Ltd. Their service began with their first flight on 5 December 1921, which crashed, near Geraldton. At one time the Perth to Derby service was the world's longest passenger airline route.

Derby Hospital treated many aboriginal patients with Hansen's Disease, then known as leprosy. The Derby Leprosarium operated from 1936 to 1986, staffed by nuns led by Sr Mary Gertrude.

In 1968 the town had a population of approximately 1,500 people, many employed at the meatworks. A A$900,000 beef road from Glenroy Station to Derby was completed the same year to assist with the development of beef processing. A A$2 million steel and concrete jetty was built in 1965 to provide adequate port facilities for the shipment of live cattle. The West Kimberley Regional Prison, whose architecture won several awards, was opened in 2012.

Local boy Jimmy Taylor disappeared from Derby on 29 August 1974 after walking to a local shop. In 2014, a coroner determined that he had died, but was unable to determine when or how, recording an open verdict. Convicted child killer James Ryan O'Neill was living in Derby at the time of Taylor's disappearance but he has denied any involvement. In 2023, a $1 million reward was offered to anyone who provided information as to what had happened to Taylor.

== Population ==
According to the 2021 census of population, there were 3,222 people in Derby.

- Aboriginal and Torres Strait Islander people made up 41.5% of the population.
- 65.7% of people were born in Australia. The next most common country of birth was New Zealand at 2.4%.
- 54.5% of people spoke only English at home. Other languages spoken at home included Kriol at 2.3%.
- The most common responses for religion were No Religion 30.7% and Catholic 16.9%.

== Culture ==
Derby is rich in cultural diversity, with the local Aboriginal Australian culture playing a large part in the community. The Mowanjum Festival is held annually at Mowanjum Community, located 10 km (6.2 mi) south east of Derby, and features a showcase of traditional art.

The Boab Festival (named after the boab tree) is a fortnight-long festival that includes traditional events such as mud football, watermelon seed spitting, the Mardi Gras and other festivities.

Historically, Derby has played a major role in the Australian Royal Flying Doctor Service for the Kimberley region.

The Kimberley School of the Air is located in Derby. The school provides education to isolated Primary-aged children living on cattle stations and in remote Aboriginal communities and outstations scattered throughout the 423,517 square kilometres (163,521 sq mi) Kimberley region.

Derby has two schools located in the town, Holy Rosary School Derby and Derby District High School. Derby District High School follows Chris Sarra's vision of "Stronger Smarter", which aims to raise the expectations of the school as a community.

Wharfinger's House Museum tells the story of the aviation history of the town as well as the history of the port. The Norval Gallery showcases the work of artist Mark Norval as well as a broad selection of Indigenous artwork from across the Kimberley.

== Economy ==
There is employment in the pastoral and mining industries, as well as administration and tourism. There is oil at Blina, diamond mining at Ellendale. Granite is quarried from the Wunaamin-Miliwundi Ranges and lead and zinc from Cadjebut and an iron ore mine at Koolan Island. A major mineral sands mining project is being developed at Thunderbird, 100 kilometres (62 mi) west of Derby. In 1997 the Derby wharf, which was closed in the 1980s, was re-opened for barging operations for the export of lead and zinc.

Tourism bolsters the local economy between the months of May and September.

The Derby Leprosarium on the outskirts of the town was one of two in Western Australia that helped to contain an epidemic of leprosy from the 1930s to the 1960s.

== Notable people ==
- Keanu Pinder, basketball player who was born and raised in Derby

== Climate ==
Derby has a hot semi-arid climate (Köppen BSh), with a short, highly variable wet season lasting from late December to March. The wet season features hot, humid days and nights and erratic downpours. In some years there may be no wet season at all, as occurred in 1923–24 and in 1951–52, but in other years, such as 1999–2000, more than the average annual rainfall has fallen in a month. Derby can be affected by severe tropical cyclones. The dry season lasts from April to November and features very little rain, warm to hot daytime temperatures, and mild to cool nights. Extremes of temperature range from 47.8 °C (118.0 °F) on 17 November 1968 to 5.0 °C (41.0 °F) on 21 July 1965, while the wettest month on record was January 1917, when 803.6 millimetres (31.64 in) of rain fell, including the wettest day, 7 January 1917, when 418.3 millimetres (16.47 in) was recorded.

Climate data for Derby Post Office (1883 to 1997)
Month	Jan	Feb	Mar	Apr	May	Jun	Jul	Aug	Sep	Oct	Nov	Dec	Year
Record high °C (°F)	45.2 (113.4)	43.8 (110.8)	42.8 (109.0)	42.1 (107.8)	39.4 (102.9)	36.2 (97.2)	36.7 (98.1)	39.5 (103.1)	42.8 (109.0)	43.4 (110.1)	47.8 (118.0)	45.7 (114.3)	47.8 (118.0)
Mean daily maximum °C (°F)	35.0 (95.0)	34.7 (94.5)	35.3 (95.5)	35.2 (95.4)	32.4 (90.3)	30.1 (86.2)	29.6 (85.3)	31.7 (89.1)	34.2 (93.6)	35.7 (96.3)	36.5 (97.7)	36.2 (97.2)	33.9 (93.0)
Mean daily minimum °C (°F)	25.9 (78.6)	25.6 (78.1)	25.2 (77.4)	22.7 (72.9)	19.2 (66.6)	16.2 (61.2)	14.7 (58.5)	16.2 (61.2)	19.4 (66.9)	23.0 (73.4)	25.5 (77.9)	26.4 (79.5)	21.7 (71.1)
Record low °C (°F)	17.1 (62.8)	19.4 (66.9)	18.8 (65.8)	13.9 (57.0)	9.6 (49.3)	5.8 (42.4)	5.0 (41.0)	8.0 (46.4)	12.4 (54.3)	14.0 (57.2)	18.8 (65.8)	20.3 (68.5)	6.0 (42.8)
Average rainfall mm (inches)	181.7 (7.15)	157.3 (6.19)	108.9 (4.29)	31.0 (1.22)	22.1 (0.87)	10.4 (0.41)	5.9 (0.23)	1.3 (0.05)	0.3 (0.01)	2.5 (0.10)	16.2 (0.64)	83.1 (3.27)	620.7 (24.43)
Average rainy days (≥ 0.2 mm)	11.8	10.6	7.9	2.4	1.4	1.0	0.5	0.1	0.1	0.5	1.9	6.5	44.7
Average relative humidity (%)	67	69	63	52	45	44	40	39	43	51	55	61	52
Source: Bureau of Meteorology

Climate data for Derby Aero (1991–2020 norms, extremes 1972–present)
Month	Jan	Feb	Mar	Apr	May	Jun	Jul	Aug	Sep	Oct	Nov	Dec	Year
Record high °C (°F)	44.0 (111.2)	43.8 (110.8)	41.9 (107.4)	41.5 (106.7)	40.3 (104.5)	36.6 (97.9)	36.2 (97.2)	40.7 (105.3)	42.7 (108.9)	44.8 (112.6)	44.6 (112.3)	45.6 (114.1)	45.6 (114.1)
Mean daily maximum °C (°F)	35.2 (95.4)	34.7 (94.5)	35.5 (95.9)	35.9 (96.6)	33.1 (91.6)	30.9 (87.6)	31.0 (87.8)	32.8 (91.0)	35.9 (96.6)	37.4 (99.3)	38.4 (101.1)	37.1 (98.8)	34.8 (94.6)
Mean daily minimum °C (°F)	25.8 (78.4)	25.6 (78.1)	25.2 (77.4)	22.9 (73.2)	18.6 (65.5)	15.7 (60.3)	14.5 (58.1)	15.2 (59.4)	19.1 (66.4)	23.3 (73.9)	25.6 (78.1)	26.3 (79.3)	21.5 (70.7)
Record low °C (°F)	19.2 (66.6)	19.2 (66.6)	19.3 (66.7)	13.7 (56.7)	8.2 (46.8)	6.1 (43.0)	6.0 (42.8)	6.1 (43.0)	9.1 (48.4)	11.7 (53.1)	18.5 (65.3)	18.5 (65.3)	6.0 (42.8)
Average rainfall mm (inches)	224.9 (8.85)	219.9 (8.66)	149.8 (5.90)	20.8 (0.82)	22.7 (0.89)	6.8 (0.27)	9.6 (0.38)	1.6 (0.06)	0.7 (0.03)	2.8 (0.11)	15.2 (0.60)	129.8 (5.11)	804.6 (31.68)
Average rainy days	14.8	13.2	11.1	3.3	1.9	1.0	0.8	0.2	0.2	1.3	2.3	10.0	60.1
Average relative humidity (%)	62	67	59	46	35	33	30	27	34	40	42	56	44
Source: Bureau of Meteorology

== Sport and recreation ==
Derby hosts a lawn bowling club and Derby Golf Club.
