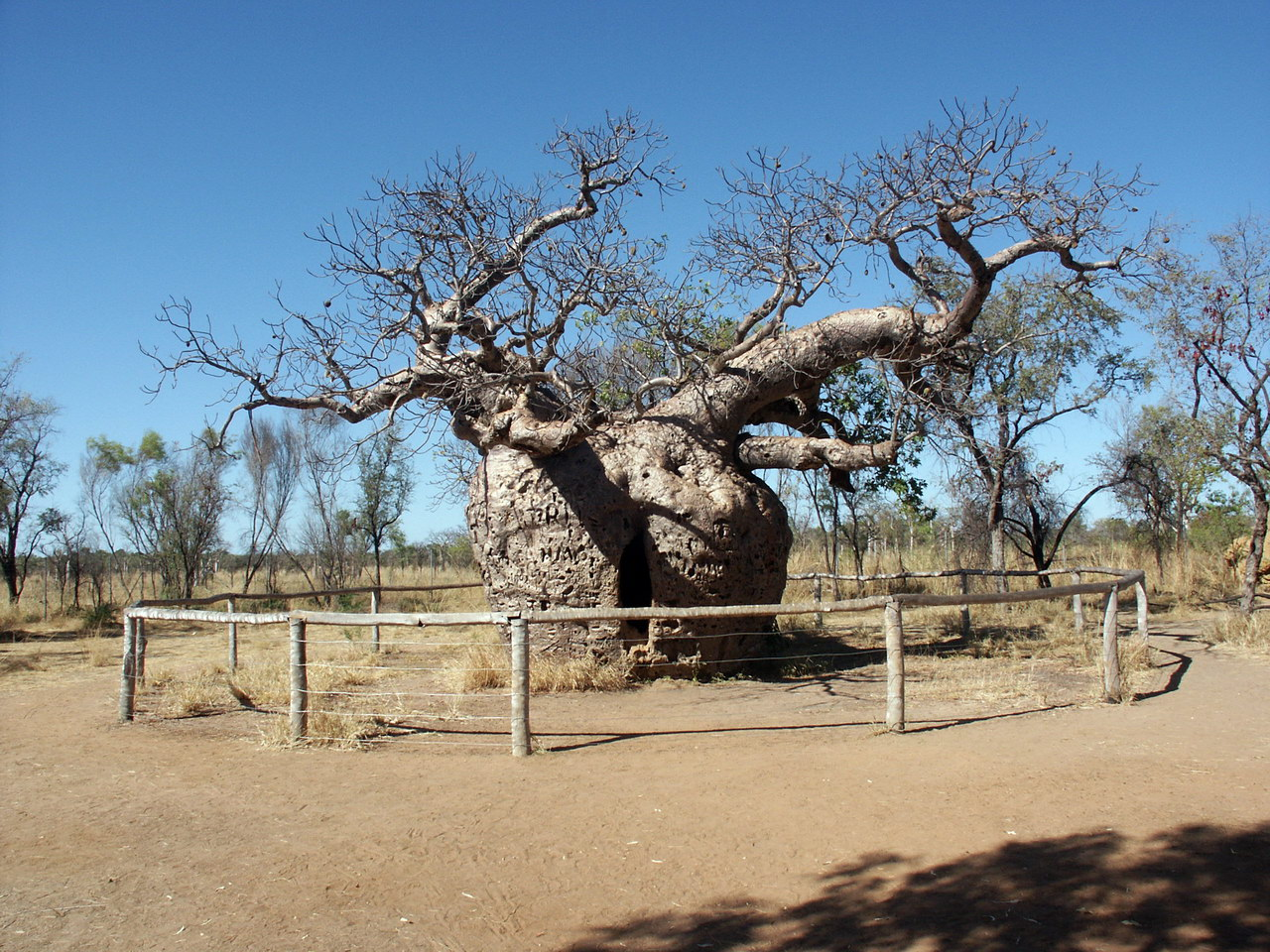

Conservation status
- Least Concern (IUCN 3.1)

Scientific classification
- Kingdom: Plantae
- Clade: Tracheophytes
- Clade: Angiosperms
- Clade: Eudicots
- Clade: Rosids
- Order: Malvales
- Family: Malvaceae
- Genus: Adansonia
- Species: A. gregorii

Binomial name
- Adansonia gregorii F.Muell.
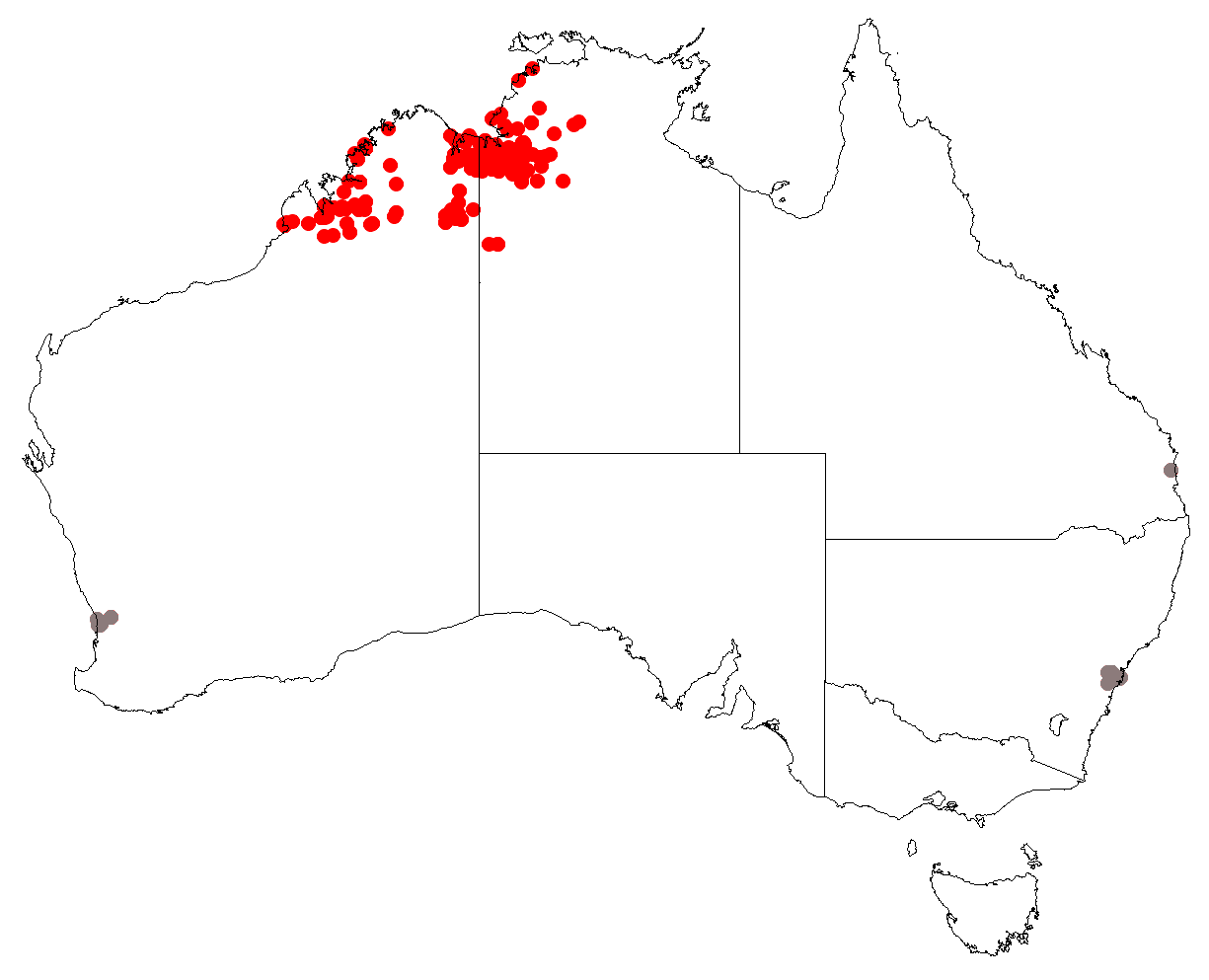
- Occurrence records from GBIF

= Adansonia gregorii =

Boab

Species of tree

Adansonia gregorii, commonly known as the boab and also known by a number of other names, is a tree in the family Malvaceae, endemic to the northern regions of Western Australia and the Northern Territory of Australia.

== Names ==
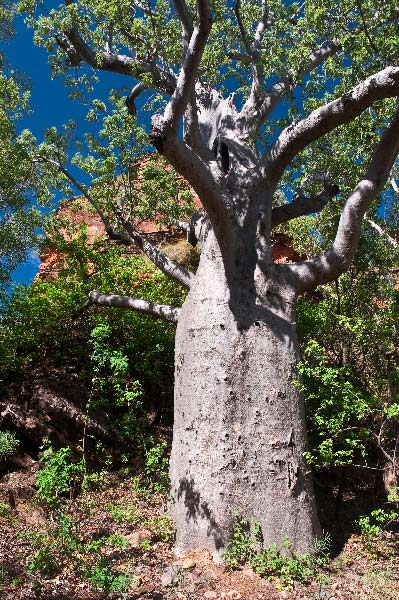
Boab near Kununurra, WA

The specific name gregorii honours the Australian explorer Augustus Gregory.

The most widely recognised common name is 'boab', which is a shortened form of the generic common name 'boabab'. It does, however, have many other common names, including:

- baobab — the common name for the genus as a whole, but often used in Australia to refer to the Australian species
- Australian baobab
- boabab was in common use from the late 1850s (Perhaps the origin of boab)
- baob

Gadawon is one of the names used by the local Aboriginal Australian groups. Other names include larrgadi or larrgadiy, which is widespread in the Nyulnyulan languages of the Western Kimberley.

Other names include:

- bottle tree or bottletree
- cream of tartar tree
- gourd-gourd tree
- gouty stem tree
- monkey bread tree
- sour gourd
- upside down tree
- dead rat tree

== Habitat ==
Endemic to Australia, boab occurs in the Kimberley region of Western Australia and east into the Northern Territory. It is the only baobab to occur in Australia, the others being native to Madagascar and mainland Africa and the Arabian Peninsula. There are various theories as to how the tree got to Australia, with A. gregorii and A. digitata, its African relative, being very similar genetically.

It can grow from sea level to about 300 m (980 ft) in altitude, and is most often found in open forest and rocky areas, but is also seen in monsoon forest.

== Description ==
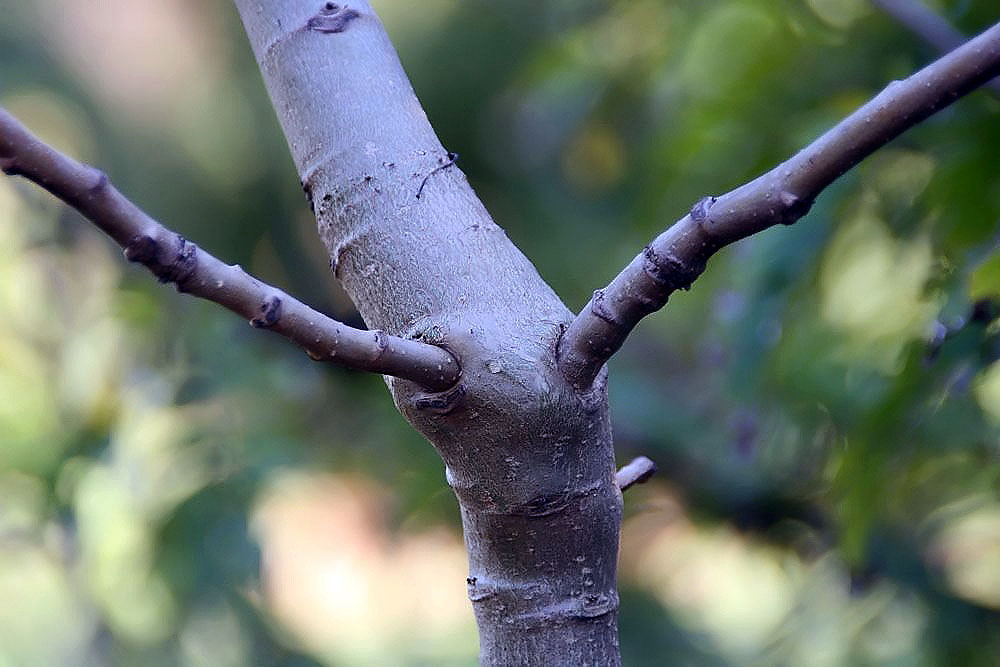
Adansonia gregorii branch

As with other baobabs, Adansonia gregorii is easily recognised by the swollen base of its trunk, which forms a massive caudex, giving the tree a bottle-like appearance. Boab ranges from 5–15 m (16–49 ft) in height, usually 9–12 m (30–39 ft), with a broad bottle-shaped trunk, up to 5 m (16 ft) in diameter.

A. gregorii is deciduous, losing its leaves during the dry winter period and producing new leaves and large white flowers between December and May, up to 75 mm (3.0 in) long. The flowers open at night, and have a calyx about 6 cm (2.4 in) long. The inner surface is densely sericeous.

Boabs are pollinated by the convolvulus hawk-moth Agrius convolvuli.

The tree's bark has a remarkable property, in that it can maintain inscribed markings for long periods of time, over more than a century. Some specimens of the African relative of boabs have been estimated to live close to 2,000 years, but the Australian ones are not as well-documented.

== Uses ==
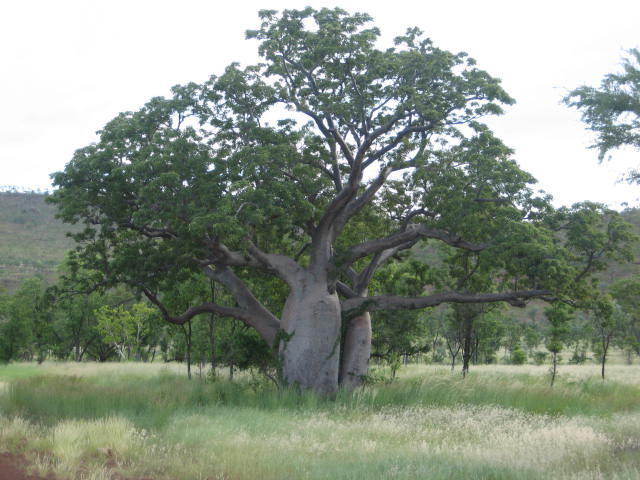
Boab in the Kimberley

The plant has a wide variety of uses; most parts are edible and it is the source of a number of materials. Its medicinal products and the ability to store water through dry seasons has been exploited. Aboriginal Australians obtained water from the tree, owing to its ability to store huge amounts of water; some of the oldest and largest trees can hold more than 100,000 L (22,000 imp gal; 26,000 US gal) of water in their trunks. They also use the white powder that fills the seed pods (or pith, said to taste like sherbet or cream of tartar) as a food.

Decorative paintings or carvings were sometimes made on the outer surface of the fruit.

The bark and leaves are used medicinally, in particular for digestive ailments.

The root fibres are used to create string.

The 1889 book Useful Native Plants of Australia states that "The dry acidulous pulp of the fruit is eaten. It has an agreeable taste, like cream of tartar".

European use of the trees has included letter boxes and jails.

The leaves may see a future use prepared as food, due to their high iron content. The leaves can be boiled and eaten as a spinach; the seeds can be ground and used as a coffee-like beverage, and fermenting the pulp creates a type of beer.

== Notable trees ==
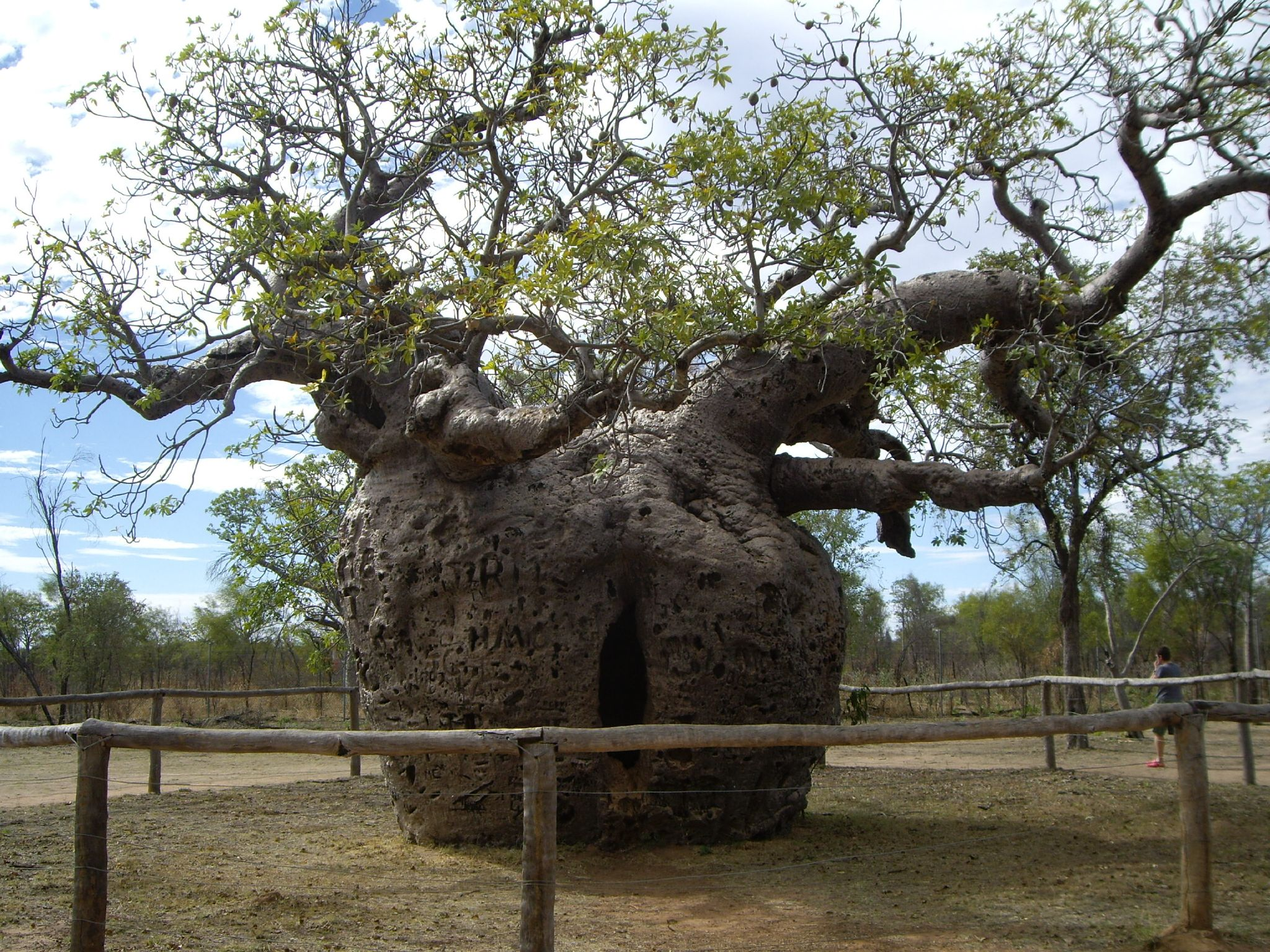
Boab Prison Tree

A large hollow boab south of Derby, Western Australia is reputed to have been used in the 1890s as a lockup for Aboriginal prisoners on their way to Derby for sentencing. The Boab Prison Tree, Derby is now a tourist attraction.. This claim has been found to be a myth dating from the 1940s and likely due to the actual use of a large boab near Wyndam that was used as a temporary lock up.

Another hollow boab near Wyndham, Western Australia was used as a prison tree. The Hillgrove Lockup or Wyndham Prison Tree is on the King River Road out of Wyndham near the Moochalabra Dam. There is also a boab tree located within the Wyndham Caravan Park that is billed as "the biggest boab in captivity".

Gija Jumulu is a large boab which was transported from Warmun in the Kimberley region to Kings Park in the Western Australian capital city, Perth in 2008. As of 2019 the tree was growing well, after an initial period showing signs of stress after the move, demonstrating the adaptability of the species in a different climate.

Gregory's Tree, in the Gregory's Tree Historical Reserve at Timber Creek, NT, is an Aboriginal sacred site and a registered Australian heritage site. The boab tree marks the site of a camp of the explorer Augustus Charles Gregory, and is inscribed with the dates of his party's arrival and departure, from October 1855 to July 1856.

== Dendroglyphs ==
In 2021, a collaborative project to find and trace histories etched in boab trees in the Kimberley was launched. Funded by the Australian Research Council, archaeologists from the Australian National University (ANU), the University of Western Australia, the University of Canberra, and University of Notre Dame Australia are working with Aboriginal communities and using advanced technology (photogrammetry) to record 3D images of carvings on the trees. It is "the first systematic survey and recording program of carved boab trees in Australia".

In October 2022, the team published the results of their recent survey of such trees in the Tanami Desert. The survey records the tree markings, also known as dendroglyphs, relating to the Lingka Dreaming track across the desert. Also known as the King Brown Snake dreaming, many of the carvings are of snakes, but also include emu and kangaroo tracks; geometric markings; and, further west, crocodiles, turtles and Wanjina figures. The researchers also found stone artefacts and broken grinding stones, used for grinding seeds, as camps were often made underneath the large shady trees.

== In film ==
A boab tree is featured in the 1992 animated film FernGully: The Last Rainforest to imprison the film's antagonist, Hexxus.

The boab tree is celebrated in the end credits of the 2008 film Australia with the song "By the Boab Tree", a song nominated for a 2008 Satellite Award, with lyrics by Baz Luhrmann and performed by Sydney singer Angela Little.

== Gallery ==
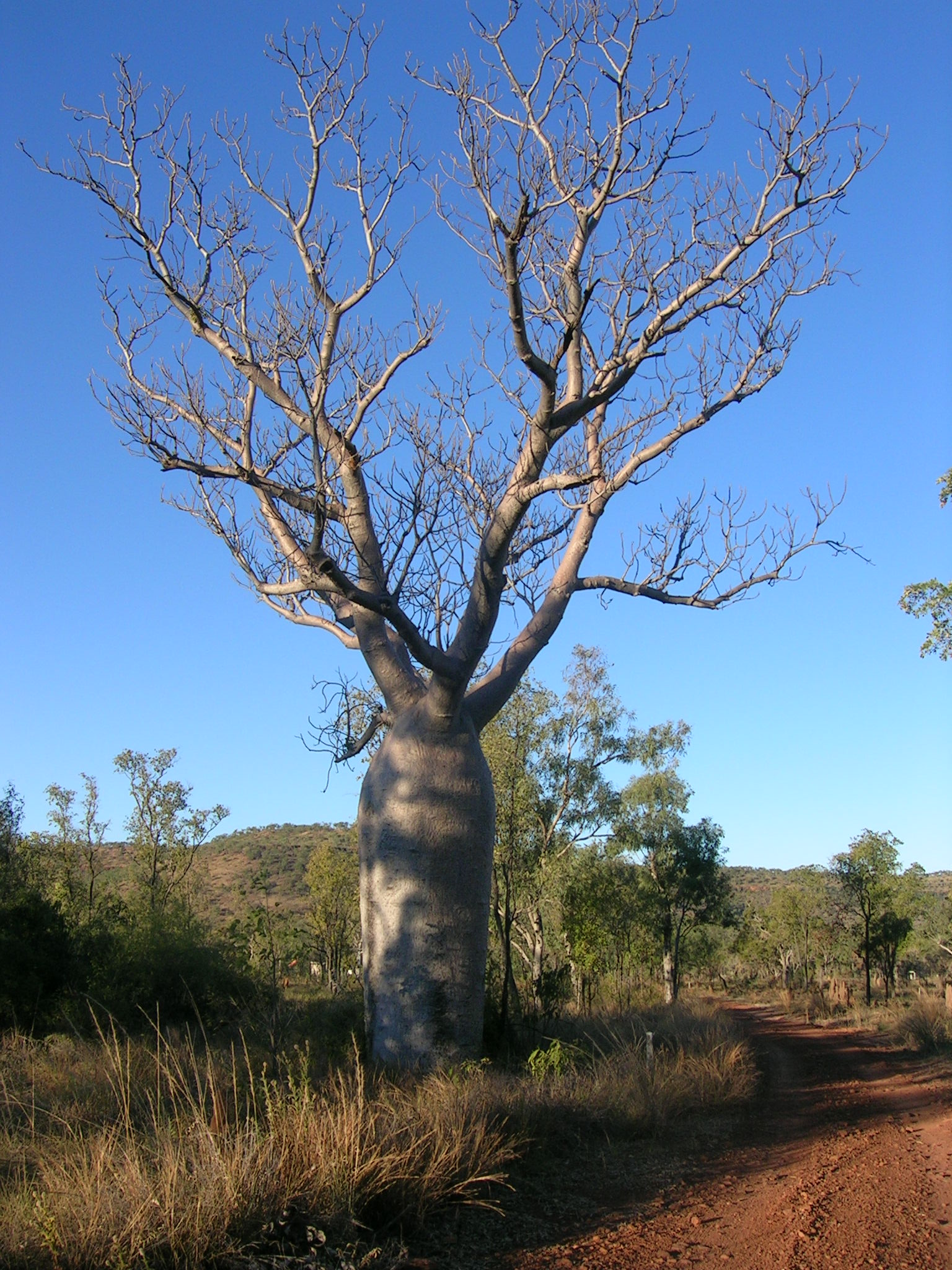
Boab in Timber Creek, NT

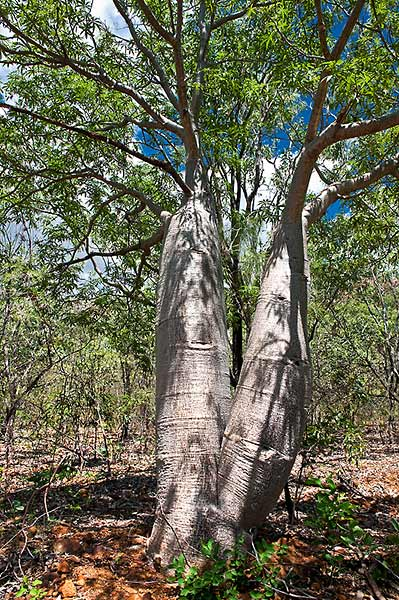
Boab in Nitmiluk (Katherine Gorge), NT

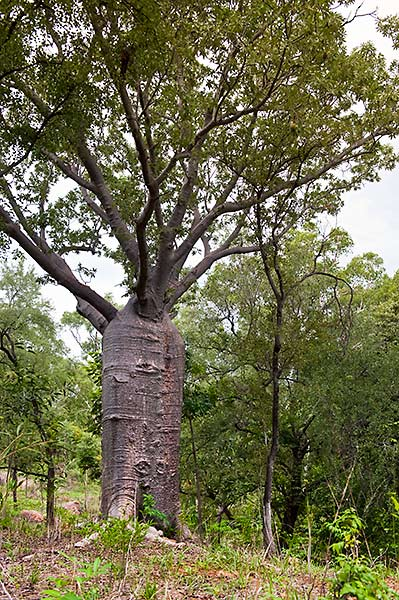
Boab at Katherine River, NT

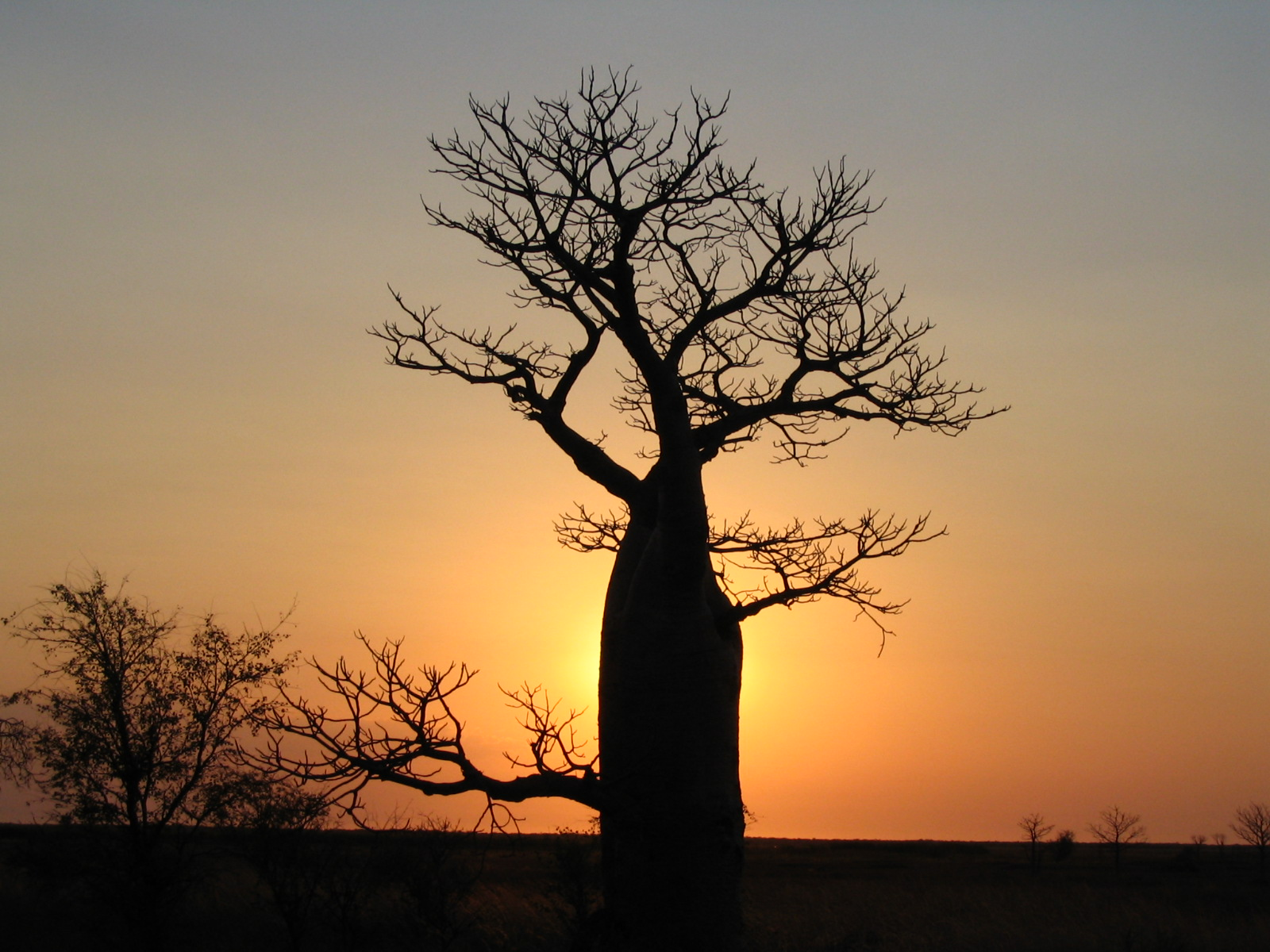
Boab tree sunset near Derby, WA
