= Joseph Bonaparte Gulf =

Gulf in Northern Territory and Western Australia

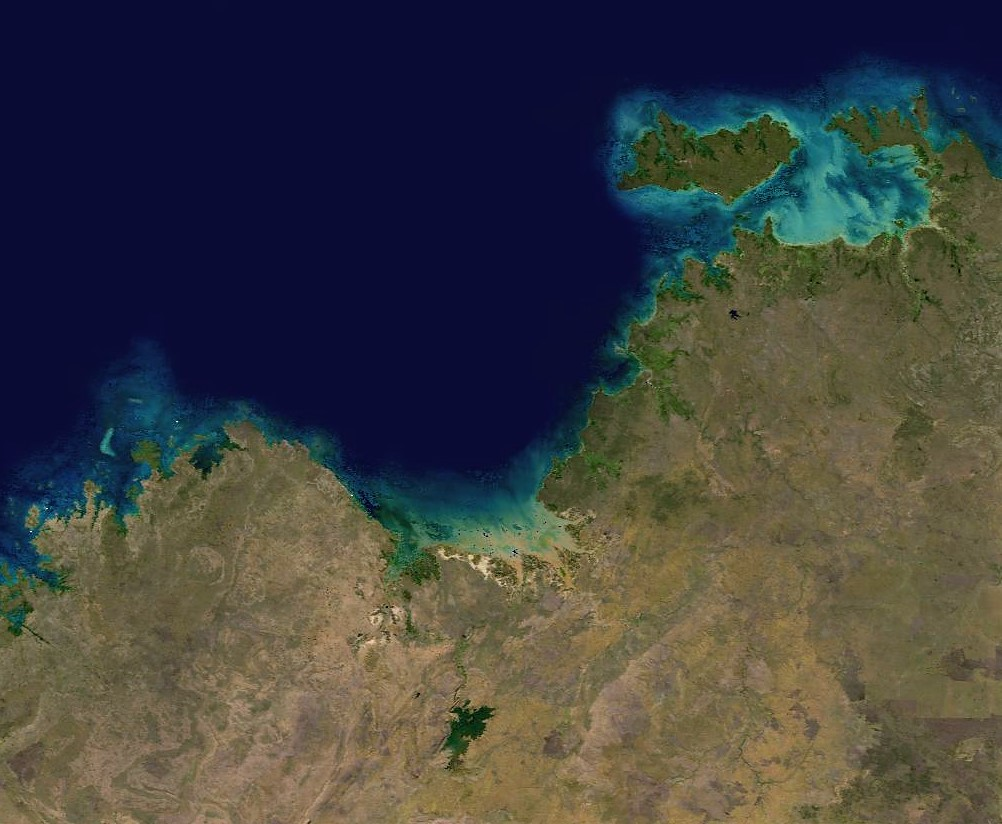
- A satellite image of Joseph Bonaparte Gulf, from NASA – Cambridge Gulf is at the bottom of the gulf

- Location within Western Australia
- Location: Northwest coast of Australia, between Western Australia and Northern Territory
- Coordinates: 14°06′S 128°50′E
- Type: Gulf
- Part of: Timor Sea
- Primary inflows: Keep River, Victoria River, Cambridge Gulf
- Settlements: Wyndham

The Joseph Bonaparte Gulf or the Bonaparte Gulf is a large body of water off the coast of the Northern Territory and Western Australia and part of the Timor Sea. It was named after Joseph Bonaparte, brother of Napoleon and King of Naples (1806–1808) and then Spain (1808–1813) by French explorer and naturalist Nicolas Baudin in 1803.

== Description ==
The Keep River and Victoria River drain into the gulf in the Northern Territory, the former close to the Western Australia – Northern Territory border.

The Ord River, Pentecost River, Durack River, King River and the Forrest River drain into the Cambridge Gulf, another gulf within the southern part of the Joseph Bonaparte Gulf.

The Legune (Joseph Bonaparte Bay) Important Bird Area lies at the south-eastern end of the gulf. The Bonaparte Basin is a large sedimentary basin underlying the gulf and a large part of the Timor Sea, deriving its name from the Joseph Bonaparte Gulf, which has several producing and potential oilfields.

The traditional custodians of the areas around the gulf are the Menhdheyangal people.
