= Adolphus Island =

Island in Western Australia

Adolphus
- Location of Adolphus Island

Geography
- Location: Cambridge Gulf
- Coordinates: 15°7′00″S 128°9′00″E
- Area: 4,157 ha (10,270 acres)
- Length: 18.59 km (11.551 mi)
- Width: 9 km (5.6 mi)
- Coastline: 44.9 km (27.9 mi)
- Highest elevation: 235 m (771 ft)

Administration
- Australia

Demographics
- Population: 0

Adolphus Island is an uninhabited island located in the Kimberley region of Western Australia. It is situated in Cambridge Gulf approximately 35 kilometres (22 mi) north of Wyndham and covers an area of about 4,157 hectares (10,272 acres). The island has a maximum height of approximately 770 feet (235 m).

The island, the gulf and many other features surrounding the gulf were named by Philip Parker King who visited the area in 1819 aboard the survey cutter HMS Mermaid but left after spending eleven days charting the gulf, being unable to find supplies of freshwater in the mudflats, rivers and hills that surround the Cambridge Gulf. King named the island after the Duke of Cambridge at the time, Prince Adolphus.

One of the earliest European burials in Western Australia occurred on Adolphus Island at Nicholls Point, ten years before the foundation of the Swan River Colony, during King's time in Cambridge Gulf. The following passages from King's journals start on 27 September 1819.

I have this day to record the death of one of the crew, William Nicholls, who, for some time past, and particularly during the last three days, had been suffering from a dropsical complaint; his death was occasioned by suffocation, having very imprudently laid down with his head to leeward while we were under sail: this poor fellow had been for nearly three months on our sick list; he was a native of Norfolk Island, and, when in health, had been one of my most useful and attentive men.

September 28.

He was interred the next morning on shore; in memorial whereof the north-west point of the island was named after him.

King later mentions the death on 30 September, after they had left Cambridge Gulf.

...we had only lost one man; and this from a complaint which even medical assistance might not, perhaps, have cured; and by an accident which could not have been prevented, for our people were at the moment so busily employed in working the vessel through a dangerous navigation that the unfortunate man's situation was not known until the vital spark was nearly extinct, and too far gone for any human means to save his life.

The island is home to endangered flora such as Brachychiton incanus and a variety of birdlife such as rufous night heron, little eagle, brown falcon, whimbrel, tawny frogmouth, great bowerbird and rainbow bee-eater. The agile wallaby is commonly sighted on the island.
