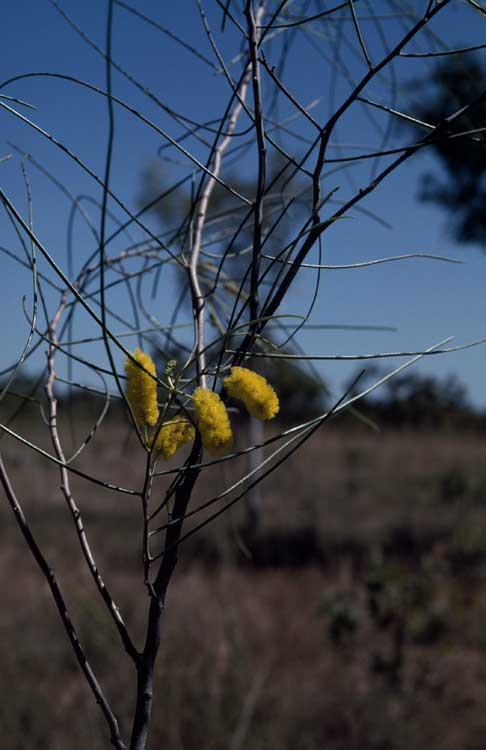
- Near the Gibb River Road

Scientific classification
- Kingdom: Plantae
- Clade: Tracheophytes
- Clade: Angiosperms
- Clade: Eudicots
- Clade: Rosids
- Order: Fabales
- Family: Fabaceae
- Subfamily: Caesalpinioideae
- Clade: Mimosoid clade
- Genus: Acacia
- Species: A. filamentosa

Binomial name
- Acacia filamentosa Maslin
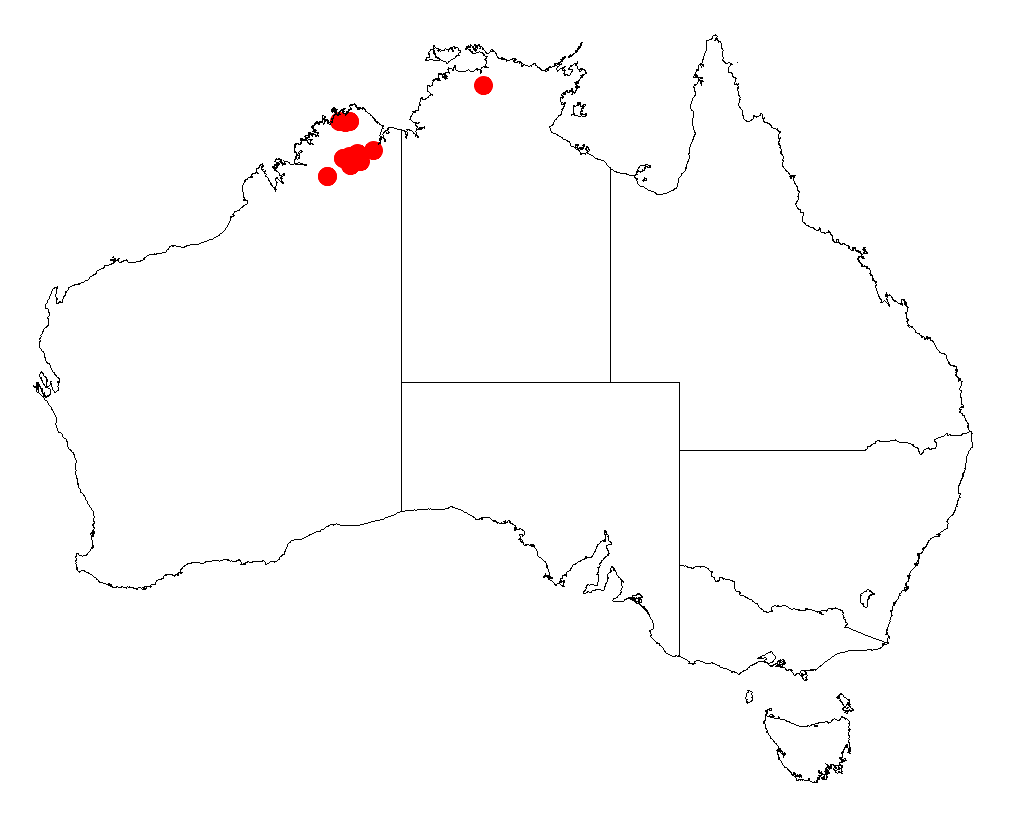
- Occurrence data from AVH

Synonyms
- Racosperma filamentosum (Maslin) Pedley

= Acacia filamentosa =

Species of legume

Acacia filamentosa is a species of flowering plant in the family Fabaceae and is endemic to the north of Western Australia. It is a shrub with ascending, thread-like to curved or terete phyllodes, densely flowered spikes of yellow flowers and linear, crusty to thinly leathery pods.

== Description ==
Acacia filamentosa is a glabrous shrub that typically grows to a height of 0.9–2 m (3–7 ft) and sometimes has resinous branchlets. Its phyllodes are ascending, coarsely thread-like, curved to shallowly curved, terete, 150–200 mm (5.9–7.9 in) long and about 1 mm (0.039 in) wide with about eight, very obscure veins. The flowers are borne in two densely flowered spikes 20–25 mm (0.79–0.98 in) long and 6 mm (0.24 in) in diameter, in axils on peduncles 5–15 mm (0.20–0.59 in) long. Flowering occurs from June to September, and the pods are crusty to thinly leathery and glabrous, up to 110 mm (4.3 in) long, 3 mm (0.12 in) wide and striated. The seeds are narrowly oblong, 6–7 mm (0.24–0.28 in) long, brown with a yellowish band and a pale yellowish, top-shaped aril.

== Taxonomy ==
Acacia filamentosa was first formally described in 1983 by Bruce Maslin from specimens collected near the Gibb River Road, near the turnoff to Ellenbrae in 1980. The specific epithet (filamentosa) means 'abounding in threads', referring to the phyllodes.

== Distribution and habitat ==
This species of wattle grows on sandstone hills, and is only known from a few locations in the Kimberley region of Western Australia, including Adcock Gorge (about 300 km (190 mi) south-west of Wyndham, Pentecost Downs Station (about 150 km (93 mi) south-west of Wyndham) and near Kalumburu.

== Conservation status ==
Acacia filamentosa is listed as "not threatened" by the Government of Western Australia Department of Biodiversity, Conservation and Attractions.

== See also ==
- List of Acacia species
