= Windham Township =

Windham Township may refer to:

== Canada ==
- Windham Township, Ontario, a historic township

== United States ==
- Windham Township, Portage County, Ohio
- Windham Township, Bradford County, Pennsylvania
- Windham Township, Wyoming County, Pennsylvania

== See also ==
- Windham (disambiguation)
