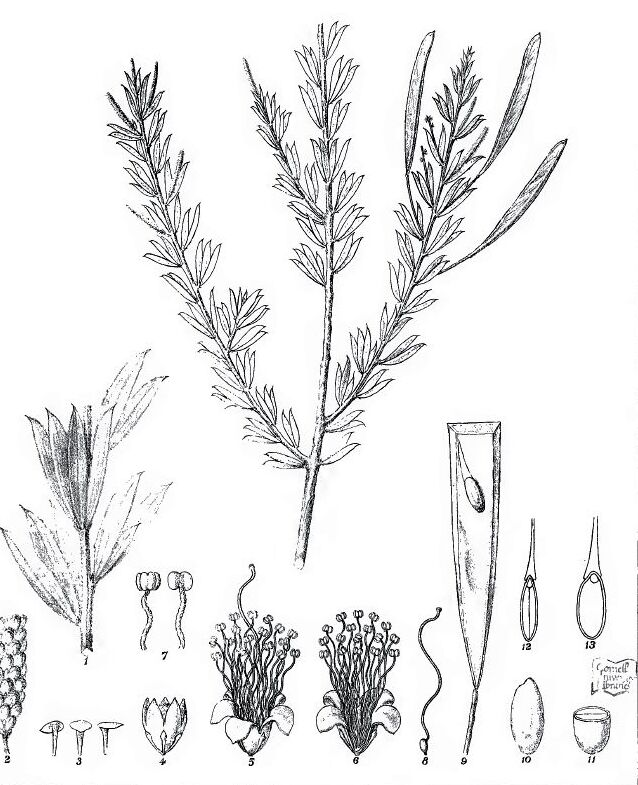
- Drawing by Robert Graff

Scientific classification
- Kingdom: Plantae
- Clade: Tracheophytes
- Clade: Angiosperms
- Clade: Eudicots
- Clade: Rosids
- Order: Fabales
- Family: Fabaceae
- Subfamily: Caesalpinioideae
- Clade: Mimosoid clade
- Genus: Acacia
- Species: A. conjunctifolia

Binomial name
- Acacia conjunctifolia F.Muell.
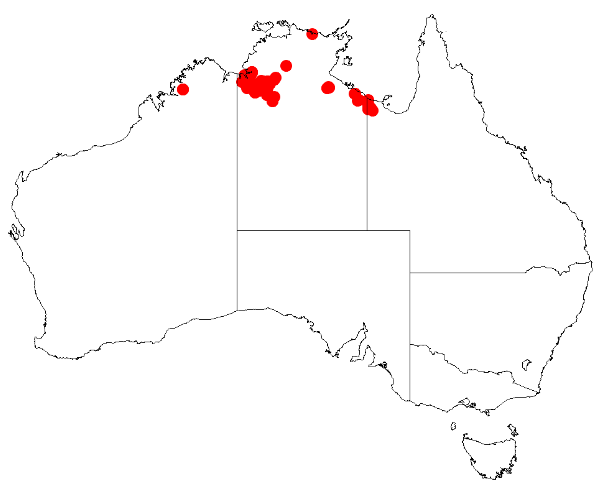
- Occurrence data from AVH

Synonyms
- Racosperma conjunctifolium (F.Muell.) Pedley

= Acacia conjunctifolia =

Species of legume

Acacia conjunctifolia is a species of flowering plant in the family Fabaceae and is endemic to northern Australia. It is a glabrous, sticky shrub with phyllodes sometimes arranged in clusters, spikes of pale yellow flowers and erect, straight to slightly curved linear to narrowly lance-shaped pods.

== Description ==
Acacia conjunctifolia is a glabrous, sticky shrub that typically grows to a height of up to 2 m (6 ft 7 in), its branchlets with prominent ridges and angular to almost flattened tips. The phyllodes occur singly or in clusters of up to four, and are narrowly elliptic to narrowly lance-shaped with the narrower end towards the base, 8–21 mm (0.31–0.83 in) long, 1–3.5 mm (0.039–0.138 in) wide and straight to slightly curved with a prominent midvein and up to three glands on the edges. The flowers are borne in spikes 7–30 mm (0.28–1.18 in) long and are pale yellow. Flowering occurs between May and September and the pods are erect, narrowly lance-shaped to more or less linear, straight to slightly curved, 30–70 mm (1.2–2.8 in) long, 3.5–7 mm (0.14–0.28 in) wide and often winged. The seeds are dark brown seeds, oblong to narrowly oblong and 3–6 mm (0.12–0.24 in) long with a narrowly conical aril.

== Taxonomy ==
Acacia conjunctifolia was first formally described 1n 1879 by Ferdinand von Mueller in his Fragmenta Phytographiae Australiae from specimens collected near the Victoria River by Benjamin Gulliver. The specific epithet (conjunctifolia) means 'connected-leaved', referring to the often-connected phyllodes.

== Distribution and habitat ==
This species of wattle is found through the top end of the Northern Territory and a small part of north western Queensland where it grows in stony and sandy soils usually on laterite or quartzite in Eucalypt woodlands or scrubby open forest communities. It is also found in Western Australia where it is found in the Northern Kimberley and Victoria Bonaparte bioregions on sandstone outcrops above creek beds.

== Conservation status ==
Acacia conjunctifolia is listed as "not threatened" by the Government of Western Australia Department of Biodiversity, Conservation and Attractions, and as of "least concern" under the Territory Parks and Wildlife Conservation Act and Queensland Government Nature Conservation Act 1992.

== See also ==
- List of Acacia species
