= Windham Township, Pennsylvania =

Windham Township is the name of two separate towns in the U.S. state of Pennsylvania:

- Windham Township, Bradford County, Pennsylvania
- Windham Township, Wyoming County, Pennsylvania
