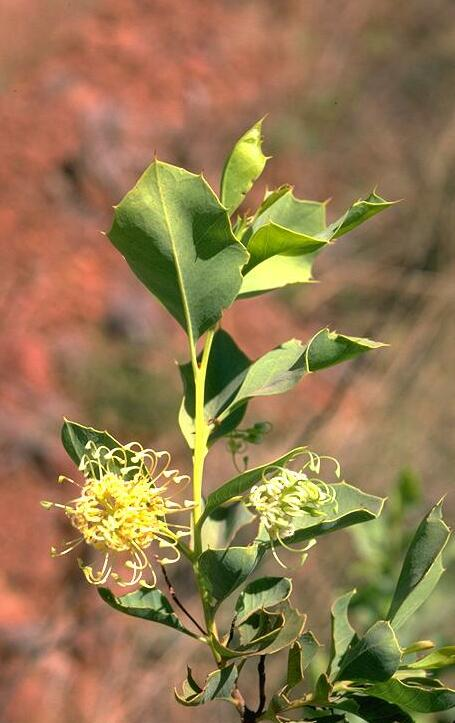
- At Wave Hill

Scientific classification
- Kingdom: Plantae
- Clade: Tracheophytes
- Clade: Angiosperms
- Clade: Eudicots
- Order: Proteales
- Family: Proteaceae
- Genus: Grevillea
- Species: G. prasina

Binomial name
- Grevillea prasina McGill.

= Grevillea prasina =

Species of shrub endemic to Australia

Grevillea prasina is a species of flowering plant in the family Proteaceae and is endemic to north-western Australia. It is a spreading or straggly shrub with egg-shaped to elliptic leaves with coarsely-toothed edges, and dense, cream-coloured to pale yellow flowers, the style pale green to white.

== Description ==
Grevillea prasina is a spreading or straggly shrub that typically grows to a height of 1–4.5 m (3 ft 3 in – 14 ft 9 in). Its leaves are egg-shaped or elliptic in outline, 60–80 mm (2.4–3.1 in) long and 20–50 mm (0.79–1.97 in) wide with 5 to 11 evenly-spaced teeth on the edges, both surfaces more or less glabrous and bright yellowish-green. The flowers are arranged on the ends of branches or in leaf axils in dense, sometimes branched clusters, each cluster oval to short-cylindrical on a rachis 10–30 mm (0.39–1.18 in) long. The flowers are fragrant, cream-coloured at first, later pale yellow and the style is green to white with a green tip, the pistil 18.5–22 mm (0.73–0.87 in) long. Flowering occurs from March to October and the fruit is glabrous, elliptic follicle 8.5–16 mm (0.33–0.63 in) long.

== Taxonomy ==
Grevillea prasina was first formally described in 1986 by Donald McGillivray in his book New Names in Grevillea (Proteaceae) from specimens collected by Rayden Alfred Perryon "39 mi (63 km) W/N.W. of Wave Hill Police Station" in 1949. The specific epithet (prasina) means "leek green".

== Distribution and habitat ==
This grevillea grows in open woodland or shrubland between the Pentecost River in the Kimberley region of Western Australia to Port Keats in the Northern Territory, with a few scattered populations as far east as the Gulf of Carpentaria.

== See also ==
- List of Grevillea species
