= Wyndham =

Wyndham may refer to:

- Wyndham (name), a surname and given name

== Places ==
=== Australia ===
- City of Wyndham, an LGA (local government area) in Victoria
- Shire of Wyndham-East Kimberley, a LGA in Western Australia
- Wyndham Important Bird Area, Western Australia
- Wyndham, New South Wales
- Wyndham, Western Australia, a town in Western Australia

=== United Kingdom ===
- Wyndham, Bridgend, a village in Wales
- Wyndham Court, a block of social housing in Southampton, England
- Wyndham House, Oxford, a retirement home in Oxford, England
- Wyndham's Theatre, a West End theatre in London

=== United States ===
- Wyndham, Virginia, a town
- The Wyndham, an apartment building in Indianapolis, Indiana, on the National Register of Historic Places

=== Elsewhere ===
- Wyndham, New Zealand, a town in Southland, South Island
- Wyndham Street (once known as Pedder Hill) in Central, Hong Kong

== Other ==
- Travel + Leisure Co., formerly Wyndham Destinations, an American timeshare company
  - Wyndham Vacation Resorts Asia Pacific, a vacation ownership company and subsidiary of Wyndham Destinations
- Wyndham Hotels & Resorts, an international hotel chain
  - Wyndham Championship, a PGA golf tournament in the United States
- Wyndham College, a senior high school in Sydney, Australia
- Wyndham School, the former name of West Lakes Academy in Egremont, Cumbria, England

== See also ==
- Wyndham Hills, Pennsylvania, a suburb of York, Pennsylvania, US
- Windham (disambiguation)
- Wymondham, a town in Norfolk, England
- Wymondham, Leicestershire, a town in Leicestershire, England
