= Ellenbrae =

Pastoral lease in Western Australia

Coordinates: 15.958°S 127.064°E

Location in Western Australia

Ellenbrae, also commonly referred to as Ellenbrae Station, is a pastoral lease that operates as a cattle station in Western Australia.

It is situated about 125 kilometres (78 mi) south of Wyndham and 260 kilometres (162 mi) north of Halls Creek not far off the Gibb River Road. The Durack River runs through a portion of the property. It lies on land that was traditionally occupied by the Wardia clan of the Wurla indigenous people.

The property occupies an area of 4,047 square kilometres (1,563 sq mi), and also operates as a tourist resort during the dry season.

The Terry family purchased the property in 1983, and it was managed by their sons Byrne and Edward Terry for a period of time. Later, Byrne Terry and his wife took over management of Ellenbrae Station, diversifying it for tourism and allowing travellers to stay in onsite cabins. Byrne was a pastoralist who worked to raise ecological awareness of the land. He was also an artist. Using natural Australian materials, he hand-made a number of furniture and wall décor pieces for the property, as well as fashioning a bathtub feature built into a 1000 year old boab tree. Byrne died unexpectedly at 41 years of age in 2001. During the 1990s the area was plagued by successive bushfires, with the herd of cattle dropping from 10,000 head to 3,000.

The property was later purchased by Rino and Diana Grollo from Melbourne, who still own it.

In 2008 the pastoral manager was Susan Bradley and the station managers were Brian and Marcia Withell, who were originally from New Zealand and took over running the property in 2005.

A station employee was killed during the muster in 2010 when the helicopter he was piloting crashed and burst into flames.

== See also ==
- List of ranches and stations
