= Chamberlain River =

River in Kimberley region of Western Australia

Coordinates: 15°58′13″S 127°55′31″E

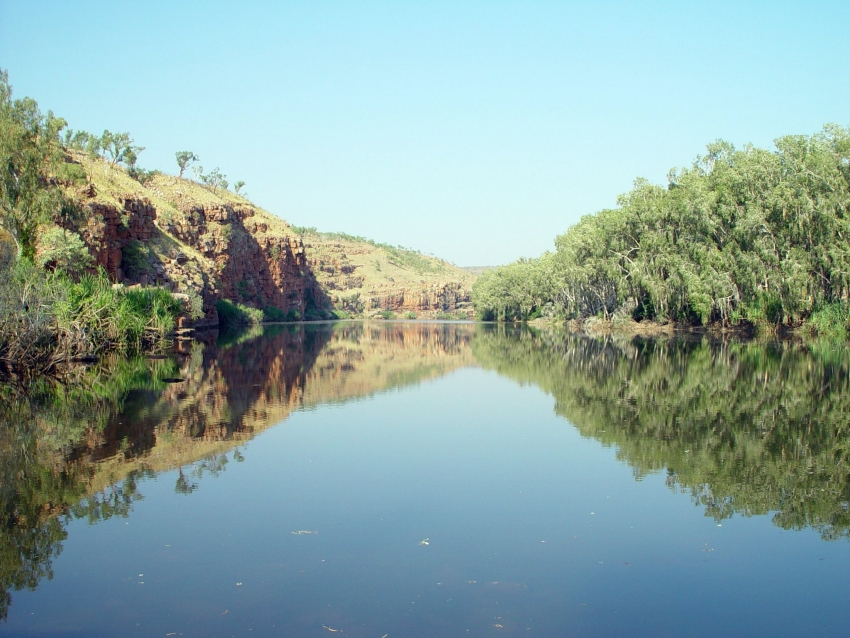

Location
- Country: Australia

Physical characteristics
- Source
  - location: Durack Range
  - elevation: 536 metres (1,759 ft)
- Mouth
  - location: Pentecost River
  - elevation: 76 metres (249 ft)
- Length: 236 km (147 mi)

The Chamberlain River is a river in the Kimberley region of Western Australia.

The headwaters of the river rise in the Durack Range near Yulumbu. The river flows in a northerly direction along the range until it merges with the Pentecost River near El Questro Station.

The traditional owners of the area are the Kitja people.

The river was named in 1901 by the surveyor Frederick Brockman. The river was named after Fremantle shipbuilder and Broome Pearler William Alfred Chamberlain.
