= Home Valley Station =

Pastoral lease in Western Australia

Coordinates: 15°43′25″S 127°49′51″E

Location in Western Australia

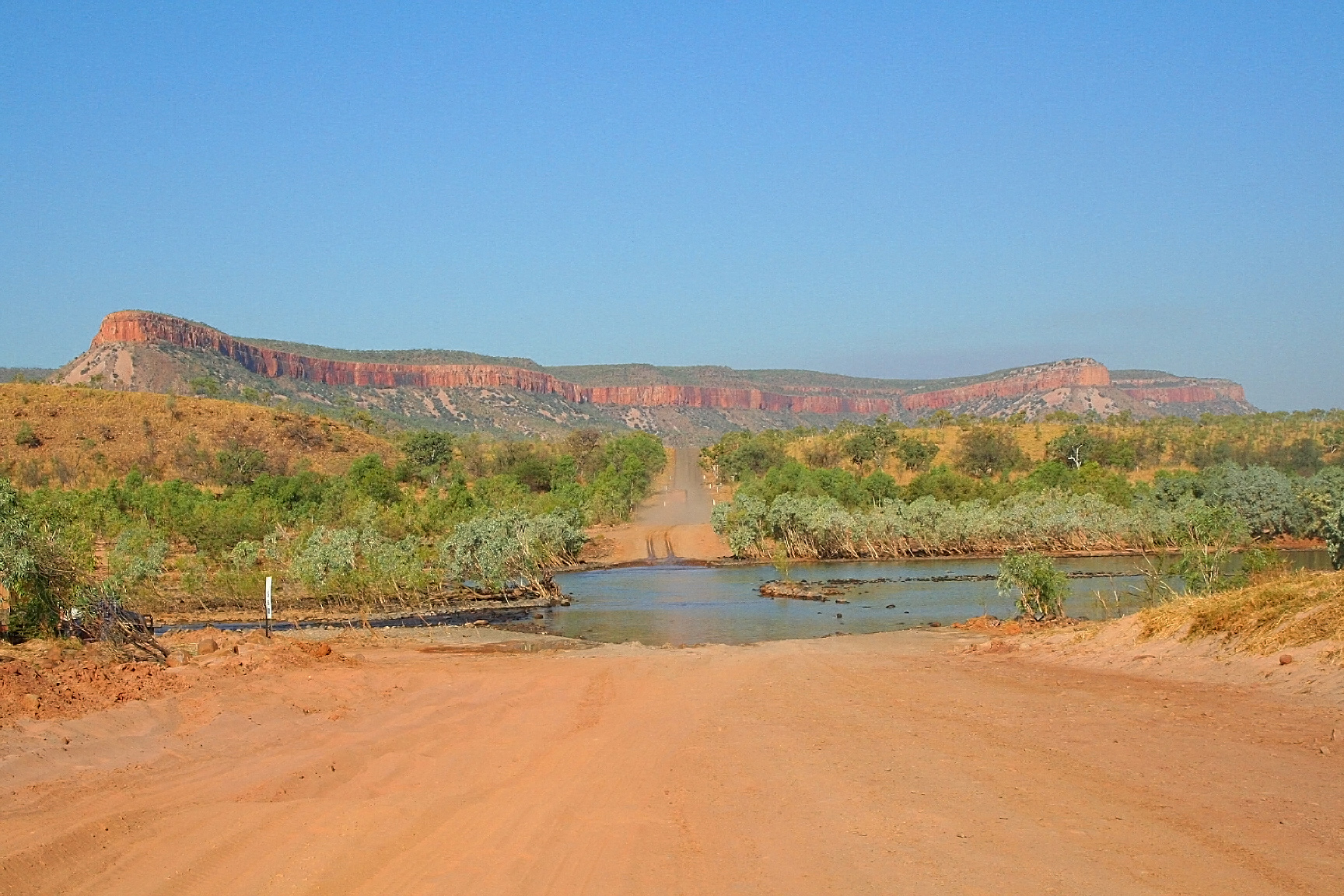
Pentecost River borders the property

Home Valley or Home Valley Station is a pastoral lease and cattle station in Western Australia.

== Location ==
It is located along the Gibb River Road 114 kilometres (71 mi) west of Kununurra in the Kimberley region.

== History ==
The pastoral lease is currently owned by the Indigenous Land Corporation along with nearby Karunjie Station and Durack River Station, which together cover an area of 3,500,000 acres (1,416,400 ha). Home Valley covers a total area of 1,400,000 hectares (3,459,475 acres) and is bordered to the east by the Pentecost River from its neighbour El Questro Station. The station is also known as HV8, which is the station's brand, and many of the signage to the station uses the HV8 logo.

Coming into existence in 1957 the pastoral lease was taken up by when Harold MacNamara left Mabel Downs, which he had been managing for the Naughtons family. The area had a poor reputation and, along with El Questro Station, was known as the underworld as a result of the large amount of theft of unbranded calves. MacNamara then sold up to Kevin Stansby, including 700 head of cattle, and returned to work for the Naughtons on Texas Downs. Stansby later sold to General Development Corporation, based in Perth in 1972.

An upgrade was planned for the airstrip in 2005 when A$96,350 was allocated so that so it could be brought up to Royal Flying Doctor Service night landing standard as part of the Regional Airports Development Scheme implemented by the Gallop government. The station has been open for tourism since 2006 and offers a range of accommodation to visitors; following a major renovation in 2008 it was converted to a holiday resort. The accommodation and homestead overlook Bindoola Creek, which is lined with boab trees and has views of the Cockburn Range.

Parts of the station were featured in the film Australia as the fictional property Faraway Downs, particularly through the cattle drive scene.

== See also ==
- List of ranches and stations
- List of the largest stations in Australia
