= Acacia setulifera =

Conservation status
- Priority One — Poorly Known Taxa (DEC)

Scientific classification
- Kingdom: Plantae
- Clade: Tracheophytes
- Clade: Angiosperms
- Clade: Eudicots
- Clade: Rosids
- Order: Fabales
- Family: Fabaceae
- Subfamily: Caesalpinioideae
- Clade: Mimosoid clade
- Genus: Acacia
- Species: A. setulifera

Binomial name
- Acacia setulifera Benth.
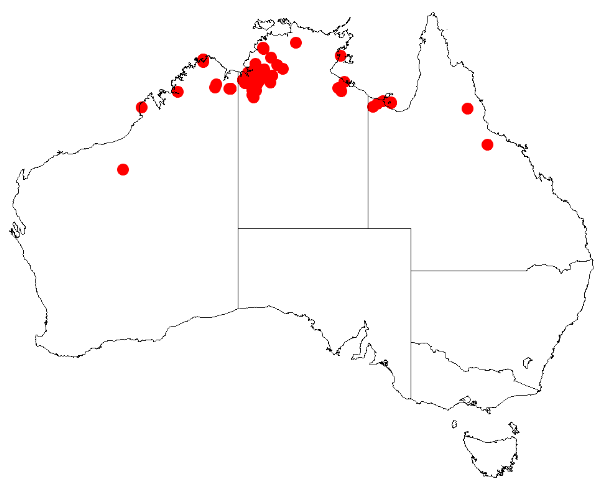
- Occurrence data from AVH

Species of legume

Acacia setulifera is a shrub of the genus Acacia and the subgenus Plurinerves that is endemic to an area of northern Australia.

== Description ==
The bushy, dense and resinous shrub typically grows to a height of 0.3 to 1 metre (1 to 3 ft) and produces bright yellow flowers. It can have a rounded and often procumbent habit with glabrous and resinous branchlets that are apically angular and have coarse ridges. Like most species of Acacia it has phyllodes rather than true leaves. The phyllodes have an elliptic or ovate shape and are often slightly curved and undulate, 0.3 to 0.6 centimetres (0.1 to 0.2 in) long, 1.5 to 3 millimetres (0.1 to 0.1 in) wide. It flowers throughout the year producing spherical flower-heads with a diameter of 5 to 8 mm (0.20 to 0.31 in) containing 15 to 26 bright yellow coloured flowers. The erect seed pods that form after flowering have a narrowly oblanceolate shape with straight sides with a length of 2.5 to 5 cm (0.98 to 1.97 in) and a width of 4 to 6 mm (0.16 to 0.24 in).

== Distribution ==
It is native to an area in the Northern Territory and the Kimberley region of Western Australia. The range of the plant extends around south of Kununurra in the Carr Boyd Range in the eastern Kimberley as well as in the Victoria River district in the top end of the Northern Territory where it is commonly situated on and around sandstone escarpments or ridges as a part of open Eucalyptus or Terminalia woodland communities.

== See also ==
- List of Acacia species
