= Acacia stipulosa =

Scientific classification
- Kingdom: Plantae
- Clade: Tracheophytes
- Clade: Angiosperms
- Clade: Eudicots
- Clade: Rosids
- Order: Fabales
- Family: Fabaceae
- Subfamily: Caesalpinioideae
- Clade: Mimosoid clade
- Genus: Acacia
- Species: A. stipulosa

Binomial name
- Acacia stipulosa F.Muell.
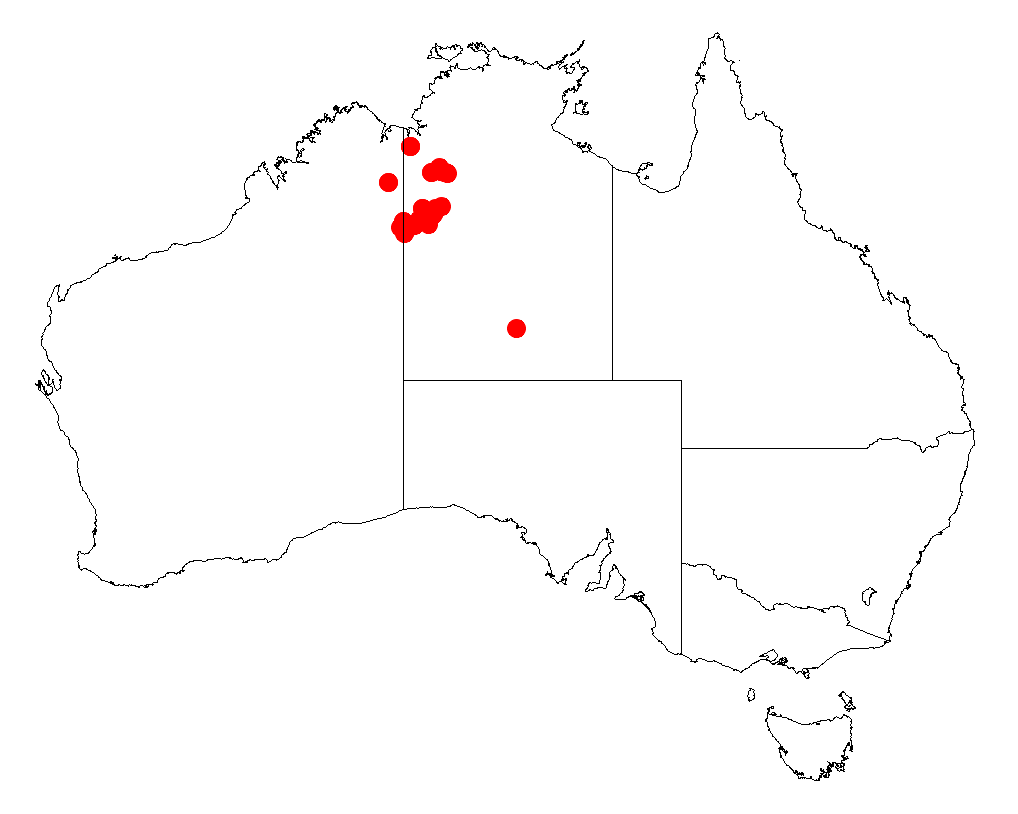
- Occurrence data from AVH

Species of legume

Acacia stipulosa is a shrub of the genus Acacia and the subgenus Plurinerves that is endemic to the area of northern Australia.

== Description ==
The viscid prickly shrub typically grows to a height of 2 metres (7 ft) and has cylindrical branchlets covered with stiff hairs and persistent stipules with a length of about 4 mm (0.16 in). Like most species of Acacia it has phyllodes rather than true leaves. The evergreen, leathery, crowded and ascending phyllodes have an inequilaterally broadly elliptic or triangular shape with a length of 4 to 8 mm (0.16 to 0.31 in) and a width of 2 to 5 mm (0.079 to 0.197 in) and have three or four, or occasionally more slightly raised distant nerves. It blooms in July and produces yellow flowers. The simple inflorescences occur singly in the axils and have more or less spherical flower-heads with a diameter of 8 to 10 mm (0.31 to 0.39 in) containing 30 to 40 golden coloured flowers. Following flowering crustaceous seed pods form that have a linear shape but are slightly raised over each of the seeds and can be straight to curved with a length up to around 8 cm (3.1 in) and a width of 5 to 9 mm (0.20 to 0.35 in). The seeds inside are arranged obliquely and have an elliptic shape with a length of about 4 mm (0.16 in) with an apical aril.

== Taxonomy ==
The species was first formally described by the botanist Ferdinand von Mueller in 1859 as a part of the work Contributiones ad Acaciarum Australiae Cognitionem as published in the Journal of the Proceedings of the Linnean Society.It was reclassified by Leslie Pedley in 1987 as Racosperma stipulosum then transferred back to genus Acacia in 2001.

== Distribution ==
It is native to an area in the Northern Territory and Kimberley region of Western Australia where it found growing in sandy soils over sandstone. The range of the plant extends from the far easter Kimberley in the west to the upper area of the Victoria River near Winnecke Creek and near Gardiner Range in the northern Territory where it is often a part of shrubland or woodland communities.

== See also ==
- List of Acacia species
