= Charles Wyndham =

Charles Wyndham or Windham may refer to:

== Politicians ==
- Charles Wyndham, 2nd Earl of Egremont (1710–1763), British peer and MP
- Charles William Wyndham (1760–1828), English MP for Midhurst 1790–95, New Shoreham 1795–1802, and Sussex 1807–1812
- Charles Wyndham (1796–1866), English Member of Parliament (MP) for West Sussex 1841–1847
- Charles Wyndham, 3rd Baron Leconfield (1872–1952), British peer
- Sir Charles Wyndham (1638–1706), MP for Southampton 1679–89 and 1689–98 and St Ives 1698–1701
- Sir Charles Ash Windham (1810–1870), British Army officer and MP
- Charles Edwin (died 1801), born Charles Wyndham, MP for Glamorgan 1780–89

== Others ==
- Charles Wyndham (actor) (1837–1919), British actor (who assumed the name)

== See also ==
- Wyndham (disambiguation)
