= Acacia asperulacea =

Scientific classification
- Kingdom: Plantae
- Clade: Tracheophytes
- Clade: Angiosperms
- Clade: Eudicots
- Clade: Rosids
- Order: Fabales
- Family: Fabaceae
- Subfamily: Caesalpinioideae
- Clade: Mimosoid clade
- Genus: Acacia
- Species: A. asperulacea

Binomial name
- Acacia asperulacea F.Muell.
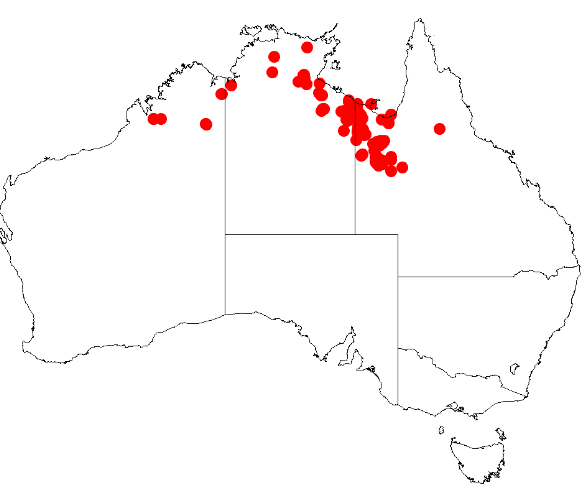
- Occurrence data from AVH

Synonyms
- ? Acacia galioides f. denudata Domin; ? Acacia galioides f. hirsutiuscula Domin; Acacia galioides var. asperulacea (F.Muell.) Domin nom. illeg., nom. superfl.; Acacia lycopodifolia var. glabrescens Benth. orth. var.; Acacia lycopodiifolia var. glabrescens Benth.; Racosperma asperulaceum (F.Muell.) Pedley

Species of legume

Acacia asperulacea is a species of flowering plant in the family Fabaceae and is endemic to northern Australia. It is a shrub with phyllodes arranged in whorls, heads of yellow flowers and sessile pods up to 35 mm (1.4 in) long.

== Description ==
Acacia asperulacea is a small spreading shrub that typically grows to a height of 0.2–1 m (7.9 in – 3 ft 3.4 in). Its phyllodes are arranged in whorls of 10 to 14, with internodes often up to three times as long. Each phyllode is slightly flattened, straight or slightly curved on the end, 5–8 mm (0.20–0.31 in) long with a small point on the end. The flowers are yellow, arranged in heads of 15 to 30 on a peduncle 10–25 mm (0.39–0.98 in) long. Flowering occurs from March to August and the pods are linear, sessile, 30–35 mm (1.2–1.4 in) long and about 6 mm (0.24 in) wide and glabrous with thickened margins containing seeds 3 mm (0.12 in) long.

A. asperulacea typically lives to an age of 11 to 20 years and is able to produce seeds after three years.

== Taxonomy ==
Acacia asperulacea was first formally described in 1859 by the botanist Ferdinand von Mueller in the Journal of the Proceedings of the Linnean Society, Botany from specimens collected on a sandstone tableland in Arnhem Land and near the Victoria River in the Northern Territory. The specific epithet (asperulacea) means 'resembling slightly rough', referring to the hairs on some pairs of the plant.

== Distribution and habitat ==
This species of wattle grows in shallow, stony soils and is found from the eastern Kimberley region of Western Australia through the north of the Northern Territory to far north-western Queensland.

== See also ==
- List of Acacia species
