= Cape Dussejour =

Point in Western Australia

Coordinates: 14°44′20″S 128°12′30″E

Cape Dussejour is located at the western side of the entrance to the Cambridge Gulf in the Kimberley region of Western Australia.

The Cape to the south east, on the eastern side of the mouth, is Cape Domett, with Lacrosse Island located between them.

Cape Dussejour was named after Achille Pierre Dionis du Sejour by Nicolas Baudin. It was previously named Cape Berquin in the 1801–1803 French expedition.
