= Worla =

Indigenous people of Western Australia

The Wurla, also written Ola, or Waladjangarri, are an Aboriginal Australian people of the Kimberley region of Western Australia.

== Name ==
Though often written Ola, Wurla is now considered the recommended transcription for this tribal ethnonym.

They are also known under a number of alternative names:

- Wo:la, Wola, Wula
- Waladjangari, Woladjangari
- Woolaja
- Walandjari
- Wolmardai
- Waringari (of Ngarinjin, an exonym, also applied to the Gija, implying cannibalistic practices)
- Oladjau (Miriwung exonym for several peoples who spoke varieties of the Ngarinyin language)
- Ngarangari, Ngalangari, Ngaiangari ("those who dwell on the tops of the range")
- Wardia

== Country ==
Norman Tindale estimated their tribal grounds as extending over about 7,800 square miles (20,000 km^{2}). The Wurlu occupied the northern side of the Wunaamin Miliwundi Range. They lay east of the Isdell Range, and their reach extended northwards as far as the Phillips Range and the headwaters of the Hann and upper Fitzroy rivers. To the east, their territory ran up to Bluff Face Range, in a line that linked directly Elgee Cliffs and the Burramundy Range. According to information gathered by Joseph Birdsell, the Wurla in penetrated down the Chapman and Durack Rivers to Karunjie severed the traditional links between the Ngarinjin and Gija.

== Social organisation ==
The Wurla were divided into clans.

- Wardia, a Wurla horde resident around Ellenbrae

== Sources ==
- "AIATSIS map of Indigenous Australia". AIATSIS. 14 May 2024.
- McGregor, William B. (2013). The Languages of the Kimberley, Western Australia. Routledge. ISBN 978-1-134-39602-3.
- "Tindale Tribal Boundaries" (PDF). Department of Aboriginal Affairs, Western Australia. September 2016. Archived from the original (PDF) on 8 March 2016.
- Tindale, Norman Barnett (1974). "Ola (WA)". Aboriginal Tribes of Australia: Their Terrain, Environmental Controls, Distribution, Limits, and Proper Names. Australian National University. ISBN 978-0-708-10741-6. Archived from the original on 20 March 2020.
