= Cape Domett =

Point in Western Australia

Coordinates: 14°49′S 128°23′E

Cape Domett is at the eastern side of the mouth of the Cambridge Gulf in the Kimberley region of Western Australia.

It is opposite Cape Dussejour, which lies to the north west of Cape Domett, with Lacrosse Island located between the capes.

In 1975 it was considered for the location of a bulk sugar terminal for the Ord River sugar industry.
