= Wyndham, Western Australia =

Town in the Kimberley region of Western Australia

Wyndham
- Town
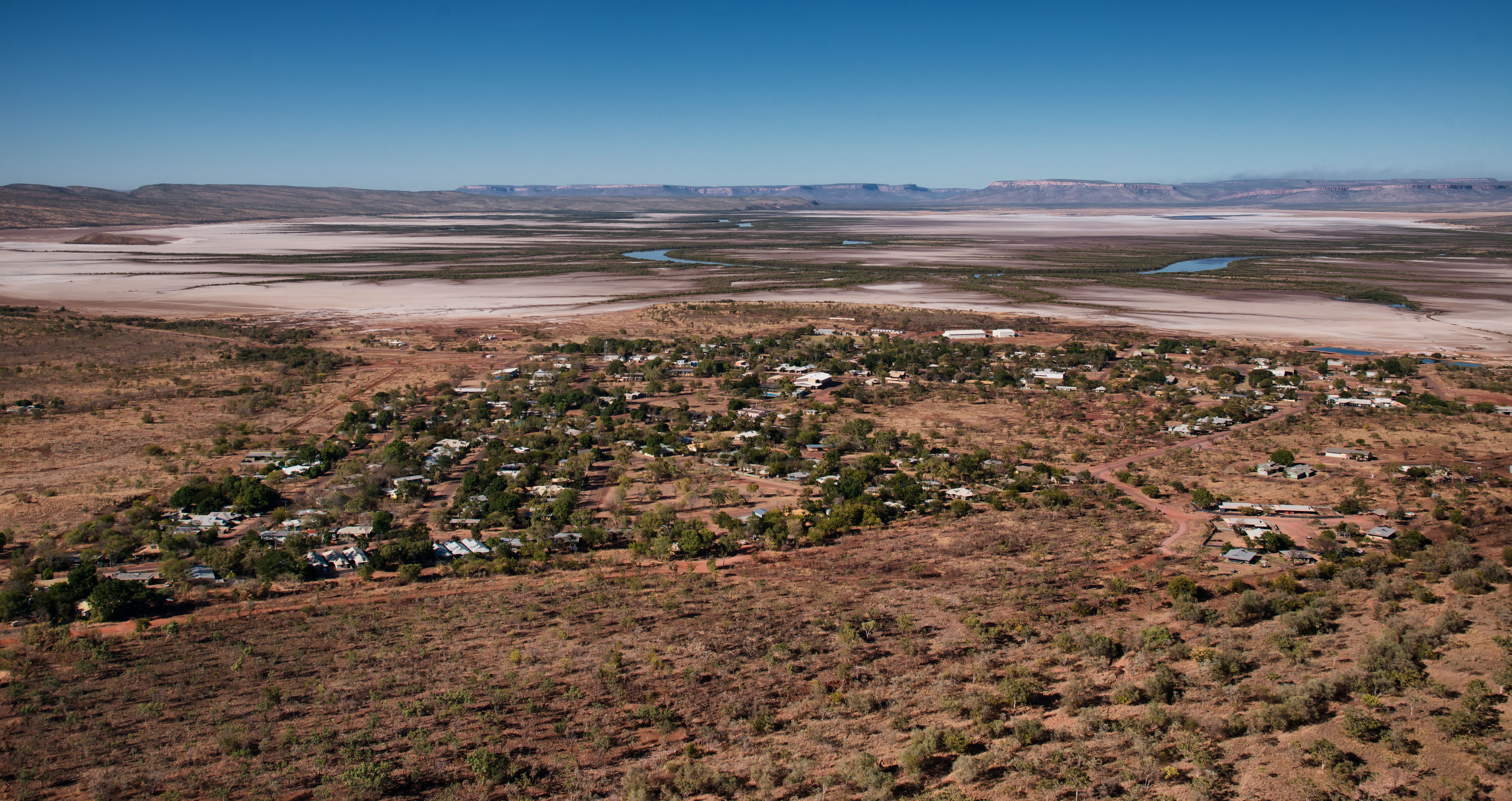
- Wyndham's Three Mile area, looking south to the King River

- Interactive map of Wyndham
- Coordinates: 15°28′57″S 128°7′22″E
- Country: Australia
- State: Western Australia
- LGA: Shire of Wyndham-East Kimberley
- Location: 3,315 km (2,060 mi) NNE of Perth; 928 km (577 mi) SW of Darwin; 101 km (63 mi) NW of Kununurra; 911 km (566 mi) ENE of Broome
- Established: 1886

Government
  - State electorate: Kimberley
  - Federal division: Durack

Area
  - Total: 936.1 km^{2} (361.4 sq mi)
- Elevation: 11 m (36 ft)

Population
  - Total: 745 (UCL 2021)
- Postcode: 6740
- Mean max temp: 36.1 °C (97.0 °F)
- Mean min temp: 22.3 °C (72.1 °F)
- Annual rainfall: 903.6 mm (35.57 in)

Wyndham is the northernmost town in the Kimberley region of Western Australia, 3,315 kilometres (2,060 mi) northeast of Perth via the Great Northern Highway. It was established in 1886 to service a new goldfield at Halls Creek, and it is now a port and service centre for the east Kimberley region with a population of 941 as of the 2021 census. Aboriginal and Torres Strait Islander people make up 54% of the population. Wyndham comprises two areas - the original town site at Wyndham Port situated on Cambridge Gulf, and 5 kilometres (3.1 mi) by road to the south, the Three Mile area with the residential and shopping area for the port, also founded in 1886. Wyndham is part of the Shire of Wyndham-East Kimberley.

== History ==
Aboriginal Australians in chains at Wyndham prison, c.1901

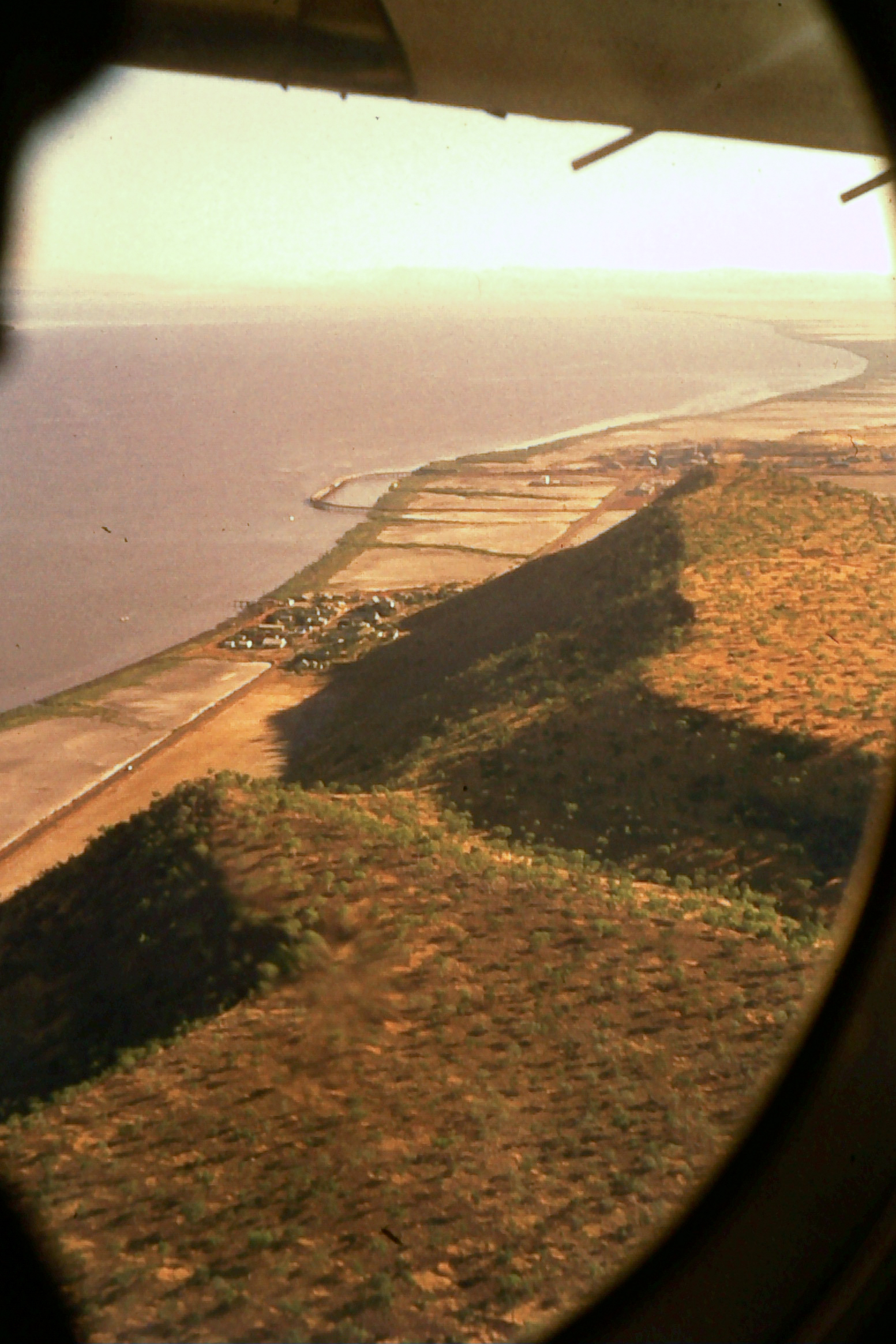
Wyndham Port from the air, 1962

Wyndham is within traditional Doolboong country.

The first European to visit the area was Phillip Parker King in 1819. He was instructed to find a river "likely to lead to an interior navigation into the great continent". He sailed into Cambridge Gulf, which he named after the Duke of Cambridge, and then sailed up a river which was subsequently named after him. Finding no fresh water on the mudflats, he departed.

Wyndham was established on 14 April 1886, by government resident and warden Charles Danvers Price, who led a party including commissioner of crown lands John Forrest on the Adelaide Steamship Company mail steamer SS Albany.

Price selected Wyndham as the name for the new town, after Walter George Wyndham, the young stepson of the governor of Western Australia Sir Frederick Napier Broome.

By late 1886, the town was booming and accommodated at least three licensed hotels at the port, the Wyndham Hotel, the Custom House Hotel, and the Queensland Hotel located along O’Donnell Street. The Wyndham Hotel was a substantial two storey building. Hospitality infrastructure extended beyond the port, with taverns established at both Three Mile Camp and Twenty Mile Camp, supporting the movement of travellers and miners. The town also featured stores, bootmakers’ and butchers’ shops, a billiard room, a soda water factory, commission agencies, auctioneers, and other businesses. Ships brought in at least five thousand miners, who headed off to the Halls Creek goldfields. During this boom there were times when up to 16 vessels were moored in Cambridge Gulf.

However, by 1888, the gold rush at Halls Creek had ended and the fortunes of Wyndham declined. It became a tiny settlement serving the pastoral interests in the East Kimberley. By 1912, money had virtually disappeared from the Wyndham economy, and purchases were paid for using promissory notes known as "shinplasters".

In 1942, during World War II, the town and its aerodrome were attacked on four occasions by Japanese aircraft.

Wyndham's significance as a service centre was crucial for the construction of the Ord River Diversion Dam and the town of Kununurra in the early 1960s. With the rise of Kununurra as a larger population centre, the significance of Wyndham as a service centre had diminished by the 1980s. Wyndham has regained significance as the port for the region with new mines shipping ore from the port.

== Wyndham Meatworks ==
In 1913, the Western Australian government started to construct the Wyndham Meatworks to restart the town's economy. The construction efforts were interrupted by the Nevanas affair and World War I, but the meatworks were completed in 1919 to a design by William Hardwick, who later became the Principal Architect of Western Australia. The meatworks were the mainstay of the town's economy until their closure in 1985; the town also supported the Air Beef Scheme, which ran from 1947 to 1965.

== Geography ==
Wyndham is on the eastern side of Cambridge Gulf, an inlet of Joseph Bonaparte Gulf in the Timor Sea. It is surrounded by the Durack, Pentecost and King rivers to the south, Forrest River to the west and Ord River to the north. Much of the land around Wyndham is inhospitable, and includes the Bastion Range and the mudflats of the Cambridge Gulf. The Bastion Range is the site of the 28-square-kilometre (11 sq mi) Wyndham Important Bird Area, identified as such by BirdLife International because it holds the largest known population of endangered Gouldian finches.

== Climate ==
Wyndham experiences a hot semi-arid climate (Köppen climate classification BSh), being a little too dry to be classified as a tropical savanna climate (Aw), with a wet season from late November to March and a dry season from April to early November. The hottest month is November with an average maximum temperature of 40.0 °C (104.0 °F), and the coolest month is June with an average maximum of 31.5 °C (88.7 °F). The annual average maximum temperature is 36.1 °C (97.0 °F), one of the highest in Australia. In 1946, Wyndham recorded 333 consecutive days of temperatures over 32 °C (90 °F). The wet season is very humid with the average dewpoint temperature at 3pm in February being 22.4 °C (72.3 °F). In the dry season, in August, it is 8.3 °C (46.9 °F).

Large rain events do occur in Wyndham, such as on 4 March 1919 when 318 millimetres (12.5 in) of rain were recorded over a 24-hour period, followed by another 117 millimetres (4.6 in) the next day.

Climate data for Wyndham Aero, elevation 4 m (13 ft), (2000–2020 normals, extremes 2000–present)
Month	Jan	Feb	Mar	Apr	May	Jun	Jul	Aug	Sep	Oct	Nov	Dec	Year
Record high °C (°F)	44.0 (111.2)	43.2 (109.8)	43.9 (111.0)	41.4 (106.5)	39.4 (102.9)	37.3 (99.1)	38.1 (100.6)	40.6 (105.1)	42.0 (107.6)	45.1 (113.2)	44.9 (112.8)	45.8 (114.4)	45.8 (114.4)
Mean daily maximum °C (°F)	36.4 (97.5)	36.1 (97.0)	36.3 (97.3)	36.9 (98.4)	34.1 (93.4)	31.5 (88.7)	32.1 (89.8)	34.0 (93.2)	37.8 (100.0)	39.6 (103.3)	40.0 (104.0)	38.1 (100.6)	36.1 (96.9)
Mean daily minimum °C (°F)	26.2 (79.2)	26.0 (78.8)	25.7 (78.3)	23.5 (74.3)	19.2 (66.6)	15.9 (60.6)	15.3 (59.5)	16.1 (61.0)	21.5 (70.7)	24.8 (76.6)	26.7 (80.1)	26.7 (80.1)	22.3 (72.2)
Record low °C (°F)	20.9 (69.6)	21.7 (71.1)	19.0 (66.2)	13.8 (56.8)	8.9 (48.0)	6.0 (42.8)	5.1 (41.2)	7.4 (45.3)	10.7 (51.3)	15.5 (59.9)	18.4 (65.1)	21.0 (69.8)	5.1 (41.2)
Average rainfall mm (inches)	218.2 (8.59)	221.3 (8.71)	140.3 (5.52)	29.0 (1.14)	11.5 (0.45)	5.3 (0.21)	0.2 (0.01)	0.0 (0.0)	1.0 (0.04)	20.3 (0.80)	56.8 (2.24)	199.7 (7.86)	903.6 (35.57)
Average rainy days (≥ 1.0 mm)	13.4	12.1	8.6	2.0	1.0	0.5	0.1	0.0	0.3	1.7	5.0	10.7	55.4
Source: Australian Bureau of Meteorology

== Facilities ==
=== Education ===
There are two schools, Wyndham District High School (K-12) and St Joseph's Catholic School (K-7), one TAFE campus, and a daycare centre.

=== Transport ===
Wyndham is served by Wyndham Airport. A circular tramway was built by the Public Works Department in conjunction with the meatworks to connect it to the town's goods shed jetty.

=== Community ===
The Wyndham Memorial Swimming Pool is a public swimming pool, opened on 5 November 1966 by Charles Court.

The Ted Birch Memorial Youth and Recreation Centre is a multi-purpose, community recreation facility. The centre, originally the Wyndham Recreation Centre, was opened on 11 October 2003 by the shire president Barbara Johnson. The Centre was renamed on 29 May 2014 in honour of Pastor Edward "Ted" Birch, who was instrumental in helping establish a youth service in Wyndham.

Peter Reid Memorial Hall is a community hall in Wyndham available for community events and private bookings. The hall, originally the Wyndham Hall, was built in 1982 and was later renamed the Peter Reid Memorial Hall in recognition of Peter Reid's service to the community by the Wyndham Lions Club, following his death in 1985.

The Wyndham Port Shire Hall is a historic building that was constructed in 1960 on the foundations of the original school and road board buildings from 1894. The Hall was also an office and administration building for the Shire of Wyndham-East Kimberley until the 27th July 1970 when a new administration building opened in Wyndham Three Mile. The Hall later became a recreation space until it was converted into an art gallery in 1997. The hall became known as the Boab Art Gallery and showcased artworks by local and regional artists. The Hall is now leased to a community group to support the conservation of the Gouldian finch, a rare and endangered bird species that live in the mangroves near Wyndham. The hall is also a part of a heritage walk of Wyndham Port.

Wyndham is also the home of the Big Crocodile, a wire and concrete statue of a crocodile around 18 metres (60 ft) long.

=== Tourism ===
For tourists, there are two hotels and a caravan park. The nearby Bastion lookout provides sweeping vistas of the surrounding country, including the Durack, Pentecost, King, Forrest and Ord Rivers, which emerge into the Cambridge Gulf. The town has a museum in the old courthouse that is open to the public and run by the Wyndham Historical Society. Nearby Wyndham is the Boab Prison Tree.

== Jirrawun Arts ==
Jirrawun Arts was an Indigenous Australian art centre, established in 1998 in Kununurra before moving to Wyndham in 2006. It was notable as the base for contemporary Indigenous Australian artists of the eastern Kimberley region, including Paddy Bedford and Freddie Timms. It closed in 2010. Their art was exhibited in exhibitions in Melbourne and elsewhere.

== In popular culture ==
The Wyndham area was a filming location for:

- The 1946 film The Overlanders
- The 1997 documentary film The Human Race
- The 2004 US reality TV series Outback Jack, at El Questro Station
- The 2007 Dutch reality TV series Outback Jack, at Home Valley Station
- The 2008 film Australia
- The 2010 film Mad Bastards, as the fictional town of Five Rivers
- The 2012 film Satellite Boy, in and around Wyndham
- The 2013 TV series Who Do You Think You Are?, Series 5 Episode 1, Rove McManus
- The 2018 TV series Mystery Road, as the fictional town of Patterson
