= Wyndham Important Bird Area =

Important Bird Area in Western Australia

Coordinates: 15°27′37″S 128°08′47″E

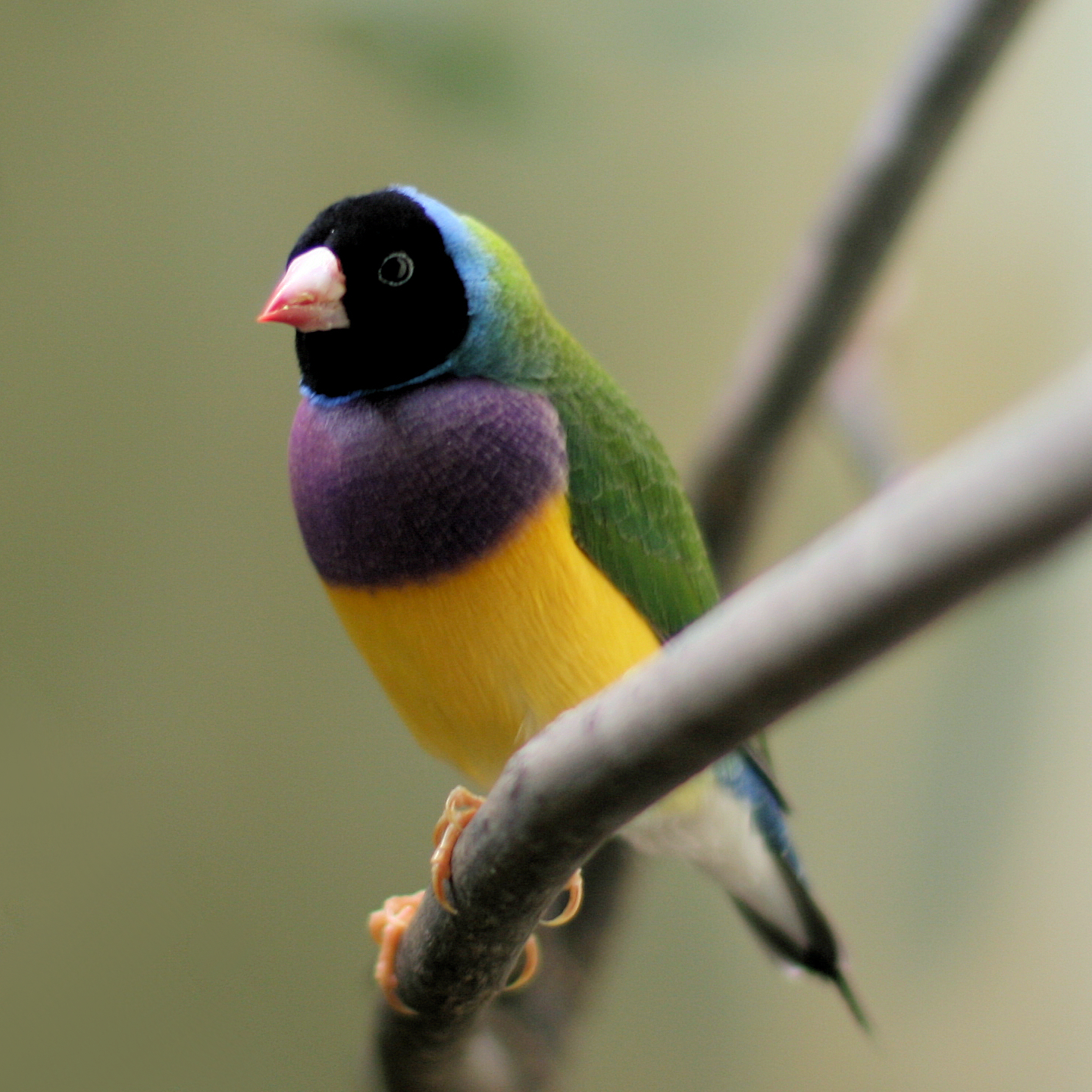
The IBA supports the largest known wild population of endangered Gouldian finches

The Wyndham Important Bird Area comprises a 28 km^{2} tract of land in the north-east of the Kimberley region of Western Australia. The site lies in the Bastion Hills close to the town of Wyndham, a port on the West Arm of the Cambridge Gulf. It is an important site for Gouldian finches.

== Description ==
The site is characterised by gently sloping ranges, vegetated with tropical savanna woodlands and grasslands, with sandstone outcrops. The woodland has a high density of cavity-bearing old-growth eucalypts suitable as finch nest-sites; the grassland provides food for the birds; and the proximity of Wyndham provides reliable sources of drinking water. The area has a tropical monsoon climate with a mean minimum temperature of 17 °C in July, a mean maximum of 40 °C in November, with the mean annual rainfall of 780 mm falling mainly from November to March.

== Birds ==
The site has been identified as an Important Bird Area (IBA) by BirdLife International because it supports the largest known population of endangered Gouldian finches. It also contains populations of, northern rosellas, white-gaped, yellow-tinted and bar-breasted honeyeaters, silver-crowned friarbirds, masked and long-tailed finches and yellow-rumped munias.

== Finch trapping ==
Eleven Estrildidae finch in the Family Ploceidae are distributed in the Kimberley region of Western Australia. Commercial finch trapping in the Kimberley, principally around Wyndham, commenced in 1897. By 1901 finches were trapped around Wyndham and shipped overseas to Europe in consignments of approximately 5,000 by the persons trapping them. All Kimberley finches were partially or fully protected from 1902 under the Western Australian Game Act, 1892. Commonwealth Customs regulations first introduced in 1911 failed to curb large scale exports by private finch traders until 1932. One of the largest commercial traders of wild caught Kimberley finches in the late 1920s and 1930s was the South Perth Zoo which exploited customs' law to export for 'scientific and educational purposes'. Licenses to trap finches in the Kimberley were first issued in or after 1913 and continued until 15 November 1986 when finch trapping was banned by Barry Hodge, the environment minister. Trapping of certain finches ceased before 1986: the yellow-rumped mannikin after 15 November 1975 because of its scarcity; the zebra finch after 15 November 1981 because sufficient numbers were sourced from breeding stocks; and the Gouldian finch after 15 November 1981 because of its decline in numbers. Customs regulations in 1960 prohibited the export of live Australian fauna for commercial purposes and strict standards were applied to exports of specimens of native fauna for scientific research or zoological display. In 1971 Australia became a signatory to the Convention on International Trade in Endangered Species (CITES) and in 1976 Australia introduced the Customs (Endangered Species) Regulations to enforce import and export of species covered by CITES.
