= Windham =

Windham is an English surname and may refer to:

== People ==
=== Surname ===
- Windham (surname)

=== Given name ===
- Windham Rotunda (1987–2023), American professional wrestler known as Bray Wyatt
- Windham William Sadler (1796–1824), Irish balloonist

== Place names ==
=== Canada ===
- Windham Township, Ontario, historic township in Norfolk County, Ontario, Canada

=== England ===
- Wymondham, Norfolk, occasionally written as Windham

=== United States ===
- Windham, Connecticut
- Windham County, Connecticut
- Windham, Iowa
- Windham, Maine
- Windham, Montana
- Windham, New Hampshire
- Windham (town), New York
  - Windham (CDP), New York, within the town of Windham
  - Windham Mountain, ski resort
- Windham, Ohio
- Windham Township, Portage County, Ohio
- Windham Township, Bradford County, Pennsylvania
- Windham Township, Wyoming County, Pennsylvania
- Windham, Vermont
- Windham County, Vermont
- Windhams Crossroads, South Carolina

== Ships ==
- British East Indiaman Windham (1800), later the Chilean ship Lautaro
- USS Windham Bay (CVE-92)
- USS Windham County (LST-1170)

== School districts ==
- Windham School District (New Hampshire), United States
- Windham School District (Texas), United States

== Other ==
- Windham Hill Records, a division of Sony Music Entertainment
- Windham Manor, Norfolk, England

== See also ==
- Wyndham (disambiguation)
- Wymondham, Norfolk
- Wymondham, Leicestershire
