= Lacrosse Island =

Island in Western Australia

Coordinates: 14.750°S 128.314°E

Lacrosse Island is an island in the Cambridge Gulf in the Kimberley region of Western Australia, located between Cape Domett on the eastern shore and Cape Dussejour on the western. The island is in the local government area of the Shire of Wyndham-East Kimberley.

It lies at the point where Cambridge Gulf and Joseph Bonaparte Gulf meet at the Medusa Banks, just north of the island. The south eastern end of the island is named "White Stone Point", with the north western end named "West Bluff".

During the Kimberley gold rush of the 1880s, a boat utilised Lacrosse Island as the staging point for the "Bendigo Party" to proceed to the Kimberley goldfield. Due to tidal ranges in the approach to Cambridge Gulf, careful note of the Lacrosse tidal range is needed.

In the 1920s visitors to the island sought out turtle eggs.

== Fauna ==
Lacrosse Island is an important nesting area for the flatback sea turtle.
