= Legune (Joseph Bonaparte Bay) Important Bird Area =

Coordinates: 15°04′52″S 129°23′45″E

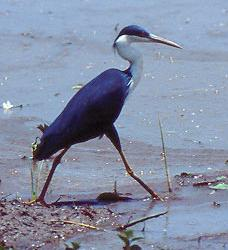
The IBA is important for pied herons

The Legune (Joseph Bonaparte Bay) Important Bird Area comprises a low-lying, swampy, floodplain peninsula at the south-eastern end of the Joseph Bonaparte Gulf in the Top End of the Northern Territory of Australia. The land is part of the Legune Station, a cattle station and pastoral lease.

== Description ==
The IBA lies between the estuaries of the Keep and Victoria Rivers, not far from the border with Western Australia. Much of the area consists of hypersaline mudflats, but there are also freshwater sedge swamps, seasonal grassy marshes, wooded swamps and lakes, with mangroves and mangrove-fringed channels.

== Birds ==
The site has been identified by BirdLife International as a 1391 km^{2} Important Bird Area (IBA) because it is believed to support over 1% of the world population of pied herons. More than 40,000 waterbirds have been recorded, mainly wandering whistling-ducks and various herons and egrets. Other birds recorded from the IBA in substantial numbers include magpie geese, Nankeen night herons, glossy and Australian white ibises, little black cormorants, intermediate egrets, Terek sandpipers, Eurasian coots and purple swamphens.
