= Cambridge Gulf =

Gulf in Kimberley region of Western Australia

Coordinates: 14°54′S 128°14′E

Location in Western Australia

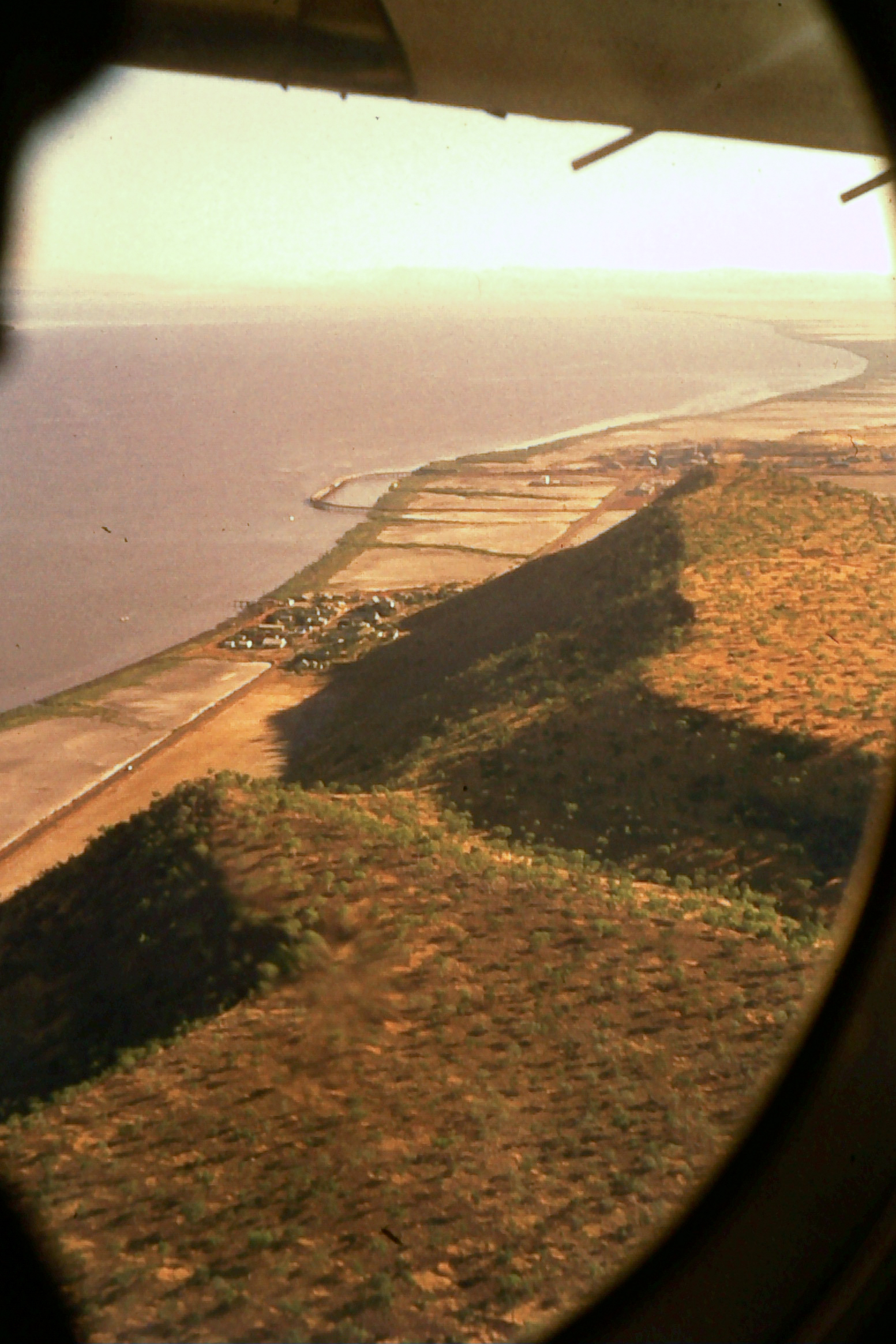
Wyndham on the eastern bank of the Gulf

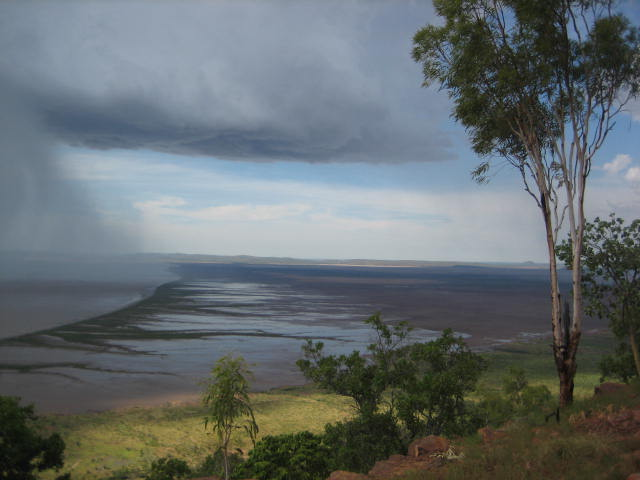
Bastion lookout, Wyndham, overlooking the Gulf

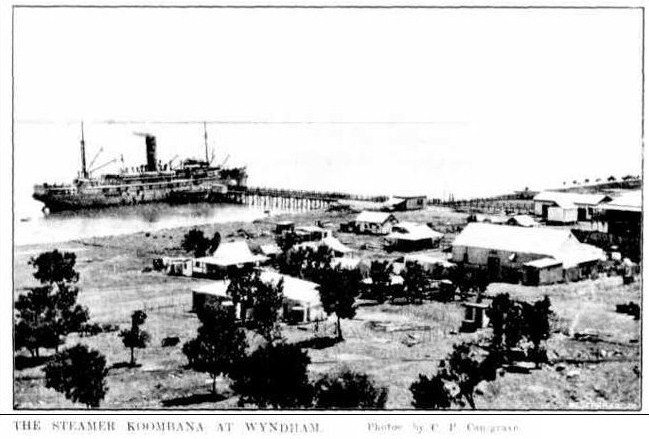
SS Koombana, Wyndham, c. 1911

Cambridge Gulf is a gulf on the north coast of the Kimberley region of Western Australia. Many rivers flow into the gulf, including the Ord River, Pentecost River, Durack River, King River and the Forrest River, making the environment an estuarine one.

The gulf experiences two large tidal flows each day between 7 and 9 metres (23 and 30 ft).

The town of Wyndham, the area's principal port, lies on its eastern bank at the lower part of the gulf and is approximately 100 kilometres (62 mi) by road west-north-west of Kununurra. Cambridge Gulf is a gulf within a gulf, being at the southern extremity of the Joseph Bonaparte Gulf, in the Timor Sea.

The entrance of the Gulf is defined by Cape Domett on the eastern shore, Lacrosse Island in the middle, and the Cape Dussejour on the western shore, with King Shoals and Medusa Banks out in Joseph Bonaparte Gulf beyond Lacrosse Island.

The conjunction between the gulf and the lower regions of the Ord River (the eastern arm), and the Durack and Pentecost Rivers (the western arm) are the main areas that have estuarine features.

== Description ==
The western shore of the gulf is backed by high sandstone hills that are 30 metres (98 ft) to 250 metres (820 ft) in height and with fringing colonies of mangroves and mudflats when the tide is low. Dense mangrove stands fringe the marshy area on the eastern shore of the gulf. Adolphus Island splits the southern end of the sound with a navigatable channel being found on the western arm.

== History ==
The traditional owners of the area are the Jeidji people.

On 17 September 1819 Philip Parker King on the survey cutter HMS Mermaid, who was mapping the entire north Australian coastline, landed at Lacrosse Island, from where he noticed a "deep opening" to the south.

Lacrosse Island is situated in the entrance of a deep opening trending to the South-South-West towards some steep rugged hills.

This "deep opening" described came to be known as the Cambridge Gulf in the days that followed. On 18 September 1819 King's journal states.

At last quarter ebb we got underweigh and proceeded to examine the opening by steering South-South-West towards the deepest part; at twenty-three miles from Lacrosse Island the gulf is divided by Adolphus Island into two arms; one of which trended to the South-South-East and the other to the South-South-West. As the western arm appeared to be of most importance we entered it and, with a strong flood tide, proceeded with great rapidity; as sunset approached we began to look for an anchorage, but found much difficulty on account of the strength of the tides, the great depth of water, and, as I at first thought, the unfavourable quality of the bottom: at last the anchor was dropped close to the south-west shore of Adolphus Island in the entrance of another arm which appeared to trend to the south-east under Mount Connexion.

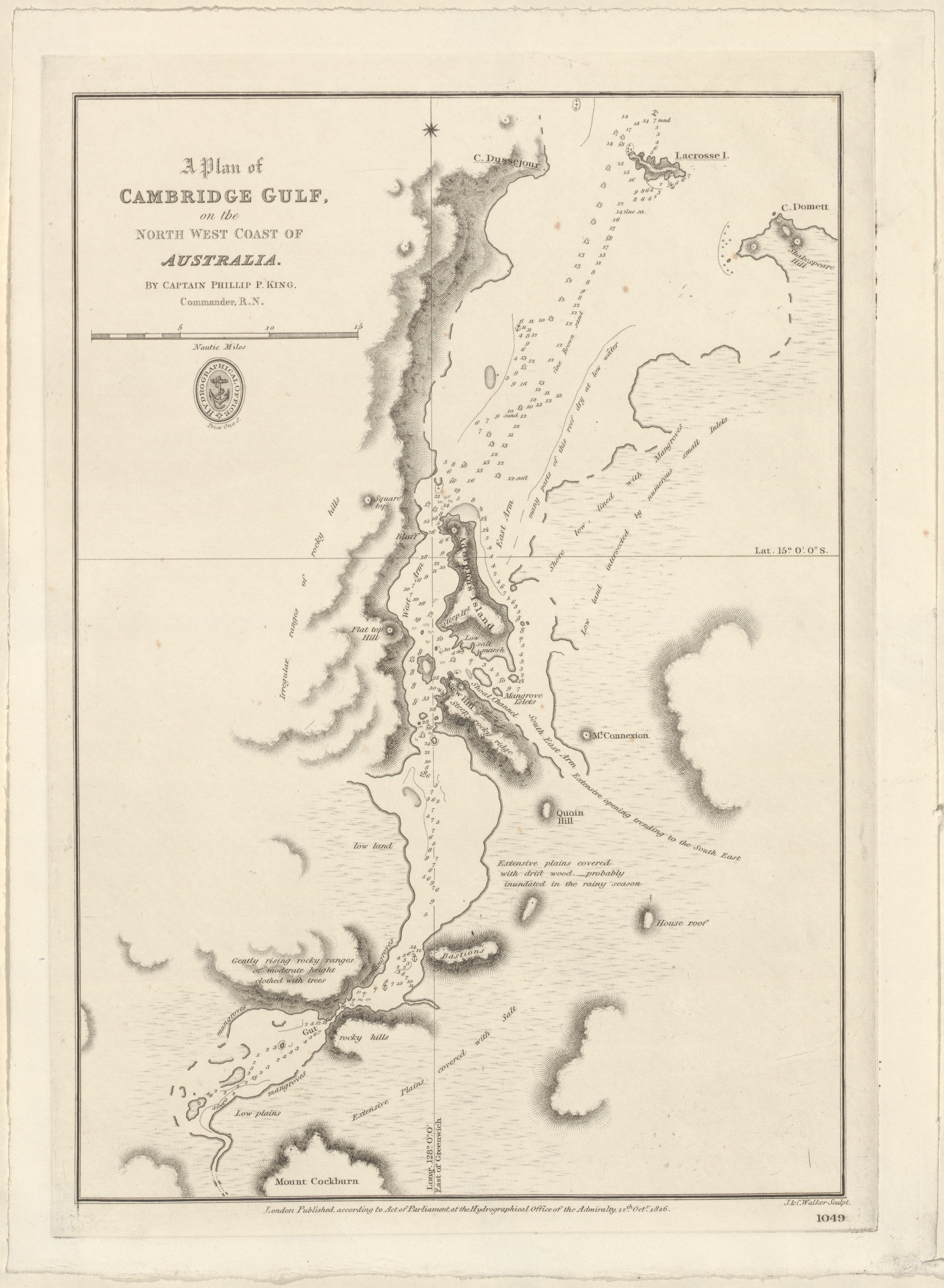
Phillip Parker King's Plan of Cambridge Gulf on the north west coast of Australia published in 1826

It would seem from the description that the "arm" mentioned in the last sentence, was the Ord River, which was not named for another 60 years. Mermaid spent many days during which King sighted, mapped and named the Cambridge Gulf, which was named after the Duke of Cambridge. However, having first spotted the "deep opening" of the gulf on 17 September 1819, then spending 12 days within it, King did not name the gulf in his journal until 29 September 1819 when he was leaving it. Adolphus Island too was named after him.

Alexander Forrest was the next European to explore the area in 1879. However, the closest he got was to the junction of the Ord River and the Negri River, near the WA/NT Border, both of these rivers being named by him. On 2 August 1879 Forrest records in his journal the following.

No-one can regret more than I do, that I am unable to follow this magnificent stream to its mouth, which I have no doubt will be found in Cambridge Gulf – the whole of its waters in that case being in Western Australian territory. I have named this river the Ord, after his excellency the Governor of Western Australia who has taken so great an interest in this expedition.

By late 1884 some of the first settlers had begun to arrive in the Kimberley, travelling overland. By early 1885 people were arriving at the Cambridge Gulf to move inland in search for gold around Halls Creek, before the port was named as Wyndham in 1886. During the 1886 gold rush up to sixteen vessels would be moored in the gulf waiting to dock.
