= King River (Kimberley, Western Australia) =

River in Western Australia

Coordinates: 15°29′37″S 128°4′12″E

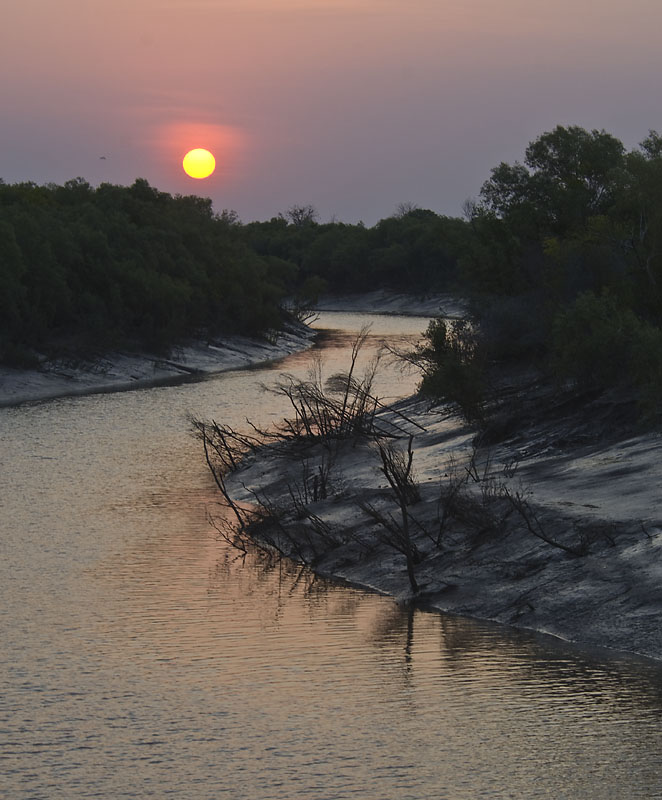
- Sunset over the King River as seen from the King River Road

Location
- Country: Australia

Physical characteristics
- Source
  - location: Durack Range
  - elevation: 387 metres (1,270 ft)
- Mouth
  - location: Cambridge Gulf
  - elevation: sea level
- Length: 132 km (82 mi)

The King River is a river in the Kimberley region of Western Australia.

The headwaters of the river rise between the Durack Range and the Saw Range. It flows southwards before turning north and continuing until it discharges into the West Arm of the Cambridge Gulf just south of Wyndham.

The river was named in 1884 during hydrographic surveys by Staff Commander James Coghlan after Captain Phillip Parker King, who was the first European to chart the river mouth in 1818.

The river flooded in 2005 following heavy rainfall when Cyclone Ingrid crossed the coast in the area. At Diggers Rest Station near Wyndham fences and livestock were swept away.

The Indigenous Australian name for the river is Goolime and traditional owners of the areas around the river are the Ngarinjin, for the area around its headwaters.
