= Robert Graff =

Australian botanical illustrator

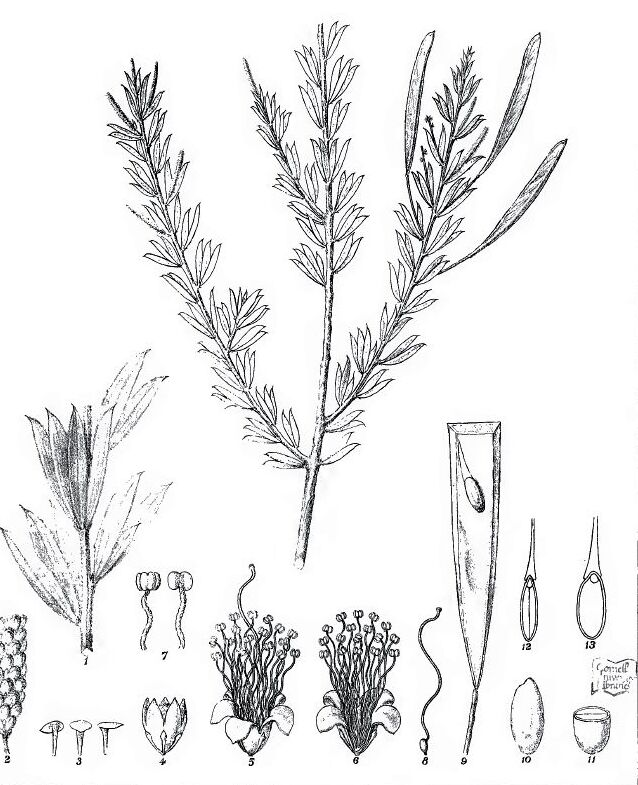
Acacia conjunctifolia from "Iconography of Australian species of Acacia and cognate genera"

Robert Graff (?1841-1914) was an Australian botanical illustrator and lithographer, who lived in Melbourne and illustrated a number of monographs for Ferdinand von Mueller, including "Iconography of Australian species of Acacia and cognate genera" (1887) and "Description and illustration of the Myoporinous Plants of Australia" (1886-1887).

Ferdinand von Mueller described his work "The original drawings for this work as well as their lithographic delineations emanated from the skilled talent of Mr. Robert Graff, and demonstrate patient perseverance as well as artistic accomplishment."
