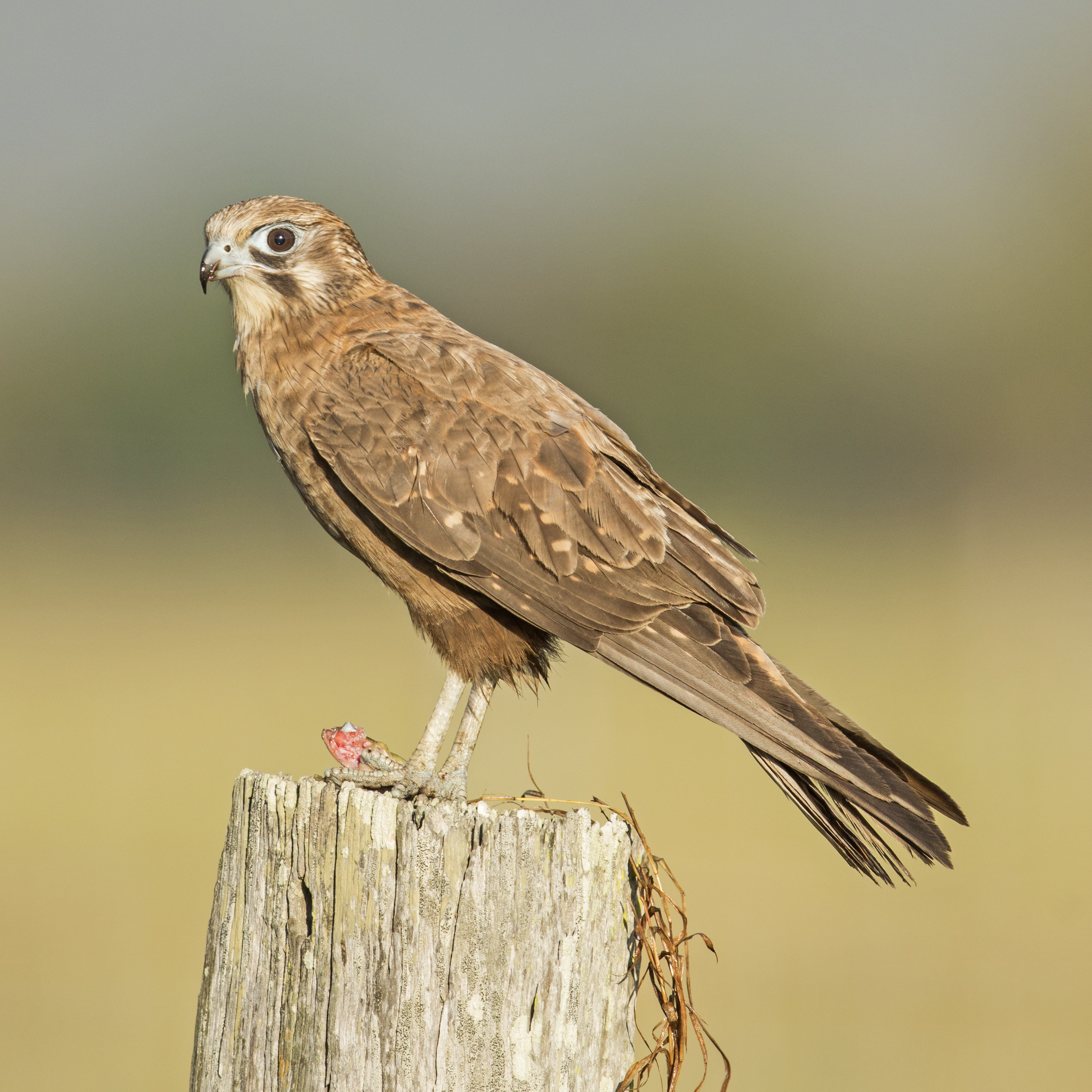
- At Ingham, Queensland, Australia

Conservation status
- Least Concern (IUCN 3.1)

Scientific classification
- Kingdom: Animalia
- Phylum: Chordata
- Class: Aves
- Order: Falconiformes
- Family: Falconidae
- Genus: Falco
- Species: F. berigora

Binomial name
- Falco berigora Vigors & Horsfield, 1827

Synonyms
- Asturaetus furcillatus De Vis, 1906; Plioaetus furcillatus (De Vis, 1906)

= Brown falcon =

Species of bird

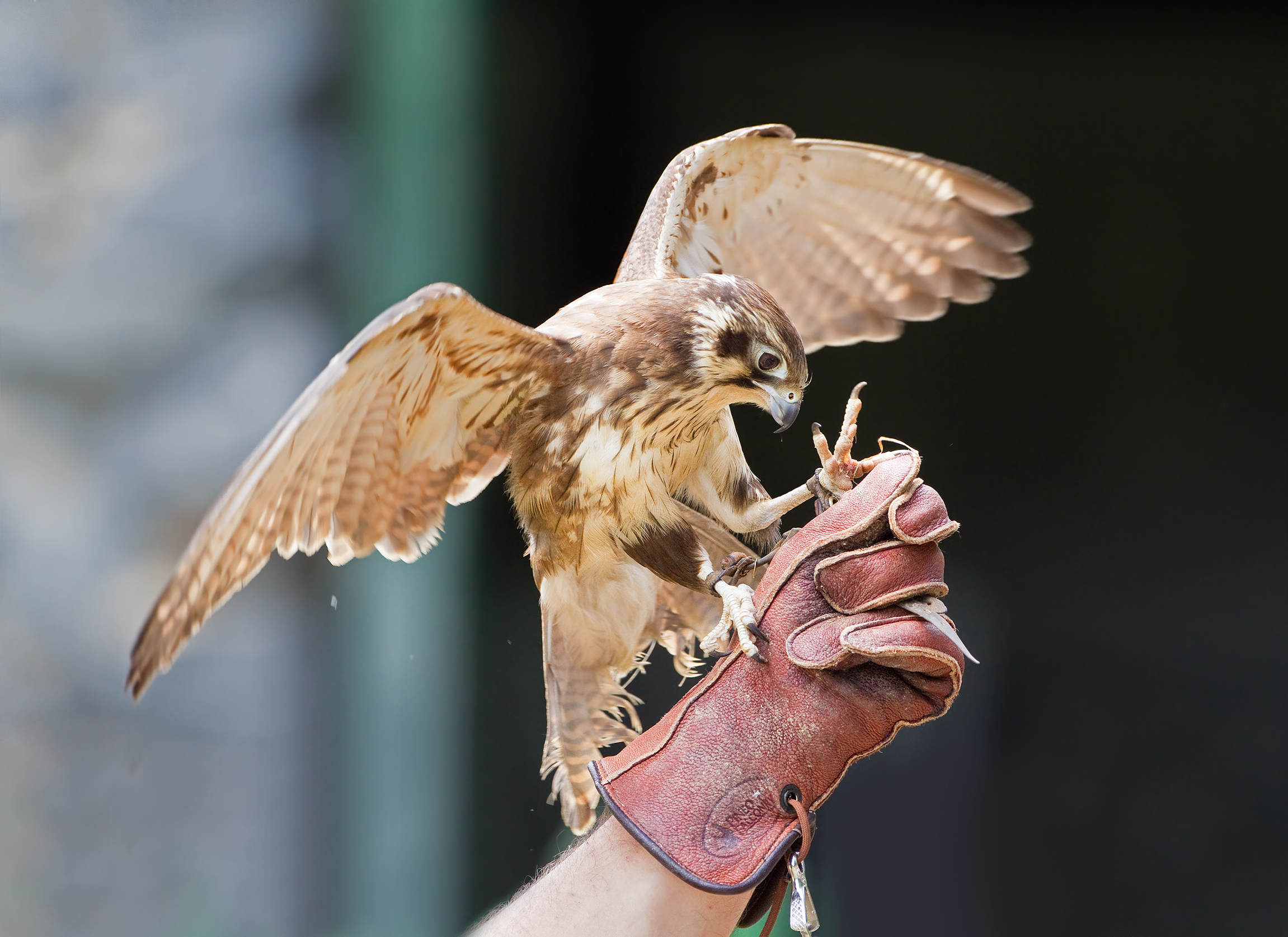
A brown falcon used for falconry in Tasmania

The brown falcon (Falco berigora) is a relatively large falcon native to Australia and New Guinea.

A number of plumage morphs occur, with the primary distinction being between the pale morph and the dark morph. Both morphs usually have dark brown upper parts and wing coverts. Dark morph birds have predominantly dark under parts, although some light streaking is common. Pale morph birds have white underparts that are varyingly streaked with brown, sometimes heavily so. Pale individuals may also have prominently white under tail coverts and these may be diagnostic. A distinctive aspect of their behaviour is shown in the breeding season when brown falcons make a loud, high pitched, cackle call (like a laying hen) and screeching while in flight.

The species name berigora has Aboriginal origins.

== Description ==
Adults are usually 40 to 50 cm (16 to 20 in) long. They are found in light and dark forms and a variety of intermediates. Animals typically have red-brown heads with narrow black streaks with a light crown and off-white chin. Wings are a spotted red-brown with dark brown quills. Beaks are light blue/grey; eyes are brown. The falcons make a loud cackle call uttered frequently.

== Breeding and habitat ==
Brown falcons breed from June to November, usually in an old nest of a larger passerine or another hawk species; they occasionally nest in hollow limbs of trees. The brown falcon lays between two and five eggs that have red and brown spots and blotches.

== Subspecies ==
- F. b. novaeguineae : central and eastern New Guinea and coastal northern Australia
- F. b. berigora : Australia (except coastal north) and Tasmania

== Diet ==
The brown falcon eats small mammals, including house mice. They also eat young rabbits in the summer. It also eats small birds, lizards, snakes, and a variety of invertebrates, particularly caterpillars, grasshoppers, crickets, and beetles. Insects form the bulk of the animals' diets during winter and the falcons often chase the insects on the ground.

== Behaviour ==
Brown falcons and other Australian firehawks have been said to pick up sticks with flames and dropping them to spread fires and prey on escaping animals. According to Audubon, "That anecdotal evidence is sourced from personal testimonies by Australian firefighters and aboriginal people, as well as historical literature, and amounts to 14 firsthand narratives of this specific occurrence."

== Gallery ==
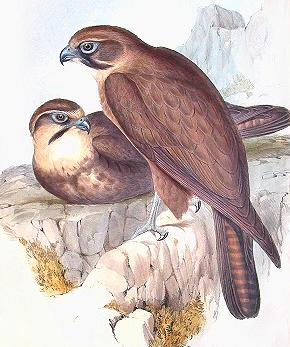
John Gould illustration

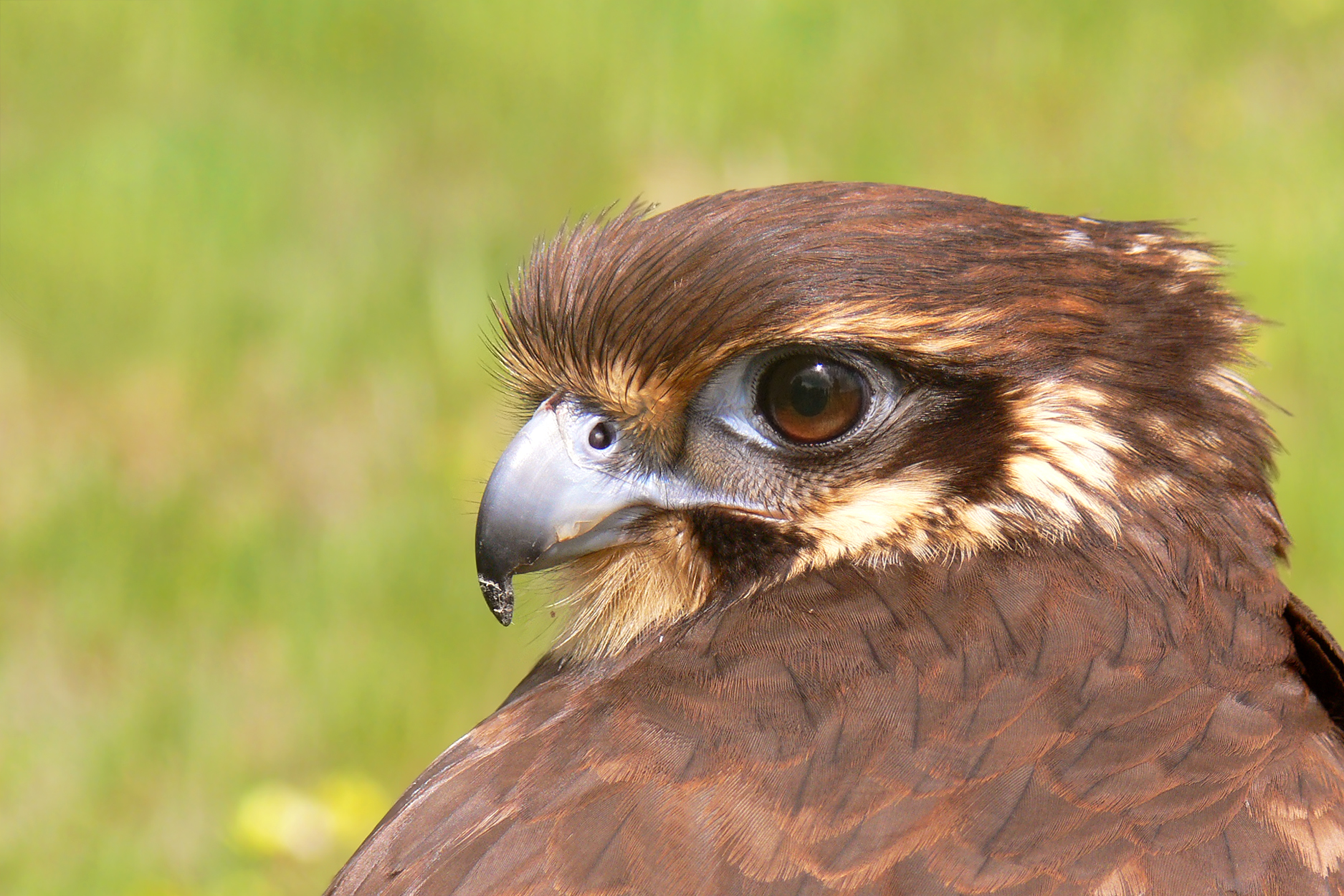
Brown falcon portrait

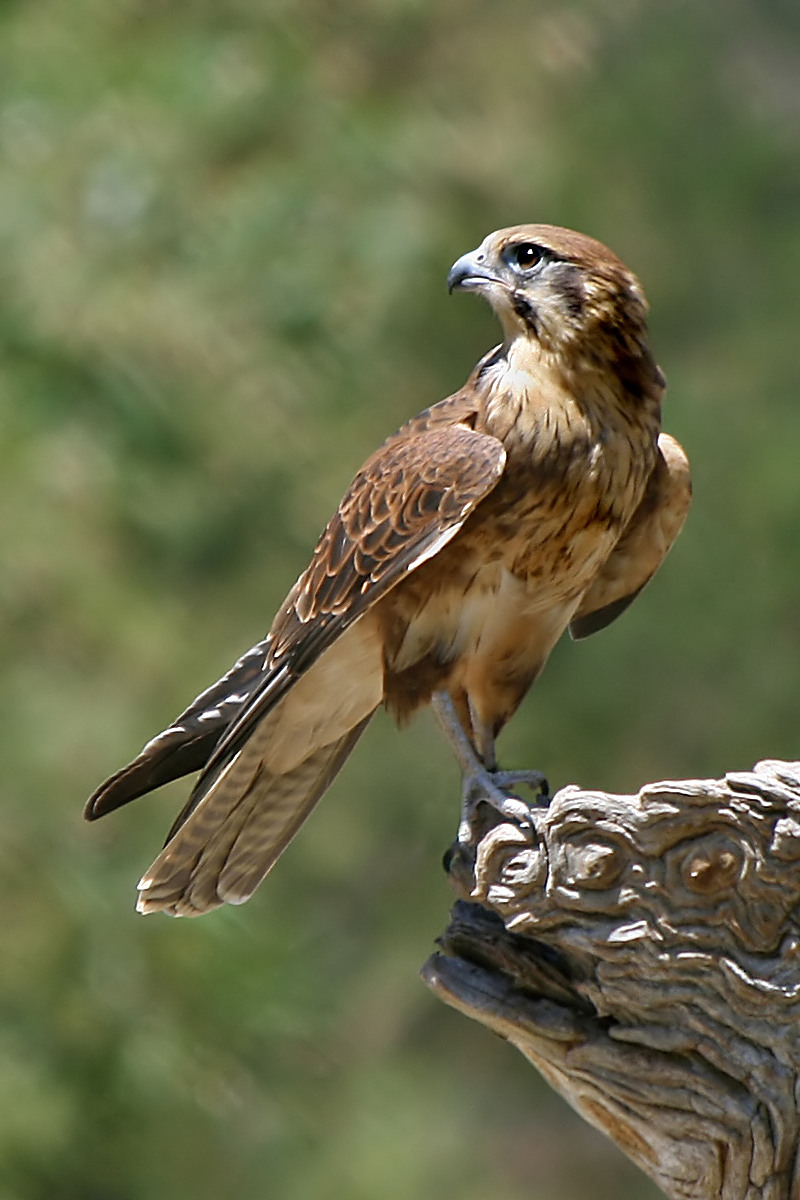
Brown falcon

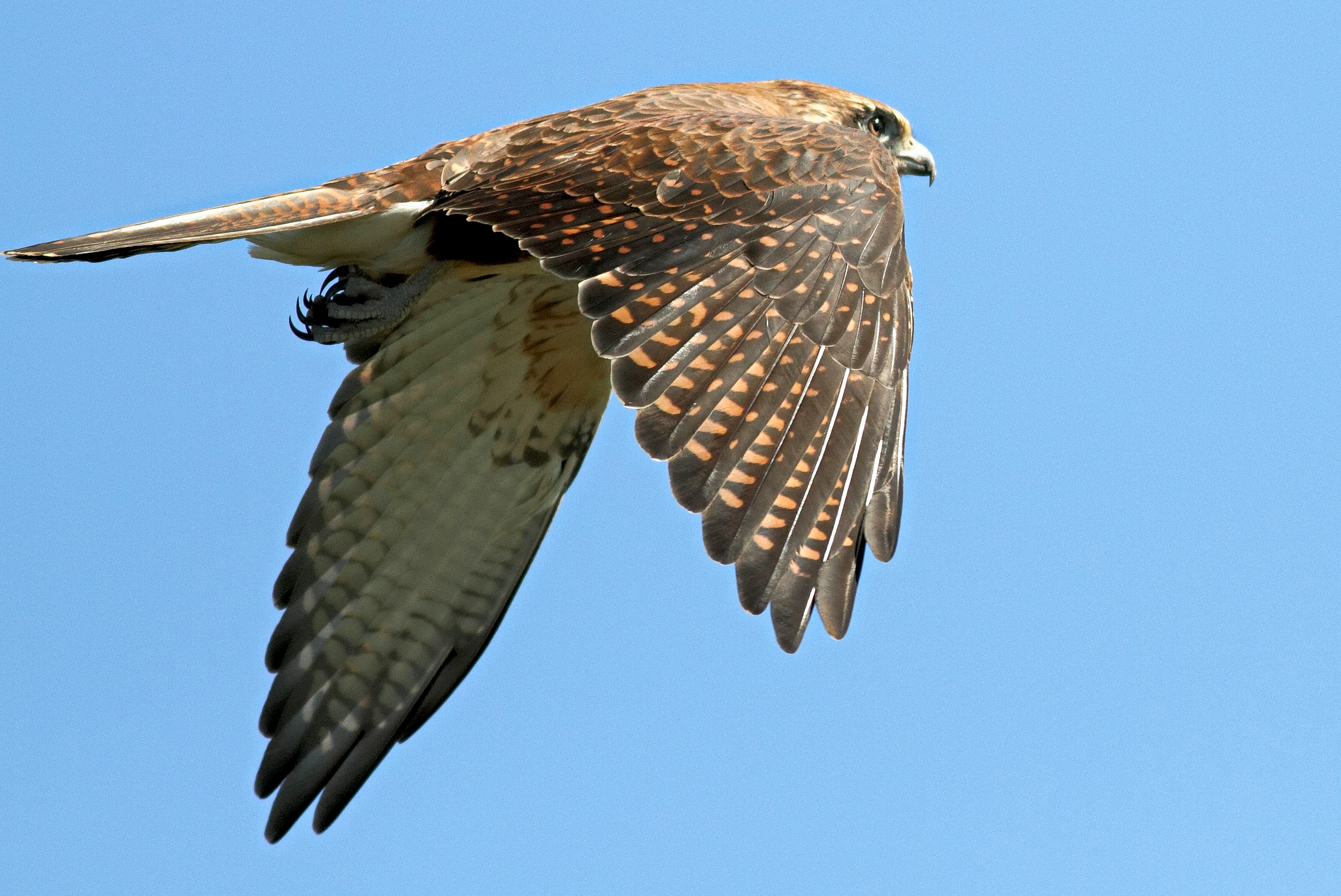
In flight in Victoria, Australia

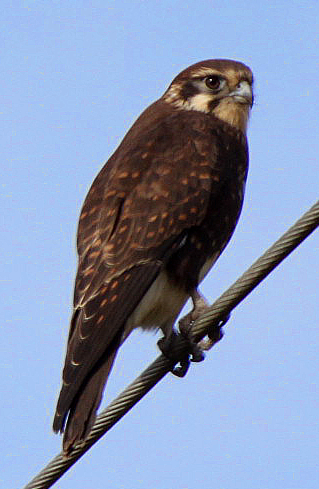
Adult, Tasmania

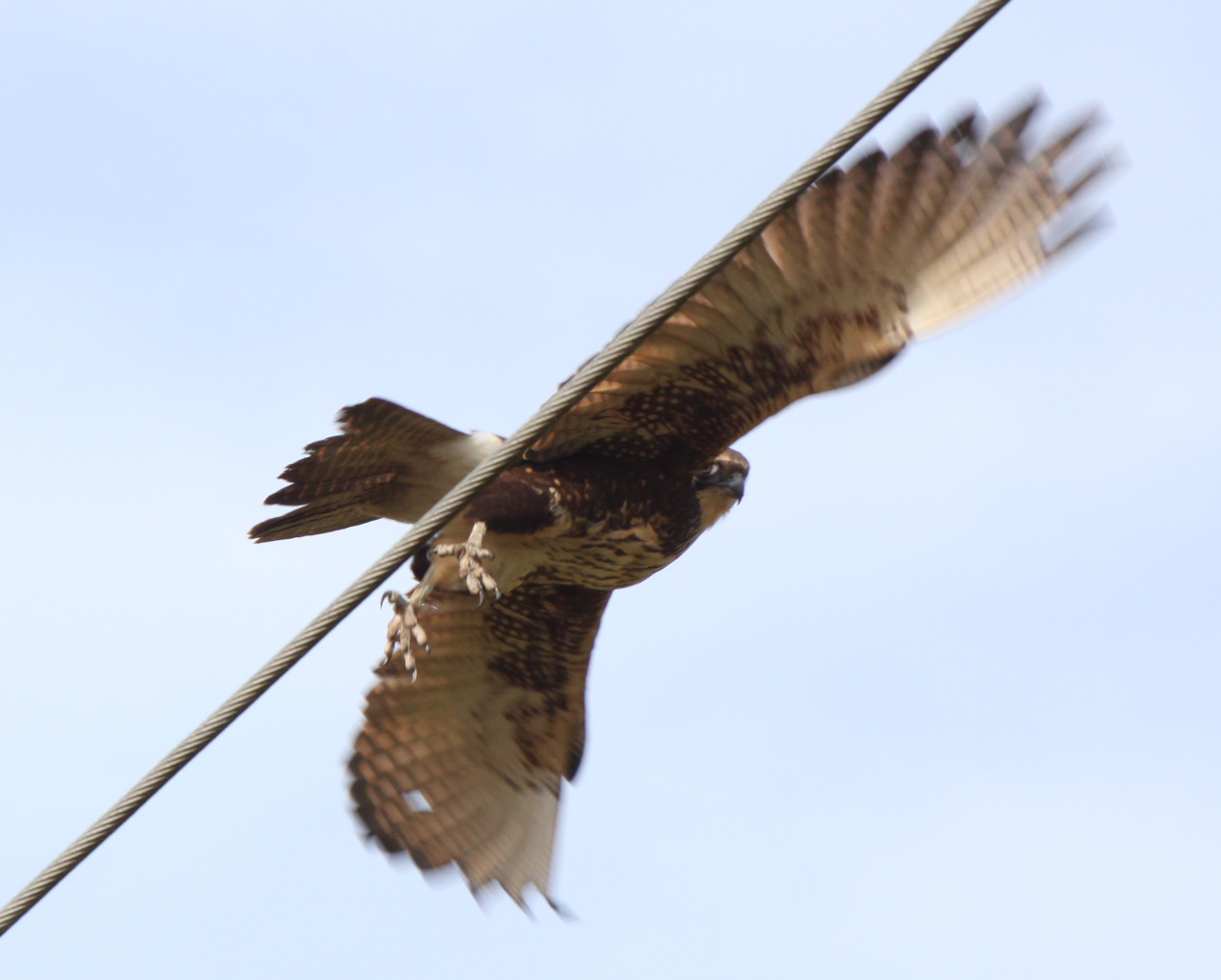
Adult (pale morph) takes flight, Tasmania

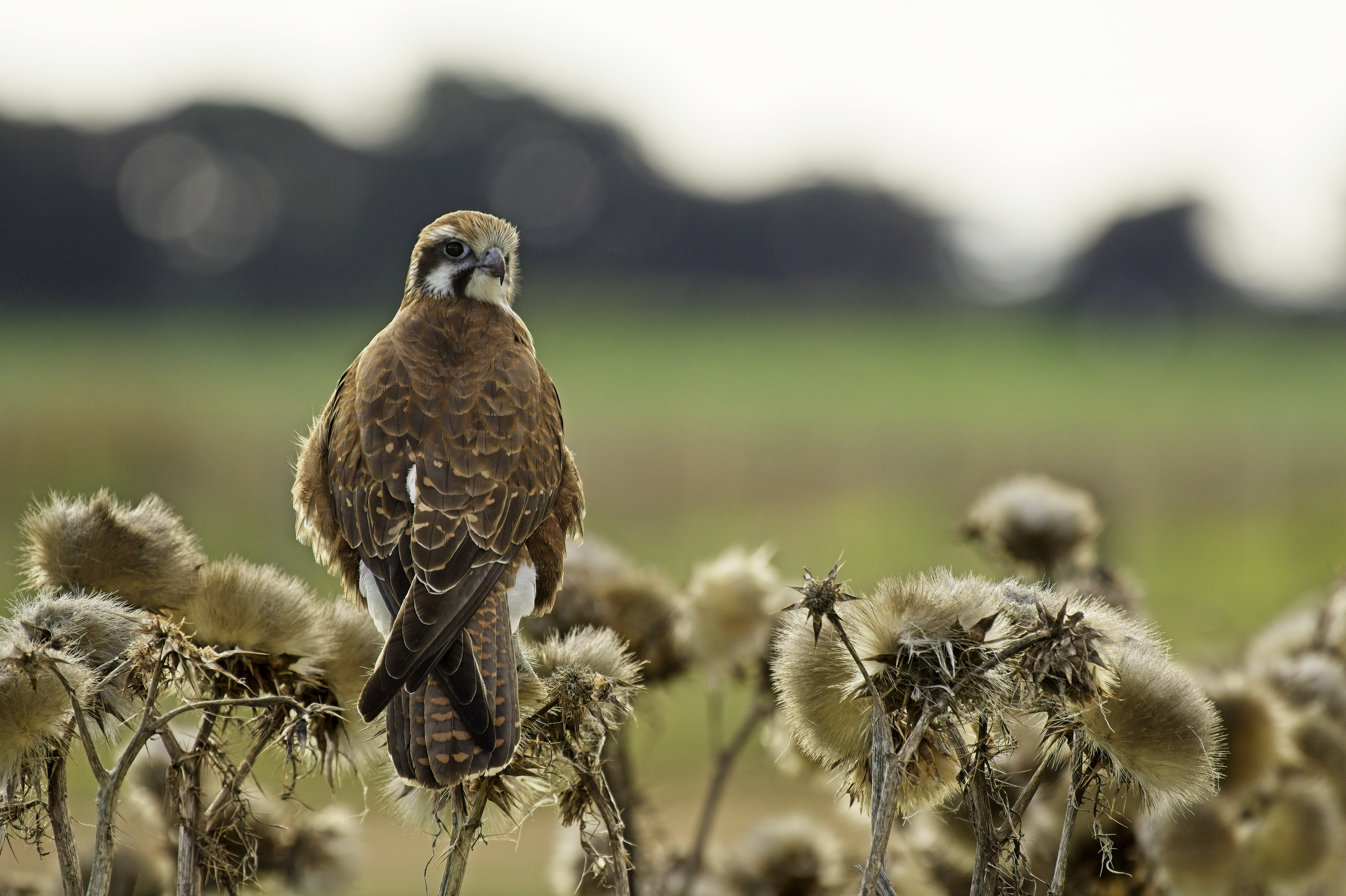
Brown falcon perched on thistles near Lake Borrie, Vic.

Brown falcon attending prey, Pikedale, S. Queensland
