= Pentecost River =

River in the Kimberley region of Western Australia

Coordinates: 15°46′48″S 127°52′41″E

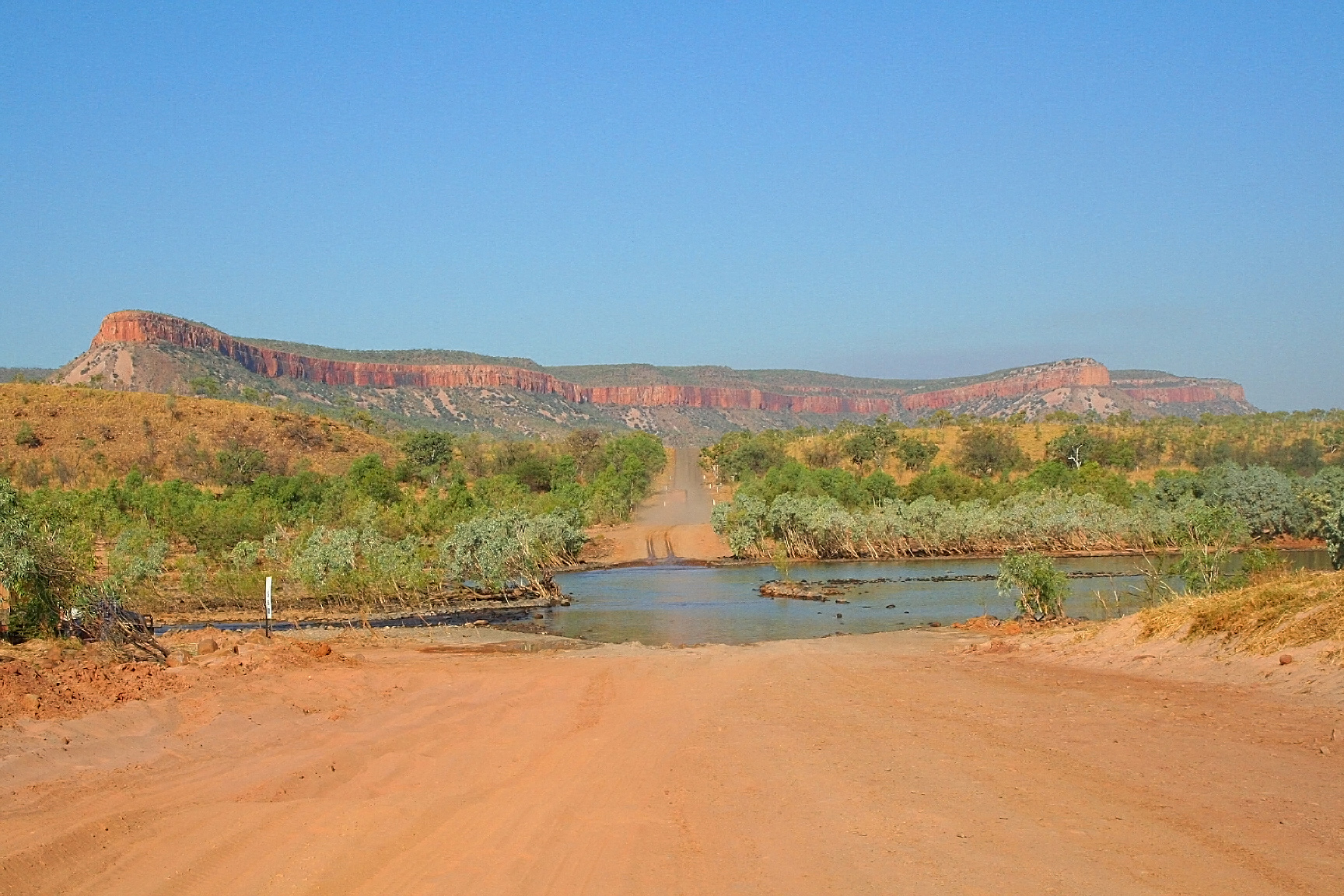
- Gibb River Road Crossing

Location
- Country: Australia

Physical characteristics
- Source
  - elevation: 248 metres (814 ft)
- Mouth
  - location: Cambridge Gulf
- Length: 118 km (73 mi)
- Basin size: 29,413 km^{2} (11,356 sq mi)

The Pentecost River is a river in the Kimberley region of Western Australia.

The Pentecost rises in the Durack Range and flows north through El Questro Station where it joins the Chamberlain River, then continues north crossing the Gibb River Road, skirts the eastern edge of Drysdale River National Park and later discharges into the west arm of the Cambridge Gulf.

Tributaries of the Pentecost include the Chamberlain River, Salmond River, Gap Creek and Five Mile Creek. The Chamberlain and Salmond are both longer than the Pentecost.

The river is named after surveyor and geologist John Pentecost, who surveyed the river in 1882 on an expedition led by Michael Durack.

The traditional owners of the areas around the river are the Arnga people.
