= Windham Township, Wyoming County, Pennsylvania =

Township in Pennsylvania, US

Windham Township
- Township
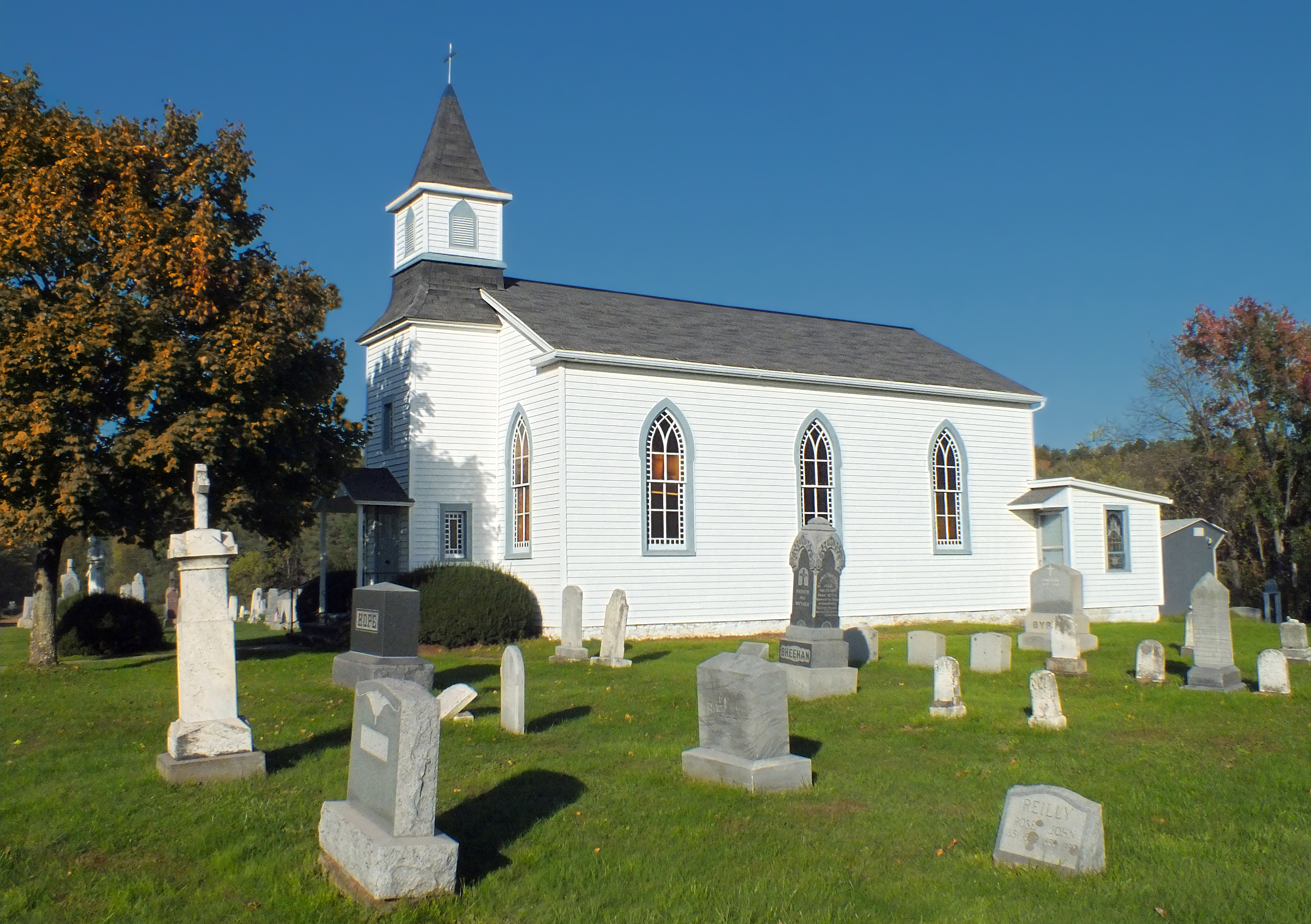
- Saint Anthony's Roman Catholic Church in the township

- Location of Pennsylvania in the United States

- Location of Windham Township in Pennsylvania
- Coordinates: 41°36′00″N 76°06′59″W
- Country: United States
- State: Pennsylvania
- County: Wyoming

Area
  - Total: 23.16 sq mi (59.98 km^{2})
  - Land: 22.26 sq mi (57.65 km^{2})
  - Water: 0.90 sq mi (2.32 km^{2})
- Elevation: 843 ft (257 m)

Population (2020)
  - Total: 737 ▼
  - Estimate (2021): 740
  - Density: 36.9/sq mi (14.26/km^{2})
- Time zone: UTC-5 (EST)
  - Summer (DST): UTC-4 (EDT)
- ZIP Code: 18623, 18629
- Area code: 570
- FIPS code: 42-131-85680

Windham Township is a township in Wyoming County, Pennsylvania, United States. As of the 2020 census, the township population was 737.

== Geography ==
According to the United States Census Bureau, the township has a total area of 23.2 square miles (60.0 km^{2}), of which 22.3 square miles (57.7 km^{2}) is land and 0.9 square mile (2.4 km^{2}, or 3.88%) is water.

== Demographics ==
Historical population
Census	Pop.	Note	%±
2010	841		—
2020	737		−12.4%
2021 (est.)	740		0.4%
U.S. Decennial Census

As of the census of 2010, there were 841 people, 333 households, and 255 families residing in the township. The population density was 37.7 inhabitants per square mile (14.6/km^{2}). There were 408 housing units at an average density of 18.3/sq mi (7.1/km^{2}). The racial makeup of the township was 97.7% White, 0.2% African American, 0.1% Native American, 0.4% Asian, and 1.5% from two or more races. Hispanic or Latino of any race were 1.5% of the population.

There were 333 households, out of which 30.9% had children under the age of 18 living with them, 60.4% were married couples living together, 9% had a female householder with no husband present, and 23.4% were non-families. 16.2% of all households were made up of individuals, and 6.9% had someone living alone who was 65 years of age or older. The average household size was 2.53 and the average family size was 2.80.

In the township the population was spread out, with 21.9% under the age of 18, 60.3% from 18 to 64, and 17.8% who were 65 years of age or older. The median age was 43.6 years.

The median income for a household in the township was $49,554, and the median income for a family was $50,921. Males had a median income of $45,250 versus $25,313 for females. The per capita income for the township was $18,837. About 10.6% of families and 13.2% of the population were below the poverty line, including 13.3% of those under age 18 and none of those age 65 or over.
