= Durack River =

River in the Kimberley, Western Australia

Coordinates: 16°20′34″S 127°9′44″E

Location
- Country: Australia

Physical characteristics
- Source
  - location: Durack Range
  - elevation: 563 metres (1,847 ft)
- Mouth
  - location: Cambridge Gulf
  - elevation: sea level
- Length: 306 km (190 mi)
- Basin size: 4,088 km^{2} (1,578 sq mi)
- Discharge
  - average: 408,400 ML/a (12.94 m^{3}/s; 457.0 cu ft/s)

Durack River is a river in the Kimberley region of Western Australia.

The river rises below the Durack Range then flows north, discharging into the west arm of Cambridge Gulf.

There are 14 tributaries of the Durack, including Chapman River, Wood River, Ellenbrae Creek, Royston Creek, Koolawerii Creek and Wilson Creek.

The river was named in 1882 by the surveyor John Pentecost after explorer and Kimberley pioneer Michael Durack, who was the first European to cross the river.

The traditional owners of the area that the river flows through are the Kitja, Ola and Wilawila peoples.
