= El Questro Wilderness Park =

Pastoral lease in Western Australia

Coordinates: 16.00885°S 127.98075°E

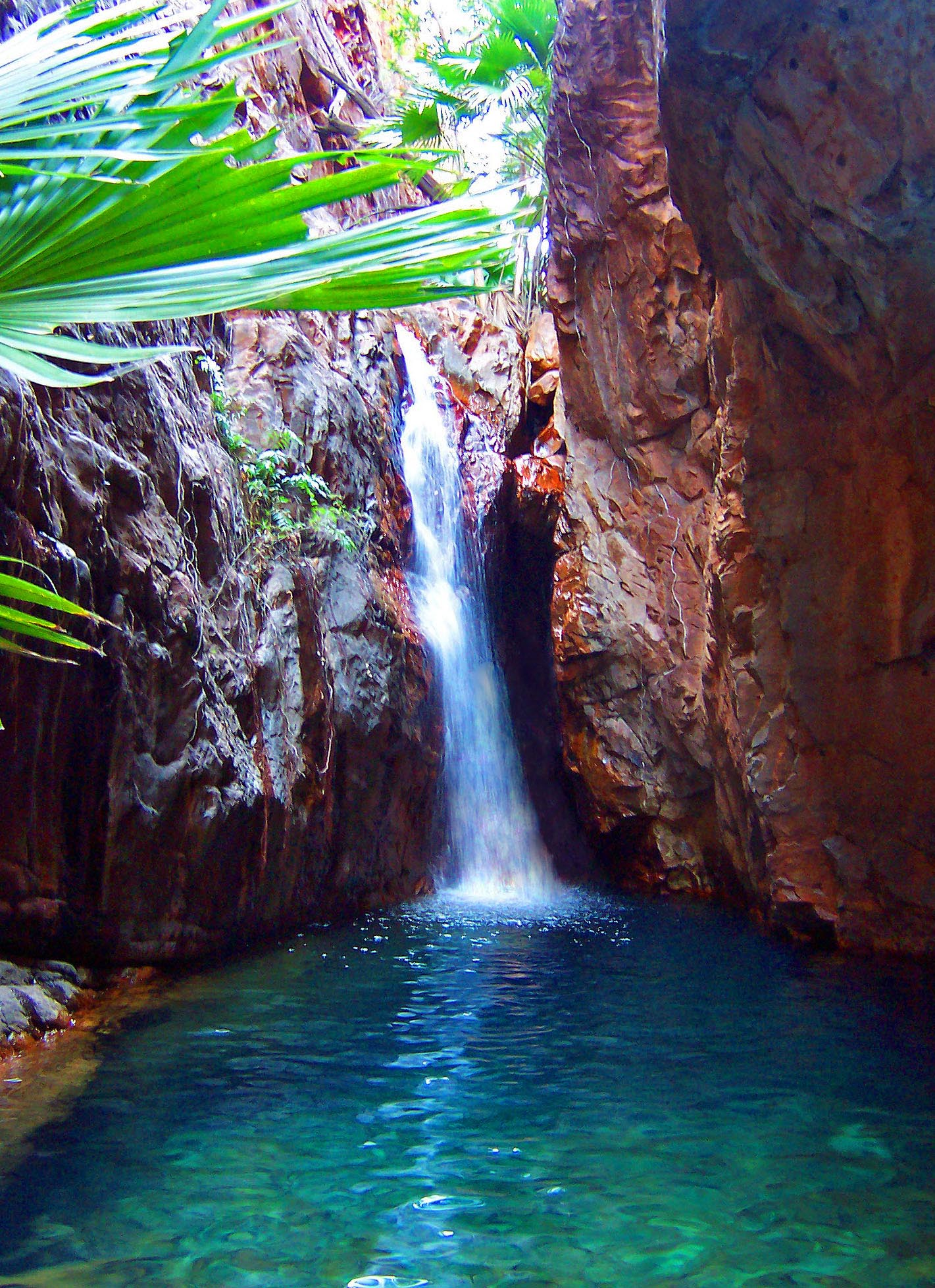
El Questro Gorge waterfall

El Questro Wilderness Park is a wilderness park on El Questro Station, a cattle station that diversified its pastoral operation to include tourism, located in the Kimberley region of Western Australia. It remains a working cattle station with a herd of approximately 6,000 head. In 2012 the pastoral station lessee was GPT. El Questro station operates under Crown Lease number CL207-1984 and has Land Act number LA3114/1180.

The park is located 110 km (68 mi) west of Kununurra and is accessed from the Gibb River Road and encompasses an area of over 4,047 km^{2} (1,000,000 acres) that extends some 80 km (50 mi) into the heart of the Kimberley.

The station was first established in 1903. Will and Celia Burrell bought the cattle station in 1991 and developed it into a wilderness park tourist destination. The Burrells sold El Questro to GPT in 2005. GPT onsold the wilderness park to Delaware North in March 2010.

There are three resorts on El Questro: Emma Gorge (offering safari cabins), The Station (bungalows and camping) and The Homestead (luxury rooms and suites) – all operated by G'Day Group

== See also ==
- List of ranches and stations
- List of pastoral leases in Western Australia
