= Victoria River (Northern Territory) =

River in the Northern Territory, Australia

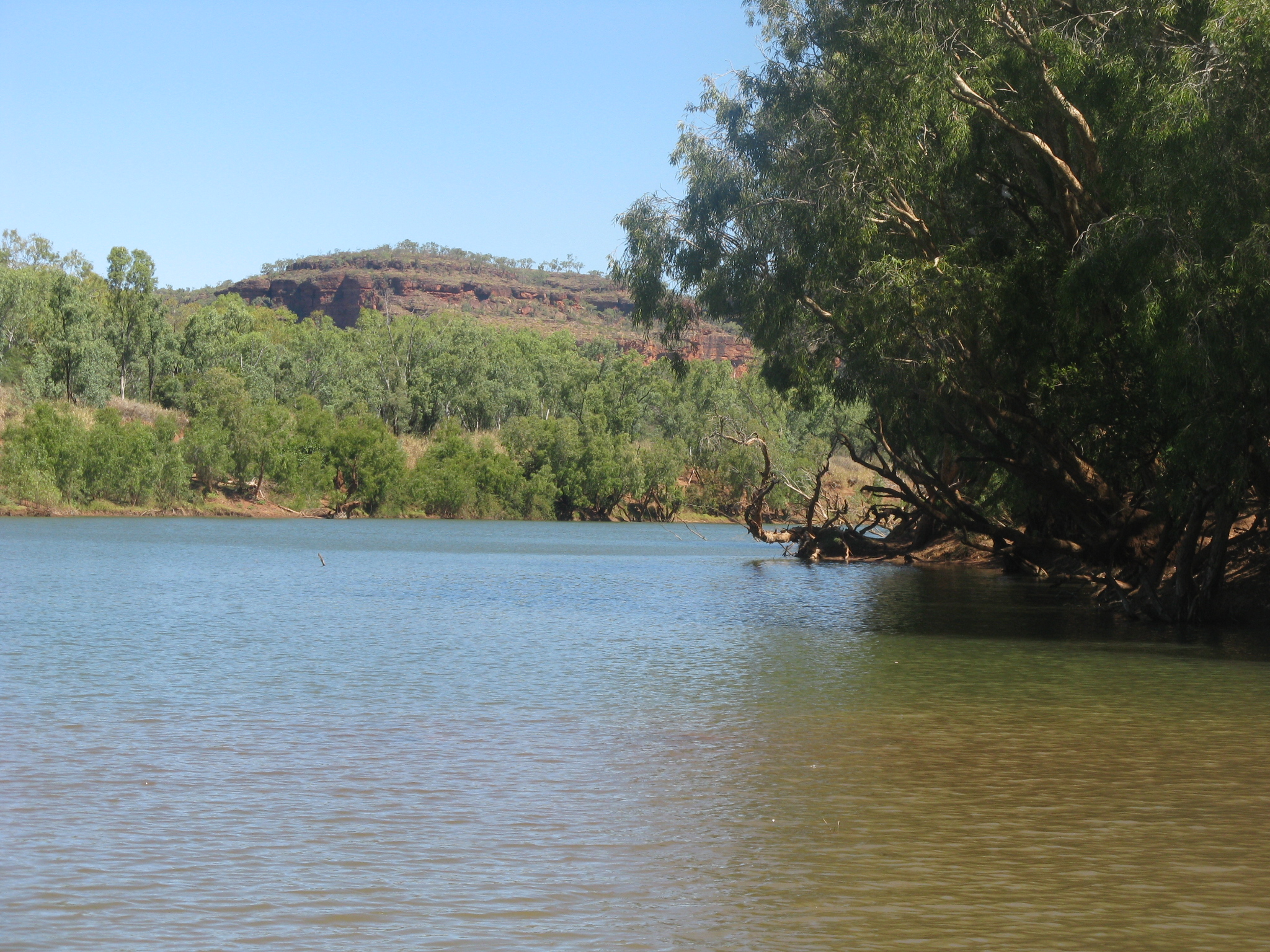
- Victoria River access, near the roadhouse Victoria River crossing

- Location of the Victoria River mouth in the Northern Territory
- Etymology: Queen Victoria

Location
- Country: Australia
- Territory: Northern Territory
- Region: Victoria Bonaparte (IBRA)

Physical characteristics
- Source: Mount Farquharson
  - coordinates: 17°28′16.1436″S 130°49′39.6048″E
  - elevation: 364 m (1,194 ft)
- Mouth: Joseph Bonaparte Gulf
  - coordinates: 14°56′50″S 129°33′15″E
  - elevation: 0 m (0 ft)
- Length: 560 km (350 mi)
- Basin size: 87,900 km^{2} (33,900 sq mi) to 99,412.5 km^{2} (38,383.4 mi^{2})
- Discharge
  - location: Near mouth
  - average: (Period: 1971–2000)345.7 m^{3}/s (10,910 GL/a) 158.4 m^{3}/s (5,590 cu ft/s)

Basin features
- River system: Victoria River
- Tributaries
  - left: Wickham, Baines, Bullo
  - right: Camfield, Angalarri
- National park: Judbarra / Gregory NP

The Victoria River is a river in the bioregion of Victoria Bonaparte in the Northern Territory of Australia. It flows for 560 kilometres (350 mi) from its source south of the Judbarra / Gregory National Park to the Joseph Bonaparte Gulf in the Timor Sea.

== History ==
On 12 September 1819, Philip Parker King came to the mouth of the Victoria and, twenty years later, in 1839, Captain J. C. Wickham arrived at the same spot in HMS Beagle and named the river after Queen Victoria. Crew members of the Beagle followed the river upstream into the interior for more than 200 kilometres (120 mi).

In August 1855 Augustus Gregory sailed from Moreton Bay and at the end of September reached the estuary of the Victoria River. He sailed up the river and carried out extensive exploration.

In 1847 Edmund Kennedy went on an expedition to trace the route of the "River Victoria" of Thomas Mitchell with a view to finding whether there was a practical route to the Gulf of Carpentaria. This "River Victoria" was later renamed the Barcoo River.

== Location and features ==
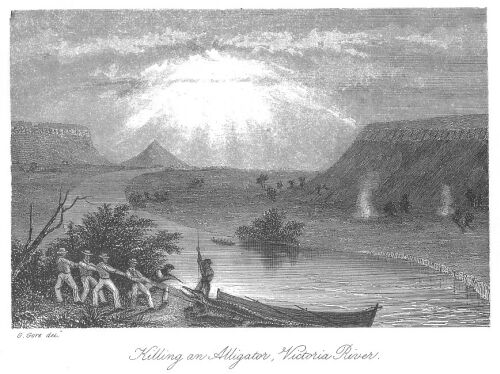
Killing an Alligator, Victoria River, from John Lort Stokes' Discoveries in Australia (1846, vol. 2)

Flowing for 560 kilometres (350 mi) from its source, south of the Judbarra / Gregory National Park, until it enters Joseph Bonaparte Gulf in the Timor Sea, the Victoria River is the longest singularly named permanent river in the Northern Territory. It is the second longest permanent river in the Northern Territory, as defined by international standards, the longest being the Katherine/Daly River. (Note: This is a single river with two separating European names, which was until recently deemed as two separate rivers due to the European naming conventions of earlier times. It begins just south of Jabiru, high in the Arnhem Land escarpment and flows into the Timor Sea some 690 kilometres (430 mi) later, thus making it 130 kilometres (81 mi) longer than the Victoria River.)

Important wetlands are found in the lower reaches of the river with forming suitable habitat for waterfowl breeding colonies and roosting sites for migratory shorebirds. Large areas of rice-grass floodplain grasslands are also found along the river.

Part of the area adjoining the river mouth has been identified as the Legune (Joseph Bonaparte Bay) Important Bird Area because of its importance for waterbirds.

=== Tributaries ===
The river has 56 tributaries including the Camfield River, Wickham River, Battle Creek, Angalarri River, Gidyea Creek, and Armstrong River. The river also flows through several waterholes, such as Catfish waterhole and Four Mile Waterhole. It has a mean annual outflow of 5,000 gigalitres (1.321×10^{12} US gal),

=== Cattle stations ===
Several large cattle stations are found along the length of the river, including Riveren where the river originates, Victoria River Downs, Coolibah Station, and Wave Hill Station, which is known for the historic strike known as the "Wave Hill walk-off" in the 1960s to the 1970s.

== Eponyms ==
A species of turtle, Emydura victoriae, is named after the Victoria River.

== See also ==
- List of rivers of Australia § Northern Territory
