= List of pastoral leases in the Northern Territory =

List of agricultural leases in the Northern Territory

Pastoral leases in the Northern Territory, more commonly known as stations or cattle stations, are some of the largest in Australia. There are 223 pastoral leases gazetted into 11 pastoral districts over approximately 600 000 square kilometres of land.

Established from the late 1800s onwards, the leases were initially issued by the South Australian government, which administered the Northern Territory until 1911, and enable long-term tenure of Crown land. The first leases were Owen Springs and Undoolya Station in Central Australia in 1872. The expansion of the cattle industry caused widespread dispossession of Aboriginal people, with significant damage to water sources and sensitive environments.

There is only one remaining sheep station, at Avon Downs, the rest rear cattle which is sold domestically or live into South East Asia, mainly Indonesia. They also support other non-dominant agricultural uses and tourism.

All pastoral leases are managed under the Pastoral Land Act 1992 of the Northern Territory.

== List ==
Name of pastoral lease	Pastoral district	LGA	Area (km^{2)}
Adder	Barkly	Barkly Regional Council	1199
Aileron	Northern Alice Springs	Central Desert Shire	4078
Alexandria	Barkly	Barkly Regional Council	8391
Allambi	Southern Alice Springs	MacDonnell Regional Council	2586
Alroy Downs	Barkly	Barkly Regional Council	4384
Ambalindum	Northern Alice Springs	MacDonnell Regional Council	3317
Amburla	Northern Alice Springs	MacDonnell Regional Council	2305
Ammaroo	Plenty	Central Desert Shire	3001
Amungee Mungee	Gulf	Roper Gulf Regional Council	3169
Andado	Southern Alice Springs	MacDonnell Regional Council	10689
Angas Downs	Southern Alice Springs	MacDonnell Regional Council	3205
Anningie	Northern Alice Springs	Central Desert Shire	4428
Annitowa	Tennant Creek	Barkly Regional Council	4312
Anthony Lagoon	Barkly	Barkly Regional Council	6079
Arapunya	Plenty	Central Desert Shire	2431
Argadargada	Plenty	Central Desert Shire	5139
Aroona	Katherine	Victoria Daly Regional Council	1500
Austral Downs	Barkly	Barkly Regional Council	2004
Auvergne	Victoria River District	Victoria Daly Regional Council	4142
Avago	Sturt Plateau	Roper Gulf Regional Council	1578
Avon Downs	Barkly	Barkly Regional Council	3939
Ban Ban Springs	Darwin	Victoria Daly Regional Council	1872
Banjo	Sturt Plateau	Roper Gulf Regional Council	578
Banka Banka West	Barkly	Barkly Regional Council	1407
Beetaloo Station	Barkly	Barkly Regional Council	7078
Benmarra	Barkly	Barkly Regional Council	4511
Big River	Roper	Roper Gulf Regional Council	707
Birdum Creek	Sturt Plateau	Roper Gulf Regional Council	763
Birrimba	Sturt Plateau	Roper Gulf Regional Council	2595
Birrundudu	Victoria River District	Victoria Daly Regional Council	4150
Bloodwood Downs	Sturt Plateau	Roper Gulf Regional Council	577
Bond Springs	Northern Alice Springs	MacDonnell Regional Council	1499
Bonrook	Darwin	Victoria Daly Regional Council	491
Bridge Creek	Darwin	Unincorporated	333
Broadmere	Gulf	Roper Gulf Regional Council	2590
Brunchilly	Barkly	Barkly Regional Council	3235
Brunette Downs	Barkly	Barkly Regional Council	12212
Buchanan Downs	Sturt Plateau	Roper Gulf Regional Council	1256
Bullo River	Victoria River District	Victoria Daly Regional Council	1627
Bunda	Victoria River District	Victoria Daly Regional Council	1788
Burramurra	Barkly	Barkly Regional Council	2205
Bushy Park	Northern Alice Springs	MacDonnell Regional Council	1693
Calvert Hills	Gulf	Roper Gulf Regional Council	4832
Camfield	Victoria River District	Victoria Daly Regional Council	2769
Cattle Creek	Victoria River District	Victoria Daly Regional Council	7085
Claravale	Darwin	Victoria Daly Regional Council	613
Coniston	Northern Alice Springs	Central Desert Shire	2170
Conways	Roper	Roper Gulf Regional Council	1392
Cow Creek	Sturt Plateau	Roper Gulf Regional Council	444
Cresswell Downs	Barkly	Barkly Regional Council	6417
Curtin Springs	Southern Alice Springs	MacDonnell Regional Council	4152
Dalmore Downs	Barkly	Barkly Regional Council	4776
Deep Well	Southern Alice Springs	MacDonnell Regional Council	1618
Delmore Downs	Northern Alice Springs	Barkly Regional Council	382
Delamere	Victoria River District	Victoria Daly Regional Council	3002
Delny	Northern Alice Springs	Central Desert Shire	833
Derry Downs	Plenty	Central Desert Shire	4290
Derwent	Northern Alice Springs	MacDonnell Regional Council	1659
Dixie Station	Katherine	Victoria Daly Regional Council	462
Dneiper	Northern Alice Springs	Central Desert Shire	884
Dorisvale	Darwin	Victoria Daly Regional Council	675
Douglas	Darwin	Unincorporated	1943
Dry River	Sturt Plateau	Roper Gulf Regional Council	667
Dungowan	Sturt Plateau	Roper Gulf Regional Council	4454
East Ranken	Barkly	Barkly Regional Council	1430
Elizabeth Downs	Darwin	Victoria Daly Regional Council	2054
Elkedra	Tennant Creek	Barkly Regional Council	5406
Epenarra	Tennant Creek	Barkly Regional Council	2658
Erldunda	Southern Alice Springs	MacDonnell Regional Council	2930
Eva Downs	Barkly	Barkly Regional Council	2781
Florina	Katherine	Katherine Town Council	575
Flying Fox	Roper	Roper Gulf Regional Council	895
Forrest Hill	Sturt Plateau	Roper Gulf Regional Council	538
Georgina Downs	Barkly	Barkly Regional Council	3470
Gilnockie	Sturt Plateau	Roper Gulf Regional Council	705
Glen Helen	Southern Alice Springs	MacDonnell Regional Council	1409
Goondooloo	Roper	Roper Gulf Regional Council	902
Gorrie	Gulf	Roper Gulf Regional Council	701
Greenbank	Gulf	Roper Gulf Regional Council	1126
Hamilton Downs	Northern Alice Springs	MacDonnell Regional Council	2034
Hayfield	Sturt Plateau	Roper Gulf Regional Council	1701
Helen Springs	Barkly	Barkly Regional Council	5062
Henbury	Southern Alice Springs	MacDonnell Regional Council	5168
Hidden Valley	Sturt Plateau	Roper Gulf Regional Council	2802
Horseshoe Bend	Southern Alice Springs	MacDonnell Regional Council	6030
Huckitta	Plenty	Central Desert Shire	1596
Humbert River	Victoria River District	Victoria Daly Regional Council	1080
Idracowra	Southern Alice Springs	MacDonnell Regional Council	4628
Inverway	Victoria River District	Victoria Daly Regional Council	2538
Jervois	Plenty	Central Desert Shire	2736
Jindare	Darwin	Victoria Daly Regional Council	1204
Jinka	Plenty	Central Desert Shire	2033
Kalala	Sturt Plateau	Roper Gulf Regional Council	3760
Katherine Downs	Katherine	Katherine Town Council	198
Kiana	Gulf	Roper Gulf Regional Council	3318
Killarney	Victoria River District	Victoria Daly Regional Council	2819
Kirkimbie	Victoria River District	Victoria Daly Regional Council	2304
Koolpinyah	Darwin	Litchfield Council	769
Kurundi	Tennant Creek	Barkly Regional Council	3857
Labelle Downs	Darwin	Unincorporated	603
Lake Nash	Barkly	Barkly Regional Council	8487
Lakefield	Sturt Plateau	Roper Gulf Regional Council	586
Larrizona	Gulf	Roper Gulf Regional Council	702
Legune	Victoria River District	Victoria Daly Regional Council	1788
Lilla Creek	Southern Alice Springs	MacDonnell Regional Council	2060
Limbunya	Victoria River District	Victoria Daly Regional Council	5218
Litchfield	Darwin	Unincorporated	1336
Lonesome Dove	Roper	Roper Gulf Regional Council	723
Lorella	Gulf	Roper Gulf Regional Council	3840
Lucy Creek	Plenty	Central Desert Shire	4055
Lyndavale	Southern Alice Springs	MacDonnell Regional Council	3762
Mcdonald Downs	Northern Alice Springs	Central Desert Shire	2069
Mainoru	Roper	Roper Gulf Regional Council	1315
Mallapunyah Springs	Gulf	Roper Gulf Regional Council	4329
Manangoora	Gulf	Roper Gulf Regional Council	1416
Manbulloo	Katherine	Katherine Town Council	3791
Manners Creek	Plenty	Central Desert Shire	6770
Margaret Downs	Sturt Plateau	Roper Gulf Regional Council	608
Marqua	Plenty	Central Desert Shire	4410
Marrakai	Darwin	Unincorporated	578
Mary River East	Darwin	Victoria Daly Regional Council	1345
Mary River West	Darwin	Victoria Daly Regional Council	929
Maryfield	Sturt Plateau	Roper Gulf Regional Council	1473
Maryvale	Barkly	Barkly Regional Council	3244
Mathison Station	Katherine	Victoria Daly Regional Council	652
Mcarthur River	Gulf	Roper Gulf Regional Council	7225
Mckinlay River	Darwin	Unincorporated	470
Middle Creek	Sturt Plateau	Roper Gulf Regional Council	602
Mittiebah	Barkly	Barkly Regional Council	4034
Montejinni East	Victoria River District	Victoria Daly Regional Council	1597
Montejinni West	Victoria River District	Victoria Daly Regional Council	1495
Moroak	Roper	Roper Gulf Regional Council	1427
Mount Cavenagh	Southern Alice Springs	MacDonnell Regional Council	913
Mount Denison	Northern Alice Springs	Central Desert Shire	2702
Mount Doreen	Northern Alice Springs	Central Desert Shire	7337
Mount Drummond	Barkly	Barkly Regional Council	2920
Mount Ebenezer	Southern Alice Springs	MacDonnell Regional Council	1640
Mount Keppler	Darwin	Unincorporated	225
Mount McMinn	Roper	Roper Gulf Regional Council	809
Mount Riddock	Northern Alice Springs	Central Desert Shire	2633
Mount Ringwood	Darwin	Unincorporated	462
Mount Skinner	Northern Alice Springs	Central Desert Shire	5968
Mountain Valley	Roper	Roper Gulf Regional Council	1410
Mulga Park	Southern Alice Springs	MacDonnell Regional Council	2647
Mungabroom	Barkly	Barkly Regional Council	3469
Murranjai	Sturt Plateau	Roper Gulf Regional Council	4379
Murray Downs	Tennant Creek	Barkly Regional Council	5595
Numul-Namul	Roper	Roper Gulf Regional Council	497
Napperby	Northern Alice Springs	Central Desert Shire	3146
Napperby	Northern Alice Springs	Central Desert Shire	2278
Narwietooma	Northern Alice Springs	MacDonnell Regional Council	2590
Nenen	Sturt Plateau	Roper Gulf Regional Council	775
Neutral Junction	Barkly	Barkly Regional Council	4609
New Crown	Southern Alice Springs	MacDonnell Regional Council	6158
Newcastle Waters	Barkly	Barkly Regional Council	3404
Newhaven	Northern Alice Springs	Central Desert Shire	2610
Newry	Victoria River District	Victoria Daly Regional Council	2467
Numery	Southern Alice Springs	MacDonnell Regional Council	2022
Nutwood Downs	Gulf	Roper Gulf Regional Council	4358
Old Macdonald Downs	Northern Alice Springs	Central Desert Shire	545
Old Mount Bundey	Darwin	Unincorporated	384
Ooratippra	Plenty	Central Desert Shire	4283
Orange Creek	Southern Alice Springs	MacDonnell Regional Council	2386
Owen Springs	Southern Alice Springs	MacDonnell Regional Council	3010
Palmer Valley	Southern Alice Springs	MacDonnell Regional Council	2993
Phillip Creek	Tennant Creek	MacDonnell Regional Council	3624
Pine Hill	Northern Alice Springs	Central Desert Shire	2691
Powell Creek	Barkly	Barkly Regional Council	4181
Providence	Sturt Plateau	Roper Gulf Regional Council	531
Pungalina	Gulf	Roper Gulf Regional Council	1937
Ringwood	Southern Alice Springs	MacDonnell Regional Council	2280
Riveren	Victoria River District	Victoria Daly Regional Council	3016
Rockhampton Downs	Barkly	Barkly Regional Council	5119
Rocklands	Barkly	Barkly Regional Council	3594
Rosewood	Victoria River District	Victoria Daly Regional Council	2768
Scott Creek	Katherine	Victoria Daly Regional Council	1070
Seven Emu	Gulf	Roper Gulf Regional Council	2092
Singleton	Tennant Creek	Barkly Regional Council	2943
Soudan	Barkly	Barkly Regional Council	2244
Spirit Hills	Victoria River District	Victoria Daly Regional Council	3766
Spring Creek	Gulf	Roper Gulf Regional Council	2334
Stapleton Station	Katherine	Victoria Daly Regional Council	598
Stirling	Northern Alice Springs	Central Desert Shire	7218
Sunday Creek	Sturt Plateau	Roper Gulf Regional Council	400
Suplejack	Victoria River District	Victoria Daly Regional Council	3817
Tandyidgee	Barkly	Barkly Regional Council	2749
Tanumbirini	Gulf	Roper Gulf Regional Council	5001
Tarlee	Sturt Plateau	Roper Gulf Regional Council	597
Tarlton Downs	Plenty	Central Desert Shire	3111
Tennant Creek	Tennant Creek	Barkly Regional Council	3647
The Garden	Southern Alice Springs	MacDonnell Regional Council	2126
Tipperary	Darwin	Victoria Daly Regional Council	2100
Tobermorey	Plenty	Central Desert Shire	5994
Todd River	Southern Alice Springs	MacDonnell Regional Council	1962
Ucharonidge	Barkly	Barkly Regional Council	2455
Umbeara	Southern Alice Springs	MacDonnell Regional Council	3572
Undoolya	Southern Alice Springs	MacDonnell Regional Council	1444
Vermelha	Sturt Plateau	Roper Gulf Regional Council	2039
Victoria River Downs	Victoria River District	Victoria Daly Regional Council	8935
Victory Downs	Southern Alice Springs	MacDonnell Regional Council	3038
Walhallow	Barkly	Barkly Regional Council	3580
Wallamunga	Victoria River District	Victoria Daly Regional Council	2582
Waterloo	Victoria River District	Victoria Daly Regional Council	1895
Wave Hill	Victoria River District	Victoria Daly Regional Council	5493
Welltree	Darwin	Unincorporated	391
West Ranken	Barkly	Barkly Regional Council	2852
Western Creek	Sturt Plateau	Roper Gulf Regional Council	606
Western Creek	Sturt Plateau	Roper Gulf Regional Council	416
Willeroo	Katherine	Victoria Daly Regional Council	1710
Wollogorang	Gulf	Roper Gulf Regional Council	5761
Wombungi	Victoria River District	Victoria Daly Regional Council	1290
Wongalara	Roper	Roper Gulf Regional Council	1912
Woodgreen	Northern Alice Springs	Central Desert Shire	1230
Woolner	Darwin	Unincorporated	647
Wyworrie	Sturt Plateau	Roper Gulf Regional Council	428
Yambah	Northern Alice Springs	MacDonnell Regional Council	2310

== See also ==
- List of the largest stations in Australia
