= Buchanan, Northern Territory =

Buchanan Northern Territory
- Coordinates: 17°42′20″S 129°42′54″E
- Population: 55 (2016 census)
  - Density: 0.002268/km^{2} (0.00587/sq mi)
- Established: 4 April 2007
- Postcode(s): 0852
- Elevation: 403 m (1,322 ft)(weather station)
- Area: 24,252 km^{2} (9,363.7 sq mi)
- Time zone: ACST (UTC+9:30)
- Location: 612 km (380 mi) S of Darwin; 473 km (294 mi) SW of Katherine; 309 km (192 mi) SSE of Kununurra
- LGA(s): Victoria Daly Region
- Territory electorate(s): Gwoja
- Federal division(s): Lingiari
Mean max temp	Mean min temp	Annual rainfall
33.0 °C; 91 °F	17.4 °C; 63 °F	539.7 mm 21.2 in
Suburbs around Buchanan:
Western Australia	Baines; Gregory	Gregory
Western Australia	Buchanan	Gregory; Gurindji
Western Australia	Tanami; Gurindji	Lajamanu
- Footnotes: Locations; Adjoining localities

Buchanan (/bjuːˈkænən/ bew-KAN-ən) is a locality in the Northern Territory of Australia located in the territory's west adjoining the border with the state of Western Australia about 612 kilometres (380 mi) south of the territory capital of Darwin and about 473 kilometres (294 mi) south-west of the municipal seat in Katherine.

The locality consists of the following land (from north to south) – the Malngin and the Malngin 2 Aboriginal Land Trusts and the Limbunya pastoral lease, the Kirkimbie, Bunda, Inverway and Riveren pastoral leases, and the Wallamunga and Birrindudu pastoral leases. It has an area of 24,252 square kilometres (9,364 sq mi).

The locality's boundaries and name were gazetted on 4 April 2007. Its name is derived from the Nathaniel Buchanan, a pioneering drover who first brought cattle overland from Queensland to the Northern Territory in 1877.

The 2016 Australian census which was conducted in August 2016 reports that Buchanan had a population of 55 people.

Buchanan is located within the federal division of Lingiari, the territory electoral division of Stuart and the local government area of the Victoria Daly Region.]

== Climate ==
Climate data for Inverway, elevation 403 m (1,322 ft), (1971–1987 normals, extremes 1969–1987)
Month	Jan	Feb	Mar	Apr	May	Jun	Jul	Aug	Sep	Oct	Nov	Dec	Year
Record high °C (°F)	43.7 (110.7)	43.0 (109.4)	41.1 (106.0)	38.0 (100.4)	35.7 (96.3)	34.0 (93.2)	33.5 (92.3)	36.7 (98.1)	39.3 (102.7)	42.3 (108.1)	45.0 (113.0)	44.0 (111.2)	45.0 (113.0)
Mean daily maximum °C (°F)	35.7 (96.3)	34.6 (94.3)	34.0 (93.2)	32.2 (90.0)	29.8 (85.6)	26.6 (79.9)	26.8 (80.2)	30.7 (87.3)	33.3 (91.9)	36.3 (97.3)	37.7 (99.9)	38.0 (100.4)	33.0 (91.4)
Mean daily minimum °C (°F)	22.9 (73.2)	22.6 (72.7)	20.6 (69.1)	16.9 (62.4)	13.8 (56.8)	10.1 (50.2)	9.2 (48.6)	11.9 (53.4)	16.2 (61.2)	20.1 (68.2)	22.3 (72.1)	22.9 (73.2)	17.5 (63.4)
Record low °C (°F)	16.0 (60.8)	16.5 (61.7)	11.5 (52.7)	8.5 (47.3)	3.5 (38.3)	1.5 (34.7)	−1.0 (30.2)	3.2 (37.8)	4.5 (40.1)	8.5 (47.3)	12.5 (54.5)	13.1 (55.6)	−1.0 (30.2)
Average rainfall mm (inches)	168.6 (6.64)	168.7 (6.64)	84.0 (3.31)	30.4 (1.20)	8.7 (0.34)	5.5 (0.22)	0.4 (0.02)	1.8 (0.07)	4.1 (0.16)	27.8 (1.09)	39.6 (1.56)	93.4 (3.68)	633 (24.93)
Average rainy days (≥ 1.0 mm)	9.3	9.1	4.5	1.2	0.7	0.4	0.1	0.1	0.3	2.5	3.7	7.3	39.2
Source: Australian Bureau of Meteorology (rain 1991-2020)
