= Baines, Northern Territory =

Baines Northern Territory
- Coordinates: 15°50′20″S 129°41′24″E
- Population: 249 (2016 census)
  - Density: 0.010622/km^{2} (0.02751/sq mi)
- Established: 4 April 2007
- Postcode(s): 0852
- Elevation: 13 m (43 ft)
- Area: 23,443 km^{2} (9,051.4 sq mi)
- Time zone: ACST (UTC+9:30)
- Location: 421 km (262 mi) S of Darwin; 359 km (223 mi) SW of Katherine; 114 km (71 mi) NE of Kununurra
- LGA(s): Victoria Daly Region
- Territory electorate(s): Gwoja
- Federal division(s): Lingiari
Mean max temp	Mean min temp	Annual rainfall
34.9 °C; 95 °F	21.1 °C; 70 °F	959.0 mm 37.8 in
Suburbs around Baines:
Western Australia	Timor Sea; Bradshaw	Bradshaw
Western Australia	Baines	Bradshaw; Gregory
Western Australia	Buchanan	Gregory
- Footnotes: Adjoining localities

Baines is a locality in the Northern Territory of Australia located in the territory's west adjoining the border with the state of Western Australia about 421 kilometres (262 mi) south of the territory capital of Darwin and about 359 kilometres (223 mi) south-west of the municipal seat in Katherine.

The locality is bounded by the Western Australian border to the west, the limits of Northern Territory waters to the north and in part to the east by the Victoria River. It consists of the following land (from north to south):

1. Land described as NT Portion 5774 and the Legune pastoral lease
2. Land described as NT Portion 1584 and the Spirit Hills and Bullo River pastoral leases
3. The Keep River National Park and the Newry and Auvergne pastoral leases, and
4. The Rosewood and Waterloo pastoral leases and the Nagurungguru Aboriginal Lands Trust.

As of 2020, it has an area of 23,443 square kilometres (9,051 sq mi).

The locality's boundaries and name were gazetted on 4 April 2007. Its name is derived from "the Baines River, a tributary of the Victoria River, which was named during A C Gregory's North Australian Expedition of 1855-56 after Thomas Baines, artist of the expedition."

The 2016 Australian census which was conducted in August 2016 reports that Baines had a population of 249 people of which 157 (63.1%) identified as being "Aboriginal and/or Torres Strait Islander people."

Baines is located within the federal division of Lingiari, the territory electoral division of Stuart and the local government area of the Victoria Daly Region.
