= Arid Lands Environment Centre =

Australian environmental organisation

- Founded: 1980
- Type: Non-Profit Organization
- Purpose: Environmental advocacy
- Headquarters: Alice Springs, Australia
- Location: Northern Territory
- Key people: Adrian Tomlinson
- Website: https://www.alec.org.au/

Arid Lands Environment Centre (ALEC) is a member-based environmental organisation based in Alice Springs in Central Australia.

== History ==
ALEC was started by a group of scientists, activists, lawyers and conservationists in the face of major project developments in the region.

== Key projects ==
=== Anti-fracking ===
Over the last decade, ALEC has campaigned to stop fracking in the Northern Territory in partnership with other anti-fracking community groups. It is particularly focused on the Beetaloo Basin which is estimated to increase Australia's carbon emissions by over 20%.

=== Water protection ===
ALEC advocates for the protection of water and water rights in the Northern Territory. It is currently focused on a proposed development project on Singleton Station. In 2022, they unsuccessfully took legal action with the Central Land Council alleging Northern Territory Government approvals did not follow the Water Act.

=== Buffel Grass management ===
ALEC is advocating for management of invasive buffel grass after record fires in the region in 2023.

=== Alice Springs Future Grid ===
Undertaking community engagement aspects of a virtual power plant (VPP) trial in Alice Springs involving 50 participants with solar and battery storage systems.

=== Alice Water Smart ===
Running from 2013 – 2016, the $15 million program delivered with Power and Water Corporation, Northern Territory Government, Alice Springs Town Council and Tourism NT supported by the Australian Government's Water for the Future initiative. It aimed to help the town reduce its water use by 1600 million litres per year.

=== Alice Solar City ===
As one of seven projects funded through the Australian Government's Solar Cities Program launched in 2004, Alice Springs was announced as a solar city in 2007. The $42 million project was designed to explore how solar power, energy efficient technologies and new approaches to electricity supply and pricing could increase the renewable update and sustainability of the town and saw the development of the Uterne solar plant. The program ran until 2013.
