= Arnold River =

Arnold River may refer to:

- Arnold River (Northern Territory), a tributary of the Hodgson River in Australia
- Arnold River (New Zealand), a tributary of the Grey River
- Arnold River (Saskatchewan), a tributary of the Rapid River in Canada
- Arnold River (lac aux Araignées), Quebec, Canada
