= Moroak =

Pastoral lease in Northern Territory, Australia

Coordinates: 14.823°S 133.702°E

Location in Northern Territory

Moroak Station is a pastoral lease that operates as a cattle station in the Northern Territory, Australia.

== Location ==
The property is situated approximately 70 kilometres (43 mi) east of Mataranka and 98 kilometres (61 mi) north east of Larrimah. The Roper River flows through the property and acts as the southern boundary of Moroak and the northern boundary of Elsey Station. Moroak is bounded to the north by Mountain Valley Station, to the west by Goondooloo Station and to the east by Flying Fox Station.

== Description ==
Occupying an area of 1,427 square kilometres (551 sq mi), the station is not especially large by Australian standards, but it is still larger than several countries (e.g., São Tomé and Príncipe, Kiribati, Bahrain). The terrain is mostly flat with open grassy plains, woodlands and some hilly areas. The Roper River flows through the property, and there are many dams, waterholes and creeks. Infrastructure includes more than 700 km of fencing, a large homestead set on the banks of the Roper River, staff accommodation, numerous sheds and five cattle yards, each with its own stock camp.

== History ==
The traditional owners of the area are the Mangarayi people. Some of the Mangarayi work as rangers along the river.

Arnold Alfred Thick owned the property in 1950. The pastoral leasehold was transferred to John Lesley Stuart MacFarlane and his family in 1951. McFarlane was a member for the locality of Elsey in the Northern Territory Government for many years. In 1962, in one of the last of the major overland Australian droving trips, MacFarlane commissioned Joe Groves to move over 1,000 head of cattle from Moroak to the Dajarra railhead in western Queensland. In 1985, MacFarlane sold the station to his son, Tim. He died in early 1986 and was buried at Moroak Station.

Tony Davis — who also owned Limbunya Station — acquired the property in 2004 for A$10 million. In 2013 Moroak was run in conjunction with Goondooloo, and together the leases occupy an area of 2,329 square kilometres (899 sq mi); the lands were stocked with 25,000 head of Brahman cattle. Between 2004 and 2014 Davis built 40 additional dams, had the property completely fenced and made improvements to the homestead. Tony and Pam Davis sold the property in 2015 to Donald Hoar, who had previously managed Balfour Downs Station.

== See also ==
- List of pastoral leases in the Northern Territory
