= Marlee =

Marlee is a female given name. Notable persons with this name include:

- Marlee Matlin (born 1965), American actress
- Marlee Ranacher, Australian author
- Marlee Scott (born 1986), Canadian country music singer now living in the United States

== See also ==
- Marley (disambiguation)
