= Amungee Mungee =

Pastoral lease in the Northern Territory

Coordinates: 16.4815°S 134.0954°E

Location in the Northern Territory

Amungee Mungee Station is a pastoral lease that operates as a cattle station in the Northern Territory of Australia.

== Location ==
It is situated about 132 kilometres (82 mi) north east of Elliott and 240 kilometres (149 mi) south west of Borroloola. The property surrounds the Bullwaddy Conservation Reserve to the north, south and west. The station abuts Tanumbirini Station to the north east, Beetaloo to the south east, Shenandoah to the west and Nutwood Downs to the north. The Carpentaria Highway passes through the property.

== Description ==
Amungee Mungee currently occupies an area of 3,285 square kilometres (1,268 sq mi) and is situated on the Sturt Plateau bioregion. The area is characterised by thin infertile soils on a lateritic land surface. Large fragmented stands of bullwaddy interspersed with areas of lancewood are common to the area.

== History ==
The traditional owners of the area are the Jingili people. The area around the Amungee Mungee waterhole, from which the station takes its name, is a significant dreaming area for the Jingili.

The Overland Telegraph was completed in 1873 and led to the first leases being taken up in the area shortly afterwards. Many were surrendered in 1889 for non-payment of rent. In 1883 Harold Murray Bathern, known "Bullwaddy Bates", droved a herd of cattle to Brunette Downs Station. Bates and George Bostock took up Beetaloo Station with Bates leaving the property to Bates after he walked off the property.

In 1968 the block of land now known as Amungee Mungee was put up for ballot and was won by Jeff and Cooee Hills. The station was renamed Cooee Hills and was inhabited by the Hills in 1971. The family fenced the property and stocked it with 1,250 head of cattle. The family left the property and went back to Queensland after their son died in 1977. Reg and Mollie Hartig acquired the property shortly afterwards and remained there until 1981 when Reg died and was buried on the property.

The Zlotowski family, who also own Wollogorang Station near the Queensland border, acquired the property at some prior to 2006.

As of 2014 the 3,285-square-kilometre (1,268 sq mi) property was still on the market along with at least 15 others in the Kimberley and Northern Territory. The destocked property sold later the same year for A$6.5 million by the Zlotowski family to a partnership. The majority partner in the venture is BB Retail Capital, headed by Brett Blundy, and the other partner is the Bullwaddy Pastoral owned by Adrian and Emma Brown. 10,000 head of cattle were purchased from the Australian Agricultural Company to restock the property later in 2014. The partnership hope to increase the number of watering points around the property from 20 to 160 and increase the stocking rate from 20,000 head to 100,000 head of cattle.

== See also ==
- List of ranches and stations
