= Stapleton Station (pastoral lease) =

Pastoral lease in the Northern Territory

Coordinates: 14°48′S 131°32′E

Location in the Northern Territory

Stapleton Station is a pastoral lease in the Northern Territory of Australia that operates as a cattle station .

It is situated about 80 kilometres (50 mi) west of Katherine.

Harry Sargent acquired the property in 1923 with the intention of growing cotton but eventually turned to tin mining and cattle. He slowly increased his leases to about 700 square miles (1,813 km^{2}). During the war the increase in population served to boost the market and improve the fortunes of the run. After the war times were tough again and after Sargent died most of the family drifted away from the property leaving his daughter Winnie with Stapleton.

Asa and his son Ray Townsend had moved to Australia from Florida in 1956; Ray and his brother Bob Townsend acquired Stapleton in 1961 for their family.

La Belle Station, a 610-square-kilometre (236 sq mi) outstation of Stapleton, was sold off by the Townsends in 2001 after being developed into a major breeding and finishing property.

The Townsends moved back to the property in 2007 after selling Tanumbirini Station. Stapleton was once part of the much larger 1,700-square-kilometre (656 sq mi) property that was subdivided by the Townsends.

In 2011 the Towsends sold Mathison Station but retained Stapleton. Mathison was sold for less than A$2.1 million to Pancho Beef after it had been passed in at auction. It had been routinely carrying 5,500 head but was only stocked with 1,800 head at auction. Stapleton was passed in at the same auction for A$ 3.2 million.

Henry Townsed was experimenting with his herd in 2012 by importing Nguni embryos from Africa to cross with the shorthorns in a bid to increase tenderness in the meat.

In 2013 approximately 5,000 hectares (12,355 acres) of grazing land at the property was burnt out by a bushfire that started as a result of a flare used during a Defence Force exercise at the nearby Delamere Air Weapons Range. The station manager, Adam Coffey, and another three station owners sought compensation for the feed lost during the fire that burned for five days through the area.

As of 2014 the 599-square-kilometre (231 sq mi) property was still on the market along with at least 15 others in the Northern Territory.

== See also ==
- List of ranches and stations
