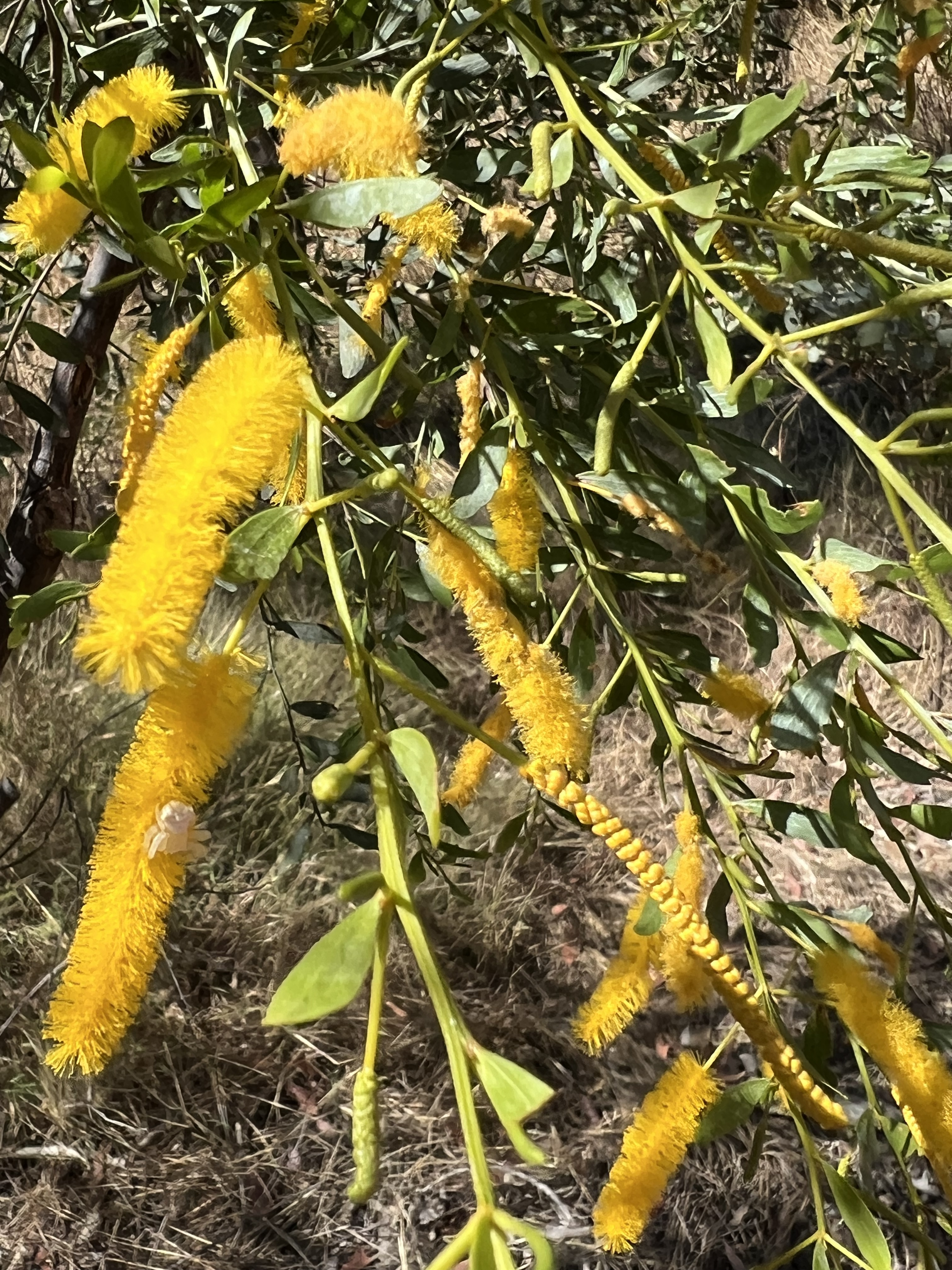

Conservation status
- Priority Three — Poorly Known Taxa (DEC)

Scientific classification
- Kingdom: Plantae
- Clade: Tracheophytes
- Clade: Angiosperms
- Clade: Eudicots
- Clade: Rosids
- Order: Fabales
- Family: Fabaceae
- Subfamily: Caesalpinioideae
- Clade: Mimosoid clade
- Genus: Acacia
- Species: A. richardsii

Binomial name
- Acacia richardsii Maslin
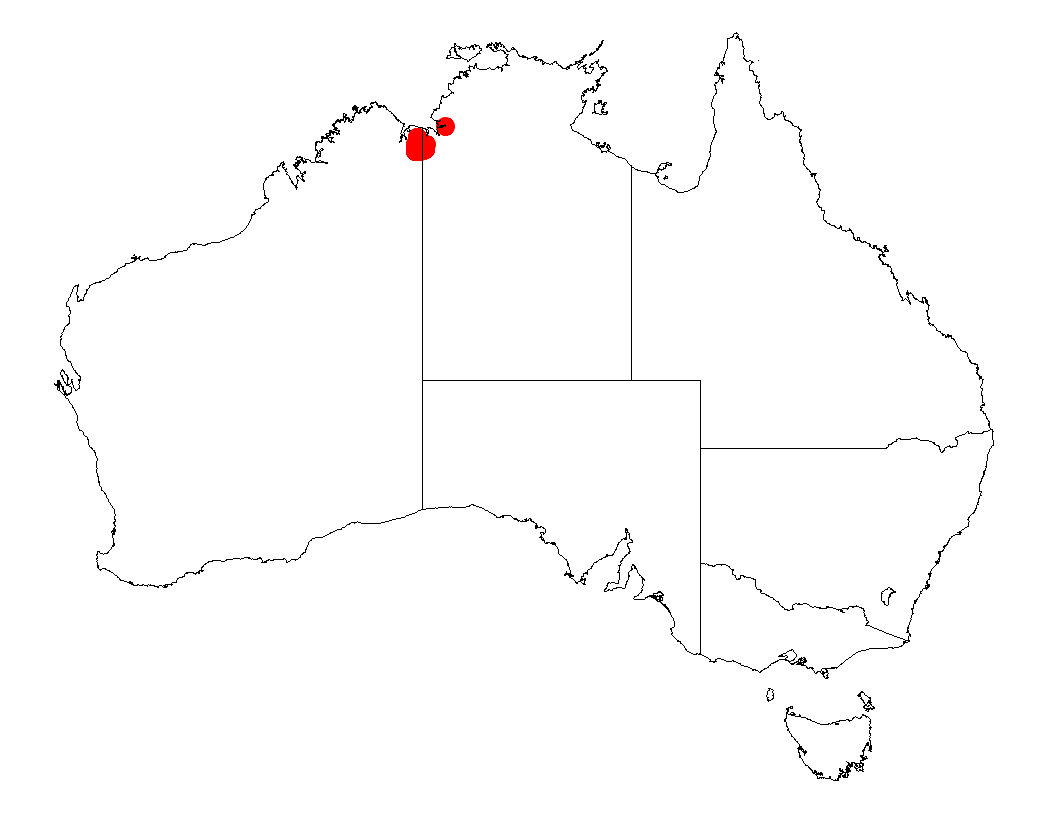
- Occurrence data from AVH

= Acacia richardsii =

Species of legume

Acacia richardsii is a shrub belonging to the genus Acacia and the subgenus Juliflorae that is endemic to north western Australia.

== Description ==
The bushy, rounded shrub typically grows to a height of 1.5 to 4 metres (5 to 13 ft). It has glabrous and resin-ribbed branchlets that are angled towards the apices. Like most species of Acacia it has phyllodes rather than true leaves. The evergreen slightly asymmetric phyllodes have a narrowly elliptic to oblong-elliptic shape and a length of 1.7 to 4 cm (0.67 to 1.57 in) and a width of 4.5 to 9 mm (0.18 to 0.35 in). The phyllodes are quite thin, obtuse and subglaucous and usually have two nerves per face with many barely noticeable minor nerves. It blooms from March to August producing yellow flowers. The simple inflorescences occur singly or in pairs in the axils on stalks that are 5 to 15 mm (0.20 to 0.59 in) in length supporting cylindrical flower-spikes with a length of 2 to 3 cm (0.79 to 1.18 in) and a width of 2 to 4 mm (0.079 to 0.157 in) packed with golden coloured flowers. Following flowering woody, red-brown seed pods form that have a narrowly oblong to linear shape and are narrowed at the base. The resinous pods are up to 8 cm (3.1 in) in length and 4 to 6 mm (0.16 to 0.24 in) wide with oblique longitudinal nerves. The shiny grey to brown seeds inside have an oblong shape with a length of around 4.5 mm (0.18 in) with a turbinate aril.

== Distribution ==
It is native to a small area in the Kimberley region of Western Australia where it is situated on hills, creek beds and in rocky areas where it is found growing in sandstone based soils. It has a limited range from around Kununurra extending eastwards into the top end of the Northern Territory as far as the Keep River National Park.

== See also ==
- List of Acacia species
