= Keep River Important Bird Area =

Important Bird Area in Northern Territory, Australia

Coordinates: 15°58′18″S 129°04′55″E

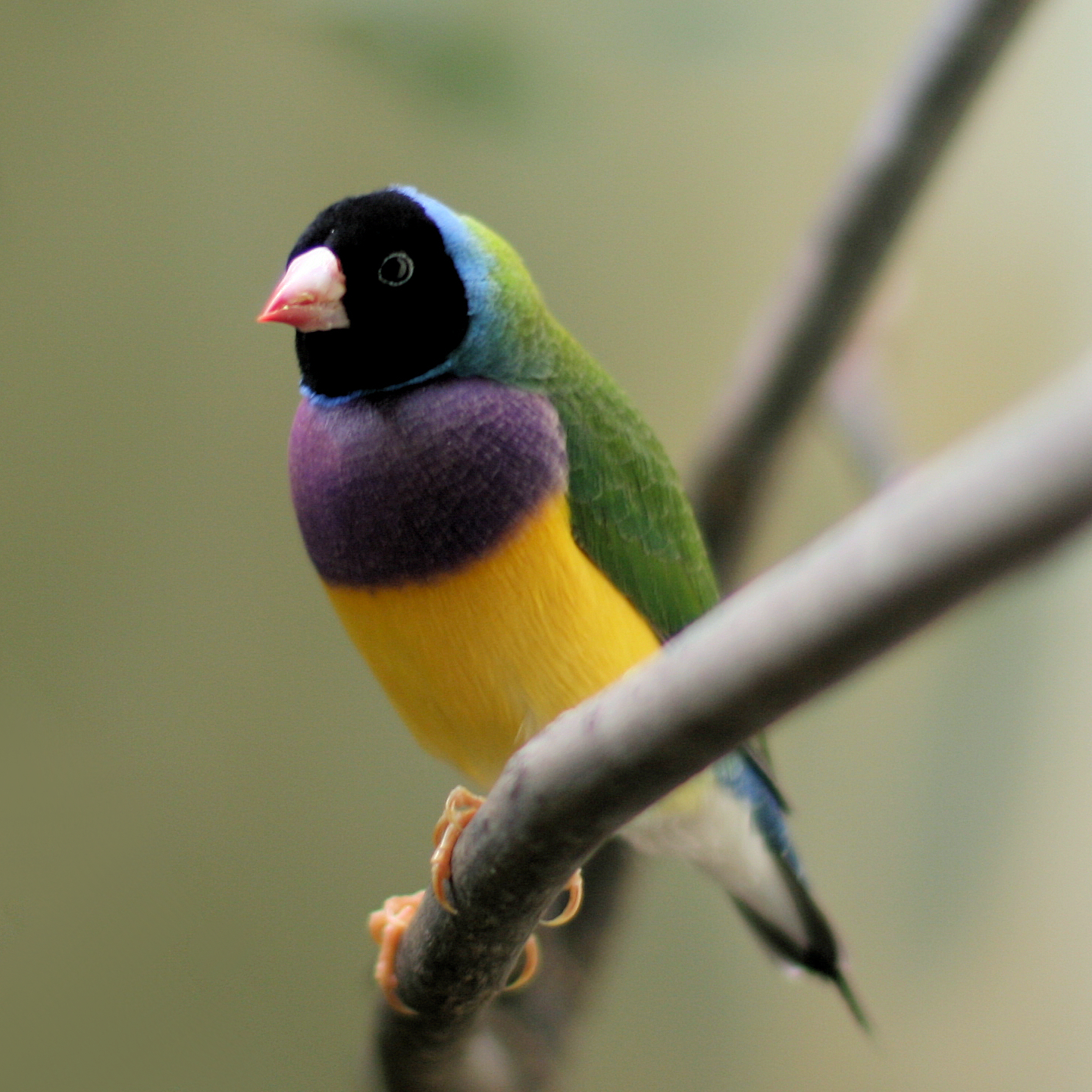
The IBA is an important area for Gouldian finches

The Keep River Important Bird Area is a 983 square kilometres (380 sq mi) tract of land on the upper Keep River straddling the border between Western Australia and the Northern Territory. It lies at an altitude of 150 m (490 ft) to 210 m (690 ft) and is about 400 km (250 mi) south-west of Darwin and 40 km (25 mi) east of Kununurra.

== Description ==
The site is defined by the presence of habitat known to support Gouldian finches. Most of it consists of land within the Keep River National Park and the Newry Station pastoral lease in the Northern Territory, but it also includes some pastoral land in Western Australia. The area is dominated by grassland and by open savanna woodland containing an understorey of native grasses on sandstone. The climate is highly monsoonal, with an average annual rainfall of 873 mm (recorded at Newry Station) falling mainly from December to March. The ranges are drained by a network of ephemeral creeks, with the larger watercourses retaining pools of water through the dry season. As well as the presence of persistent waterholes for drinking, key features of suitable Gouldian finch habitat result from the area's history of low grazing pressure and few widespread hot bushfires, so allowing grasses to seed for the finches to feed on, and providing hollow-bearing trees for them to nest in.

== Birds ==
The site has been identified by BirdLife International as an Important Bird Area (IBA) because it supports a significant population of the endangered Gouldian finch as well as populations of bush stone-curlews, Australian bustards, white-quilled rock-pigeons, varied lorikeets, northern rosellas, white-gaped, yellow-tinted, bar-breasted and banded honeyeaters, silver-crowned friarbirds, sandstone shrike-thrushes, and star, masked and long-tailed finches.
