= Limbunya =

Pastoral lease and cattle station in Northern Territory

Coordinates: 17.231°S 129.888°E

Location in Northern Territory

Limbunya Station is a pastoral lease that operates as a cattle station in the Northern Territory of Australia.

== Location ==
The property is situated approximately 100 kilometres (62 mi) west of the community of Daguragu and 540 kilometres (336 mi) south of Darwin. The property shares a boundary with Waterloo Station to the north and Inverway, Riveren and Bunda Stations to the south. The Daguragu Aboriginal Land Trust bounds Limbunya to the east with the Malngin Aboriginal Land Trust to the west.

== Description ==
Limbunya occupies an area of 5,222 square kilometres (2,016 sq mi) and typically supports a herd of 35,000 cattle. Cattle are raised for the live export trade and shipped out from Darwin to markets in Indonesia, Egypt and the Philippines.

Split up into 21 paddocks ranging in size from 60 hectares (148 acres) to 18,000 hectares (44,479 acres), the property is also equipped with six sets of processing yards. The property has about 750 kilometres (466 mi) of fencing and 300 kilometres (186 mi) of internal roads. Stock are watered by 11 bores and 12 dams as well as numerous springs and creeks situated on the property.

The homestead is composed of three houses, staff kitchen, guest quarters, cooks quarters, social club, workshop and machinery shed. The station has six permanent employees and also employs up to eight life skills participants at any one time.

== History ==
Vestey brothers owned the property in 1928; the property was being run as part of another of their properties, Waterloo Station. The station manager in 1935 was Mr. L. Bumpa. The well known stockman, Sing Poo, was killed at Limbunya in a car accident in 1950. One of the largest bushfires seen in the Territory burned through the area in 1951. The fire front was about 200 miles (322 km) wide and burned about half of Limbunya. About sixty Aboriginal workers walked off the job at Limbunya as part of the Gurindji Strike that started at another Vestey property, Wave Hill Station.

Tony Davis acquired Limbunya in 1996 for an amount less than A$15 million. In 2004 he also added Moroak Station to his portfolio and later placed Limbunya on the market in 2008 where it was expected to fetch A$35 million.

== See also ==
- List of ranches and stations
