= Pine Hill Station (Northern Territory) =

Pastoral lease in the Northern Territory

Coordinates: 22°23′29″S 133°03′01″E

Location in Northern Territory

Pine Hill Station is a pastoral lease that operates as a cattle station in the southern Northern Territory.

== Location ==
It is located about 100 kilometres (62 mi) north of Alice Springs in the Northern Territory.

== History ==
The 268,000 ha (1,030 sq mi) property was sold in 2019 by Filipino banker and property developer Romeo Roxas for A$10 million in early 2019 to South Australian couple Greg and Sharon Vickers who also own properties around Keith as well as Delny and Delmore Downs Stations in the Northern Territory.

Roxas acquired Pine Hill in 2016 after he bought Murray Downs and Epenarra Stations, south-east of Tennant Creek, in 2015 for over A$20 million. All the properties were placed on the market late in 2018

The Native title holders are celebrating the recognition of their rights on the western side of Pine Hill Station, north of Alice Springs.

Five Anmatyerr peoples were awarded native title over 1,500 km^{2} (580 sq mi) of land including the western in a special sitting of the Federal Court on the property in 2018.

== See also ==
- List of ranches and stations
