= Bullwaddy Conservation Reserve =

- IUCN category Ia (strict nature reserve)
- Location within Northern Territory
- Location: Northern Territory
- Nearest city: Elliott
- Coordinates: 16°31′35″S 134°17′3″E
- Area: 115.3 km^{2} (44.5 sq mi)
- Established: 2000
- Governing body: Parks and Wildlife Commission of the Northern Territory

The Bullwaddy Conservation Reserve is a protected area approximately 120 km (75 mi) north east of Elliott in the Northern Territory of Australia.

The Reserve occupies an area of 115.3 square kilometres (11,530 ha).

Amungee Mungee cattle station surrounds the Reserve to the north, south and west. Tanumbirini Station abuts the Reserve to the east. The Reserve is found on the Sturt Plateau and the Carpentaria Highway bounds the property to the north.

The Sturt Plateau has infertile, shallow soils on a lateritic land surface. The area supports large stands of bullwaddy interspersed with dominant areas of lancewood.

The traditional owners of the area are the Alawa and Jingili peoples. The first Europeans to arrive in the area were pastoralists who brought cattle to the surrounding plains.

Near threatened animals that are found in the area include bush stone-curlew, spectacled hare-wallaby and northern nailtail wallaby. Other species of interest include the black-tailed goanna and giant frog.

== See also ==
- Protected areas of the Northern Territory
