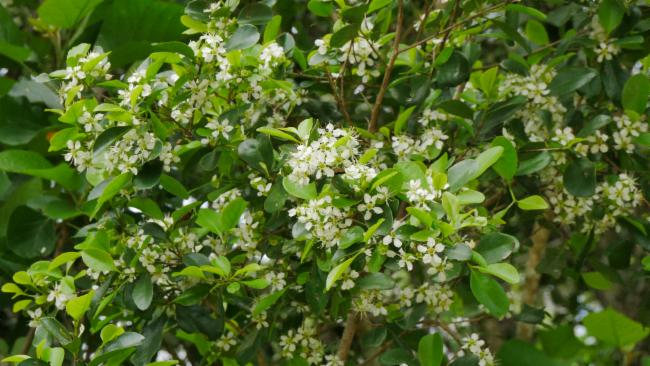
- Macropteranthes fitzalanii

Scientific classification
- Kingdom: Plantae
- Clade: Tracheophytes
- Clade: Angiosperms
- Clade: Eudicots
- Clade: Rosids
- Order: Myrtales
- Family: Combretaceae
- Genus: Macropteranthes; Pedley

Species
- Macropteranthes fitzalanii F.Muell.; Macropteranthes kekwickii F.Muell. ex Benth.; Macropteranthes leichhardtii F.Muell. ex Benth.; Macropteranthes leiocaulis P.I.Forst.; Macropteranthes montana (F.Muell.) F.Muell. ex Benth.

= Macropteranthes =

Genus of shrubs

Macropteranthes is a genus containing five species of woody shrub native to northern Australia.

Four species, M. fitzalanii, M. leichhardtii, M. leiocaulis, and M. montana, are found in Queensland, predominantly along the northeastern coast. M. kekwickii, commonly known as bullwaddy, is found in the Northern Territory.
