= Fortune Agribusiness =

Fortune Agribusiness Funds Management Pty Ltd
- Trade name: Fortune Agribusiness (FortuneAgri)
- Industry: Agriculture
- Key people: Peter Wood, Chairman

Fortune Agribusiness is an agriculture business headquartered in Melbourne, Australia.

== Singleton Horticulture Project ==
It purchased Singleton Station, a 294,900 hectare pastoral lease, located 400 kilometres north of Alice Springs, near the community of Ali Curung, in 2015. In addition to the pastoral operation, Fortune Agribusiness is proposing to create a large-scale fruit farm that it estimates to provide an economic benefit worth about $100 million a year, along with 110 permanent and 1,350 seasonal jobs, although those number have been disputed.

It was granted a free 30-year licence to extract up to 40,000 megalitres of groundwater a year from aquifers under the station by the Northern Territory Government in 2019, the largest ever grant of its kind. This approval involved changed to NT water legislation. The project has facing community opposition including from Traditional Owners, resulting in legal action.
