= Mount McMinn Station =

Pastoral lease in the Northern Territory

Coordinates: 16°11′7″S 134°27′11″E

Location in Northern Territory

Mount McMinn Station is a pastoral lease that operates as a cattle station in the Northern Territory of Australia.

== Location ==
The property is situated approximately 40 km (25 mi) east of Mataranka and about 280 km (170 mi) south east of Katherine at the eastern end of the Savannah Way along the Roper River in the Roper Gulf Region of the Northern Territory.

== Description ==
The property occupies an area of 810 km^{2} (310 sq mi) and has a carrying capacity of 6,000 to 8,000 head of cattle. Both the Roper River and Hodgson River run through the property.

== History ==
The station was acquired by the Cahill family, the founders of Cahill Transport, in 2005 when they bought it from the Mackay family for A$3.55 million. In 2018 the Cahills placed the property on the market when it was stocked with over 3,000 head of Brahman cattle.

== See also ==
- List of ranches and stations
