= Consolidated Pastoral Company =

Agricultural company in Australia

- Type: Private
- Industry: Agriculture
- Founded: 1983
- Headquarters: Newcastle Waters, Australia
- Key people: Troy Setter (CEO)
- Products: Beef cattle and beef
- Owner: Terra Firma
- Number of employees: 170
- Website: pastoral.com

The Consolidated Pastoral Company (CPC) is a large, privately owned, Australian Agrifood business which operates 10 cattle stations covering over 3.6m hectares, managing more than 300,000 cattle, in Western Australia, the Northern Territory and Queensland.

== History ==
CPC was formed in 1983 with the purchase of various holdings in the Northern Territory, including Newcastle Waters Station, from Ashburton Pastoral Company. The Company acquired Isis Downs Station in 1987 at which time the property occupied an area of 1,227 square kilometres (474 sq mi) for an estimated A$10 million. The Company acquired Nockatunga Station in 1990. Consolidated placed Isis Downs on the market in 2003 following a decision by Kerry Packer to focus on beef cattle and meat processing operations. At the time the 2,200 square kilometres (849 sq mi) was stocked with 80,000 merino sheep and 10,000 mixed cattle and was offered for an estimated A$20 million. The sale was not successful and in 2004 the company decided to remove all sheep from the 2,327 square kilometres (898 sq mi) property and introduced cattle instead.

In April 2009 a majority share in CPC was acquired by private equity firm Terra Firma.

Keith Warren resigned as Chief Executive Officer of the company in 2014 citing family reasons after less than one year in the position. Troy Setter took over after joining the company only four months earlier from Australian Agricultural Company.

The company acquired Bunda Station, adjacent to Kirkimbie, in the Victoria River District in the Northern Territory for approximately A$15 million in 2014. The property had been passed in at auction two years earlier for A$10 million.

In March 2025, CPC entered an agreement to purchase Rawlinna Station. In December 2025, CPC purchased Beetaloo Station for more than $300 million.

== Cattle stations ==
- Allawah, Queensland
- Beetaloo, Northern Territory
- Bunda, Northern Territory
- Carlton Hill, Western Australia
- Isis Downs, Queensland
- Kirkimbie, Northern Territory
- Madura Plains, Western Australia
- Newcastle Waters, Northern Territory
- Dungowan, Northern Territory
- Rawlinna, Western Australia
- Vermelha, Northern Territory
- Wrotham Park, Queensland
