= Epenarra Station =

Pastoral lease in the Northern Territory

Coordinates: 20°26′38″S 135°15′32″E

Location in Northern Territory

Pine Hill Station is a pastoral lease that operates as a cattle station on the lower Barkly Tableland in the Northern Territory of Australia.

== Location ==
It is located along the Frew River about 550 kilometres (342 mi) north of Alice Springs and about 120 km (75 mi) east off the Stuart Highway.

== History ==
In 2019, the property was acquired by David and Suzanne Bassingthwaighte from Queensland from Filipino banker and property developer Romeo Roxas, who sold Pine Hill Station at around the same time. The 2,658 km^{2} (1,026 sq mi) property was stocked with approximately 7,400 head of droughtmaster-cross cattle and had been listed at A$16 million. The property is divided into eight paddocks with five sets of outstation yards; it also has thirteen bores along with 40 km (25 mi) of river frontage and seasonal lagoons.

The Wutungurra community was established on 99 ha (240 acres) of land excised from the lease in the early 1980s when the property was owned by the Clough family, who had held the lease since 1952.

The Aboriginal Alyawarre peoples are the traditional owners of the area, having inhabited the area for tens of thousands of years. Europeans arrived in the area in the 1890s using the plains beside the river for cattle grazing.

== See also ==
- List of ranches and stations
