= Terry Underwood =

Australian writer

Marie Therese "Terry" Underwood OAM (born 19 December 1944) is an Australian author who lived on a remote cattle station in the Northern Territory of Australia.

== Early life ==
Underwood was born as Marie Therese Augustus in Albury, New South Wales in 1944. She was "enchanted by the magic of words and the power of the pen" from a young age. As a child she wrote about swagmen and gypsies, saying "I loved writing and some of my poems and short stories". Some of her early work was published in The Catholic Weekly.

Her first introduction to the outback was via her favourite poems, Banjo Paterson's The Man From Snowy River and Henry Lawson's Outback. Through their words, she imagined a place that was evocative, mysterious and compelling. She dreamed of one day living in such a place, “marrying a farmer and penning her own autobiography.” But Underwood's love affair with the outback was cut short when, at the age of eleven, her family moved to Sydney.

== Early love ==
In 1963, at St Vincent's Hospital in Sydney, Underwood nursed her future husband, then who had been admitted with a back injury. “Some say he broke his back to meet me.”

A long-distance courtship by correspondence followed after which the couple were married and set out to start their new life in the outback. "We celebrated our engagement at the Kimberley Hotel, Halls Creek, and were married in Sydney. Then in a red Bedford truck loaded with six tea chests of wedding presents, we drove for days and days to live in a bough shed on the banks of a dry creek bed." Underwood's early fascination with the outback and her childhood dream to marry a farmer had been realised. She was now "a new bride in the middle of nowhere."

== Life in the Northern Territory ==
In 1968, Underwood and her new husband John moved to Riveren, a cattle station in the Victoria River District in the North-west of the Northern Territory. Their home consisted of “a caravan, a bough shed, camp stove and a tent as the master bedroom”.

In her memoir, Underwood celebrates the close connection she felt with the landscape and station life stating “Riveren has captured our bodies, hearts and spirits. It lies within the heart of Australia. How privileged we are to call it home. Riveren is where I belong. I know it would not have worked anywhere else with anyone else. The middle of nowhere has become my everywhere.” Underwood saw many changes in agricultural practice during her four decades at Riveren.

Riveren was subdivided from the Inverway pastoral lease in 1978. In 1988, Bunda Station was subdivided from the western portion of Inverway. In 2007 John Terry and family purchased Inverway back, but eventually sold both stations to an Indonesian company in 2013.

Underwood was named Business Owner in Northern Territory Telstra Business Women's Owner Awards in 1998, Territorian of the Year for the Katherine Region in 1999 and the Chief Minister's Women's Achievement Award in 1999. She then received a Medal of the Order of Australia in 2005.

== Publications ==
- In the middle of nowhere: One woman’s powerful story of love and life on a remote cattle station, 1998, Bantam, Sydney.
- Riveren: My home, Our country, 2000, Bantam, Sydney.
