= Sara Henderson =

Australian writer and pastoralist (1936–2005)

Sara Jane Henderson (15 September 1936 – 29 April 2005) was an Australian pastoralist and author who became an Australia household name after the publication of her autobiography From Strength to Strength in 1993 about rebuilding Bullo River cattle station in the Northern Territory of Australia.

== Life in the Northern Territory ==
Henderson moved to Bullo River Station, 360 kilometres south-west of Darwin with her husband Charles, an American ex-serviceman, and her three daughters, Marlee, Bonnie and Danielle. When Charles died in 1985, the station was more than $750,000 in debt. Henderson and her daughters rebuilt the business, an effort which won her Businesswoman of the Year in 1991. She then published her autobiography From Strength to Strength in 1993 which focused on rebuilding the property after her husband's death.

After deciding to sell the station and retire to Queensland, Henderson and her eldest daughter Marlee Ranacher had a well-publicised falling out. After legal proceedings, Marlee and her husband Franz purchased Bullo River Station in 2001. They later sold it in 2015.

== Later life ==
Henderson became a spokesperson for BreastScreen Australia and urged women over 50 to have regular mammograms to discover breast cancer. In 2000 she discovered that she herself had breast cancer. She died at a hospital in Caloundra in Queensland on 29 April 2005 from leukaemia.

== Bibliography ==
- From Strength to Strength (1992)
- The Strength in Us All (1994)
- Outback Wisdom: Sara Looks at Life (1995)
- Some of My Friends Have Tails (1995)
- A Year at Bullo (1997)
- The Strength of Our Dreams, (1998)
