= Frew River =

Frew
- Location of the Dry River mouth in the Northern Territory

Location
- Country: Australia
- Territory: Northern Territory
- Region: Barkly Tableland

Physical characteristics
- Source
  - location: Davenport Range
  - elevation: 436 m (1,430 ft)
- Mouth
  - location: Walkabout Creek
  - coordinates: 20°16′28″S 135°33′20″E
  - elevation: 273 m (896 ft)
- Length: 271 km (168 mi)

The Frew River is an ephemeral river in the Northern Territory of Australia.

The headwaters of the river are located in the Davenport Range near the southern boundary of the Iytwelepenty / Davenport Range National Park and the river flows in a northerly direction through the park passing through a series of waterholes including; Junction Waterhole, Old Police Station Waterhole, Burrabelly Waterhole, Rooney Waterhole and Woodenjerrie Waterhole and eventually discharges in Walkabout Creek.

The only tributaries to the creek are Lennee Creek and Mia Mia Creek.

Epenarra Station has 40 km (25 mi) of river frontage including some seasonal lagoons along Frew River.

The Indigenous Alyawarre peoples are the traditional owners of the area, having inhabited the area for tens of thousands of years. Europeans arrived in the area in the 1890s using the plains beside the river for cattle grazing.

== See also ==
- List of rivers of Australia § Northern Territory
