= Arnold River (Northern Territory) =

Arnold
- Location of the Arnold River mouth in the Northern Territory
- Etymology: Richard Aldous Arnold

Location
- Country: Australia
- Territory: Northern Territory

Physical characteristics
- Source: northeast of the Bullwaddy Conservation Reserve
  - coordinates: 16°18′21″S 134°8′40″E
  - elevation: 262 m (860 ft)
- Mouth: Hodgson River
  - location: south of Hodgson Downs
  - coordinates: 15°21′48″S 134°8′47″E
  - elevation: 74 m (243 ft)
- Length: 185.8 km (115.5 mi)

Basin features
- River system: Roper River
- Tributaries
  - right: Williams Creek (Northern Territory), Horse Creek (Northern Territory)

The Arnold River is a river in the north of the Northern Territory of Australia.

== Course and features ==
The Arnold River rises about 30 kilometres (19 mi) northeast of the Bullwaddy Conservation Reserve and north of the Carpentaria Highway. It flows to the town Minamia (Cox River) in the Aboriginal reserve Alawa and then turns northwest and flows about 15 kilometres (9.3 mi) south of Hodgson Downs in the Hodgson River. The river is joined by two tributaries including the Williams and Horse creeks and flows through a series of lagoons and waterholes before reaching its river mouth.

== Etymology ==
The river is named for Richard Aldous Arnold, a pastoralist and politician, who purchased a pastoral lease in the area in 1895. The lease was a part of the Hodgson Downs cattle station. He sold his interest in 1905 and continued his political career as Clerk of the Legislative Assembly of New South Wales.

== See also ==
- List of rivers of Australia § Northern Territory
