= Marlee Ranacher =

Australian author

Marlee Ranacher is an Australian author. She is also a cancer survivor, wife, mother of two sons, pilot, cook, Bull catcher and cattle musterer, bulldozer driver and accomplished horsewoman. She lives with her Austrian-born husband Franz and two sons, Ben and Franz. Ranacher's LinkedIn profile lists her as 'Director' of 'Farming' 'Industry' located in the Northern Territory of Australia.

== Early life ==
Ranacher is the eldest daughter of American ex-serviceman, Charles and his wife, acclaimed author Sara Henderson, and was raised on the remote top-end cattle station Bullo River in the Victoria River District of the Northern Territory of Australia. She and husband Franz acquired the property in March 2001 from her mother after a legal battle documented on the ABC's Australian Story 2001. The Ranachers hoped to create a unique ecotourism destination at Bullo River.

== Life in the Northern Territory ==
Bullo River was put on the market for the first time in 2011, amidst the fallout from Indonesian live cattle export bans. An interview with Ranacher was broadcast on the Nine Network's 60 Minutes program about the effect of the Gillard government's bans. This prompted the August 2011 Cattlemen's drive to Canberra from Perth and Cairns.

In early 2012, Ranacher's small Cessna airplane's engine failed while she was searching for cattle on the Victoria River floodplain; forcing her to land wheels up on a mud bank of a three kilometer wide river with a fast incoming tide of 7.5 meters. She struggled through the mud, then swam 500 meters to the riverbank. Ranacher later said "our bad fortune losing the plane was in fact good fortune". Ranacher received an insurance payout from the crash of the Cessna and she said that this enabled them to hang on, though tenuously, until later in the year when with a second bit of luck they were able to sell floodplain cattle for a good price. "It gave us the option of turning away offers for Bullo that didn't meet our benchmark". Bullo was put on the market for the second time, and sold for $9-$10 million in 2016.

== Writing ==
Ranacher's first book Bullo: The Next Generation is biographical and conveys her deep love and connection for her home and land and details the hardships of both the bush and those between family members; culminating in the acrimonious court battle with mother Sara Henderson over the future of Bullo.

A review of Bullo: The Next Generation emphasizes Ranacher's business wisdom and entrepreneurial spirit; along with her appreciation of nature and the complexities of outback life in Australia. It is obvious Ranacher was not a struggling station owner, but a wise business person making deliberate business decisions.

Cover photographs for Bullo: The Next Generation were by David Hancock, SKyscans.

== Publications ==
- Henderson, S., illustrated by Ranacher M. (1995). Some of My Friends have Tails, Pan Macmillan: Sydney, ISBN 0732908175
- Ranacher, M. (2003). Bullo: The Next Generation Random House Australia Pty Ltd: Sydney, New York, Toronto, London, Auckland, Johannesburg, ISBN 1740511557
- Ranacher, M. (2016). Bullo: Sequel, Bantam: North Sydney, ISBN 9780857984449
