= Avon Downs Station =

Pastoral lease in the Northern Territory

Coordinates: 20°01′22″S 137°29′08″E

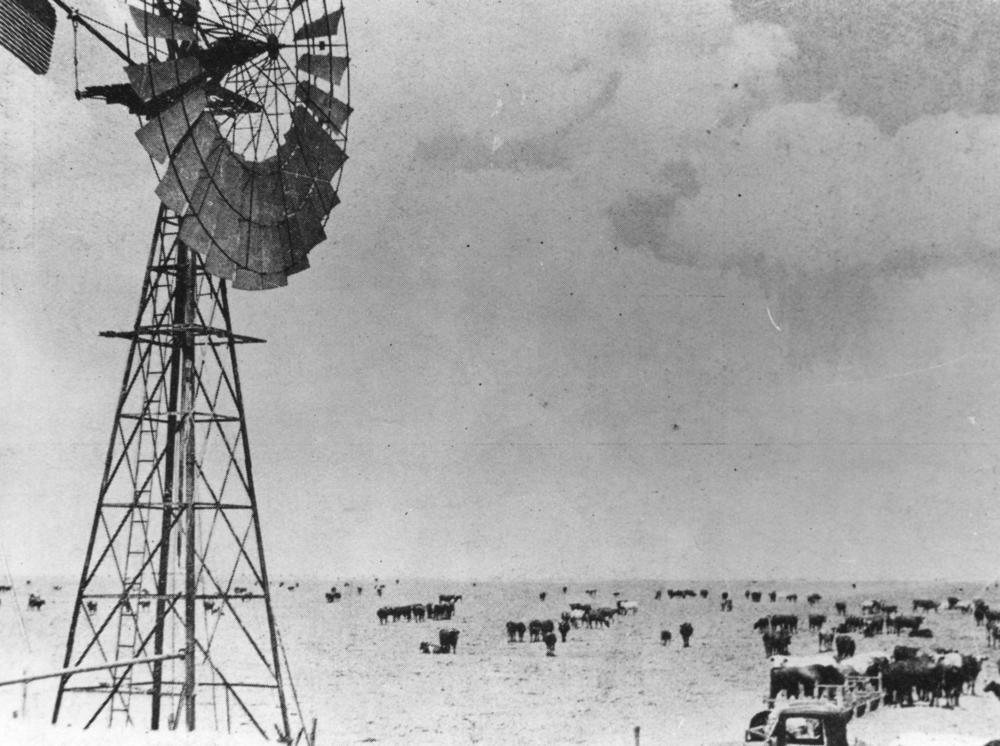
Avon Downs Station, 1939

Avon Downs is a pastoral station on the Barkly Tableland in the Northern Territory of Australia. It is located 260 kilometres northwest of Mount Isa.

== Early history ==
Indigenous people have lived in the Barkly region for thousands of years. The first European to enter the area was William Landsborough in 1861. He reported the pastoral potential of the region describing it as the "finest pastoral country he had ever seen".

In 1866, John and James Ranken, two cousins from old pastoral families in New South Wales, herded 4,000 sheep to the area from Queensland's Mackay district, escaping severe drought. They settled in the area now known as Avon Downs. Three watercourses are named after them, the Ranken River, James River and Lorne Creek. Other pastoralists moved to the area throughout the 1860s, but poor wool prices caused the Rankens and others to abandon the area.

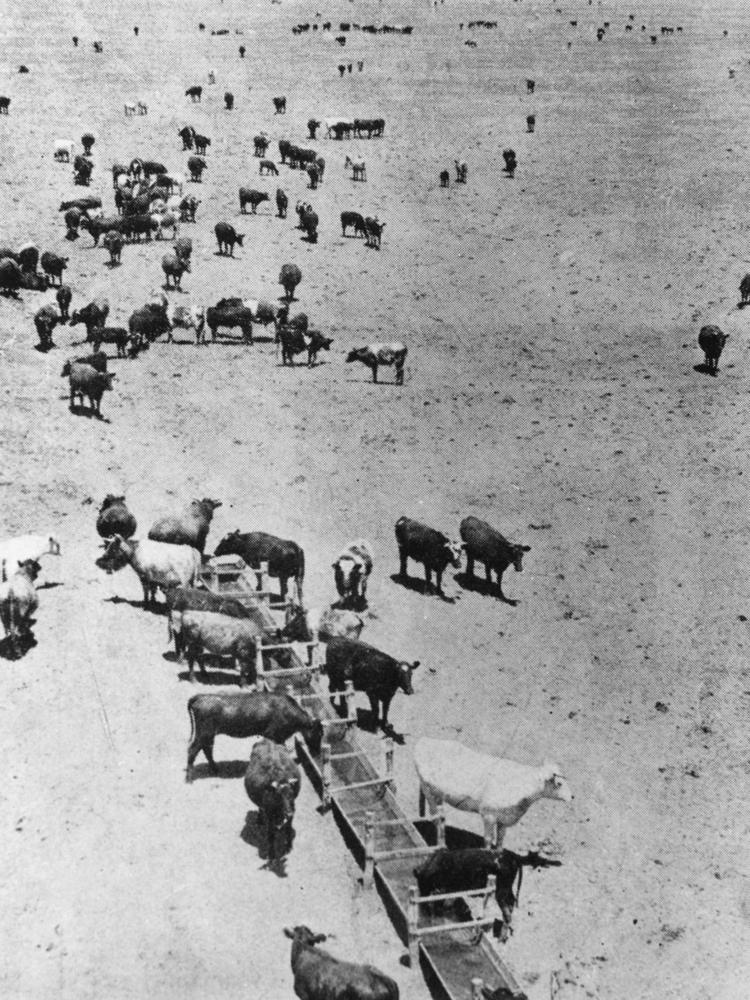

In 1882 Thomas Guthrie purchased 1920 square km of the Barkly, expanding that later to more than 3600 square km, naming it Avon Downs after his merino stud 'Rich Avon' in Victoria. It took 12 months to transport the first sheep to the station. Within three decades he developed the property to have a carrying capacity of 70,000 merinos. The station was sold in 1921 to the Peel River Company.

== Recent history ==
Avon Downs is now owned by the Australian Agricultural Company and is managed by Adam and Jordyn Ballantine.
