= Riveren =

Pastoral lease in the Northern Territory

Coordinates: 17.904°S 130.227°E

Location in the Northern Territory

Riveren Station is a pastoral lease that operates as a cattle station in the Northern Territory of Australia.

Situated approximately 84 kilometres (52 mi) north west of Lajamanu and 83 kilometres (52 mi) south west of Daguragu in the Victoria River district, the property was originally part of Inverway Station, which was carved up into Inverway, Bunda and Riveren Stations. All of the holdings are situated in the headwaters of the Victoria River. The property shares a boundary with Inverway to the east, Limbunya Station to the north, Birrindudu to the south and the Daguragu Aboriginal Land Trust to the east.

The country is a mix of black soil plains covered with pastures of Mitchell grass, Queensland blue and silky brown top grasses. The red dirt country supports stands of spinifex.

The station occupies an area of 3,016 square kilometres (1,164 sq mi), and in 2012 was carrying a mixed herd of approximately 23,000 cattle.

Mick and Georgia Underwood sold the property in a private sale along with Inverway Station in 2013 to the Indonesian company Japfa Santori for an estimated A$35 million. The decision came following live export ban on livestock by the Gillard government in 2011. The station had been passed in at auction in 2012 for A$19 million.

Terry Underwood wrote about Riveren in her memoirs, In The Middle of Nowhere and Riveren: My home, Our country.

== See also ==
- List of ranches and stations
