= Bullo River Station =

Pastoral lease in the Northern Territory

Coordinates: 15.421°S 129.826°E

Location in the Northern Territory

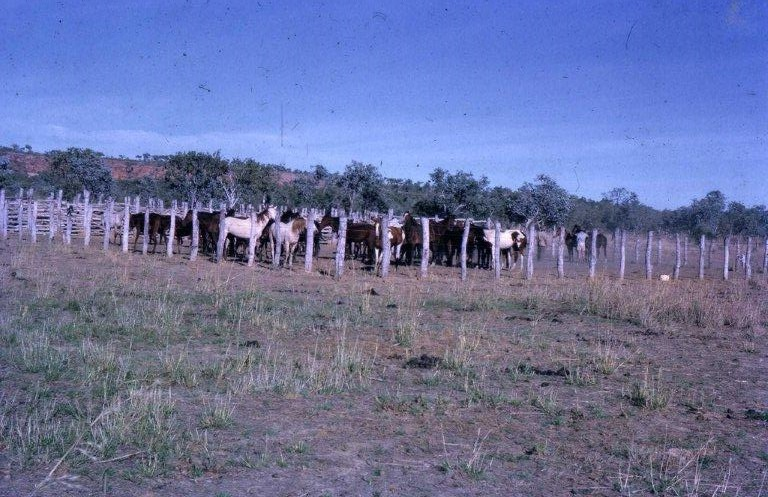
Stockyards on Bullo River Valley - 1962

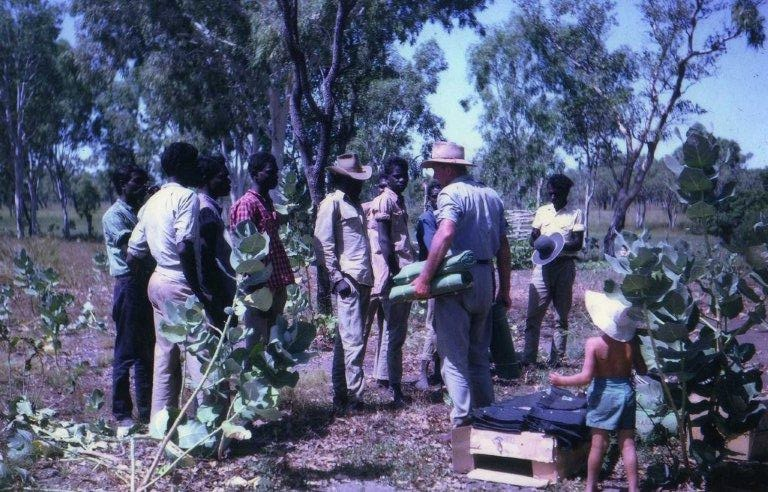
Raymond Locke supplying the stockman on Bullo River Valley - 1962

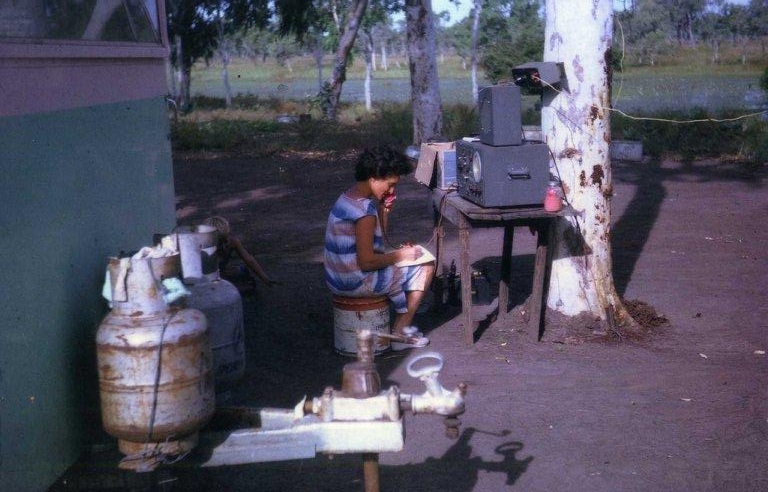
Barbra Locke chairing a C.W.A Meeting of the Air in the Kimberleys

Bullo River Station also once known as Bullo River Valley Station, is a pastoral lease that operates as a cattle station in the Northern Territory of Australia.

Situated close to the border of Western Australia, approximately 78 kilometres (48 mi) north west of Timber Creek and 115 kilometres (71 mi) north east of Kununurra. The Victoria River flows through the property. It is bounded by Newry Station and Auvergne Station to the south and by Spirit Hills Station to the north and west, and lies on the traditional lands of the Mariu people.

The property occupies an area of 1,627 square kilometres (628 sq mi) and can support a herd of over 9,000 heads of Brahman cattle.

The property was established by Raymond Locke who was granted the lease for the area in June 1960 under Pastoral Lease No. 568 over 1,362 square miles (3,528 km^{2}). The lease was known as Bullo River Valley Station and was pioneered by Raymond and Barbara Locke. The Locke family established bores and fencing and had a herd of over 1,000 Shorthorn cattle. They also had an airstrip constructed at a cost of 1,200 pounds.

Barbara Locke also served as the President of the Country Women's Association - Ord Valley Air Branch during her time at Bullo.

Bullo River was owned by the author Sara Henderson and her husband, an American, Charles Henderson. The Hendersons acquired the property in 1963 from the Lockes and moved to Bullo River the same year, Charles died in 1986 and Sara took over running the property with the help of her three daughters.

In 2001 Henderson's oldest daughter, Marlee Ranacher and her husband Franz acquired Bulloo from her mother following a legal battle.

In 2011 the property was struggling following the live export ban imposed by the Gillard government. Marlee Ranacher led a protest group to Canberra then returned to Bulloo to place the property on the market. Shortly afterwards while aerial mustering her plane's engine failed and she crash landed on a mud-flat before having to swim ashore and activating an emergency beacon. Authorities contacted her husband who picked her up in his helicopter. The insurance paid out on the plane kept the property afloat until market conditions improved.

The station was sold in 2015 to Grant Farris who paid A$9.5 million for both the leasehold and 7,000 head of cattle. Farris and his partner, Grant McLeary, announced they would be spending another A$1 million to redevelop the property for both cattle and tourism.

== See also ==
- List of ranches and stations
