= Newry Station =

Pastoral lease in Northern Territory, Australia

Coordinates: 15°58′S 129°05′E

Location in the Northern Territory

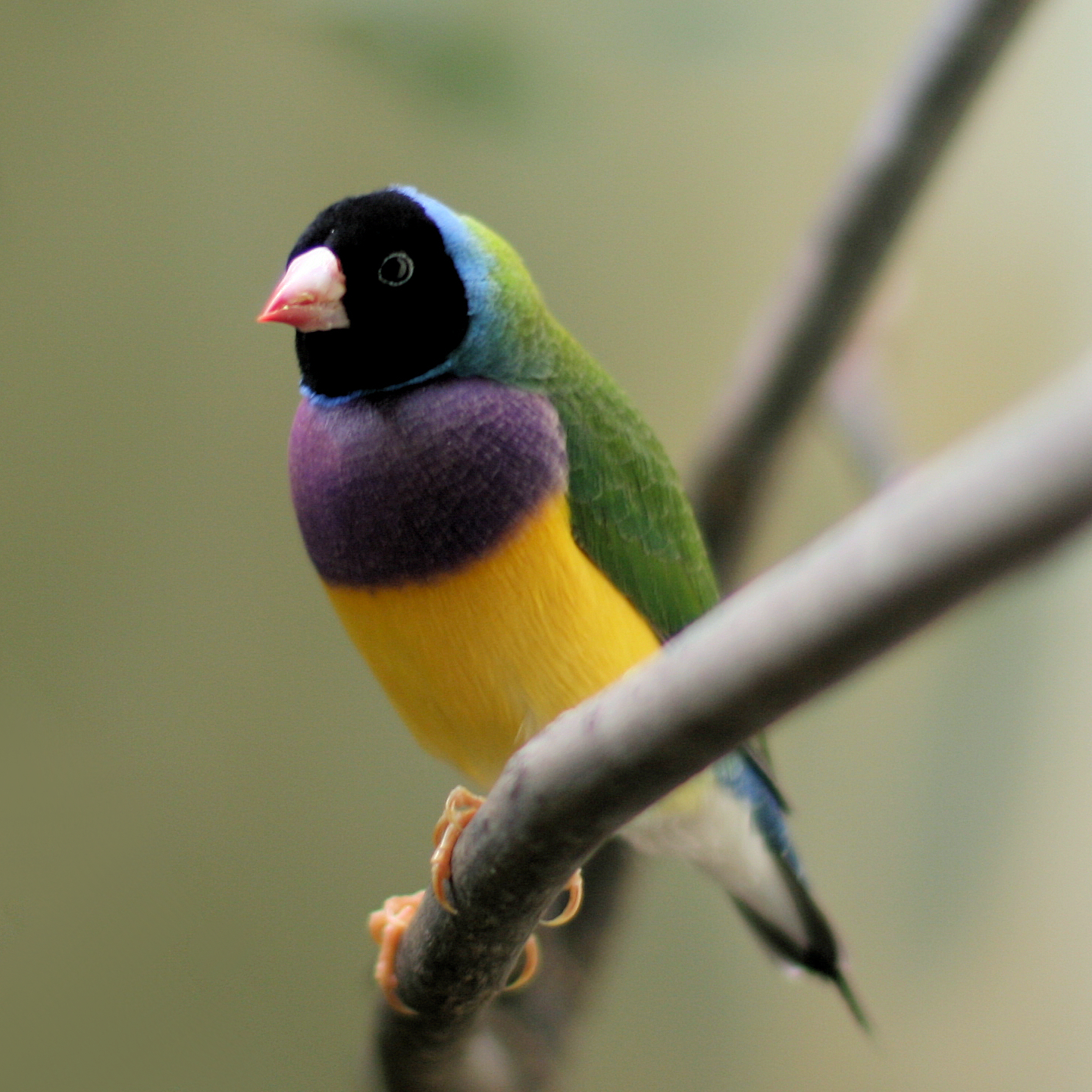
The property is an important area for Gouldian finches

Newry Station is a 2,500-square-kilometre (965 sq mi) pastoral lease in the Northern Territory of Australia. It adjoins the Territory's border with Western Australia and is operated as a cattle station by the Consolidated Pastoral Company (CPC).

== Description ==
The station contains black soil, forest and stony ridge country. It carries 15,000 head of cattle, turning off 4,000 head of weaner steers and spayed heifers annually. The cattle are trucked to Argyle Downs, operated by the same company, eventually entering the live export trade to Southeast Asian markets. The property bounded to the east by Auvergne Station.

== History ==
Named after the Irish port of Newry, the property was first taken up in 1886, with a homestead built on the banks of the Keep River. Cattle were introduced after the lease was bought by pastoralist Patrick Durack who spent two years droving a herd of 7,000 cattle and horses 5,000 km across northern Australia to the Ord River region where they established several cattle stations.

By 1901 the station, along with Argyle and Auvergne, was carrying about 45,000 head of cattle.

The property remained with the Durack family until 1950 when it was sold to the Australian Agricultural Company. AAC introduced Santa Gertrudis cattle, before achieving better results through crossing Brahmans with Kimberley Shorthorns. In 1986 it was bought by the Baines River Cattle Company. It was eventually purchased, along with other properties, by CPC in 1992.

A deposit of rare zebra rock was found on the station in 2011, which was mined by the Kimberley Stone company. Employing a workforce of two, the company used low impact mining to extract the stone for local markets. In June 2017, the company announced it would be closing operations to protect the site for future generations.

== Conservation ==
Much of the pastoral lease lies within the Keep River Important Bird Area, so classified because of the importance of its habitats for conservation of the endangered Gouldian finch. A 400 ha site within the property – the Newry Station Gouldian finch site – is listed on Australia's Register of the National Estate.

== See also ==
- List of ranches and stations
