= Keep River =

River in the Northern Territory and Western Australia

Keep
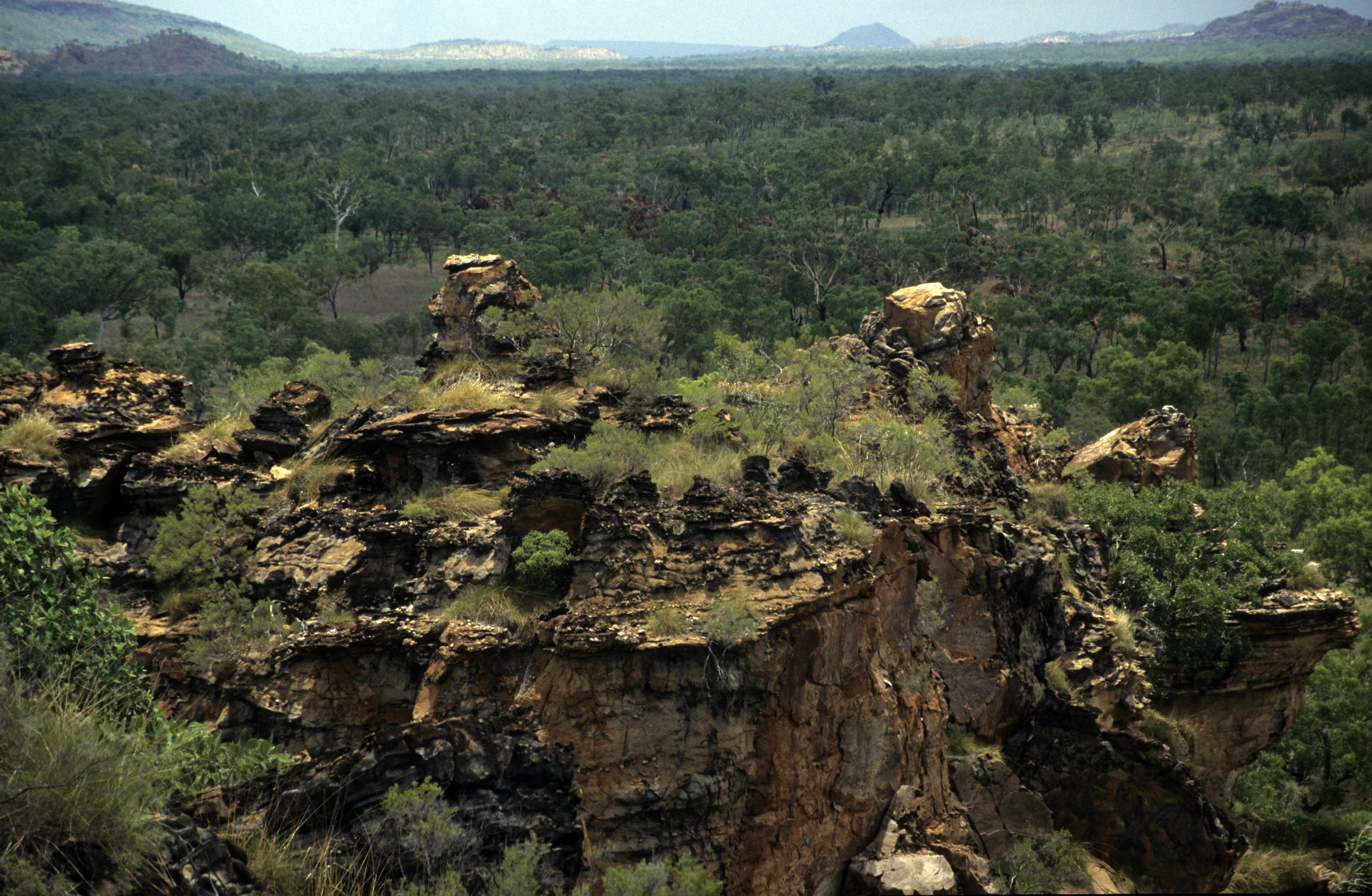

- Location of the Keep River mouth in the Northern Territory
- Etymology: Henry Francis Keep

Location
- Country: Australia
- Territory: Northern Territory Western Australia
- Region: Victoria Bonaparte (IBRA)

Physical characteristics
- Source
  - elevation: 132 m (433 ft)
- Mouth
  - coordinates: 15°08′45″S 129°12′9″E
  - elevation: 0 m (0 ft)
- Length: 258 km (160 mi)
- Discharge
  - average: 15.8 m^{3}/s (560 cu ft/s)

Basin features
- Tributaries
  - left: Moriarty Creek, Dingo Creek, Knox Creek, Oakes Creek
  - right: Alligator Creek, Chinaman Creek, Flying Fox Creek

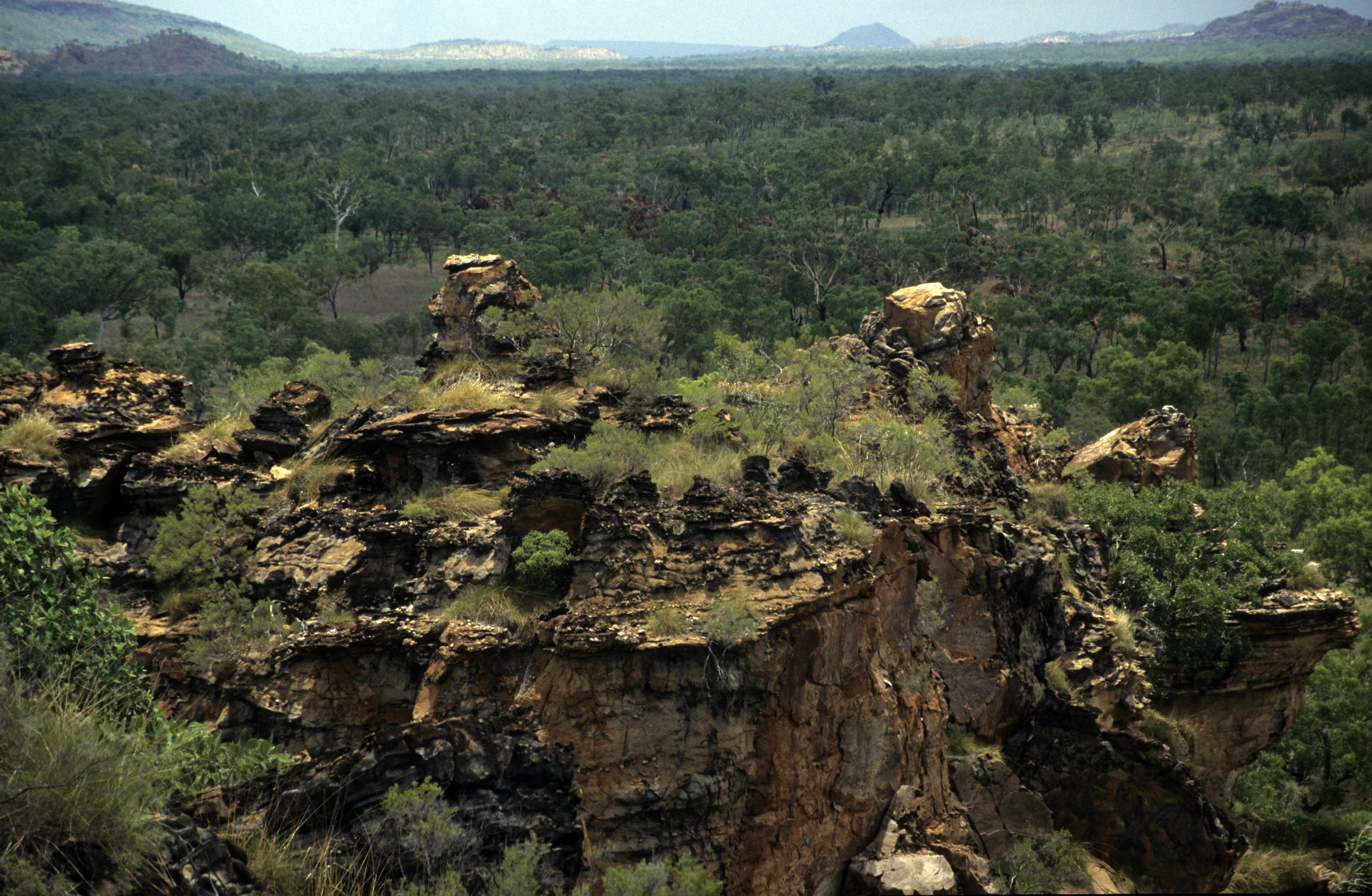
Keep River National Park, view from Gurrandalng

The Keep River is a river in the Victoria Bonaparte bioregion of Western Australia and the Northern Territory in Australia.

== Location and features ==
The river rises just south of the Newry Station homestead then flows in a northerly direction crossing the Victoria Highway and then flowing through the Keep River National Park and veering westward across the border into Western Australia then veering east back into the Northern Territory. It then continues north before discharging into the Joseph Bonaparte Gulf and the Timor Sea.

The river catchment occupies an area of 6,003 square kilometres (2,318 sq mi) and is wedged between the Ord River catchment to the west and the Victoria River catchment to the east. The river has a mean annual outflow of 500 gigalitres (654,000,000 cu yd).

Important wetlands are found in the lower reaches of the river, forming suitable habitat for waterfowl breeding colonies and roosting sites for migratory shorebirds. Large areas of rice-grass floodplain grasslands are also found along the river.

The estuary formed at the river mouth is in near pristine condition. It occupies an area of 230 square kilometres (89 sq mi) of open water. It is tide dominated in nature with a tide dominated delta having multiple channels and is surrounded by an area of 55.5 square kilometres (21 sq mi) covered with mangroves.

== Flora and fauna ==
Riparian vegetation found along the margins in the river include Melaleuca, Barringtonia acutangula, Nauclea orientalis, reeds and taro are common in the upper reaches. In pools along the river sponges such as Spongillidae can be found on rocks. Toward the national park area aquatic vegetation such as species of Nymphea, Hydrilla verticillata and species of Chara become more frequent forming dense mats in some areas. Riparian vegetation includes Melaleuca, Barringtonia acutangula, Nauclea orientalis, Lysiphyllum cunninghamii and Pandanus spiralis.

Marine fauna found along the river include fish including freshwater sawfish, dwarf wawfish, ox-eye herring, bony bream, short-tail thryssa, several species of catfish such as Arius and Anodontiglanis dahli, freshwater longtom, species of rainbowfish, hardeyheads, species of glassfish, species of grunter, species of mullet, spotted archerfish, species of gudgeon, species of goby and barramundi.

In February 2022, the Northern Territory Land Corporation released 67,500 hectares for a planned conversion of the landscape towards the cultivation of rice, cotton and various fruits like mangoes and bananas. The effects of this major project on the natural ecology and Aboriginal sacred sites are not yet known.

== History ==
The traditional owners of the area are the Kadjerong and Duulngari peoples to the northern end and the Miriwoong people to the south.

The origin of the name is not known but it is thought to have been named for Henry Francis Keep who was a store keeper in Wyndham. The first written record of the name was in the diary of explorer and pastoralist, Michael Durack, who wrote about a "trip to Keep River" in 1894.

== See also ==
- List of rivers of Australia § Northern Territory
