= Kirkimbie =

Pastoral lease in the Northern Territory

Coordinates: 17.733°S 129.243°E

Location in the Northern Territory

Kirkimbie Station is a pastoral lease that operates as a cattle station in the Northern Territory of Australia.

It is situated approximately 162 kilometres (101 mi) west of Lajamanu and 177 kilometres (110 mi) north east of Halls Creek near the border with Western Australia.

The property occupies an area of 2,300 square kilometres (888 sq mi) and is composed of a mix of black soil plains covered in Mitchell and Flinders grass and red country that supports spinifex. It can support a herd of approximately 11,000 head of cattle and has an annual turn-off of about 5,500 head.

The property was owned by Vestey Group in the 1960s and was acquired by Consolidated Pastoral Company in 1986. Another of the company's properties, Bunda Station, acquired in 2014 borders Kirkimbie.

== See also ==
- List of ranches and stations
