= Singleton Station =

Pastoral lease in the Northern Territory, Australia

Singleton Station is a pastoral lease in Central Australia, in the Northern Territory of Australia.

== History ==
Singleton Station is located on the traditional lands of the Kaytetye people, located 400 kilometres north of Alice Springs, near the community of Ali Curung.

It is now a 294,000 hectare pastoral property. The pastoral lease has been held by Fortune Agribusiness since 2016.

== Water licence controversy ==
In September 2020, Fortune Agribusiness applied for a water licence to develop one of Australia's largest fruit and vegetable farms over 3500-hectares of Singleton Station at a cost of $150 million. In April 2021, the Northern Territory Government issued the 40,000 megalitre licence, the largest ever groundwater extraction licence ever granted in the Northern Territory. Based on the scale, the project is the first agricultural project in Northern Territory history that is required to undergo a Tier 3 Environment Impact Statement before the commencement of development, expected to take many years.

Traditional owners of the area oppose the project based on the risks to water supplies and the 40 sacred cultural sites within the drawdown area. As the region is a shallow groundwater landscape, there are concerns the drawdown could see the lowering of the groundwater table by between 5 and 50 metres across a 50-kilometre radius, affecting groundwater dependent trees, springs, and soaks on the surface. These concerns led to a formal review process but the licence was regranted in November 2021 with additional conditions. Ongoing advocacy has led to the Water Justice Project, a community-led storytelling collaboration between Running Water Community Press, Arlpwe Art and Culture Centre and the Arid Lands Environment Centre (ALEC).

In February 2022, the Mpwerempwer Aboriginal Corporation and ALEC announced it had served claims against the Northern Territory Government and Fortune Agribusiness on the basis that Environment Minister Eva Lawler made a number of legal errors and had not followed the Water Act in approving the licence. It was dismissed in February 2024, citing that ALEC had not established an abuse of power by the Minister. Fortune Agribusiness must now complete an environmental impact statement before it can progress the development which is expected in late 2025. Whilst ALEC decided not to appeal, the Mpwerempwer Aboriginal Corporation have decided to appeal the outcome represented by the Central Land Council.
