= Beetaloo =

Pastoral lease in the Northern Territory

Coordinates: 17.216°S 133.802°E

Location in the Northern Territory

Beetaloo is the name of a pastoral lease that operates as a cattle station in the Northern Territory, known as Beetaloo Station. It is also the name of an area in the Sturt Plateau, known as the Beetaloo Sub-Basin or Beetaloo Basin, around 500 kilometres (310 mi) south-east of Darwin, between Mataranka to the north and Elliott to the south. This area is rich in natural gas, which can be exploited by fracking, which has caused controversy.

== Beetaloo Station ==
Beetaloo Station is situated about 48 kilometres (30 mi) north east of Elliott and 295 kilometres (183 mi) south west of Borroloola. The property currently occupies an area of 10,500 square kilometres (4,054 sq mi). It is surrounded by other pastoral leases including Hayfield, Amungee Mungee and Tanumbirini Stations to the north, Hayfield and Newcastle Waters Station to the west, Tandyidgee, Ucharonidge and Mungabroom to the south and the Mambilya-Rrumburriya Aboriginal Land Trust to the east. The Carpentaria Highway crosses the property through the north east corner and the Newcastle Creek flows through a good portion of the lease from east to west.

The station was established in the 1890s by Harry M. Bathern, who had overlanded cattle to many other properties in the Territory including Brunette Downs, Eva Downs and Emu Downs. When Bathern died in 1928 the property occupied an area of 3,000 square miles (7,770 km^{2}).

Several bushfires in 1951 burnt out a total of 5,000 square miles (12,950 km^{2}) across Beetaloo and neighbouring Newcastle Waters stations, with Beetaloo reported to be one of the worst affected. Compounding the immediate loss of stock and grazing pasture, drought followed the fires, leading to further losses of the surviving stock. The manager, Wally Bathern, expressed concern that when the wet season arrived, bogs would form around waterholes and the weakened cattle were at risk of becoming stuck.

In 2002, the station was purchased by the Dunnicliff-Armstrong family for A$20 million.

In December 2025, Beetaloo Station was purchased by Consolidated Pastoral Company (CPC) for more than $300 million.

== Beetaloo Sub-basin ==
The Beetaloo Sub-basin, is situated in the Sturt Plateau region, between Mataranka to the north and Elliott to the south. It covers an area of approximately 2,800,000 hectares about 500 kilometres south-east of Darwin. The Beetaloo Sub-basin is a structural component of the greater McArthur Basin. The McArthur Basin covers a range of Proterozoic sedimentary rock formations that range from the northern part of the Northern Territory from north-east Western Australia to north-west Queensland.

The Beetaloo Sub-basin is prospective for unconventional hydrocarbons. It is estimated to contain significant amounts of recoverable shale gas, tight gas and shale oil resources. Petroleum exploration in the Beetaloo area first began in 1984 when CRA Exploration Pty Limited took up acreage in exploration permits EP4 and EP5 (since lapsed), north of the core of the Beetaloo. Exploration for shale resources was revitalized in 2015 when Origin Energy drilled two vertical exploration wells (Kalala S-l and Amungee NW-l) and one horizontal well (Amungee NV/-IH). The Australian Government is actively facilitating fracking in the Northern Territory, allocating more than $1.5 billion in taxpayer funds to subsidise a petrochemical and gas export hub in Darwin Harbour—aimed at generating demand and building export infrastructure for fracked gas from the Beetaloo Basin.

On 14 September 2016 the Northern Territory Government announced a scientific inquiry into hydraulic fracturing of onshore unconventional reservoirs in the Northern Territory under the Inquiries Act (NT). This inquiry was led by Justice Rachel Pepper and supported by a panel of independent experts. Following 15 months of investigating the issue, the inquiry found the risks of fracking could be reduced to acceptable levels if 135 recommendations were implemented in full.

Economic modelling by the industry found that the development of the Beetaloo basin could "create more than 6500 full-time jobs and positive economic impacts of up to $2.8 billion for the Northern Territory and over $9 billion for Australia as a whole over 25 years". However, many members of the community, pastoralists and traditional Aboriginal caretakers of the land continue to raise concerns that rivers and water sources in the region could be polluted by the waste produced by hydraulic fracturing.

The Indigenous rangers working in the new Mimal Indigenous Protected Area are very concerned about the level of greenhouse gases that would be released by the fracking work, potentially jeopardising Australia's Paris emissions reduction target.

In June 2022, Beetaloo traditional owners shared their frustration at anti-fracking activists who they believe are "interfering" on country, stating they "want to work together with (Northern Land Council) and this mining company to protect our country, and our sacred sites."

A Strategic Regional Environmental and Baseline Assessment report released in 2023 found that the basin contains one of the world's richest ant populations and threatened species, including the Gouldian finch and the yellow-spotted monitor.

On 3 May 2023 the Northern Territory government announced the finalisation of the recommendations of the independent Scientific Inquiry into Hydraulic Fracturing of Onshore Unconventional Reservoirs in the Northern Territory. This paves the way for companies to apply for the approval of full-scale production in the basin. On the same day the Australia Institute published an open letter with 100 scientists and prominent people in national newspapers urging the Northern Territory government not to allow fracking due to climate change risks. Given the serious concerns over the health impacts of both fracking and petrochemical processing on local populations, over 300 health professionals agreeing fracking must be banned due to its health impacts.

The Australia Institute has stated that the Beetaloo Sub-basin pilot stage alone could produce 7 million tonnes of greenhouse gas emissions per year. This analysis highlights that the gas industry in the Beetaloo Basin is unlikely to develop without substantial public subsidies. It also raises concerns about the implementation of recommendations from the Pepper Inquiry, particularly regarding the provision of independent information to Aboriginal communities.

In regards to the proposed Tamboran NT LNG Facility LNG facility associated with the Beetaloo Basin could result in emissions equivalent to those of multiple coal-fired power stations, posing significant challenges to Australia's climate commitments. In terms of the Economic Impacts of Gas Development in the Northern Territory, the net employment impact of the Beetaloo Basin project across Australia would be negligible, as job gains in the gas industry could be offset by losses in other sectors.

=== Back Beetaloo campaign ===
"Back Beetaloo" is a campaign movement established online in early September 2021. The campaign's aim is to "Tell the Federal and Territory Governments to unlock the Beetaloo Basin to benefit all Australians." The website domain for Back Beetaloo was registered by Nick Palmer and his company Campaign Digital from Cherrybrook in Sydney's north-west. The website has since been accused of astroturfing. It was reported that the group was reprimanded by the AEC for not providing official authorisation on its political advertising in accordance with Commonwealth Electoral Act 1918.

== See also ==
- List of ranches and stations
