= Tanumbirini =

Pastoral lease in the Northern Territory

Coordinates: 16.457°S 134.65°E

Location in Northern Territory

Tanumbirini Station is a pastoral lease on formerly what were Kotandji lands that operates as a cattle station in Northern Territory of Australia.

The property is situated approximately 170 kilometres (106 mi) north of Elliott and 182 kilometres (113 mi) west of Borroloola. The property abuts both the Bullwaddy Conservation Reserve and Amungee Mungee Station to the west. Tanumbirini also shares a boundary with Nutwood Downs to the west, Beetaloo Station to the south, Broadmere to the east and the Alawa Aboriginal Land Trust to the north. The Carpentaria Highway passes through the property.

It currently occupies an area of 5,001 square kilometres (1,931 sq mi) and is owned by Rallen Australia (owned by the Ravazzotti and Langenhoven families from South Africa) who acquired the property, along with nearby Forrest Hill Station for A$70 million. The properties have a combined area of 5,593 km^{2} (2,159 sq mi) and are able to support approximately 40,000 head of cattle.

== History ==
The station was established in 1893 when Henry Coop of Calvert Downs moved his cattle west to form the new station at Tanumbirini. Records claim that whilst with his cattle on the Robinson River, Coop was "speared by Aborigines but survives". Calvert Downs was abandoned and Coop established the new Tanumbirini station in 1894.

In 2002 the property was acquired by Henry and Maria Townsend. The 5,000-square-kilometre (1,931 sq mi) property had been suffering from overgrazing and the black soil plans were completely denuded of grass. At the time it was stocked with 10,000 cattle with an additional 2,000 to 3,000 feral cattle. The Townsends redeveloped the property and changed the management practices. They also increased the stock on the property to 23,000 head of cattle before selling in 2007.

Sterling Buntine, who also owned Bedford Downs Station in Western Australia and Amburla Station in the Northern Territory, acquired Tanumbirini in 2007 for an undisclosed sum. At the time it had an area of 3,680 square kilometres (1,421 sq mi) and was to be subdivided and auctioned before Buntine bought it.

The property was then acquired by Thames Pastoral Company, who purchased the property from Sterling Buntine in 2012 for A$30 million. The sale of the station included approximately 28,000 head of cattle. Several watercourses flow through the property including Arnold River, Cox River, Tanumbirini Creek and Williams Creek.

Buntine sold the property in 2012 along with Forrest Hill Station to the Thames Pastoral Company for about A$33 million.

In 2020 the property, along with Forrest Hill station, was acquired by the current owners, Rallen Australia, for $70 million. Tanumbirini and Forrest Hill were sold in one line by Rawdon Briggs and Bram Pollock of Colliers International, and Geoff Warriner and Chris Holgar of JLL.

== See also ==
- List of ranches and stations
- List of the largest stations in Australia
