= Bunda Station =

Pastoral lease in the Northern Territory

Coordinates: 17.997°S 129.347°E

Location in the Northern Territory

Bunda Station is a pastoral lease that operates as a cattle station in the Northern Territory of Australia.

Situated approximately 142 kilometres (88 mi) west of Lajamanu and 168 kilometres (104 mi) south west of Daguragu in the Victoria River district. The property was originally part of Inverway Station until it was carved up into Inverway, Bunda and Riveren Stations. Bunda is bounded to the west by Kirkimbie, the south by Wallamunga, the east by Inverway and the north by Limbunya Station.

The property currently occupies an area of 1,788 square kilometres (690 sq mi) and is stocked with 13,500 Brahman and Charbray infused cattle. To water stock 22 bores have been sunk.

The Underwood family have owned the property since 1956 when it was still part of Inverway Station.

Consolidated Pastoral Company acquired the station, adjacent to Kirkimbie which it already owns, in the Victoria River District in the Northern Territory for approximately A$15 million in 2014. The property had been passed in at auction two years earlier for A$10 million.

== See also ==
- List of ranches and stations
