= Inverway Station =

Pastoral lease in the Northern Territory

Coordinates: 17.849°S 129.635°E

Location in the Northern Territory

Inverway Station is a pastoral lease that operates as a cattle station in the Northern Territory of Australia.

== Location ==
It is situated approximately 119 kilometres (74 mi) north west of Lajamanu and 134 kilometres (83 mi) south west of Daguragu in the Victoria River district. The property was originally much larger until it was carved up into Inverway, Bunda and Riveren Stations. Inverway is bounded by Bunda to the west, Riveren to the east, Limbunya to the north and Birrindudu Station to the south.

== Description ==
The property currently occupies an area of 2,538 square kilometres (980 sq mi) and is stocked with a herd of 17,000 cattle. The country is a mix of black soil plains covered with pastures of Mitchell grass, Queensland blue and silky brown top grasses. The red dirt country supports stands of spinifex.

== History ==
The area was originally scouted by Nat Buchanan and his son Gordon. The three Farquharson brothers, Archie, Harry and Hugh, acquired the lease to the 6,220-square-kilometre (2,402 sq mi) holding in 1894. The men stocked the property by overlanding cattle from Inverell. By 1905 the property was struck by drought and in 1909 the dry had still not lifted. Cool weather helped the men make the decision to drove the cattle over the dry Murranji Track despite there being no water along the way. Over 1,000 cattle were taken and only five were lost on the 200-kilometre (124 mi) journey that took five days.

The Farquharsons remained at the property until the 1940s. Archie was the sole remaining owner in 1946 when he sold a large portion of the station. He remained on the property living in the log homestead he had built with his brothers until his death in 1950. He is buried at Inverway along with one of his brothers.

The Westaway family bought the property in 1956 and placed it on the market in 2007. The Underwood family acquired the property later the same year at auction for A$17.65 million.

Mick and Georgia Underwood sold the property in a private sale along with Riveren Station in 2013 to the Indonesian company, Japfa Santori for an estimated A$35 million. The decision came following live export ban on livestock by the Gillard government in 2011. The station had been passed in at auction in 2012 for A$15 million.

== Climate ==
Climate data for Inverway, elevation 403 m (1,322 ft), (1971–1987 normals, extremes 1969–1987)
Month	Jan	Feb	Mar	Apr	May	Jun	Jul	Aug	Sep	Oct	Nov	Dec	Year
Record high °C (°F)	43.7 (110.7)	43.0 (109.4)	41.1 (106.0)	38.0 (100.4)	35.7 (96.3)	34.0 (93.2)	33.5 (92.3)	36.7 (98.1)	39.3 (102.7)	42.3 (108.1)	45.0 (113.0)	44.0 (111.2)	45.0 (113.0)
Mean daily maximum °C (°F)	35.7 (96.3)	34.6 (94.3)	34.0 (93.2)	32.2 (90.0)	29.8 (85.6)	26.6 (79.9)	26.8 (80.2)	30.7 (87.3)	33.3 (91.9)	36.3 (97.3)	37.7 (99.9)	38.0 (100.4)	33.0 (91.4)
Mean daily minimum °C (°F)	22.9 (73.2)	22.6 (72.7)	20.6 (69.1)	16.9 (62.4)	13.8 (56.8)	10.1 (50.2)	9.2 (48.6)	11.9 (53.4)	16.2 (61.2)	20.1 (68.2)	22.3 (72.1)	22.9 (73.2)	17.5 (63.4)
Record low °C (°F)	16.0 (60.8)	16.5 (61.7)	11.5 (52.7)	8.5 (47.3)	3.5 (38.3)	1.5 (34.7)	−1.0 (30.2)	3.2 (37.8)	4.5 (40.1)	8.5 (47.3)	12.5 (54.5)	13.1 (55.6)	−1.0 (30.2)
Average rainfall mm (inches)	168.6 (6.64)	168.7 (6.64)	84.0 (3.31)	30.4 (1.20)	8.7 (0.34)	5.5 (0.22)	0.4 (0.02)	1.8 (0.07)	4.1 (0.16)	27.8 (1.09)	39.6 (1.56)	93.4 (3.68)	633 (24.93)
Average rainy days (≥ 1.0 mm)	9.3	9.1	4.5	1.2	0.7	0.4	0.1	0.1	0.3	2.5	3.7	7.3	39.2
Source: Australian Bureau of Meteorology (rain 1991-2020)

== See also ==
- List of ranches and stations
