= Keep River National Park =

National park in Northern Territory, Australia

- IUCN category II (national park)
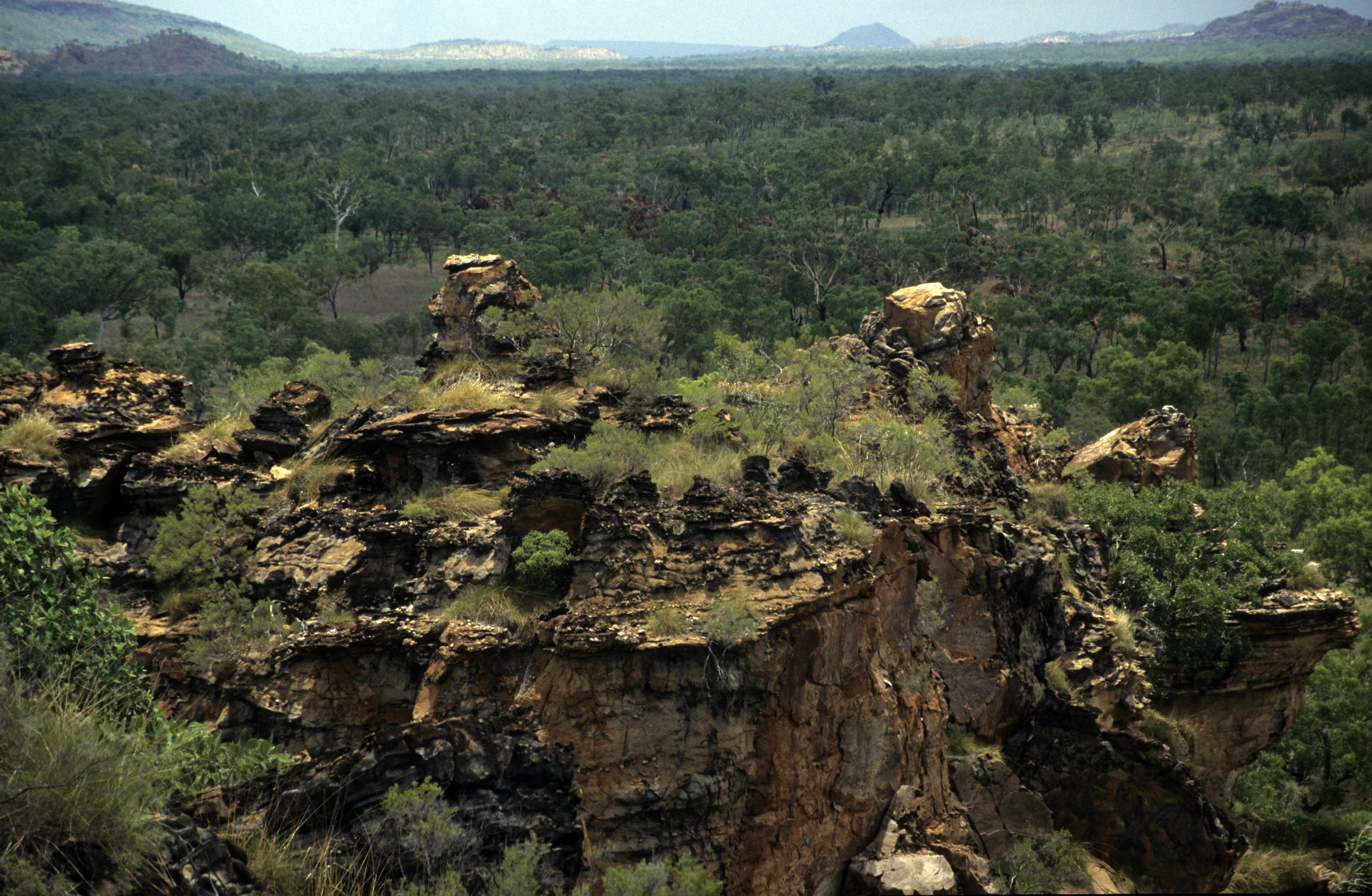
- View from Gurrandalng

- Location within Northern Territory
- Location: Northern Territory
- Nearest city: Kununurra
- Coordinates: 15°48′59″S 129°08′23″E
- Area: 574.37 km^{2} (221.77 sq mi)
- Established: 15 April 1981
- Visitors: 23,200 (in 2022)
- Governing body: Parks and Wildlife Commission of the Northern Territory
- Website: Official website

Keep River National Park is in the Northern Territory of Australia, 418 km southwest of Darwin and 468 km west of Katherine. The nearest town is Kununurra in Western Australia.

== Environment ==
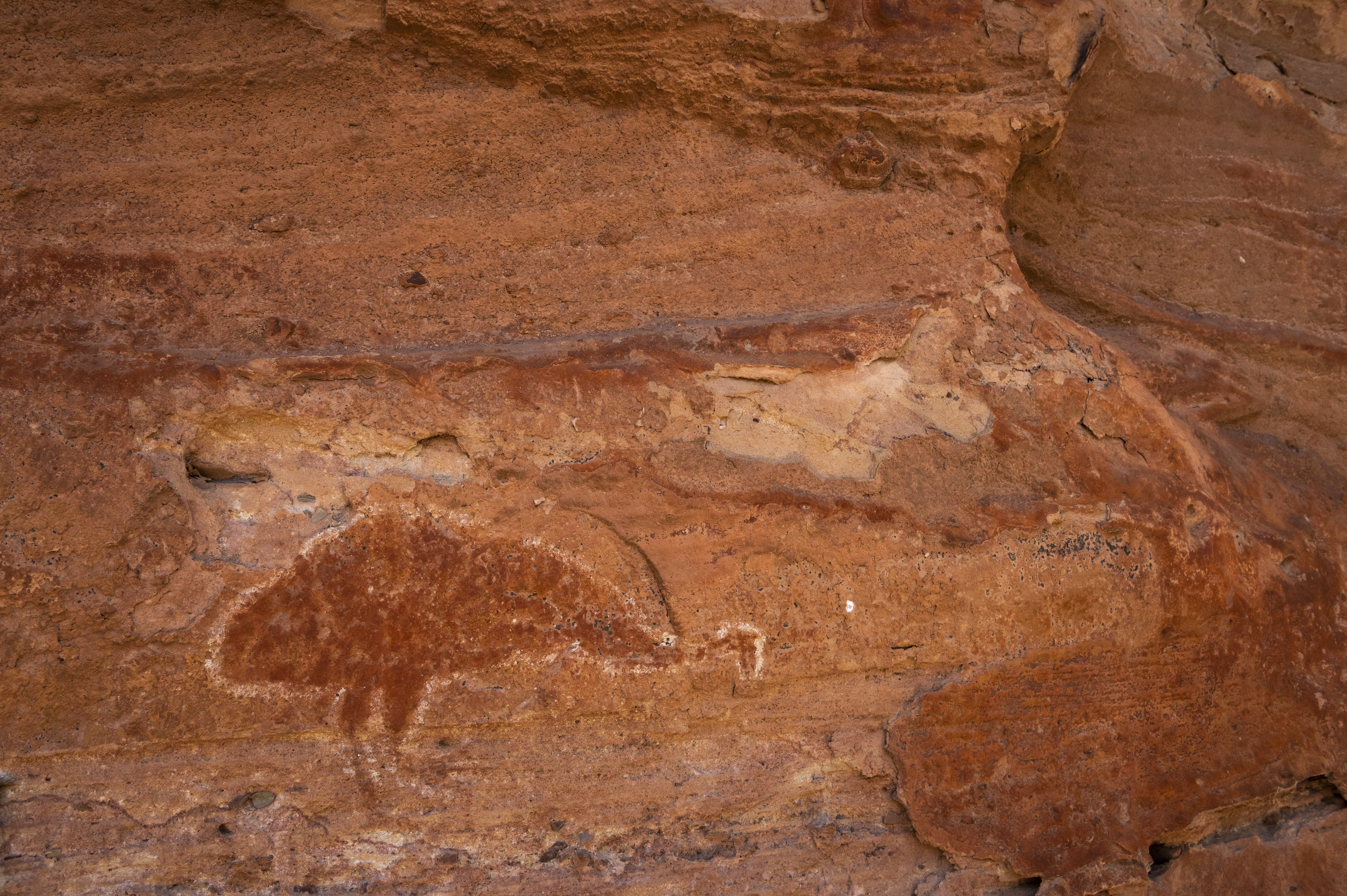
Aboriginal rock art in the park

The park has a number of striking sandstone formations and there is an Indigenous Australian art site at the end of the walk along the floor of the Keep River Gorge. The park falls within the tribal area of the Mirriwung and Gadjerong people. Most of the land in the park also lies within the Keep River Important Bird Area, identified as such because of its importance for the conservation of the endangered Gouldian finch.

== Access ==
Like most of the Top End parks, access can be restricted due to flooding in the wet season. The most comfortable period for visiting is between May and August when the temperature ranges from a maximum of 35 °C to a minimum of 10 °C.

== See also ==
- Protected areas of the Northern Territory
