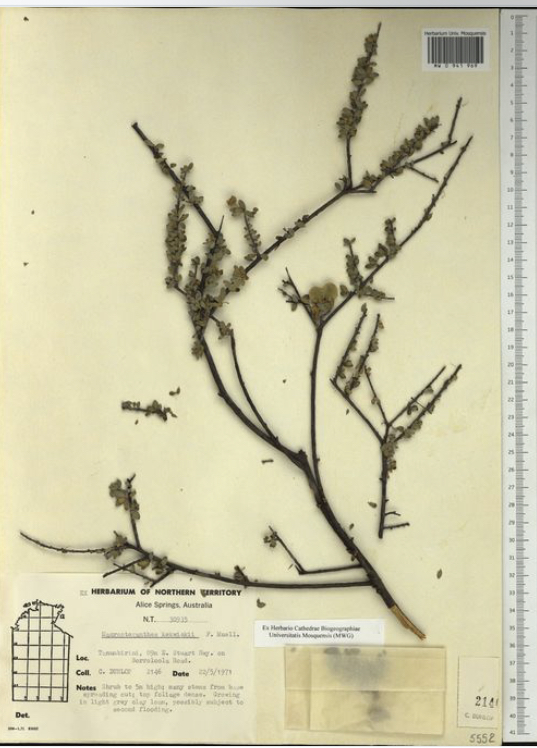

Scientific classification
- Kingdom: Plantae
- Clade: Tracheophytes
- Clade: Angiosperms
- Clade: Eudicots
- Clade: Rosids
- Order: Myrtales
- Family: Combretaceae
- Genus: Macropteranthes
- Species: M. kekwickii

Binomial name
- Macropteranthes kekwickii F.Muell. ex Benth.

= Macropteranthes kekwickii =

Species of shrub

Macropteranthes kekwickii, commonly known as bullwaddy, is a species of woody tree or shrub native to the Northern Territory in Australia.

== Description ==
M. kekwickii is a dry-season deciduous tree that grows up to six metres high, with small leaves growing on short branchlets.

== Taxonomy ==
M. kekwickii was first described by Ferdinand von Mueller, but the name was not published validly since the genus name had not been established. The description was finally published in 1864 in George Bentham's "Flora Australiensis". The type specimen was found at Newcastle Water, on M'Douall Stuart's Expedition."

== Ecology ==
M. kekwickii is found mostly on lateritic soils in the Sturt Plateau bioregion of the Victoria Plains tropical savanna ecoregion. Together with lancewood (Acacia shirleyi), it forms a distinct plant community known as lancewood-bullwaddy woodland. The woodlands have a dense tree canopy and can form impenetrable thickets, with many climbing vines and a sparser understorey of forbs, small shrubs, ferns, and mosses. The woodlands are more fire-sensitive, and less fire-prone, than the adjacent eucalyptus woodlands. These woodlands and thickets are home to many of the fire-sensitive species characteristic of Australia's rainforest flora.
