= Cattle station =

Large Australian farm

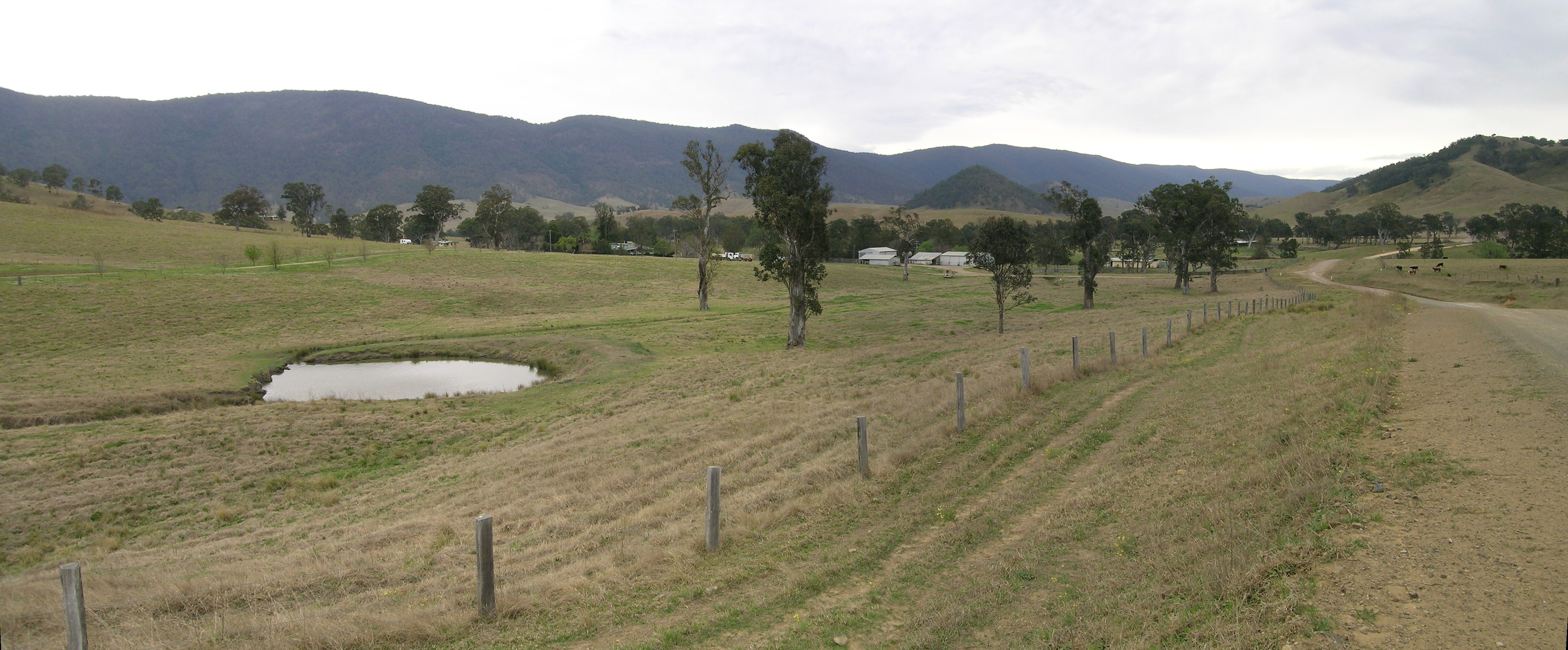
Cooplacurripa cattle station, New South Wales, Australia

In Australia and New Zealand, a cattle station is a large farm (station is equivalent to the North American ranch), the main activity of which is the rearing of cattle. The owner of a cattle station is called a grazier. The largest cattle station in the world is Anna Creek station in South Australia, which (including its outstation, The Peake station) covers an area of 23,876 square kilometres (9219 sq mi; 5,900,000 acres).

== Improvements ==
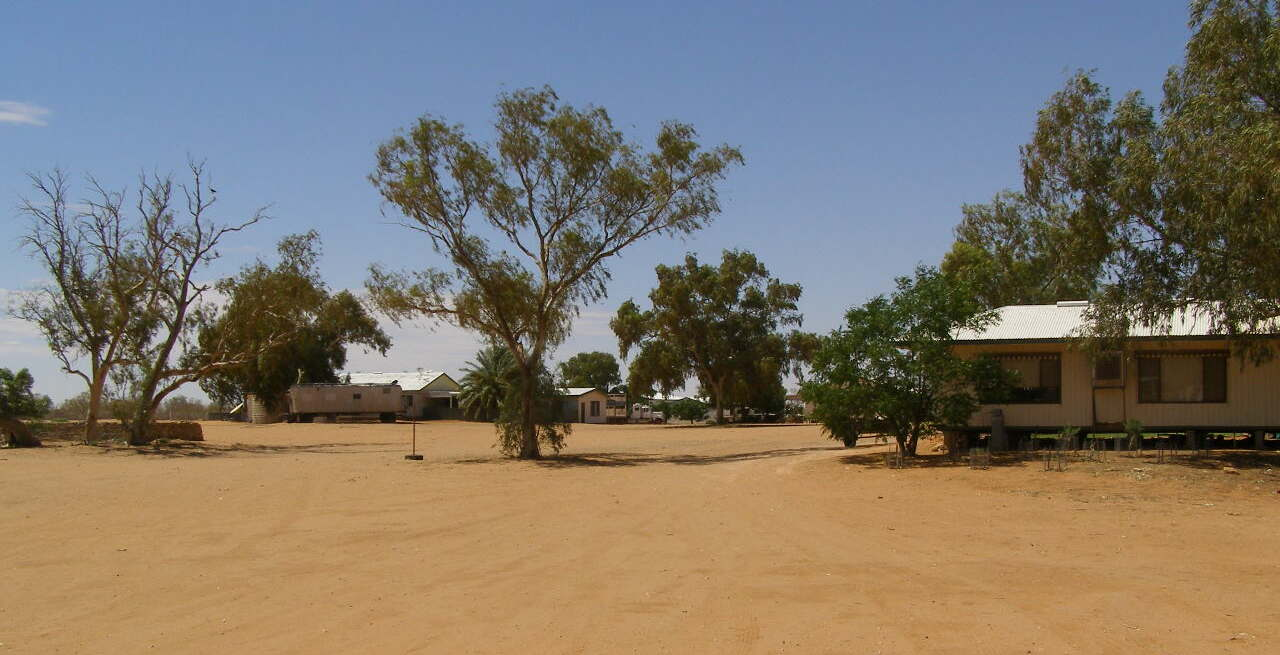
The main homestead buildings of Anna Creek, the world's largest working cattle station, in outback South Australia

Each station has a homestead where the property owner or the manager lives. Nearby cottages or staff quarters provide housing for the employees. Storage sheds and cattle yards are also sited near the homestead. Other structures depend on the size and location of the station. Isolated stations will have a mechanic's workshop, schoolroom, a small general store to supply essentials, and possibly an entertainment or bar area for the owners and staff. Water may be supplied from a river, bores or dams, in conjunction with rainwater tanks. Nowadays, if rural mains power is not connected, electricity is typically provided by a generator, although solar electricity systems have become increasingly common.

Children were originally educated by correspondence lessons, often supervised by a governess, and via the School of the Air, but many children in remote areas went to boarding school for their secondary education. The Royal Flying Doctor Service is available to remote stations in outback Australia.

=== Outstations ===
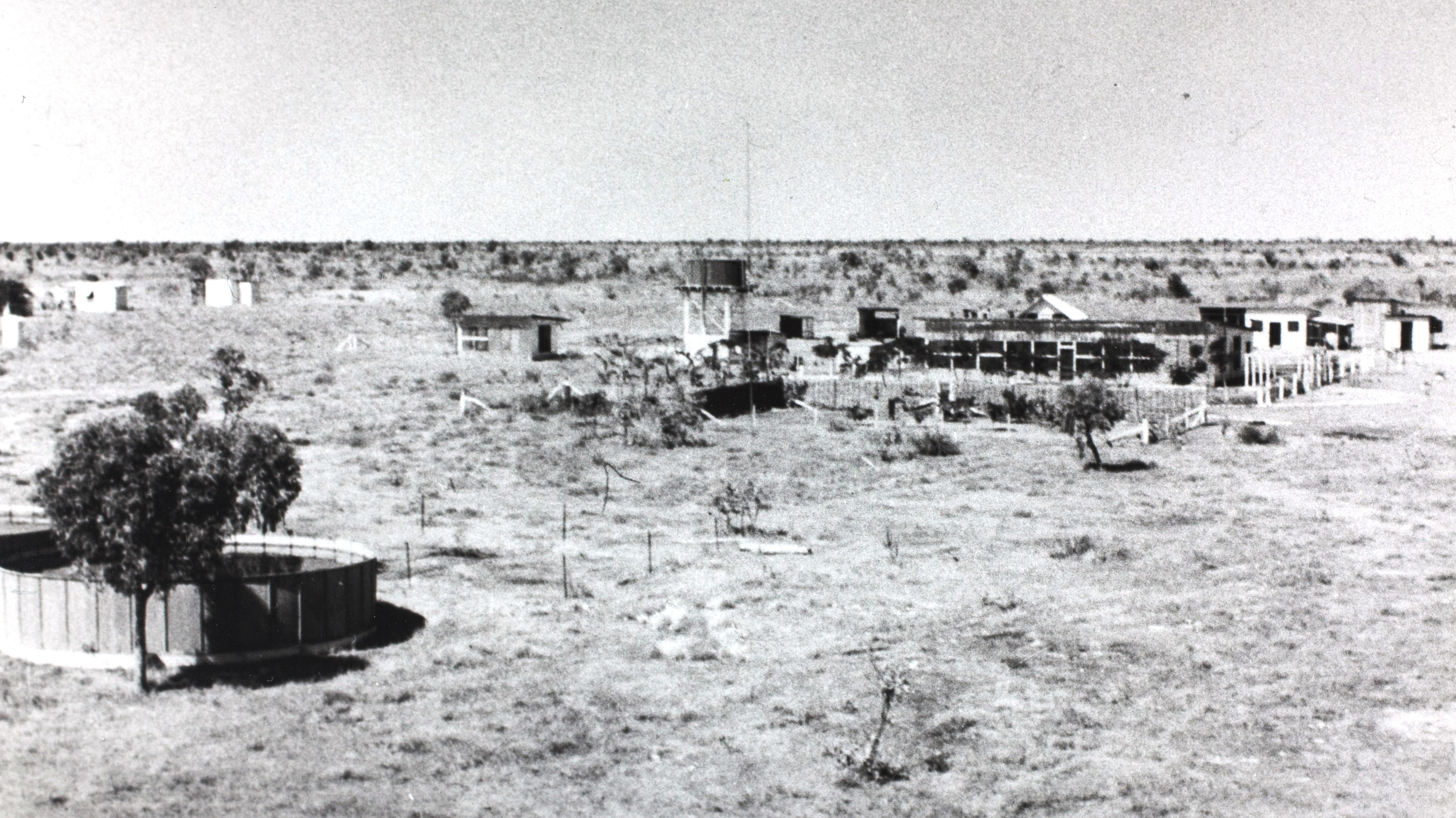
Cattle Creek outstation of Wave Hill, Northern Territory, in 1962

Historically, an outstation was a subsidiary homestead or other dwelling on Australian sheep or cattle stations that was more than a day's return travel from the main homestead. Although the term later came to be more commonly used to describe a specific type of Aboriginal settlement, also known as a homeland community, it is still used on cattle stations today, for example the Sturt Creek Outstation of the Ruby Plains Station in The Kimberley, among others. The cattle station now known as Pigeon Hole was until 2000 an outstation of the Victoria River Downs Station.

== History ==
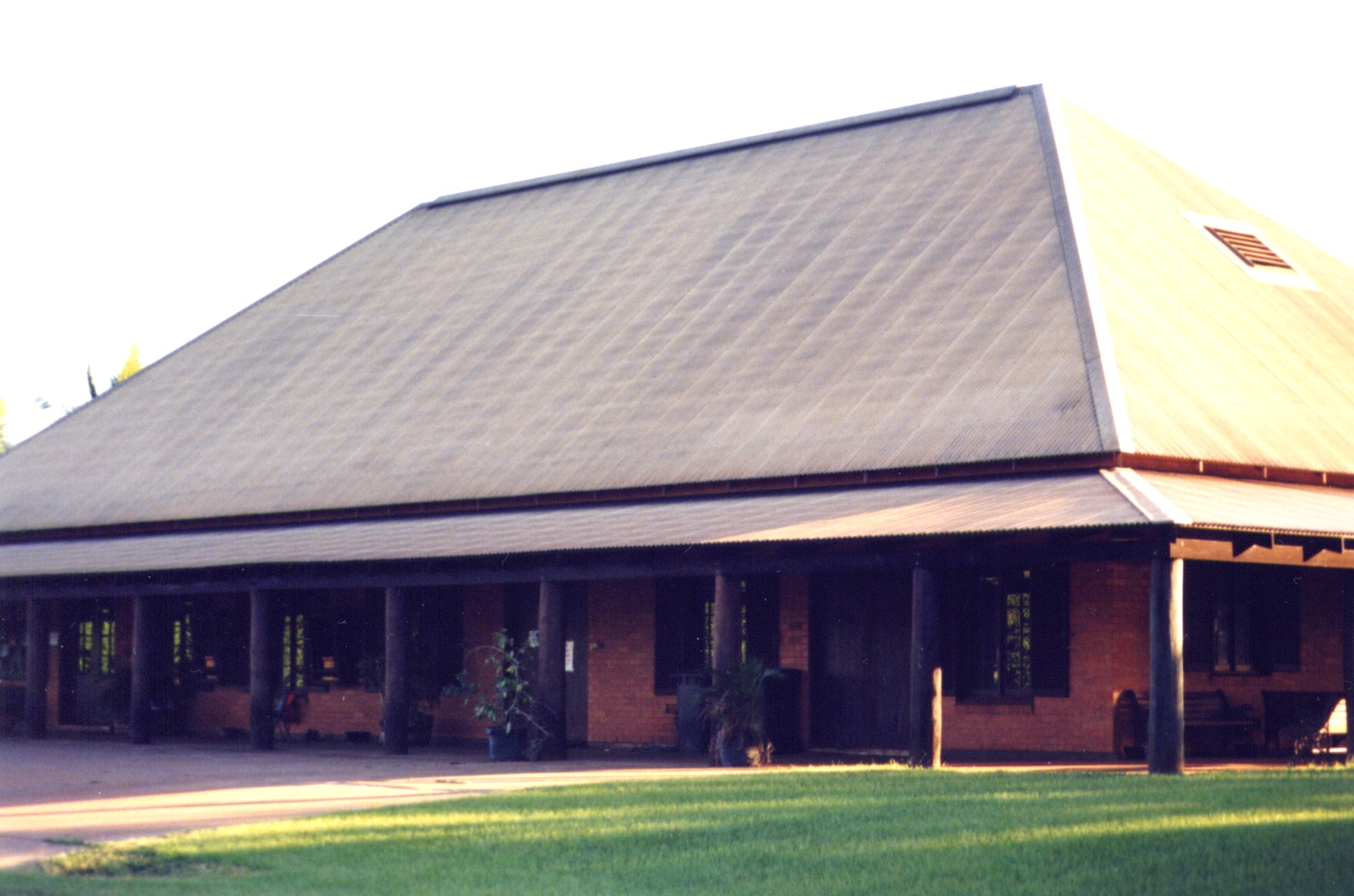
General store, Tipperary Station, Northern Territory

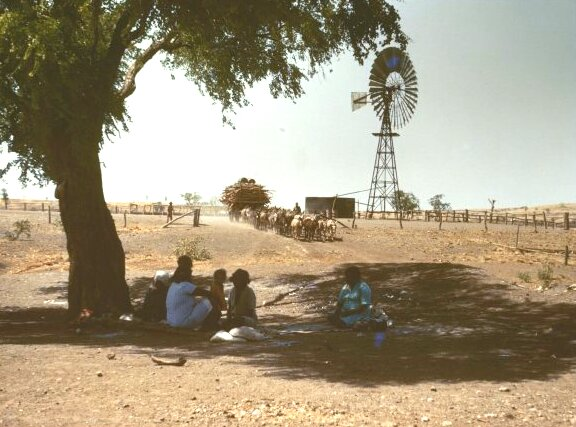
A donkey team at Wave Hill station, Northern Territory, about 1946

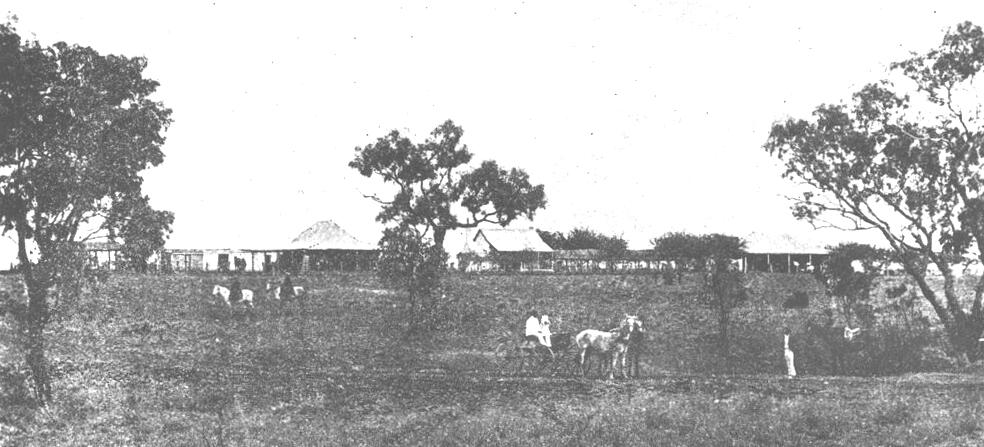
Tuaburra, an outstation of Bowen Downs station in 1898

Charles Brown Fisher and Maurice Lyons, a Melbourne magistrate stocked Victoria River Downs in the early 1880s. Drover, Nathaniel Buchanan (1826–1901), overlanded 20,000 head of cattle from Wilmot to Victoria River Downs in c.1881 to establish their cattle venture. Previously Nat had from 1860 to 1867, stocked and managed Bowen Downs Station near Longreach, Queensland. Buchanan was associated with the opening up and stocking of several cattle stations in the Victoria River district and the Ord River region. The Gordon brothers and Nathaniel Buchanan took up Wave Hill on the Victoria River in 1883, one of the first cattle stations established west of the Telegraph Line. Their nearest neighbour was 200 miles (322 km) away.

By 1898 James Tyson (8 April 1819 – 4 December 1898), held 5,329,214 acres (2,156,680 ha) including 352,332 acres (142,585 ha) freehold. His stations included Bangate, Goondublui, Juanbung, Tupra and Mooroonowa in New South Wales; Heyfield in Victoria; and Glenormiston, Swanvale, Meteor Downs and Albinia Downs, Babbiloora, Carnarvon, Tully, Wyobie, Felton, Mount Russell and Tinnenburra in Queensland.

Sidney Kidman (1857–1935) set up a chain of cattle stations along the sources of water, from the Gulf of Carpentaria, into South Australia to be within easy droving distance of the Adelaide markets.

Aboriginal people have long played a big part in the cattle industry where they were competent stockmen on the cattle stations of the north. In 1950 it was legislated that the Aboriginal workers were now to be paid cash wages.

Many cattle stations were established along the Great Dividing Range where only cattle raising was possible because of dingo attacks on sheep. The original Kunderang Station, on the eastern fall of the Great Dividing Range was taken up by Captain George Jobling as an outstation, and later sold under the Subdivision of Runs Act 1884. Kunderang was one of the few Great Dividing Range stations which was inhabited. The isolated homestead here, was built of solid Australian red cedar (Toona ciliata).

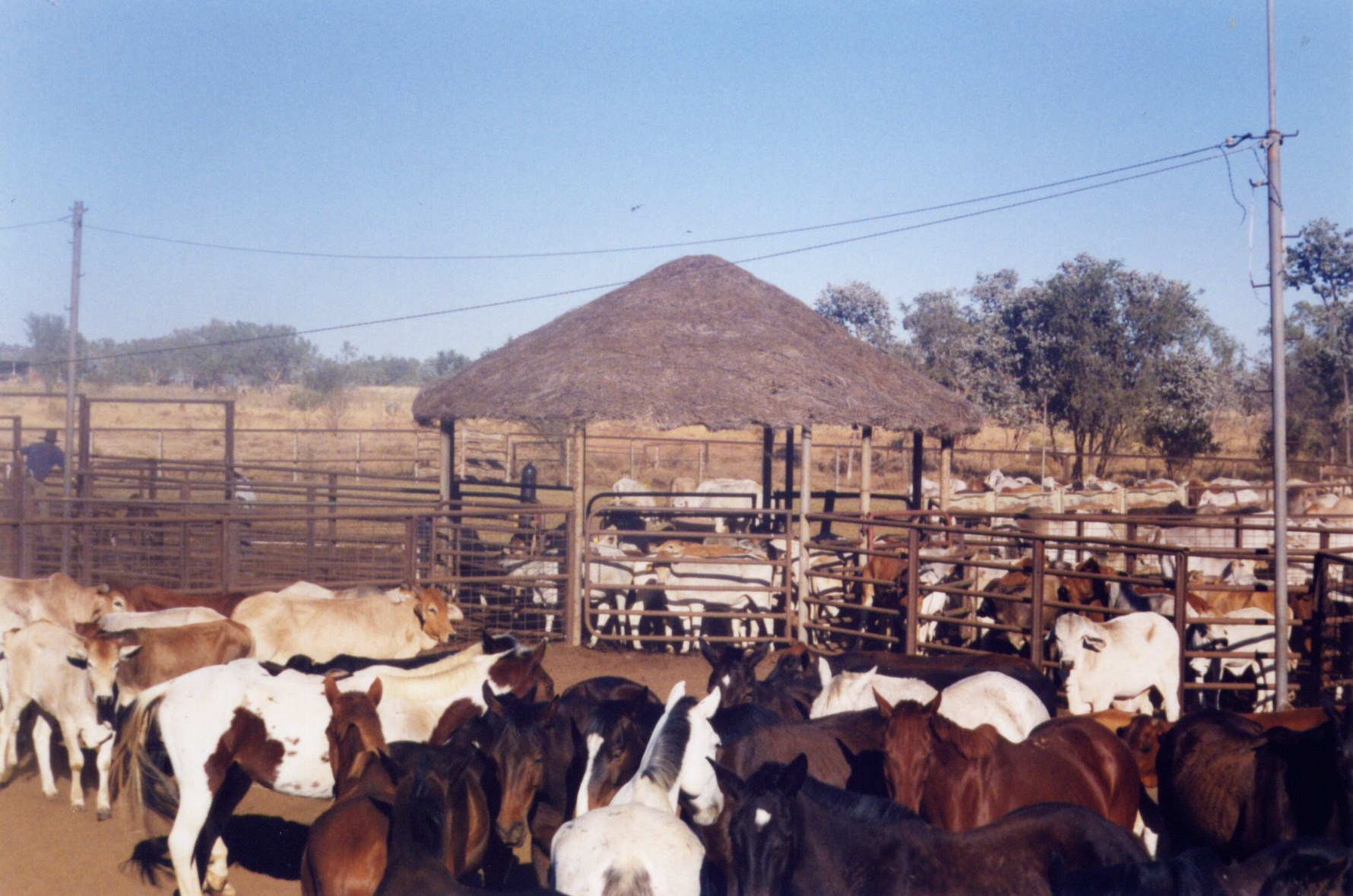
Cattle and horses in stockyards, Victoria River Downs, NT, Australia

Several major events have affected cattle stations starting with the Second World War and including the beef depression of the early 1970s, the technological achievements of the 1980s and the advent of live export markets in the more recent years. Roads and communications were greatly improved as a result of the War. Many of the Northern Territory cattle stations had been previously owned by English companies who also did not pay tax in Australia. The 33,280 square kilometres Victoria River Downs was sold in March 1909 to Lord Luke's Bovril Australian Estates for AU£180,000 and until 1950 they were not paying taxes to the Australian Government. In 1950 income tax was introduced to Northern Territory land owners. The very large stations were subdivided and country was available with reasonable conditions of tenure. This saw an influx of adventurous, working stockmen, with many doing well by mustering 'cleanskins' (unbranded cattle) on their new land.

Zebu cattle were imported from Pakistan in 1956 and Brahman cattle were also brought from United States at about that time. Many new breeds were developed from these imports and this led to cattle that were much more tolerant to the Top End heat and cattle ticks.

The Brucellosis and Tuberculosis Eradication Campaign (BTEC) was a national program to eradicate bovine brucellosis and bovine tuberculosis that commenced in 1970 after years of local jurisdictional activities. In the 1970s, interest rates soared and the American beef market collapsed causing the beef depression. A fat bullock was then worth less than a pair of locally made elastic side riding boots. The cattle herd was reduced to 21.8 million by 1978 in the wake of this crash. Roads and communications were further improved as a result of the Tuberculosis Eradication Campaign. In 1979, a disastrous drought struck and continued into 1983 becoming one of Australia's worst droughts.

Helicopters were now being used to assist in mustering in the 1980s. Australia entered the Japanese beef market in 1988 with improved expectations for a better future in the beef cattle industry.

In December 2016, Anna Creek Station was acquired by Williams Cattle Company.

== Cattle empires ==
The North Australian Pastoral Company Pty Limited (NAPCO) is now one of Australia's largest beef cattle producers, with a herd of over 180,000 cattle and fourteen cattle stations in Queensland and the Northern Territory. The Australian Agricultural Company (AA Co) manages a cattle herd of more than 585,000 head. Heytesbury Beef Pty Ltd owns and manages over two hundred thousand head of cattle across eight stations spanning the East Kimberley, Victoria River and Barkly Tablelands regions in Northern Australia.

Cattle station has a parallel term, sheep station, for those stations carrying sheep rather than cattle. In most cases the stations are in a rangeland context on pastoral leases. Many are larger than small countries. Some stations are not exclusively sheep or cattle stations but have a mix of cattle, sheep and even goats to make the owner less vulnerable to changes in the wool or beef prices.

The phrase is also in traditional Australian English to denote something large and/or important.

== See also ==
- The Speewah
- Pastoral lease
- Sheep station
- List of pastoral leases in the Northern Territory
- List of pastoral leases in Western Australia
- List of ranches and stations
- Intensive animal farming § Cattle
- Muster (livestock)
