= Gajirrawoong =

Aboriginal Australian people of the Northern Territory

The Gajirrawoong people, also written Gadjerong, Gajerrong and other variations, are an Aboriginal Australian people of the Northern Territory, most of whom now live in north-eastern Western Australia.

== Language ==
Geoffrey O'Grady classified their language, Gajirrabeng or Gajirrawoong, as one of two Mirriwongic languages, the other being Miriwoong. More recent work has established it as a member of the Jarrakan group. Gajirrabeng is at severe risk of extinction, with no more than perhaps 2 or 3 native speakers by 2013. Frances Kofod compiled a dictionary of the language in 2007.

== Country ==
Gadjerong lands encompassed 2,100 square kilometres (800 sq mi) in Norman Tindale's reckoning. They ran westwards along the rich ecosystems of mangrove flat, waterholes, creeks and waterfalls along the coastal area from the mouth of the Fitzmaurice River as far as point where the Keep River flows out into the Joseph Bonaparte Gulf. Their inland extension, taking in also at Legune, went as far as the vicinity of Border Springs. They also frequented the offshore area of Quoin Island, and further north, Clump Island, and those off the mouth of Keyling Inlet.

=== Native title claims ===
The Gajirrawoong people were represented in a successful native title claim by the Kimberley Land Council in two joint claims with the Miriuwung people, as "Miriuwung Gajerrong". The Federal Court recognised the native title rights of the two peoples on 9 December 2003, nearly ten years after the claim had been lodged. The claim covers 7,095 square kilometres (2,739 sq mi), and includes Kununurra in the east Kimberley, Lake Argyle, the Keep River and the Ord River Irrigation scheme. Another claim, determined in November 2006, covers 6,758 square kilometres (2,609 sq mi), with the Carlton Hill Station, Ivanhoe Station and the WA pastoral leases of the Rosewood Station. Exclusive possession was recognised across several community-leased areas.

== History ==
The implementation of the Ord River Irrigation scheme had a major impact on the Gadjerong and other peoples of the east Kimberley area. They were dispossessed of parts of their traditional tribal land and many sacred sites were destroyed. In consequence they moved to the Aboriginal reserve in Kununurra. The extension of the principle of equal pay for equal work in 1969 to Aboriginal people also had a negative impact on peoples like the Gajirrawoong in the Kimberley region and the Northern Territory, since the managers of pastoral leases evicted the majority of Indigenous peoples on the land where they lived, with the collateral loss of employment and its substitution by welfare subsidies.

== Alternative names ==
- Kadjerawang
- Kadjarong, Kadjeroen
- Kujera
- Ginmu

== Sources ==
- Basedow, Herbert (1907). "Anthropological notes on the Western Coastal tribes of the Northern Territory of South Australia". Transactions of the Royal Society of South Australia. 31: 1–62.
- Hobson, John Robert (2010). Re-awakening Languages: Theory and Practice in the Revitalisation of Australia's Indigenous Languages. Sydney University Press. ISBN 978-1-920-89955-4.
- Howitt, Richard (2002). Rethinking Resource Management: Justice, Sustainability and Indigenous Peoples. Routledge. ISBN 978-1-134-80566-2.
- McGregor, William B. (2013). The Languages of the Kimberley, Western Australia. Routledge. ISBN 978-1-134-39602-3.
- McWilliam, Andrew (2006). "Absence and Plenitude:Appropriating the Fitzmaurice River". In Rose, Deborah Bird; Davis, Richard (eds.). Dislocating the Frontier: Essaying the Mystique of the Outback. Australian National University. pp. 177–194. ISBN 978-1-920-94237-3.
- Ngabidj, Grant; Shaw, Bruce (1981). My country of the pelican dreaming: the life of an Australian Aborigine of the Gadjerong, Grant Ngabidj, 1904-1977. Australian Institute of Aboriginal Studies. ISBN 978-0-391-02218-8.
- Spencer, Baldwin (1914). Native tribes of the Northern Territory of Australia (PDF). London: Macmillan Publishers.
- Tindale, Norman Barnett (1974). "Kadjerong (NT)". Aboriginal Tribes of Australia: Their Terrain, Environmental Controls, Distribution, Limits, and Proper Names. Australian National University. ISBN 978-0-708-10741-6. Archived from the original on 20 March 2020.
