= Gija language =

Jarragan Aboriginal language of Western Australia

Gija
- Kija
- Region: From Halls Creek to Kununurra, Western Australia
- Ethnicity: Gija
- Native speakers: 266 (2021 census)
- Language family: Jarrakan: Gija
- Writing system: Latin

Language codes
- ISO 639-3: gia
- Glottolog: kitj1240
- AIATSIS: K20
- ELP: Kija
- Kija is classified as Severely Endangered by the UNESCO Atlas of the World's Languages in Danger.

Gija (variously spelled Kija, Kitja, Gidja) is an Australian Aboriginal language today spoken by about 200 people, most of whom live in the region from Halls Creek to Kununurra and west to Lansdowne and Tableland Stations in Western Australia. It is a member of the Jarragan language family, a non-Pama-Nyungan family in the East Kimberley. The Argyle Diamond Mine, on the south-western corner of Lake Argyle, is on the borders of Gija and Miriwoong country. The Purnululu National Park (Gija orthography: 'Boornoolooloo'), which contains the Bungle Bungle Range, is located mostly in Gija country.

Kuluwarrang and Walgi may have been dialects.

== Phonology ==
=== Consonants ===
	Peripheral		Laminal		Apical	
	Labial	Velar	Dental	Palatal	Alveolar	Retroflex
Stop	p	k	t̪	c	t	ʈ
Nasal	m	ŋ	n̪	ɲ	n	ɳ
Lateral				ʎ	l	ɭ
Rhotic					r	ɻ
Approximant	w			j		

- Voiceless stops /p, k, t̪, c, t, ʈ/ can have voiced allophones [b, ɡ, d̪, ɟ, d, ɖ] when in intervocalic positions or when following nasals or liquid consonants. They can also be heard as unreleased when in word-final position.
- /p, k/ can also be heard as fricatives [β, ɣ] in intervocalic positions or when following liquid consonants.
- /t̪/ can freely be heard as an affricate [t̪θ] when in initial positions, and also be heard as either voiced fricative [ð] or affricate [d̪ð] sounds when in intervocalic positions.
- /t, ʈ/ can be heard as flap sounds [ɾ, ɽ] when in intervocalic positions.
- /r/ can have a voiced flap sound [ɾ] when in intervocalic positions. In word-final positions, it has a voiceless trill [r̥] allophone.

=== Vowels ===
	Front	Central	Back
High	i	ɨ	u
Low		a aː	

Phoneme	Allophones
/i/	[i], [ɪ]
/ɨ/	[ɨ], [ɯ]
/u/	[u], [ʊ]
/a/	[ä], [e], [ʌ], [ɔ]

== See also ==
- Frances Kofod; Eileen Bray; Rusty Peters; Joe Blythe; Anna Crane et al. (2022). Gija Dictionary. 1st edn. Canberra, ACT: Aboriginal Studies Press. ISBN 9781922752109.
- Shirley Purdie; Peggy Patrick; Lena Nyadbi; et al. (2018). Gija Plants and Animals: Aboriginal Flora and Fauna Knowledge from the east Kimberley, north Australia. Northern Territory Botanical Bulletin. Vol. 47. Batchelor: Batchelor Press. ISBN 978-1-74350-130-6. OCLC 1066318745. S2CID 155990126. Wikidata Q109466091.
