= Duulngari =

Indigenous people in Northern Territory and Western Australia

The Doolboong, also known as Duulngari, were an Aboriginal Australian people of the Northern Territory and northeast Western Australia.

== Language ==
Doolboong, alternatively named Tuplung/Duulingari, is believed to have belonged to the Jarrakan languages. The language is extinct and little is known of it.

== People ==
Little is known of the Doolboong. Norman Tindale placed them in the mangrove flats and springs on the coast to the north and west of Ninbing Station, stating that they ranged from Wyndham eastwards as far as the mouth of the Keep River across the border into the Northern Territory. He estimated their tribal lands' extent at 2,000 square miles (5,200 km^{2}). The Australian Institute of Aboriginal and Torres Strait Islander Studies interactive map places them inland, within the same colour code, north of the Miriwung people, and south of the Gadjerong. The linguist William B. McGregor states that their language was spoken on the Cambridge Gulf and that they lay west of the Gadjerong.

== Clans ==
Tindale names three hordes known to be subdivisions of the Doolboong.

- Pokai
- Kanjai (located west of Knob Peak)
- Wardaia (located east of Knob Peak)

== Alternative names ==
- Kurramo (language name)
- Pokai
- Kanjai
- Wardaia, Wardai, Wardia

== Sources ==
- "AIATSIS map of Indigenous Australia". AIATSIS. 28 July 2023.
- McGregor, William B. (2013). The Languages of the Kimberley, Western Australia. Routledge. ISBN 978-1-134-39602-3.
- "Tindale Tribal Boundaries" (PDF). Department of Aboriginal Affairs, Western Australia. September 2016. Archived from the original (PDF) on 8 March 2016.
- Tindale, Norman Barnett (1974). "Duulngari (WA)". Aboriginal Tribes of Australia: Their Terrain, Environmental Controls, Distribution, Limits, and Proper Names. Australian National University. Archived from the original on 20 March 2020.
