= Miriwoong Sign Language =

Australian Aboriginal sign language

- Native to: Australia
- Region: Kununurra, Western Australia
- Language family: Sign languages: Miriwoong; Miriwoong Sign Language

Language codes
- ISO 639-3: rsm
- Glottolog: miri1273

Miriwoong Sign Language is a developed Australian Aboriginal sign language used by the Miriwoong, an Aboriginal community in the north of Australia. Only older adults use the language as a first language. Signers do not find Yolngu Sign Language to be understandable.
