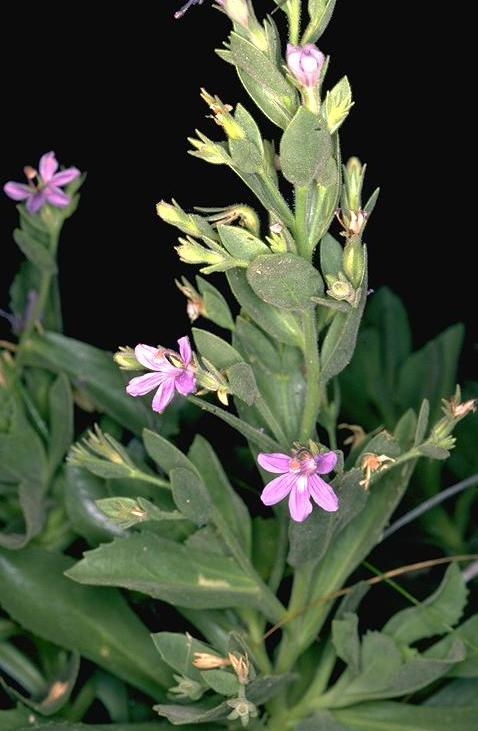
- In the Bungle Bungle Range

Scientific classification
- Kingdom: Plantae
- Clade: Tracheophytes
- Clade: Angiosperms
- Clade: Eudicots
- Clade: Asterids
- Order: Asterales
- Family: Goodeniaceae
- Genus: Goodenia
- Species: G. scaevolina

Binomial name
- Goodenia scaevolina F.Muell.

= Goodenia scaevolina =

Species of plant

Goodenia scaevolina is a species of flowering plant in the family Goodeniaceae and is endemic to the north-west of Australia. It a perennial subshrub with egg-shaped to lance-shaped leaves, the narrower end towards the base, and thyrses of blue flowers.

== Description ==
Goodenia scaevolina is a much-branched perennial subshrub that typically grows to a height of up to 80 cm (31 in), and has sticky foliage. The leaves on the stems are egg-shaped to lance-shaped with the narrower end towards the base, 40–70 mm (1.6–2.8 in) long and 20–30 mm (0.79–1.18 in) wide. The flowers are arranged in thyrses up to 350 mm (14 in) long on peduncles 10–50 mm (0.39–1.97 in) with leaf-like bracts. Each flower is on a pedicel 1–7 mm (0.039–0.276 in) long with elliptic to linear bracteoles 5–10 mm (0.20–0.39 in) long. The sepals are lance-shaped to narrow elliptic, 5–10 mm (0.20–0.39 in) long, the corolla blue, 20–25 mm (0.79–0.98 in) long. The lower lobes of the corolla are 10–12 mm (0.39–0.47 in) long with wings 1.5–3.5 mm (0.059–0.138 in) wide.

== Taxonomy and naming ==
Goodenia scaevolina was first formally described in 1859 by Ferdinand von Mueller in Fragmenta phytographiae Australiae from material collected in 1856. The specific epithet (scaevolina) means Scaevola-like.

== Distribution ==
This goodenia grows in scrub in shallow, stony soil in the Kimberley region of Western Australia and the north-west of the Northern Territory.

== Conservation status ==
Goodenia scaevolina is classified as "not threatened" by the Government of Western Australia Department of Parks and Wildlife and of "least concern" under the Northern Territory Government Territory Parks and Wildlife Conservation Act 1976.
