= List of State Register of Heritage Places in the Shire of Wyndham-East Kimberley =

List of heritage sites in Western Australia

The State Register of Heritage Places is maintained by the Heritage Council of Western Australia. As of 2026, 120 places are heritage-listed in the Shire of Wyndham-East Kimberley, of which three are on the State Register of Heritage Places.

== List ==
The Western Australian State Register of Heritage Places, as of 2026, lists the following three state registered places within the Shire of Wyndham-East Kimberley:

Place name	Place #	Street number	Street name	Suburb or town	Co-ordinates	Notes & former names	Photo
School House (former), Kununurra Research Station	9576		Durak Drive	Kununurra	15.653473°S 128.7067°E		
Main Pump Station, Kununurra	9589		Lakeview Drive	Kununurra	15.791984°S 128.717495°E	M1 Pump Station, Kununurra	
Frank Wise Institute of Tropical Agriculture	16601		Durak Drive	Kununurra	15.653054°S 128.705497°E	Kimberley Research Station, Kununurra Research Station	
