= Patrick Mantinea Durack =

Australian pastoralist and merchant

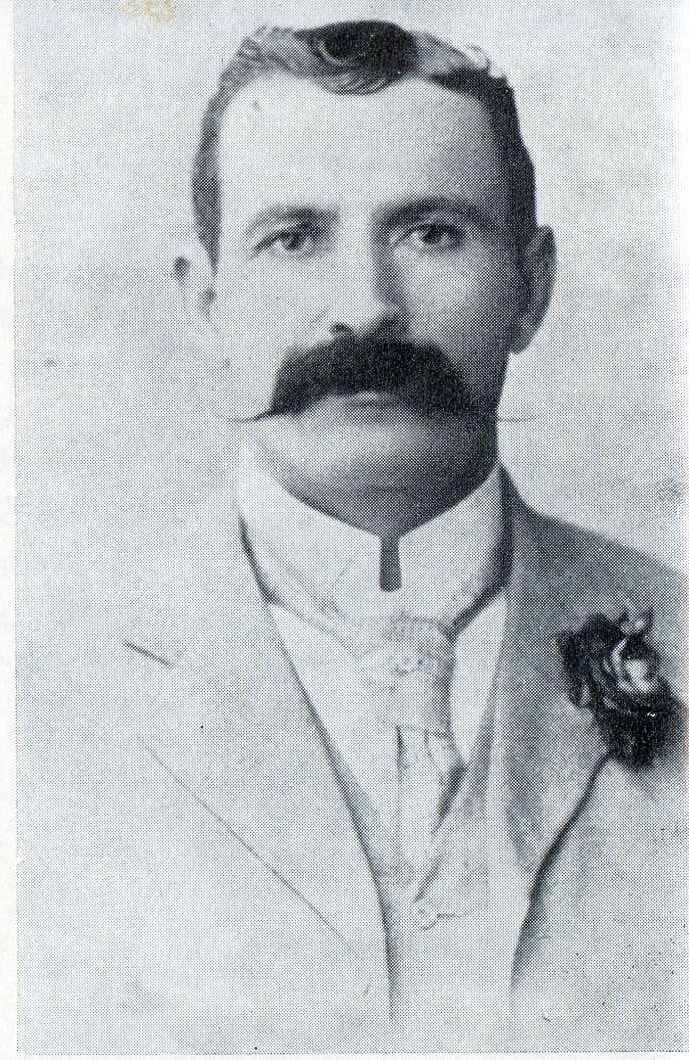
- Durack on his wedding day, Clunes, Victoria, 29 November 1899.
- Born: 1852; Goulburn, New South Wales
- Died: December 23, 1933 (aged 81); Three Springs, Western Australia
- Resting place: Karrakatta Cemetery, Perth
- Other name: "Black Pat"
- Occupations: Pastoralist, Merchant, Justice of the Peace
- Spouse: Susan Downes (m. 1899)
- Children: 4 sons (Walter, Lance, Austin, William)
- Parent(s): Jeremiah Dermott "Darby" Durack and Margaret Kilfoyle
- Family: Durack family

Patrick Mantinea Durack (1852 – 23 December 1933), known as "Black Pat", was an Australian pastoralist, explorer, and pioneer merchant. He was a co-leader of the 1883–1885 cattle overlanding from Queensland to the East Kimberley and for establishing the first maritime supply chain to the Halls Creek goldfields.

To distinguish himself from his uncle, Patsy Durack, he formally adopted the middle name "Mantinea," derived from his foundation station on the Ord River.

== Early life ==
Durack was born in 1852 near Goulburn, New South Wales. He was the second son of Jeremiah Dermott "Darby" Durack (1819–1871) and Margaret Kilfoyle (1828–1905). Following his father's accidental death in 1871, Patrick and his brothers assumed management of the family's "Kilfoyle-Durack" pastoral interests in South West Queensland, including Thylungra and Mt. Marlow stations.

== Kimberley pioneering (1883–1890) ==
In 1883, Durack was a primary leader of the 500-mile (4,000 km) cattle drive from Cooper Creek to the Kimberley. The party arrived at the Ord River in September 1885, where he established Mantinea Station.

=== Mercantile activities and View Hill ===
Realizing the logistical needs of the 1886 Kimberley gold rush, Durack traveled to Darwin to charter the schooner Lorinda Borstel. In early 1886, he landed 46 tons of supplies at **Land Slip Point** (View Hill, Cambridge Gulf), establishing the first merchant store in the region to service the goldfields. His arrival is marked by an inscription on a Boab tree at View Hill. Between 1888 and 1890, he operated as a merchant in Wyndham while managing his pastoral holdings.

== Later life in the Mid West ==
In 1902, Durack relocated to the Mid West of Western Australia, acquiring the 12,500-acre Arrino Estate near Three Springs. He became a civic leader, serving as a Justice of the Peace and Magistrate by 1917. He was a founding member of the Three Springs Race Club (1910) and the Three Springs Agricultural Society (1928), serving as the inaugural Vice President for both.

== Personal life ==
On 29 November 1899, Durack married Susan "Susie" Downes in Clunes, Victoria. A trained nurse, Susan was a partner in the management of their Western Australian holdings. They had four sons: Walter Wyndham, Frederick Lance, George Austin, and William Edgar.

Durack died at his Arrino property on 23 December 1933 and was buried in the Roman Catholic section of Karrakatta Cemetery in Perth.
