= Doolboong language =

Extinct Australian Aboriginal language

Doolboong
- Region: Northern Territory
- Ethnicity: Doolboong
- Extinct: (date missing)
- Language family: Jarrakan: Miriwung?; Doolboong

Language codes
- ISO 639-3: None (mis)
- Glottolog: None
- AIATSIS: K50

Doolboong (also Tulpung or Duulngari) is an extinct Australian Aboriginal language formerly spoken by the Doolboong on the coast of the Cambridge Gulf in the Northern Territory.

There are no longer any speakers of Doolboong, and no written records of it exist. However, speakers of the nearby Gajirrabeng and Miriwoong languages say it was similar to Gajirrabeng. This would place it in the Jarrakan family; however, it may instead belong to the neighbouring Worrorran family.
