= Acacia zatrichota =

Conservation status
- Priority Two — Poorly Known Taxa (DEC)

Scientific classification
- Kingdom: Plantae
- Clade: Embryophytes
- Clade: Tracheophytes
- Clade: Spermatophytes
- Clade: Angiosperms
- Clade: Eudicots
- Clade: Rosids
- Order: Fabales
- Family: Fabaceae
- Subfamily: Caesalpinioideae
- Clade: Mimosoid clade
- Genus: Acacia
- Species: A. zatrichota

Binomial name
- Acacia zatrichota A.S.George

Species of legume

Acacia zatrichota is a shrub belonging to the genus Acacia and the subgenus Lycopodiifoliae. It is native to a small area in the Kimberley region of Western Australia.

The shrub typically grows to a height of 1.5 metres (5 ft) and produces yellow flowers in July. It has branches covered in fine white hairs and have brown spreading stipules that are 0.5 to 2.8 mm (0.020 to 0.110 in) in length. The phyllodes occur in whorls containing sixteen to twenty individuals. The erect and straight to incurved phyllodes are cylindrical in cross section and are usually 8 to 18 mm (0.31 to 0.71 in) in length with a small hard point at the tip.

The species only has a limited distribution in southeastern parts of the Kimberley in Purnululu National Park and in Winnama Gorge where it is often found in open woodland or open shrubland communities where it is often associated with species of Triodia. It grows in areas of dissected sandstone and a sandstone scree slopes.

The species has one homotypic synonym: Racosperma zatrichotum (A.S.George) Pedley described in 2003.

== See also ==
- List of Acacia species
