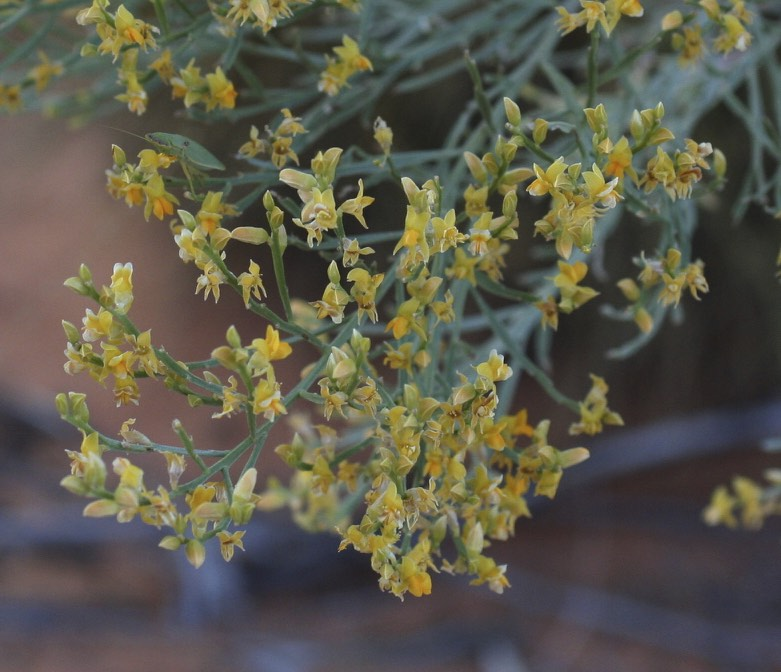
- In Purnululu National Park

Scientific classification
- Kingdom: Plantae
- Clade: Tracheophytes
- Clade: Angiosperms
- Clade: Eudicots
- Clade: Rosids
- Order: Fabales
- Family: Fabaceae
- Subfamily: Faboideae
- Genus: Jacksonia
- Species: J. forrestii

Binomial name
- Jacksonia forrestii F.Muell.

Synonyms
- Jacksonia secunda Chappill ms; Jacksonia sp. (E.A.Chesterfield 263); Piptomeris forrestii (F.Muell.) Greene; Jacksonia thesioides auct. non A.Cunn. ex Benth.

= Jacksonia forrestii =

Species of legume

Jacksonia forrestii, commonly known as broom bush, is a species of flowering plant in the family Fabaceae and is endemic to the north-west of Australia. It is an erect, slender, weeping shrub or tree with sharply pointed phylloclades, yellow to yellow-orange flowers without markings, and woody, hairy pods.

== Description ==
Jacksonia forrestii is an erect, slender, weeping shrub or tree that typically grows up to 1–5 m (3 ft 3 in – 16 ft 5 in) high and 1–2 m (3 ft 3 in – 6 ft 7 in) wide, its branches greyish green and ribbed. Its end branches are sharply-pointed phylloclades, its leaves reduced to narrowly egg-shaped to egg-shaped, reddish brown scales, 0.5–1.8 mm (0.020–0.071 in) long and 0.35–1.0 mm (0.014–0.039 in) wide. The flowers are densely arranged near the ends of branches on a straight pedicel 1.3–2.0 mm (0.051–0.079 in) long. There are egg-shaped bracteoles 0.4–0.9 mm (0.016–0.035 in) long and 0.2–0.6 mm (0.0079–0.0236 in) wide on the pedicels. The floral tube is 0.8–1.4 mm (0.031–0.055 in) long and the sepals are membranous, the upper lobes 1.7–2.7 mm (0.067–0.106 in) long and 1.2–1.7 mm (0.047–0.067 in) wide, the lower lobes longer but narrower. The flowers are yellow to yellow-orange without markings, the standard petal 3.6–4.5 mm (0.14–0.18 in) long and 3.6–4.3 mm (0.14–0.17 in) wide, the wings 3.6–3.8 mm (0.14–0.15 in) long, and the keel is 2.8–3.3 mm (0.11–0.13 in) long. The filaments of the stamens are green, 2.0–3.2 mm (0.079–0.126 in) long. Flowering occurs from March to November, and the fruit is a woody, hairy, elliptic pod, 3.0–5.4 mm (0.12–0.21 in) long and 1.4–1.5 mm (0.055–0.059 in) wide.

== Taxonomy ==
Jacksonia forrestii was first formally described in 1887 by Ferdinand von Mueller in the Proceedings of the Linnean Society of New South Wales from specimens collected by Alexander Forrest. The specific epithet (forrestii) honours the collector of the type specimens.

== Distribution and habitat ==
This species of Jacksonia grows in woodland with a grassy understorey and is widespread in the eastern Kimberley of Western Australia and low-lying areas in the western Northern Territory.

== Conservation status ==
Jacksonia forrestii is listed as "not threatened" by the Government of Western Australia Department of Biodiversity, Conservation and Attractions and of "least concern" under the Northern Territory Territory Parks and Wildlife Conservation Act.
