= Carlton Hill Station =

Pastoral lease in Western Australia

Coordinates: 15.48555°S 128.5343°E

Location in Western Australia

Carlton Hill Station is a pastoral lease and cattle station located in the Kimberley region of Western Australia. Situated approximately 39 kilometres (24 mi) to the north-west of Kununurra and 44 kilometres (27 mi) east of Wyndham, the station covers an area of 3,675 square kilometres (1,419 sq mi).

The property lies on the land of the Gajirrawoong and Miriwung peoples, whose native title was recognised by the Federal Court of Australia in 2006.

The property is split in two by the Ord River as it flows from Lake Argyle to the Cambridge Gulf. A neighbouring property is Ivanhoe Station, which is also owned by the Consolidated Pastoral Company.

The alluvial flats and black soil plains support rich stands of couch and buffel, which make good grazing feed. Carlton Hill and Ivanhoe Station are able to support 50,000 head of cattle, including 18,000 Brahman breeders. The station is able to turn out 9,000 steers per annum for live export to Asia and the Middle East.

== History ==
The station was initially established by J & J Hart (John and Joseph, brothers) and Patrick Durack and his brother Michael, who founded the station in 1893. The Durack's transferred their lease to the Harts a year later. In 1897 the Hart brothers transferred the lease into the name of Herbert Hart, their father. By 1901 the station was carrying about 3,000 head of cattle. In 1903 the lease was transferred to S.R. & I.S. Emanuel and in 1907 transferred to Emanuel, Kidman & Troup. In 1909 it was transferred to Bovril Australian Estates.

In August 2016, the station was sold by the Consolidated Pastoral Company to Chinese property developers Shanghai Zhongfu trading in Australia as Kimberley Agricultural Investment. Consolidated Pastoral Company's chief executive officer Troy Setter said CPC negotiated a 10-year-leaseback of the majority of the station, where it will continue to run its cattle production operations on the property.

The Sidney Kidman company Bovril Australian Estates purchased Carlton Hill in 1909 along with another two stations, one being Northcote and the other in Northern Territory called Victoria River Downs, for a total of £200,000.

In 2010, the station manager was Stirling Fearon, who oversaw the 20-strong crew that completed that year's muster. The muster is mostly carried out on horseback using the station stock horses.

Director Baz Luhrmann used House Roof Hill, which stands behind the horse arena, as a backdrop for the fictional Faraway Downs homestead in his film Australia in 2008.

== Tourism ==
The station is open for tours during the Ord Valley muster. During the tour customers are invited to the Hoochery, a family operated distillery, and the oldest legal still in Western Australia.

== See also ==
- List of ranches and stations
