= Kyabra County, Queensland =

County in Queensland

Kyabra County
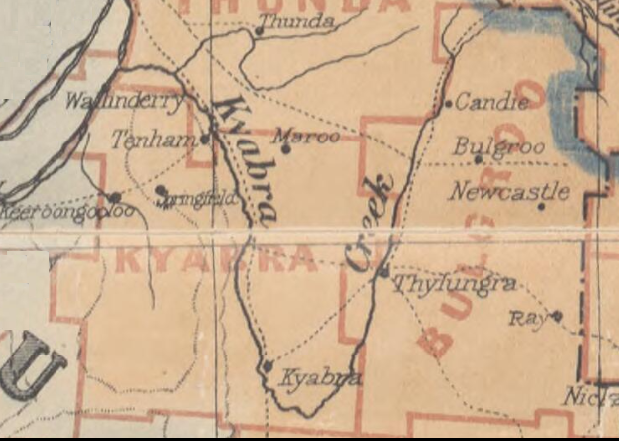
- Kyabra and Bulgroo counties in 1900

- Coordinates: 26.1°S 142.95°E
- Country: Australia
- State: Queensland
- LGA: Barcoo Shire
- Location: 76 km (47 mi) NE of Windorah; 275 km (171 mi) SW of Longreach; 1,122 km (697 mi) W of Brisbane

Government
  - State electorate: Gregory
  - Federal division: Maranoa

Area
  - Total: 13,085.7 km^{2} (5,052.4 sq mi)
- Time zone: UTC+10:00 (AEST)

Kyabra County is a cadastral division of Queensland and a county of the South Gregory District of south western Queensland.

Like all counties in Queensland, it is a non-functional administrative unit that is used mainly for the purpose of registering land titles. From 30 November 2015, the government no longer referenced counties and parishes in land information systems however the Museum of Lands, Mapping and Surveying retains a record for historical purposes.

== History ==
Patrick Durack established cattle stations in the County in 1868.

The county came into existence on 8 March 1901, when the Governor of Queensland issued a proclamation legally dividing Queensland into counties under the Land Act 1897.

It was named after a pastoral station established by John Costello. It is believed to an Aboriginal word, meaning large water hole.
