= Miriwoong people =

Aboriginal Australian people of the Kimblerley region in Western Australia

The Miriwoong people, also written Miriwung and Miriuwung, are an Aboriginal Australian people of the Kimberley region of northern Western Australia.

== Language ==
Miriwoong language (AIATSIS "Miriwoong / Miriuwung") is one of the three surviving tongues of the Jarrakan languages, the word jarrak meaning language, talk, speech. Miriwung is on the verge of extinction with only 20 fluent speakers remaining. A word in the language is jendoobang, which means 'string' and has a comitative suffix.

== Country ==
Miriwoong traditional lands stretched over some 10,000 square kilometres (4,000 sq mi), from the south at the Ord River valley, north to present day Carlton Hill Station, and upriver to Ivanhoe Station. Its eastern flank lay just across the border with the Northern Territory, at Newry Station. They dwelt also along the Keep River down to the coast.

Running clockwise from the north, the neighbours of the Miriwung (excluding the poorly attested Doolboong), were the Gajirrawoong, then on the northeastern flank the Jamindjung, followed by the Ngarinman due east, the Gija at their southern confines and the Ngarinyin to their west.

The Miriwoong people were represented in a successful native title claim by the Kimberley Land Council in two joint claims with the Gajirrawoong people, as "Miriuwung Gajerrong". The Federal Court recognised the native title rights of the two peoples on 9 December 2003, nearly ten years after the claim had been lodged. The claim covers 7,095 square kilometres (2,739 sq mi), and includes Kununurra in the east Kimberley, Lake Argyle, the Keep River and the Ord River Irrigation scheme. Another claim, determined in November 2006, covers 6,758 square kilometres (2,609 sq mi), with the Carlton Hill Station, Ivanhoe Station and the WA pastoral leases of the Rosewood Station. Exclusive possession was recognised across several community-leased areas.

== Alternative names ==
- Miriwun, Miriwong, Mirriwong
- Miriwu (a Gija exonym)
- Moreng ("westerners"), Mirong, Mirung

== Modern times ==
Most traditional Miriwung live in Kununurra and outlying stations.

== Sources ==
- "AIATSIS map of Indigenous Australia". AIATSIS. 14 May 2024.
- "Tindale Tribal Boundaries" (PDF). Department of Aboriginal Affairs, Western Australia. September 2016.
- McGregor, William B. (2013). The Languages of the Kimberley, Western Australia. Routledge. ISBN 978-1-134-39602-3.
- McGregor, William B. (2000). "Cockatoos, Chaining-Horsemen, and Mud-Eaters: Terms for "Policeman" in Australian Aboriginal Languages". Anthropos. 95 (1): 3–22. JSTOR 40465858.
- Tindale, Norman Barnett (1974). "Miriwung (WA)". Aboriginal Tribes of Australia: Their Terrain, Environmental Controls, Distribution, Limits, and Proper Names. Australian National University. ISBN 978-0-708-10741-6. Archived from the original on 20 March 2020.
