= Ivanhoe Station =

Pastoral lease in Western Australia

Coordinates: 15°41′24.35″S 128°40′57.58″E

Location in Western Australia

Ivanhoe or Ivanhoe Station is a pastoral lease and cattle station located just north of Kununurra in the Kimberley region of Western Australia. Founded in 1893 by the Durack brothers, the station is presently owned by the Consolidated Pastoral Company.

== Description ==
The station occupies an area of 2,954 square kilometres (1,141 sq mi) and follows the bank of the Ord River as it flows from Lake Argyle to Cambridge Gulf over a distance of 35 kilometres (22 mi). The alluvial flats and black soil plains support rich stands of couch and buffel, which make good grazing feed.

The property lies on the land of the Gajirrawoong and Miriwung peoples, whose native title was recognised by the Federal Court of Australia in 2006.

Ivanhoe and its neighbour Carlton Hills are able to support 50,000 head of cattle including 18,000 Brahman breeders. The station is able to turn off 9,000 steers per annum for live export to Asia and the Middle East.

== History ==
The station was initially established by Patrick Durack and his brother Michael, who founded the station in 1893.

Kimberley Durack first experimented with growing cash crops in the fertile soil of the floodplains, which later led to the establishment of the Ord River Scheme. An experimental farm was established on the Ord in 1941 and then closed in 1945 when joint Commonwealth-State Research Station was completed at Ivanhoe. The station experimented with crops such as rice, linseed and cane sugar for the next 12 years. Kununurra was built on land resumed from Ivanhoe Station during 1961, as the town for the Ord River Irrigation Area, which started as the Ord River Project or Ord Scheme, with survey work starting in 1959.

Ivanhoe Crossing, built in 1954 on a rocky outcrop to cross the Ord river, was featured in the film Australia when Lady Sarah Ashley is brought to Faraway Downs station. The crossing is close to where the Duracks constructed the Ivanhoe Station homestead and the unusual sandstone formation named "City of Ruins".

The local Aboriginal peoples, the Miriuwung and Gajirrawoong, are the traditional owners of the area. The labour force of the station was often provided by these peoples, who lived and worked on the property often under terrible conditions. Aboriginal workers were often not paid wages and only received rations for their labour until the Pastoral Award was introduced in 1968. At Ivanhoe in 1961, 90 Aboriginal people were living in three huts.

== See also ==
- List of ranches and stations
