= Miriwoong language =

Aboriginal Australian language of the Kimberley region in Western Australia

Miriwoong
- Region: Kununurra, Western Australia
- Ethnicity: Miriwung
- Native speakers: 168 (2021 census)
- Revival: exist
- Language family: Jarrakan: Miriwoong
- Dialects: Gajirrawung †; ?Dulbung †; Wardanybeng
- Signed forms: Miriwoong Sign Language

Language codes
- ISO 639-3: mep
- Glottolog: miri1266
- AIATSIS: K29
- ELP: Miriwoong
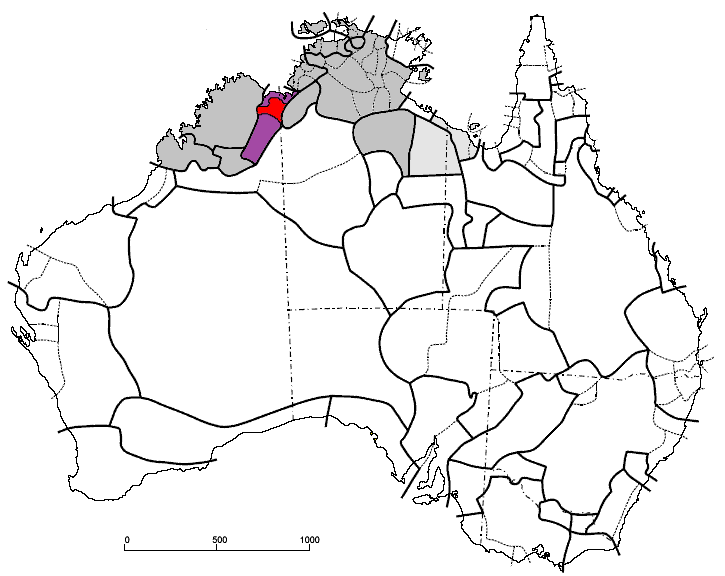
- (red) Miriwoong language (purple) other Jarrakan languages (grey) other non-Pama-Nyungan languages

Miriwoong, also written Miriuwung and Miriwung, is an Aboriginal Australian language which today has fewer than 20 fluent speakers, most of whom live in or near Kununurra in Western Australia. All of the fluent speakers are elderly and the Miriwoong language is considered to be critically endangered. However, younger generations tend to be familiar with a lot of Miriwoong vocabulary which they use when speaking Kimberley Kriol or Aboriginal English, and there is active language revitalization.

== Country ==
Ancestral Miriwoong territory covered an estimated 4,000 square miles (10,000 km^{2}) and extended from the valley of the Ord River north to Carlton Hill Station, upstream to Ivanhoe Station, and east to Newry Station, and along the Keep River to near the coastal swamps.

== Linguo-genetic categorisation ==
Miriwoong is categorised by linguists as a Non-Pama-Nyungan language and part of the Jarrakan subgroup.

== Sign ==
As is common in many Australian language communities, the Miriwoong people have a signed language that is used in addition to the spoken languages of the community.

== Multilingualism ==
Despite the endangered status of the Miriwoong language, the Miriwoong community is vibrantly multilingual. Languages spoken include Miriwoong (for a small number of speakers), the Miriwoong signed language, Kimberley Kriol, and English. Two varieties of English are present in the community, Aboriginal English, and Standard Australian English. Many speakers are bi-dialectical in both varieties while many others have a strong preference for Aboriginal English.

== Mirima Dawang Woorlab-gerring ==
The Mirima Dawang Woorlab-gerring Language and Culture Centre has been tasked with the preservation and revitalisation of the Miriwoong language since the 1970s.

MDWg engages in a wide range of language revitalisation and documentation activities including a language nest, public language classes and on-country training camps. The language nest reaches around 300 children every week, both Indigenous and Non-Indigenous.

A significant part of MDWg's revitalisation efforts is the publication of books in Miriwoong.

== Some linguistic features ==
=== Phonology ===
==== Vowels ====
The vowel system of Miriwoong comprises the following four vowel phonemes. Length is not phonemic.

	front	central	back
high	i		u
mid		ə	
low		a	

==== Consonants ====
Miriwoong distinguishes 19 consonant phonemes. The consonant inventory of Miriwoong is fairly typical for Indigenous Australian languages, having multiple lateral and nasal consonants, no voicing contrast, and no fricatives.

	Peripheral		Laminal		Apical	
	Bilabial	Velar	Lamino- dental	Lamino- palatal	Alveolar	Retroflex
Plosive	b	g	d̪	ɟ	d	ɖ
Nasal	m	ŋ	n̪	ɲ	n	ɳ
Trill					r	
Lateral				ʎ	l	ɭ
Approximant	w		j		ɻ	

/ɻ/ may be heard as either [ɻ] or [ɹ].

=== Orthography ===
The largely phonemic orthography of Miriwoong was developed at the Mirima Dawang Woorlab-gerring. Some sounds that do not have a standard character in the Latin script are represented by digraphs. The vowel /u/ is spelled oo in Miriwoong.

Grapheme	IPA symbol	Miriwoong example	English translation
Vowels			
a	a	dawang	place
e	ə	jawaleng	man
oo	u	joolang	dog
i	i	ngirrngiling	cat
iyi	i: ~ iji	ngiyi	yes
Monograph consonants			
b	b	bare	to stand
d	d	dooleng	heart
g	g	goondarring	fish
j	c~ɟ	wija	swim
K (only following n)	g	bankalng	footprints
l	l	biligirrimawoong	white
m	m	moonamang	magpie goose
n	n	Goonoonooram	Kununurra (river)
r	ɻ ~ ɹ	ramang	grass
w	w	woothoony	small (f)
y	j	mayeng	non-meat food
Digraph consonants			
ly	ʎ	bilyiny	tick
ng	ŋ	ngerregoowoong	big
nh	n̪	ngenhengbeng	red
ny	ɲ	gerany	rock
rd	ɖ	gardag	cup
rl	ɭ	gerloong	water
rn	ɳ	merndang	paper
rr	r	Darram	Bandicoot Bar (place name)
th	d̪	thegoobeling	black

MDWg is working with local organisations to conform to the standardised orthography when Miriwoong is written in documents or signage.

See also: Transcription of Australian Aboriginal languages

=== Grammar ===
Some notable features of Miriwoong grammar are as follows:

==== Nouns ====
===== Gender =====
Miriwoong nouns have grammatical gender and adjectives and demonstratives agree with the noun. There are two genders, designated masculine and feminine.

===== Case =====
Nouns are not marked for case in Miriwoong, although arguments are cross-referenced on the verb, in most cases using a nominative-accusative pattern.

==== Verbs ====
Verbs in Miriwoong have a compound system of coverbs, which are generally uninflected and carry the main semantic content, and inflecting verbs, which carry the grammatical information. Both coverbs and verbs can stand alone but most verbal expressions comprise both a coverb and an inflecting verb (Newry 2015: 20-21). The inflecting verbs are a closed class and number around 20 while the coverbs are an open class. This type of verb system has been observed in other Australian languages, particularly in languages spoken in the north of Australia.

== Other sources ==
- Galbat-Newry, G., (September 4, 2016) Miriwoong waniwoogeng! Language is the only way to understand our ancient culture. The Guardian: Australian Edition
- Kofod, F. M. (1978). The Miriwung language (East Kimberley): a phonological and morphological study.
- Kofod, FM, 1976. Simple and Compound Verbs: Conjugation by Auxiliaries in Australian Verbal System: Miriwung. Canberra: Australian Institute for Aboriginal Studies.
- Olawsky, Knut, J. (2010) Revitalisation Strategies for Miriwoong In Re-awakening languages: theory and practice in the revitalisation of Australia's indigenous languages. In Hobson, J., Lowe, K., Poetics, S. & Walsh, M. (Eds.) Sydney University Press: Sydney
- Olawsky, Knut J., 2010. Going public with language: involving the wider community in language revitalisation. In J. Hobson, K. Lowe, S. Poetsch and M. Walsh (eds.), Re-Awakening Languages: Theory and Practice in the Revitalisation of Australia’s Indigenous Languages. Sydney, Australia: Sydney University Press, pp. 75.
- Olawsky, Knut, 2013. The Master-Apprentice language learning program down under: experience and adaptation in an Australian context. Language documentation and conservation, 7
- McGregor, William (1988). Handbook of Kimberley languages. Department of Linguistics, Research School of Pacific Studies, Australian National University.
- McGregor, William (2004). The Languages of the Kimberley, Western Australia. London, New York: Taylor & Francis. ISBN 0-415-30808-9.
- Galbat-Newry, G., (2002) Mirima Dawang Woorlab-gerring Language and Culture Centre. Ngoonjook: A Journal of Australian Indigenous Issues. 21 26-49.
- Tindale, Norman Barnett (1974). Aboriginal Tribes of Australia: Their Terrain, Environmental Controls, Distribution, Limits, and Proper Names. Australian National University. ISBN 978-0-708-10741-6.

== Miriwoong language books ==
- Boombi, Rita; Boombi, Rosemary; Woerde, Stephanie (2014). Yangge Yindajgoo! - Ask me. Kununurra, Australia: Mirima Dawang Woorlab-gerring. ISBN 978-0-9922849-3-0.
- Galbat-Newry, Glennis (2012). Woorlab yarrenkoo Miriwoong! - Miriwoong Animals. Kununurra, Australia: Mirima Dawang Woorlab-gerring.
- Galbat-Newry, Glennis (2013). Woorlab barrenkoonan Miriwoong! Keep talking Miriwoong! : Miriwoong animals 2. Kununurra, Australia: Mirima Dawang Woorlab-gerring. ISBN 978-0-9922849-0-9.
- Mirima Dawang Woorlab-gerring (2013). Miriwoong Seasonal Calendar. Kununurra, Australia: Mirima Dawang Woorlab-gerring.
- Newry, Dawayne (2012). Warlayi - Cooking meat in the earth oven. Kununurra, Australia: Mirima Dawang Woorlab-gerring. ISBN 978-0-9922849-5-4.
- Newry, Dawayne (2015). Ninggoowoong boorriyang merndang - Family book. Kununurra, Australia: Mirima Dawang Woorlab-gerring.
- Ningarmara, Ingrid; Dilyai, Nancy (2015). Woorre-Woorrem - My community Flying-Fox. Kununurra, Australia: Mirima Dawang Woorlab-gerring. ISBN 978-0-9922849-4-7.
- Simon, Pamela; Galbat, Paulina (2011). Woorrjilwarim - Molly Springs. Kununurra, Australia: Mirima Dawang Woorlab-gerring.
