= Jirrawun Arts =

Art centre in Australia

Jirrawun Arts was a company and art centre owned by Indigenous Australians, founded in 1998 and operating first from Kununurra and later (2006 onwards) from Wyndham, Western Australia. It was notable as the base for contemporary Indigenous Australian artists of the eastern Kimberley region, including Paddy Bedford and Freddie Timms. It was also touted as a model for the administration of Indigenous art in Australia. A decision was taken by the owners in 2010 to close the centre and sell its property.

== Foundation ==
Contemporary Indigenous painting in the eastern Kimberley region had its origins in the "prophetic dream" of one of the senior Indigenous stockmen of the area, Rover Thomas. Thomas began painting around 1982 and went on to become one of the country's most significant artists. Aided by art workers and advisers including gallerist and art dealer Mary Macha, he also encouraged other community members to take up the brush. These other elders-turned-artists included Queenie McKenzie and Freddie Timms.

Jirrawun Arts was founded in Kununurra in 1998. Its genesis lay in a 1996 meeting in Melbourne between gallerist Tony Oliver and Freddie Timms, who "knew that the cheap suit and envelope containing $300 he received after completing a month's worth of painting for a commercial gallery in Melbourne was not a true reflection of his worth". His conversation with Oliver led ultimately to the foundation of a private company, its board headed by Timms and with Oliver as its chief executive officer, the purpose of which was to ensure the financial security of artists who could then focus on their painting.

Paintings by Jirrawun Arts members were part of the Blood on the Spinifex exhibition at the Ian Potter Museum of Art, Melbourne University, in 2003.

== Expansion, relocation, and closure ==
Since being founded to assist established Kimberley artists, Jirrawun went on to mentor new younger artists, and to operate as a philanthropic organisation. It supported the Kununurra Youth at Risk Program and a health advocacy organisation known as Jirrawun Health. The board included a mix of Indigenous and non-Indigenous expertise, and the organisation has in the past received support from the Argyle diamond mine, located in the region.

In 2006 Jirrawun Arts relocated from Kununurra to Wyndham, where it operated out of a purpose-built facility. In 2007 Jirrawun Arts, along with another Indigenous-owned arts company Papunya Tula Artists, was praised by an Australian Senate committee for delivering significant benefits to the Indigenous community.

Following the death of Paddy Bedford, the owners decided to wind up the business and sell its assets.

== Bibliography ==
- Rothwell, Nicolas (2007). Another Country. Melbourne, Victoria: Black Inc. ISBN 978-1-86395-382-5.
