= Legune Station =

Pastoral lease and cattle station in Northern Territory

Coordinates: 15.2152°S 129.44488°E

Location in the Northern Territory

Legune Station is a pastoral lease that operates as a cattle station in the Northern Territory of Australia.

Situated close to the border of Western Australia, it is approximately 130 kilometres (81 mi) east of Kununurra and 220 kilometres (137 mi) east of the live export port of Wyndham in Western Australia and 340 kilometres (211 mi) south-west of Darwin in the Northern Territory.

The property occupies a total area of 1,800 square kilometres (695 sq mi), including a 600 square kilometres (232 sq mi) portion of floodplain country adjacent to the Ord River. It is capable of carrying 32,000 head of cattle.

In 2014 the property had been placed on the market for an estimated A$60 million; it had been last listed in 2008 with a A$70 million price tag.

Legune was originally an outstation of the Victoria River Downs Station.

The property was acquired by Leslie Joseph Hooker at some time prior to 1980. Hooker sold the property to the Malaysian Sabah state government in the early 1980s for A$2 million.

In 2014 Legune was owned by the same families behind Sunny Queen Farms who wanted to sell to focus on their pig and poultry interests. The chairman of the board, Brian McLean, said the property had enormous development potential particularly in the area of aquaculture as it backed onto the Ord Irrigation project and had its own 50,000 megalitres (65,397,531 cu yd) dam on site.

== See also ==
- List of ranches and stations
