= Piccaninny crater =

Impact structure in Western Australia

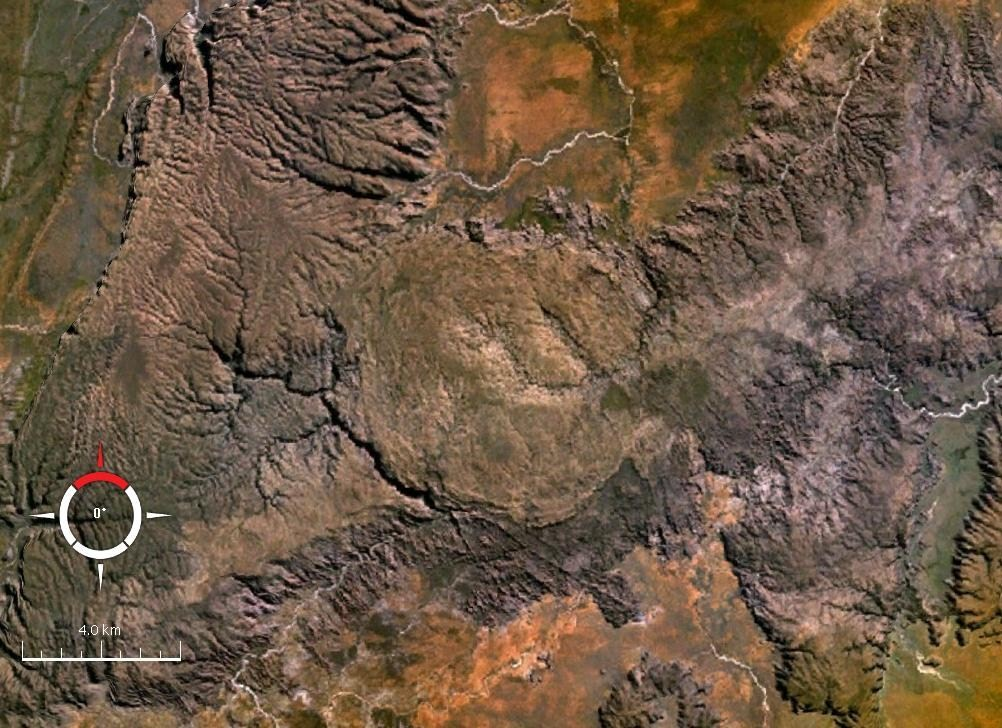
- Landsat image of the deeply eroded remnant of Piccaninny crater (circular feature in centre); screen capture from the NASA World Wind program

- Location within Western Australia
- Location: Purnululu (Bungle Bungle) National Park, Western Australia, Australia; 17°25′30″S 128°26′10″E

Impact crater structure
- Confidence: Confirmed
- Diameter: 7 km (4.3 mi)
- Age: <360 Ma <Devonian
- Exposed: Yes
- Drilled: No

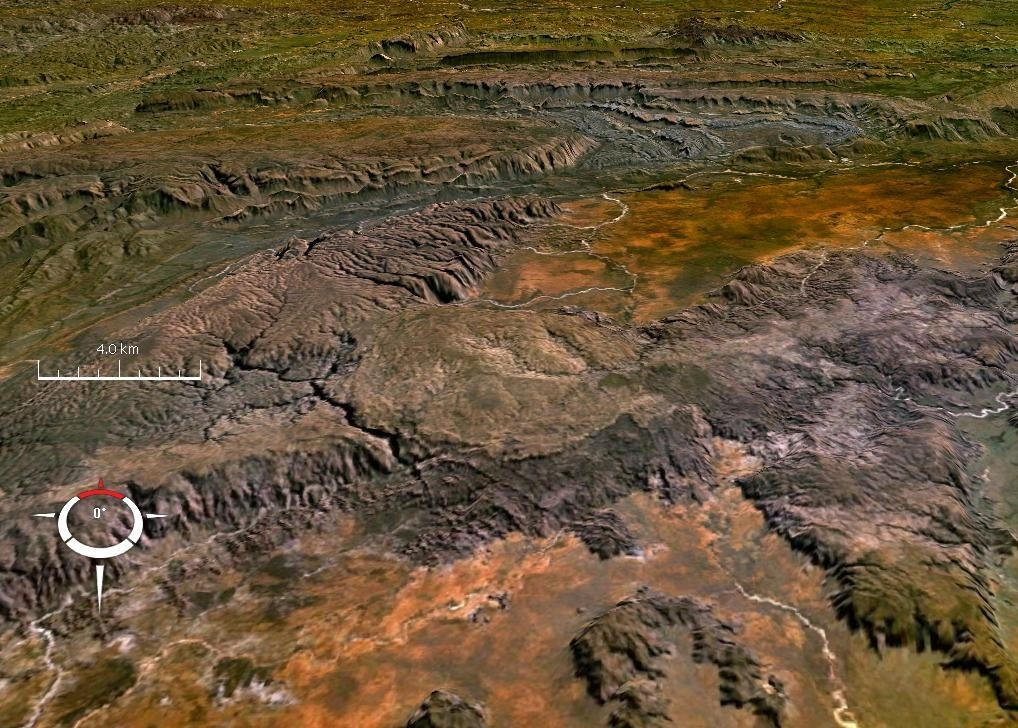
Oblique Landsat image draped over digital elevation data (x3 vertical exaggeration), eroded remnant of Piccaninny crater (circular feature in centre); screen capture from the NASA World Wind program

Piccaninny crater is an impact structure, the eroded remnant of a former impact crater, situated in northern Western Australia in the Kimberley region. It was named after Piccaninny Creek and lies within the Purnululu (Bungle Bungle) National Park.

== Description ==
The site is marked by a circular topographic feature on top of the flat-topped sandstone and conglomerate Bungle Bungle Range, clearly visible on remotely sensed images. When first reported in 1983 after aerial observation, it was interpreted as either an impact structure or a cryptovolcanic feature. Later ground examination by E.M. and C.S. Shoemaker confirmed the presence of types of deformation confirming an impact origin.

The circular topographic feature is 7 km in diameter, although due to the amount of erosion the original crater may have been larger. It has been estimated that the present land surface is 1–2 km below the original crater floor. The impact event has not been dated, and must be younger than the Devonian age of the rocks in the area, but is clearly not recent because of the amount of erosion.
