= Kimberley Echo =

Newspaper in Western Australia

- Founded: 28 April 1980
- Language: English
- City: Kununurra, Western Australia
- Country: Australia
- ISSN: 0159-7701

The Kimberley Echo is a Kununurra, Western Australia based community newspaper.

== History ==
It was founded in 1980 by James O'Kenny, and Brian Cole.

It was a fortnightly paper from 1980 to 1993, and then became weekly in 1993. National Library and Battye Library holdings details show changes in publication.

In 2007, the newspaper was acquired by West Australian Newspaper Holdings. The Australian Competition & Consumer Commission investigated the sale, but did not oppose it.
