= Kimberley Land Council =

Organization of indigenous peoples in Kimberley region of Western Australia

Kimberley Land Council Aboriginal Corporation, known as Kimberley Land Council (KLC), is an association of Aboriginal people in the Kimberley region of Western Australia. The land council was formed at a meeting at Noonkanbah Station in May 1978. The corporation is registered with the Office of the Registrar of Indigenous Corporations as ICN (Indigenous Corporation Number) 21.

The introduction of the Native Title Act 1993 saw the KLC as the native title representative body for Kimberley traditional owners. In the years 1998 to 2007, Federal Court native title litigation was successful for the following claims:

- Miriuwung and Gajerrong
- Karajarri
- Tjurabalan
- Bardi Jawi
- Wanjina Wunggurr, for the Ngarinyin/Wilinggin people
- Rubibi (Broome), for the Yawuru people

The Uunguu (Wunambal) and Dambimangari (Worrorra) determinations, which formed part of Wanjina Wunggurr claim, were made in May 2011.

== Sources ==
- Kimberley Land Council. Annual report. Derby, W.A.: The Council. (1995-)
