= Gajirrawoong dialect =

Aboriginal language of Western Australia

Gajirrabeng
- Region: The Kimberley, Western Australia; Northern Territory, north coast from Wyndham to mouth of Victoria River and inland
- Ethnicity: Gadjerong
- Native speakers: 1-10 (2018)
- Language family: Jarrakan: Miriwung; Gajirrabeng

Language codes
- ISO 639-3: gdh
- Glottolog: gadj1243
- AIATSIS: K37.1
- ELP: Gajirrabeng

Gajirrawoong, also written Gajirrabeng, Gadjerawang, Gadjerong, Gadyerong and Kajirrawung, is an Australian Aboriginal language of the Kimberley region in Western Australia. It is at least endangered and possibly extinct; as of 2004 it was known by only three or four fluent speakers, and in the 2016 Australian Census, there were no recorded speakers using it at home. It is in the Jarrakan language family, and is the language of the Gajirrawoong people.

The nearby Gurindji language is known to have borrowed from Gajirrawoong.
