= Freddie Timms =

Australian artist

Freddy Timms (1946, Bedford Downs Station – 2017) was an Australian indigenous artist from the Kimberley region.

== Life and art ==
Timms commenced painting on canvas in the 1990s at Turkey Creek / Warmun in the Kimberley region of Western Australia.

In 2002, a controversy that came to involve Timms, developed when writer Keith Windschuttle argued that claims made by some historians about the killing of indigenous people by white landholders were false. Windschuttle's arguments were part of a broader debate about Australian indigenous historiography and conflict between indigenous and non-indigenous Australians. One argument put in this debate was that some authors, including Windschuttle, were privileging written history (which was at that time invariably recorded by white Australians) over oral histories of indigenous people. These oral histories included accounts of the Mistake Creek massacre of indigenous people (including members of Timms' family). Angered by Windschuttle and others' claims, Timms and several other artists including Paddy Bedford created paintings documenting the events recorded in their oral histories. These paintings were exhibited in Blood on the spinifex at the Ian Potter Museum of Art in 2003.

Timms collaborated with former gallerist Tony Oliver and others to create Jirrawun Arts, a company established to assist the development and sale of works by indigenous artists from parts of the Kimberley. By 2007 the company had become one of a very small number of profitable, privately financed, indigenous-owned and controlled businesses operating in the field of indigenous art.
