= Frances Kofod =

Australian linguist working in the Kimberley, Western Australia

Frances Mary Kofod is an Australian linguist who works on codifying and preserving Australian indigenous languages of the Kimberley region. She has worked as a research assistant at the University of New England, where she earned a Master of Arts in 1978 with a thesis entitled The Miriwung language (East Kimberley): A phonological and morphological study, and at the Mirima Dawang Woorlab-gerring language and Culture Centre in Kununurra.
