= Bungle Bungle Range =

Geological feature in Kimberley region in Western Australia

Coordinates: 17.4214°S 128.4449°E

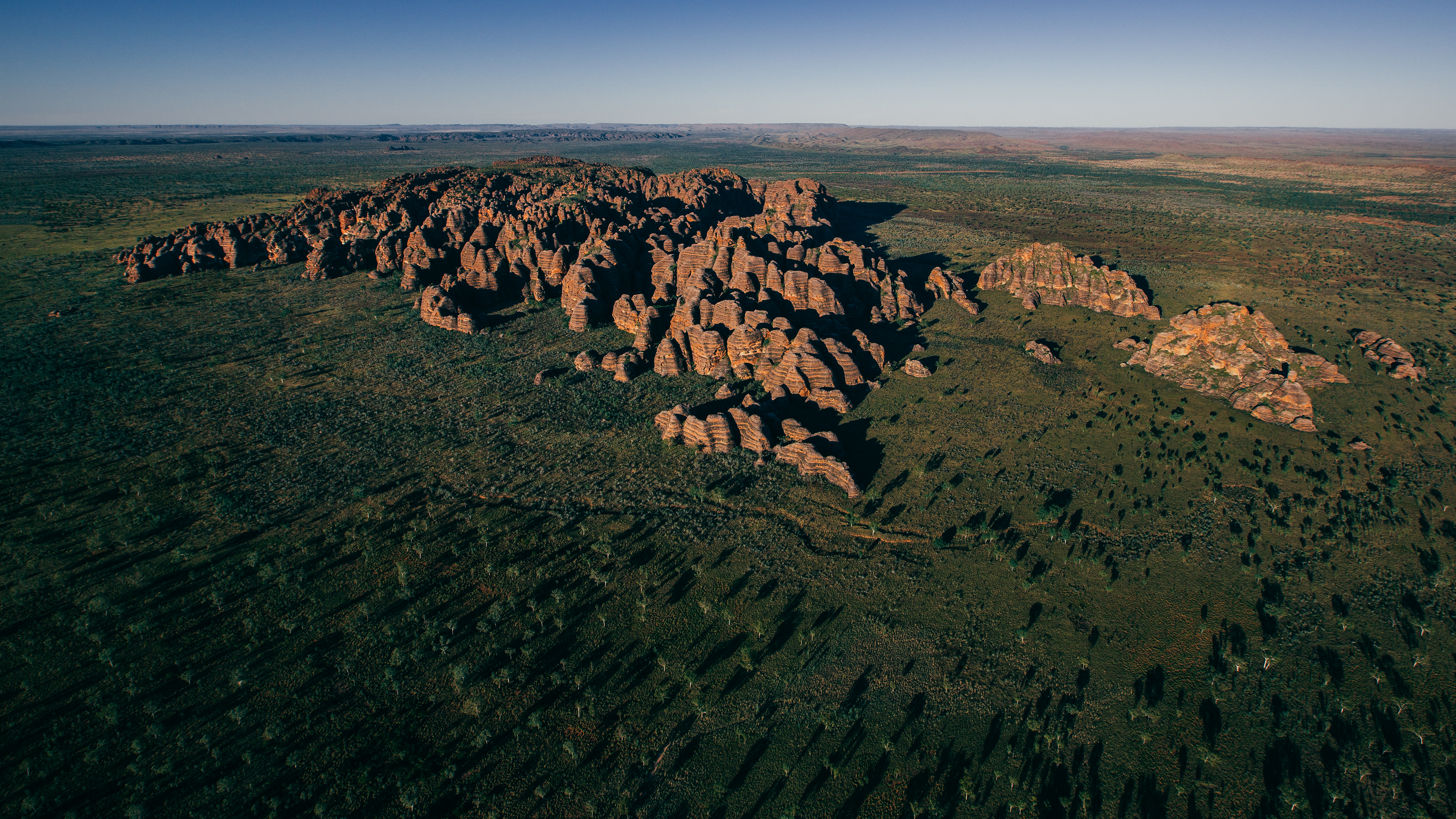
Aerial view of the Bungle Bungle range, May 2016.

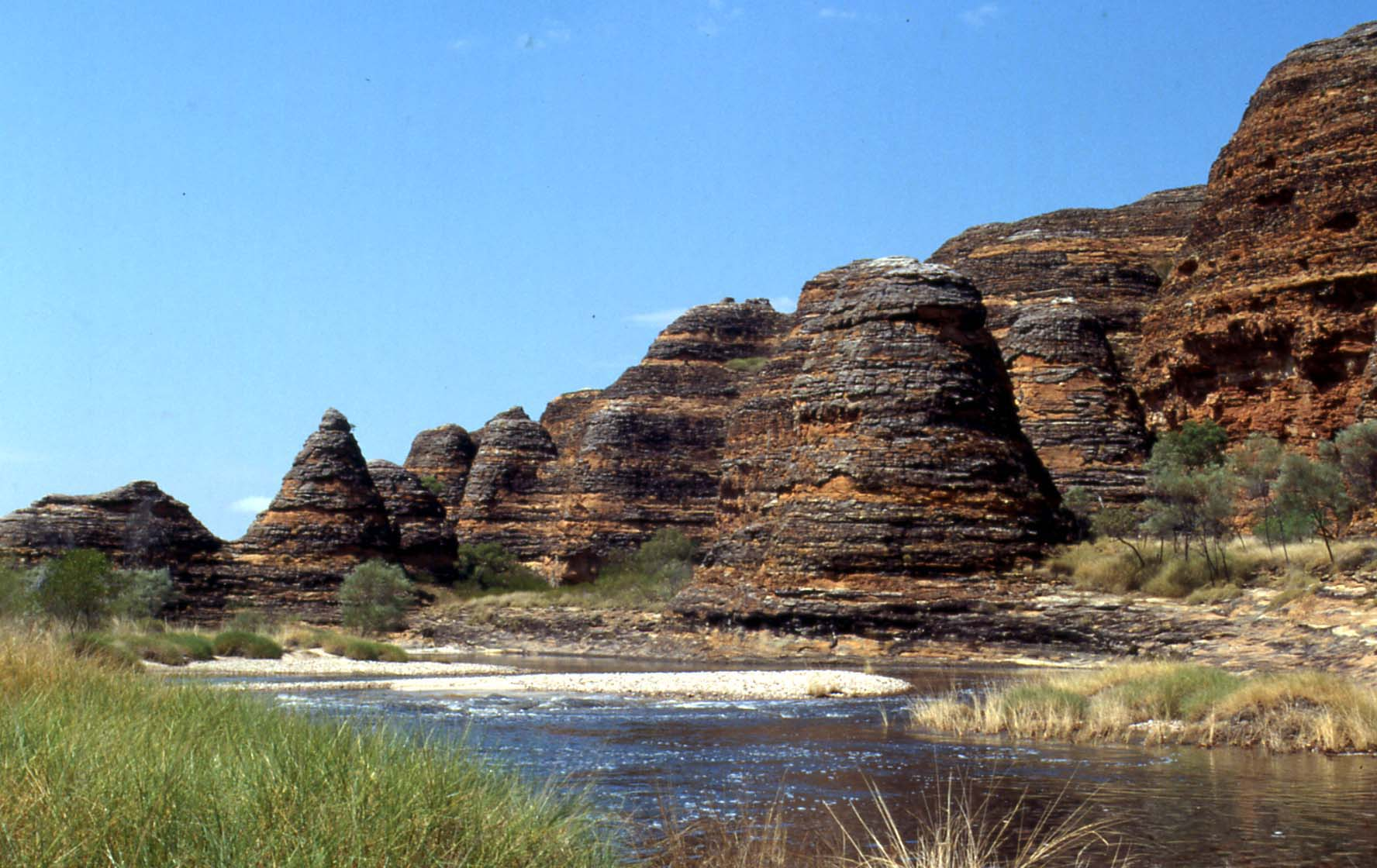
Base of range

The Bungle Bungle Range is a major landform and the main feature of the Purnululu National Park, situated in the Kimberley region of Western Australia.

== Formation ==
The distinctive beehive-shaped towers are made up of sandstones and conglomerates (rocks composed mainly of pebbles and boulders and cemented together by finer material). These sedimentary formations were deposited into the Red Basin 275 to 250 million years ago, when active faults altered the landscape. The combined effects of wind from the Tanami Desert and rainfall over millions of years shaped the domes.

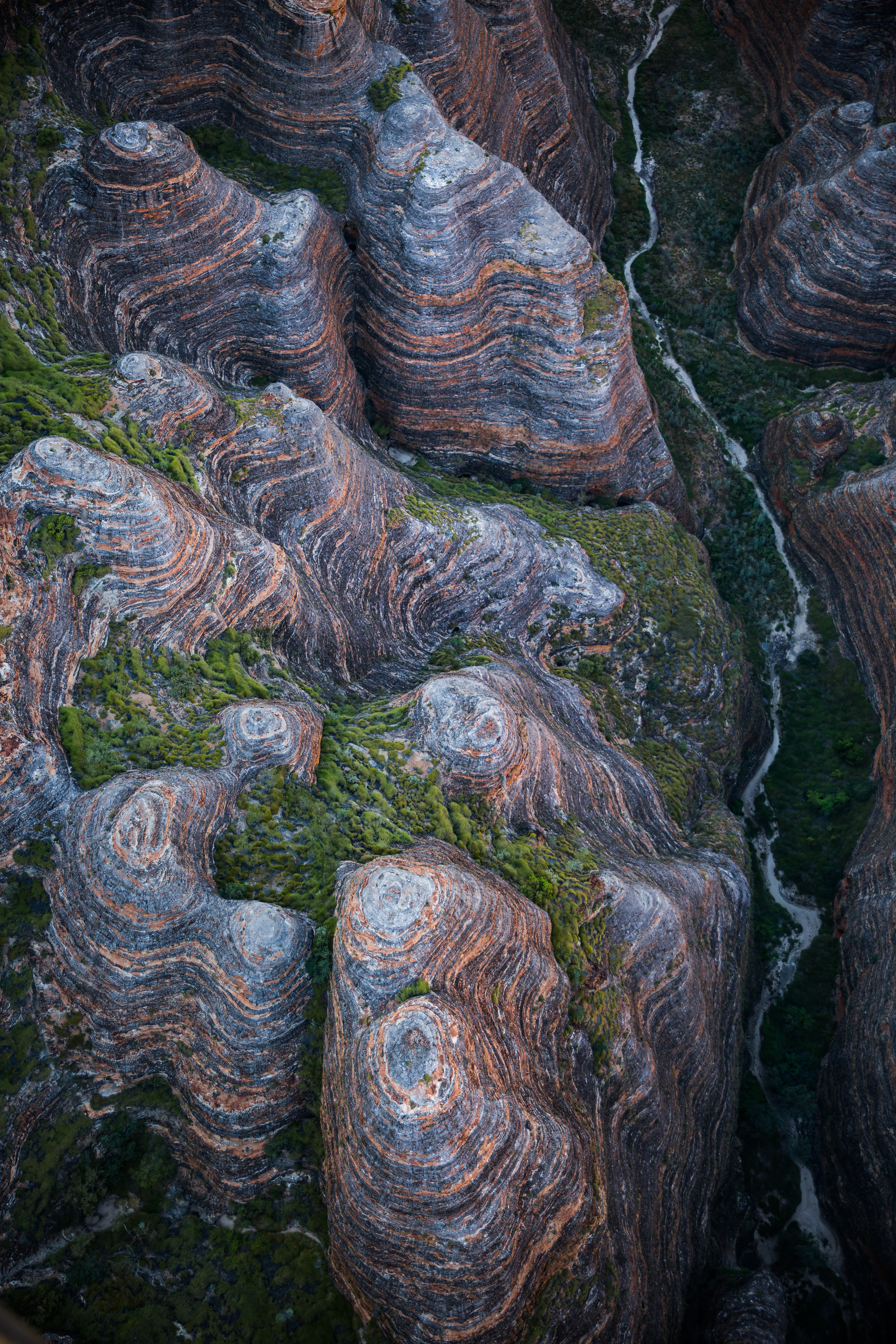
Aerial view of the Bungle Bungle Range, May 2016.

== Description ==
The range is found on the plains fringing the eastern Kimberley region. The ranges consist of stacks of ancient seabeds with layers of dolomite contained throughout them. A 7-kilometre (4.3 mi) diameter circular topographic feature is clearly visible on satellite images of the Bungle Bungle Range. It is believed that this feature is the eroded remnant of a very ancient meteorite impact crater and is known as the Piccaninny crater.

The unusual orange and dark grey banding on the conical rock formations is caused by differences in the layers of sandstone. The darker bands are on the layers of rock which hold more moisture, and are a dark algal or cyanobacteria growth. The orange coloured layers are stained with iron and manganese mineral deposits contained within the sandstone.

The Bungle Bungle Range formation occupies an area of approximately 450 square kilometres (174 sq mi).

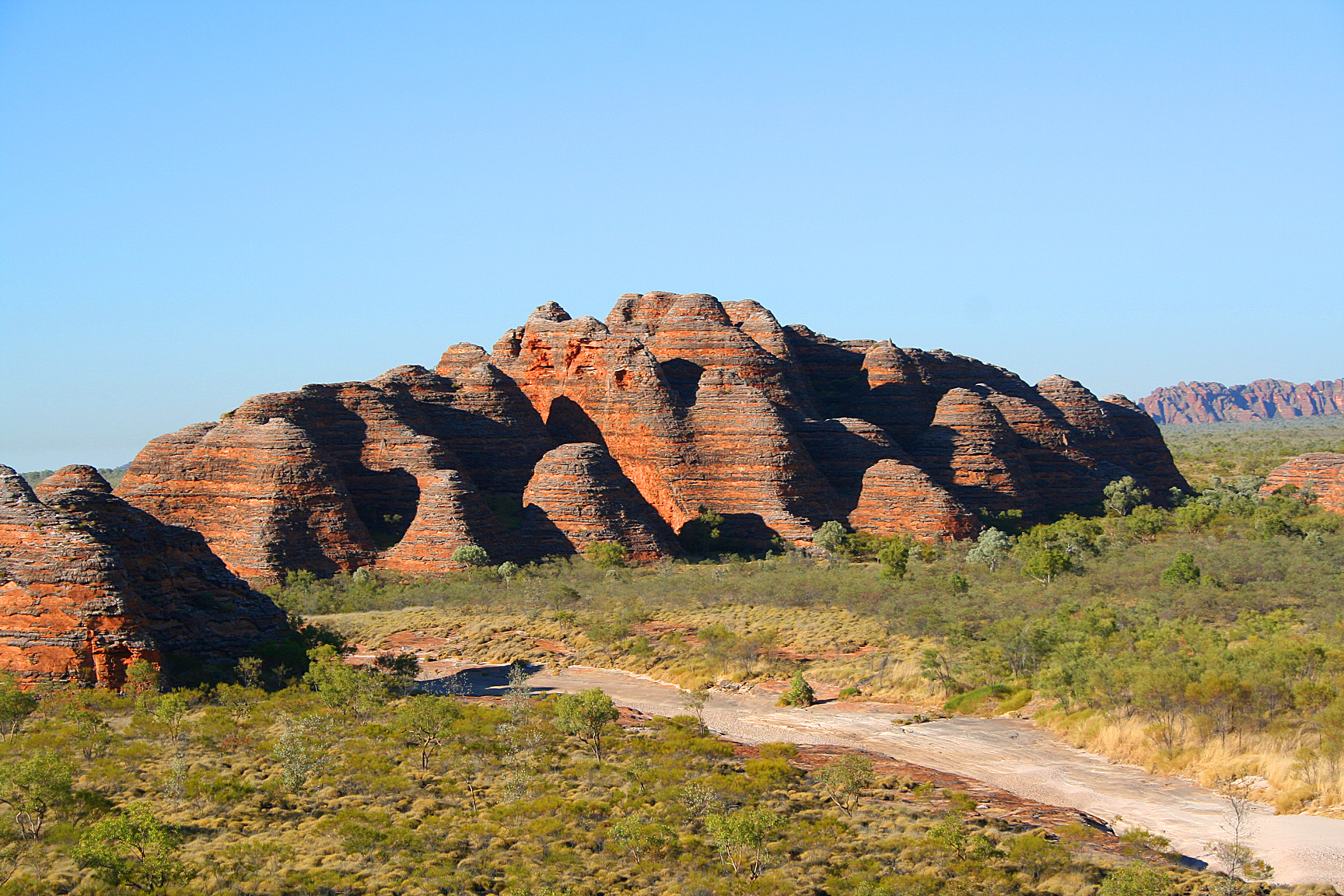
The Bungle Bungles

== History ==
In the Gija creation story, during the dream times, the Brolga stole the community's water. To get it back, the Frog hit the Brolga with a boomerang, and the falling water created the landscape.

Aboriginal people have been living in the area for over 20,000 years and continue to maintain a strong connection to this ancient landscape.

The range remained largely unknown except by local Aboriginal people and stockmen until 1982 when film-makers arrived and produced a documentary about the Kimberley. The area was gazetted as a National Park in 1987 and was also inscribed as a UNESCO World Heritage Site in 2003.

== See also ==
- Protected areas of Western Australia
- List of reduplicated Australian place names
