= Jarrakan languages =

Language family of northern Australia

Jarragan
- Jarrakan, Djeragan
- Geographic distribution: from Halls Creek to Wyndham and Kununurra along the Ord River in the eastern Kimberley region
- Linguistic classification: One of the world's primary language families
- Subdivisions: Kija; Miriwoongic

Language codes
- Glottolog: jarr1235
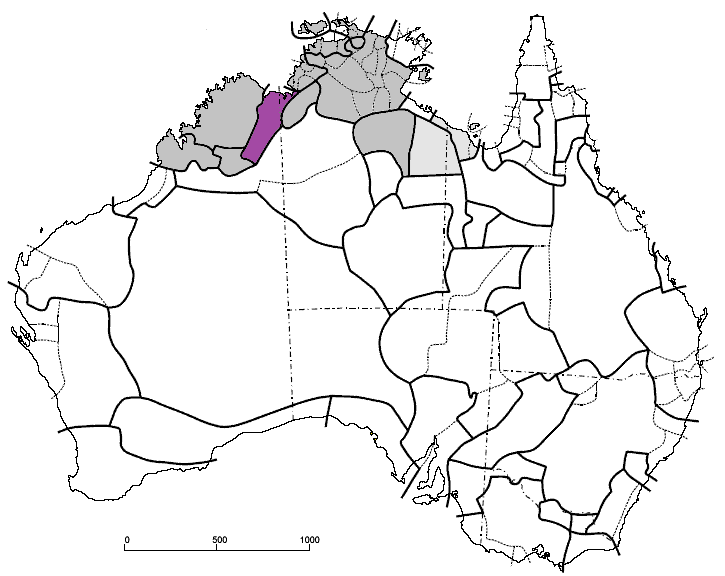
- Jarragan languages (purple), among other non-Pama-Nyungan languages (grey)
- Notes: See Gija Dictionary (Kofod et al., 2022) for standard orthography.

The Jarragan (formerly, Jarrakan or Djeragan) languages are a small family of Australian Aboriginal languages spoken in northern Australia. The name is derived from the word jarrag, which means "language" in Kija.

The three main Jarragan languages are:

- Jarragan
  - Gija (about 160 speakers)
  - Miriwoongic
    - Miriwoong (about 150 speakers)
    - Gajirrawoong †

These are divided into two groups: Gijic, consisting of only Gija, and Miriwoongic, consisting of Miriwoong and Gajirrawoong; Dixon (2002) considers the latter to be a single language.

Doolboong may also have been a Jarragan language, but this is uncertain as it is extinct and essentially unattested.

== Vocabulary ==
Capell (1940) lists the following basic vocabulary items:

English	Gija	Guluwarin	Miriwun	Gadjerong
man	djiːlin	djiɣilin	djawalaŋ	djɔːmaŋ
woman	ŋaːlil	ŋaːlil	gawilaŋ	gabilaŋ
head	guŋgulïn	dumun	gaminduŋ	guɽunjuŋ
eye	muːlu	mɔːla	mɔːl	moːl
nose	manil	njiganïn	njumbur	njumbur
mouth	ḏuwundïn	ḏuwundïn	ḏalala	ḏabandaṉ
tongue	ḏalalan	ḏalalan	ḏalala	ḏalalaŋ
stomach	djaːm	daɽwun	galdjän	raːriːŋ
bone	gwïdji	daːlïn	jaːriŋ	jaːriŋ
blood	gjauəlïn	gjauldji	garŋan	guŋulu
kangaroo	djiːriṉ	djiriṉ	djiːriŋ	djiːriŋ
opossum	laŋguṉ	naŋguṉ	guman	guman
emu	wanjäbal	madjugul	madjuguŋ	
crow	waŋgaɳa	wɔŋgaral	waŋgariŋ	waŋgadiŋ
fly	buɳul	wurŋäl	ŋurin	ŋurin
sun	baːndil	baːndil	gaŋiriṉ	baːndiṉ
moon	gaɳgiṉ	gaɳgiṉ	gangiŋ	gaɳgiŋ
fire	maɳiṉ	gidjauəlïn	gadjaːwilaŋ	maːnuŋ
smoke	wangiṉ	dulubgari	ḏuŋgi	ḏuŋgiṉ
water	guːɭiṉ	goːliṉ	gäluŋ	gaːbuŋ
