= Patrick Durack =

Australian pastoralist (1834–1898)

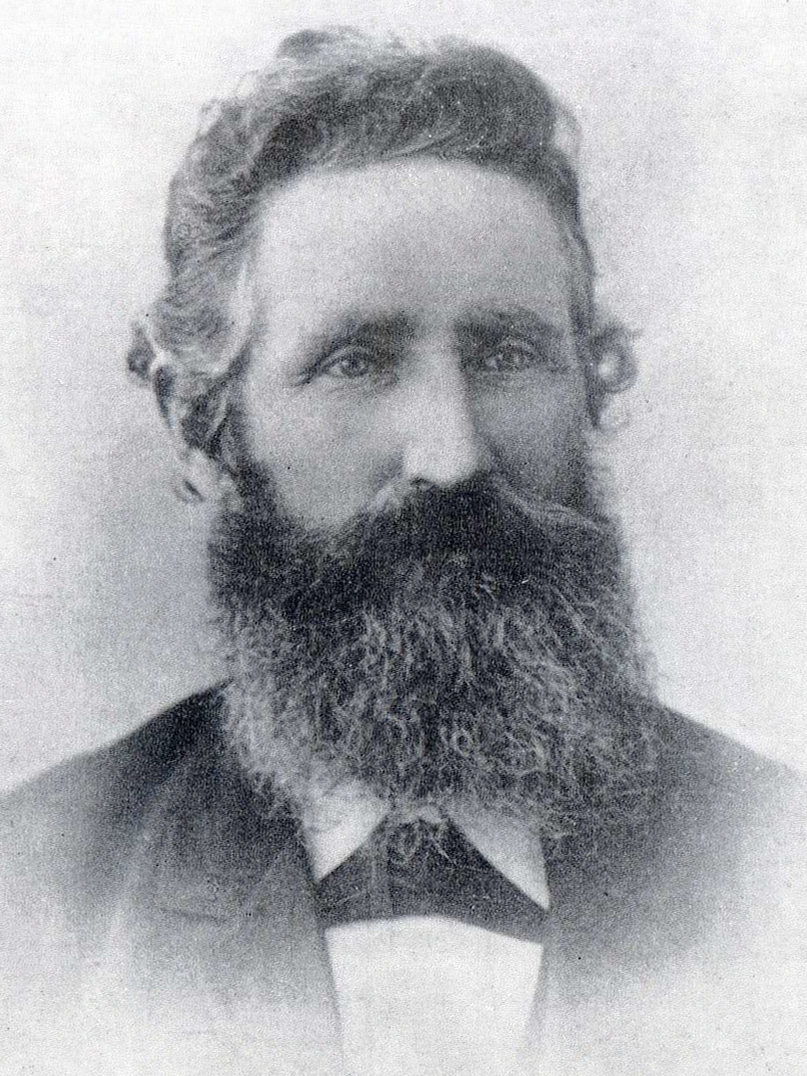
- Durack in 1880
- Born: March 1834; Scarriff, County Clare, Ireland
- Died: 20 January 1898 (aged 63); Fremantle, Western Australia
- Occupation: Pastoralist
- Spouse: Mary Costello
- Children: Michael Durack
- Parent(s): Michael Durack & Bridget Dillon

Patrick Durack (March 1834 – 20 January 1898) was a pastoral pioneer in Western Australia.

His family were struggling tenant farmers from the townland of Magherareagh near Scarriff in County Clare, Ireland, who moved from Ireland to New South Wales in 1853. Two months after arriving in New South Wales, his father, Michael was killed accidentally. He settled his mother and siblings, and moved to Victoria, returning 18 months later with £1000.

On 31 July 1862 Durack married Mary Costello, only daughter of Michael Costello, a native of County Tipperary, and his wife Mary Tully, a native of County Galway. Patrick and Mary had eight children (two of whom died in infancy), including Michael Durack.

Goulburn provided insufficient outlets for Durack's energy, land hunger and organizing powers. Along with his brother Michael and brother-in-law John Costello, they set out to establish a property in South West Queensland in 1863. Drought conditions almost killed the men, but they continued around the country pegging claims to some 44,000 square kilometres (17,000 sq mi). The men established both Kyabra and Thylungra Stations in 1868 with 100 cattle. By 1877 the Duracks had a herd of approximately 30,000 head of cattle.

Durack and his brother Michael trekked across the north of the continent from Thylungra at Coopers Creek in Queensland. They left in 1879 with 7250 breeding cattle and 200 horses, heading for the Kimberley region of Western Australia near Kununurra, arriving in 1882. The 4,800-kilometre (3,000 mi) journey of cattle to stock Argyle Downs and Ivanhoe Station is the longest of its type ever recorded.

In 1885, he retired to Brisbane. Later that year he purchased gold-crushing machinery from Sydney and began mining on the Kimberley goldfields. In 1889 he learned that financial disaster had overtaken his Queensland interests. He died in Fremantle on 20 January 1898.

Kings in Grass Castles is a 1959 novel based on his life and times by his granddaughter Dame Mary Durack. In 1998 it was the basis of a TV mini-series of the same name.
