= Purnululu National Park =

- IUCN category II (national park)
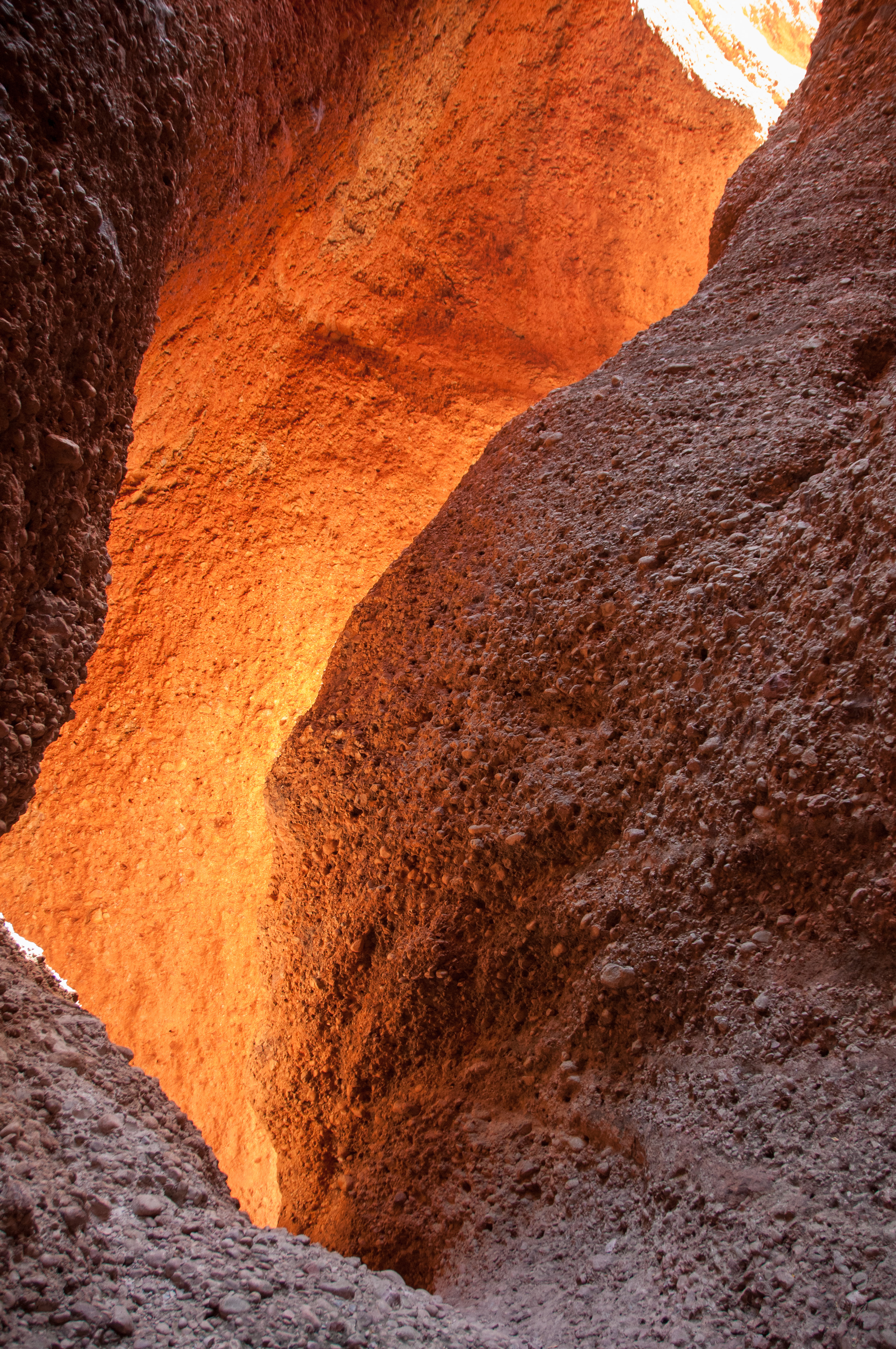
- Echidna Chasm

- Location within Western Australia
- Location: Western Australia
- Nearest city: Halls Creek
- Coordinates: 17°27′47″S 128°33′51″E
- Area: 2,397.23 km^{2} (925.58 sq mi)
- Established: 1987
- Governing body: WA Department of Parks and Wildlife
- Website: Official website

UNESCO World Heritage Site
- Criteria: Natural: vii, viii
- Reference: 1094
- Inscription: 2003 (27th Session)

The Purnululu National Park is a World Heritage Site in the East Kimberley region of Western Australia. The 239,723-hectare (592,370-acre) national park is located approximately 300 kilometres (190 mi) south of Kununurra, with Halls Creek located to the south. Declared a World Heritage Site in 2003, the park was inscribed as follows:

...[is a] remote area managed as wilderness. It includes the Bungle Bungle Range, a spectacularly incised landscape of sculptured rocks which contains superlative examples of beehive-shaped karst sandstone rising 250 metres above the surrounding semi-arid savannah grasslands. Unique depositional processes and weathering have given these towers their spectacular black and orange banded appearance, formed by biological processes of cyanobacteria (single cell photosynthetic organisms) which serve to stabilise and protect the ancient sandstone formations. These outstanding examples of cone karst that have eroded over a period of 20 million years are of great beauty and exceptional geological interest.

— Brief synthesis of Purnululu National Park as inscribed on the UNESCO World Heritage List.

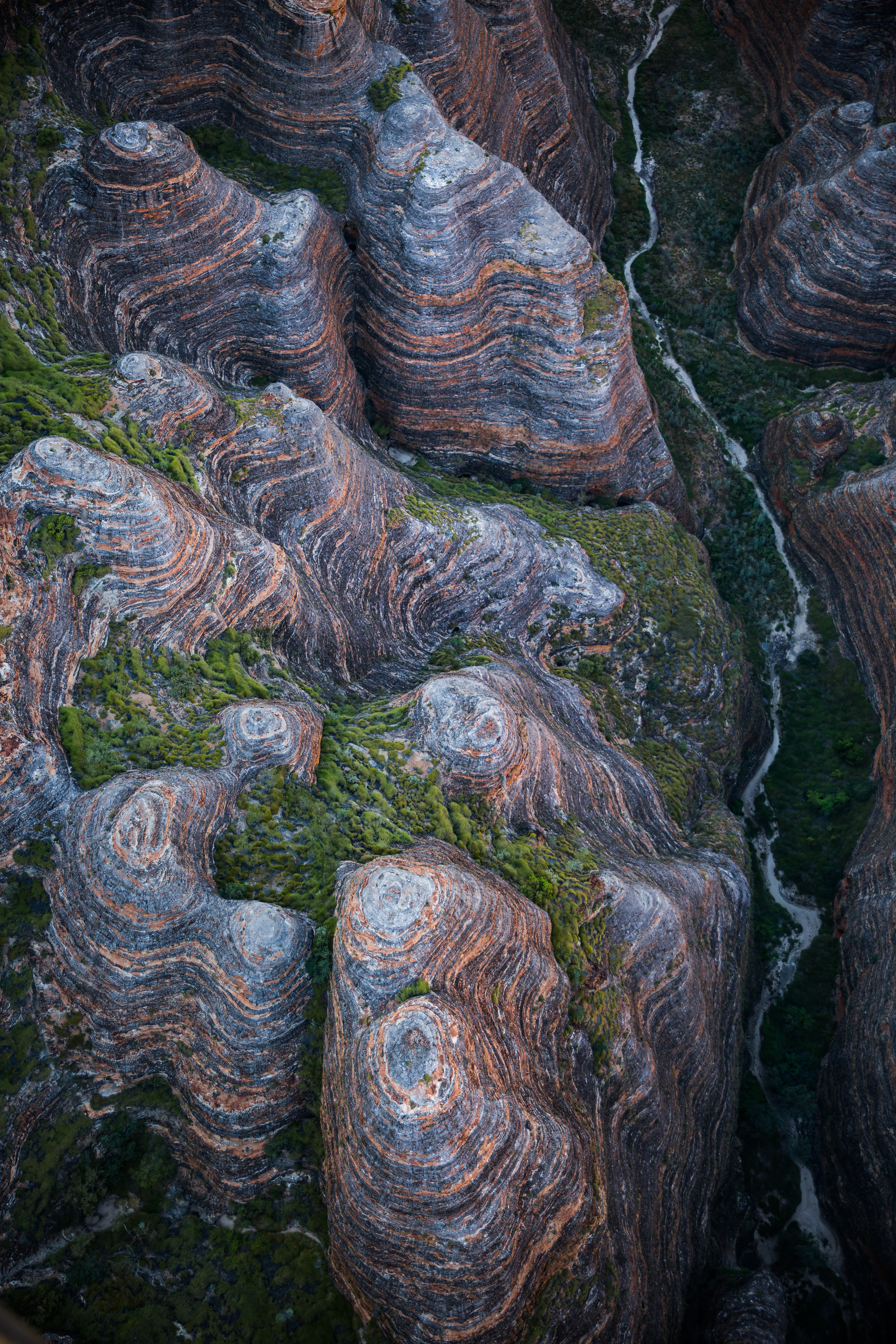
Aerial view of the Bungle Bungle range, May 2016

== World Heritage Site ==
The World Heritage status of the region was created and negotiated in 2003, and the adopted boundary of the existing national park. Since its listing, the Government of Western Australia has reserved additional areas located adjacent to the World Heritage Area, including the Purnululu Conservation Park and the Ord River Regeneration Reserve. The site was gazetted on the Australian National Heritage List on 21 May 2007 under the Environment and Heritage Legislation Amendment Act (No. 1), 2003 (Cth).

The national park is managed by the Western Australian Department of Biodiversity, Conservation and Attractions in conjunction with the traditional Aboriginal owners.

== Indigenous Peoples ==
In 2022, the Federal Court of Australia recognised both the Purnululu and Gajangana Jaru (or Northern Jaru) native title claimants as the traditional owners of the area. Purnululu National Park was the second conservation park to have traditional owners recognized after the Native Title Act 1993 was amended to allow recognition. The Bungle Bungles Aboriginal Corporation hold native title in trust for the Jaru, Gija (or Kija) and Malngin people.

In 2024, the Gija community and Western Australian Museum published an interactive display of the Gija creation story on the museum website and on an installation in the park.

== Features ==
The Bungle Bungle Range, lying fully within the park, has elevations as high as 578 metres (1,896 ft) above sea level. It is famous for the sandstone domes, unusual and visually striking with their striping in alternating orange and grey bands. The banding of the domes is due to differences in clay content and porosity of the sandstone layers: the orange bands consist of oxidised iron compounds in layers that dry out too quickly for cyanobacteria to multiply; the grey bands are composed of cyanobacteria growing on the surface of layers of sandstone where moisture accumulates.

== Geology ==
The Bungle Bungle Range is one of the most extensive and impressive occurrences of sandstone tower (or cone) karst terrain in the world. The Bungle Bungles were a plateau of Devonian sandstone, carved into a mass of beehive-shaped towers with regularly alternating, dark gray bands of cyanobacterial crust (single cell photosynthetic organisms). The plateau is dissected by 100–200-metre (330–660 ft) deep, sheer-sided gorges and slot canyons. The cone-towers are steep-sided, with an abrupt break of slope at the base and have domed summits. How they were formed is not yet completely understood. Their surface is fragile but stabilized by crusts of iron oxide and bacteria. They provide an outstanding example of land formation by dissolutional weathering of sandstone, with removal of sand grains by wind, rain and sheet wash on slopes.

== Access ==
Access to the park by road is via Spring Creek Track, from the Great Northern Highway approximately 250 kilometres (160 mi) south of Kununurra, to the track's end at the visitor centre. The track is 53 kilometres (33 mi) long and is usable only in the dry season (about 1 April to 31 December) by four-wheel-drive vehicles. Safely navigating it takes approximately three hours. Access by air is less demanding; helicopter flights are available from Bellburn Airstrip in the national park, and from Warmun roadhouse. Scenic light aircraft flights are also available out of Kununurra and Lake Argyle.

== Gallery ==
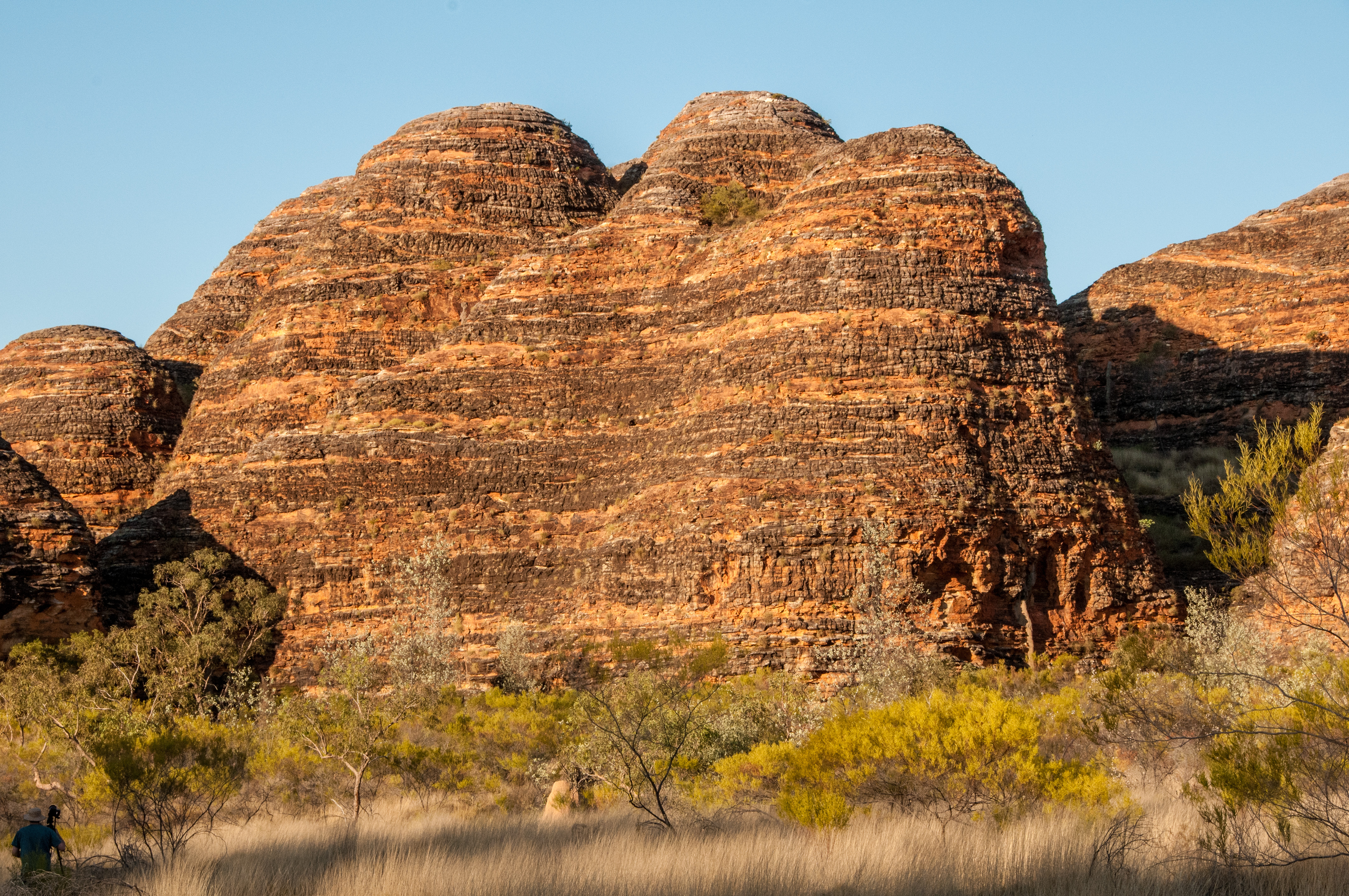
The Domes Walk

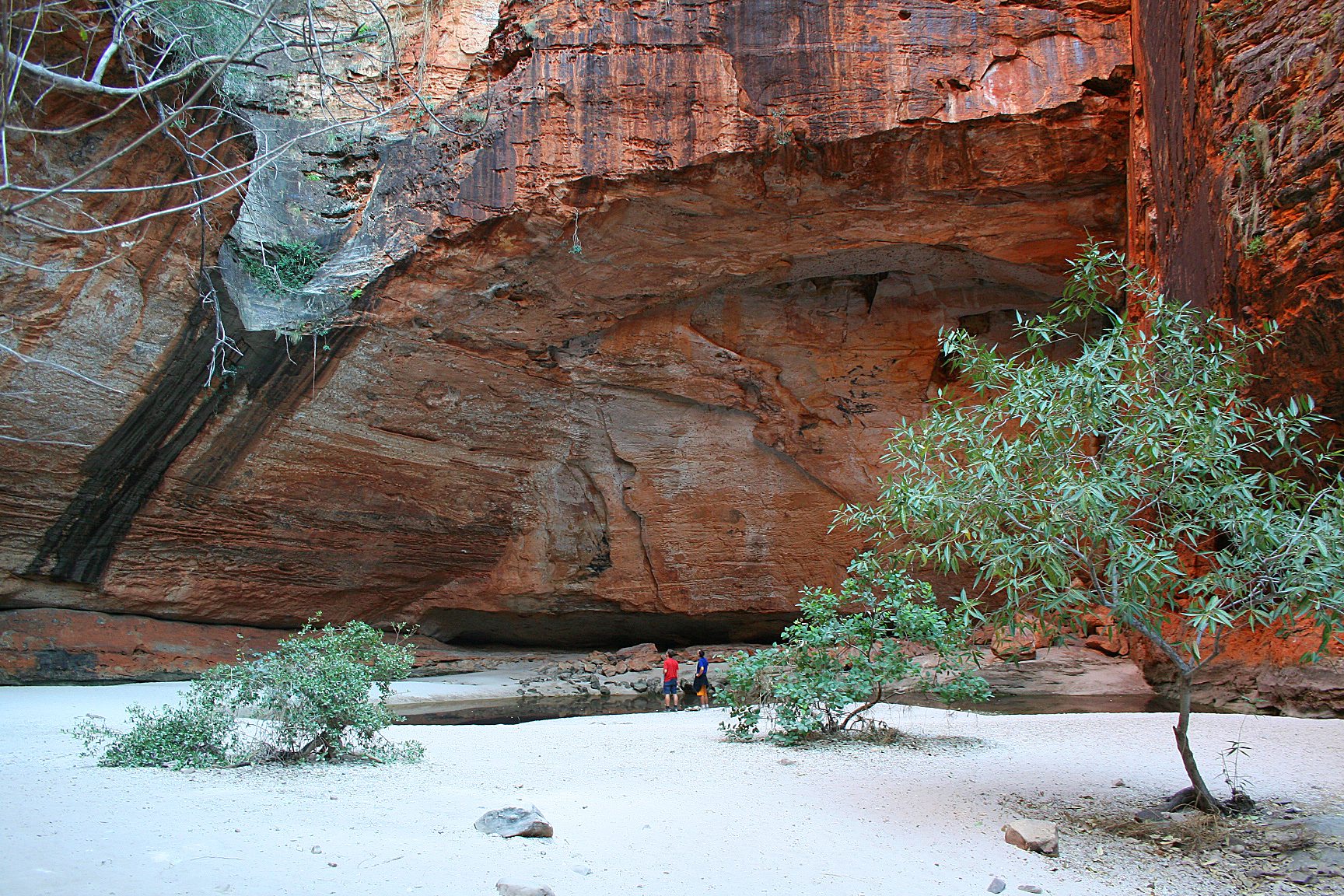
Cathedral Gorge

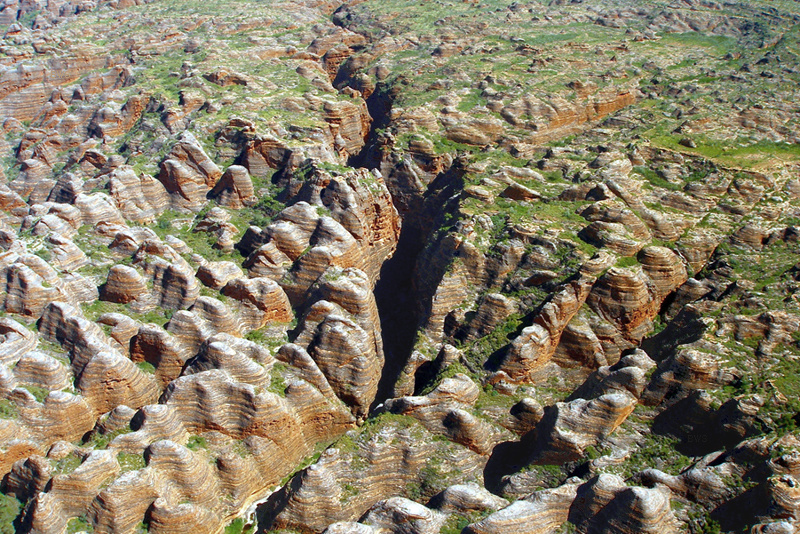
Aerial view of a canyon

== See also ==
- Protected areas of Western Australia
- Kimberley (Western Australia)
