= Kununurra, Western Australia =

Town in the Kimberley region of Western Australia

Kununurra
- Town
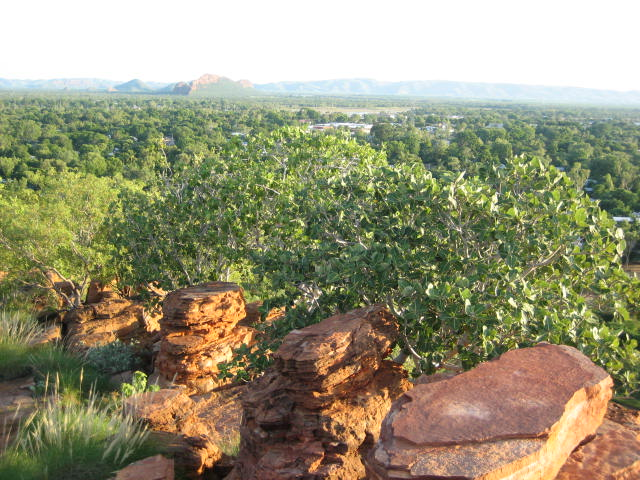
- Kununurra in summer from Hidden Valley National Park lookout

- Interactive map of Kununurra
- Coordinates: 15°46′25″S 128°44′19″E
- Country: Australia
- State: Western Australia
- LGA: Shire of Wyndham-East Kimberley
- Location: 3,214 km (1,997 mi) from Perth; 834 km (518 mi) from Darwin
- Established: 1961

Government
  - State electorate: Kimberley
  - Federal division: Durack

Area
  - Total: 2,172.5 km^{2} (838.8 sq mi)
- Elevation: 47 m (154 ft)

Population
  - Totals: 4,515 (UCL 2021); 5,494 (Locality)
- Postcode: 6743
- Mean max temp: 46.0 °C (114.8 °F)
- Mean min temp: 21.6 °C (70.9 °F)
- Annual rainfall: 790.7 mm (31.13 in)

Kununurra is a town in the far north of Western Australia located at the eastern extremity of the Kimberley approximately 45 kilometres (28 mi) from the border with the Northern Territory. Kununurra was initiated to service the Ord River Irrigation Scheme. It is located on the traditional lands of the Miriwoong, an Aboriginal Australian people.

Kununurra is the largest town in Western Australia north of Broome, with the closest town being Wyndham, 100 kilometres (62 mi) away. Kununurra is 3,040 kilometres (1,889 mi) from Perth via the Great Northern Highway.

The town is situated among the scenic hills and ranges of the far north-east Kimberley region, having an abundance of fresh water, conserved by the Ord River Diversion dam and the main Ord River Dam.

The tropical agriculture crops grown in the Ord River Irrigation Area (ORIA) have changed over the years. Tourism and mining have also become important to the local economy.

== History ==
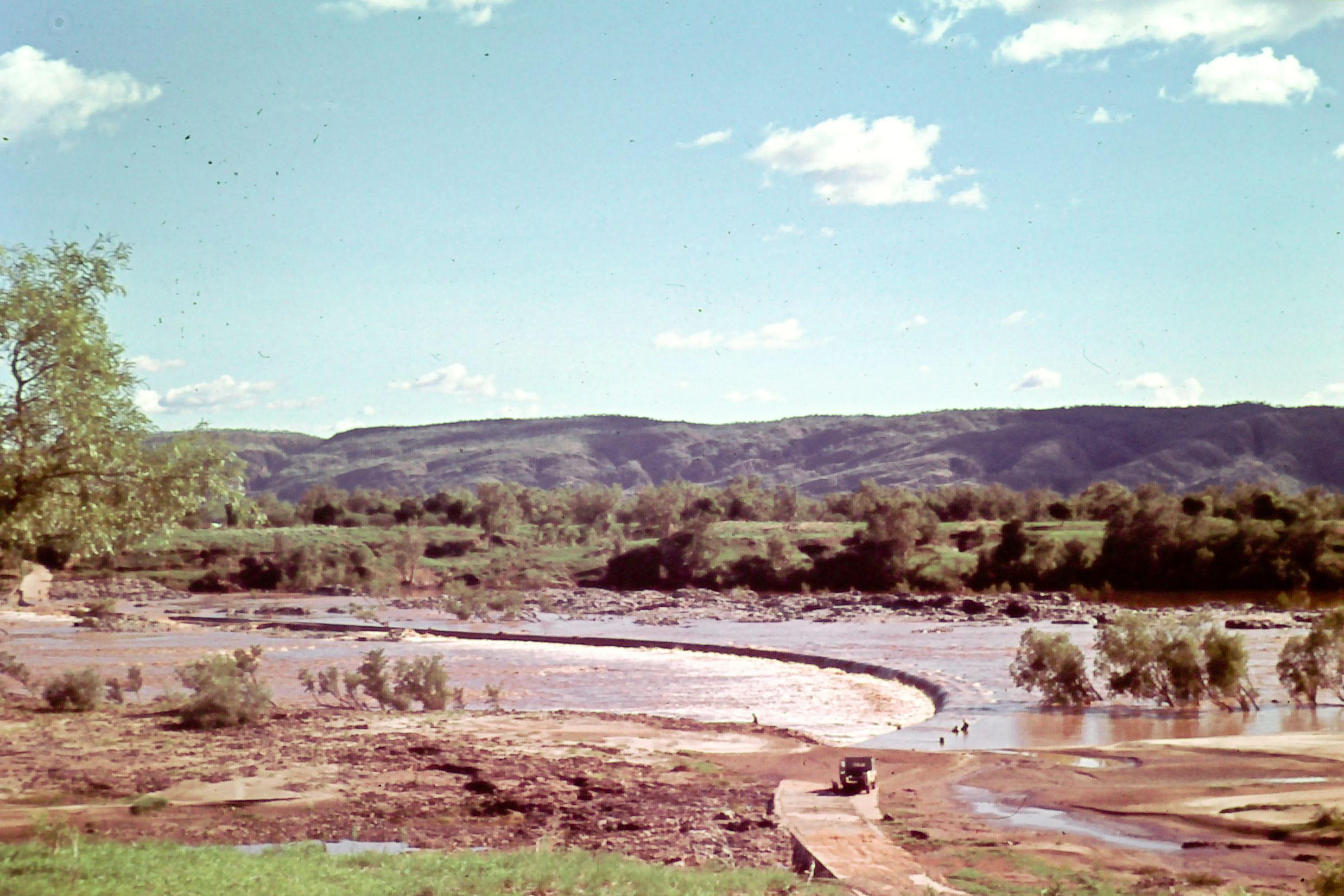
Ord river crossing prior to building of the Diversion Dam in 1961–63

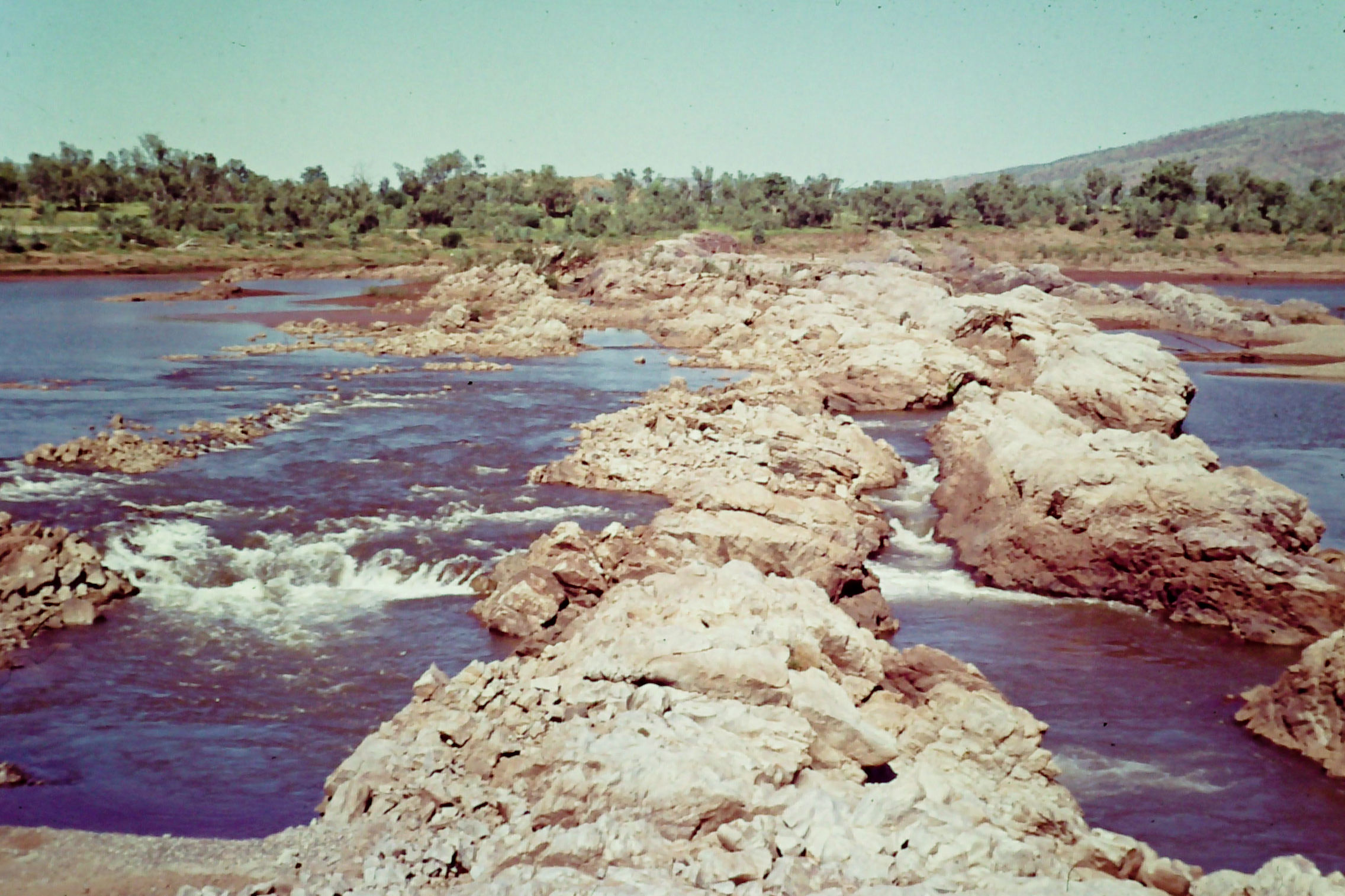
Bandicoot Bar, Ord river before construction of dam started

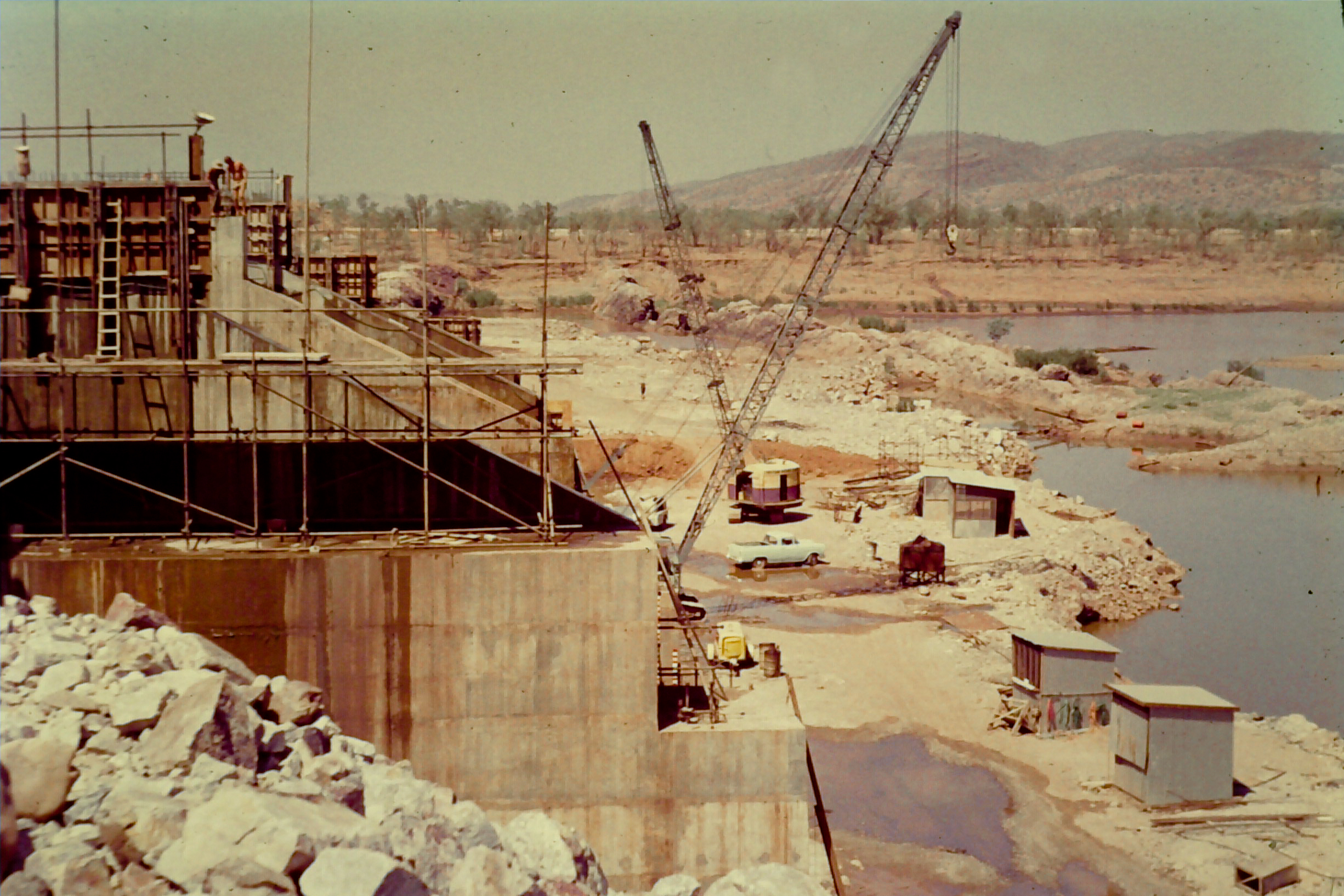
Construction of the Ord river diversion dam

The history of the idea of agriculture on the Ord River dates from the 19th century. On the first pastoral lease map (held by WA State Records Office) for the area dated 1887, it shows the northern bank between Wyndham and Kununurra, near House Roof Hill was held as a "Concession for Sugar Cane Planting," although it was never taken up. The idea of tropical agriculture on the Ord was discussed much from the earliest dates, but the land remained under pastoral lease until 1960. Kununurra was built on land resumed from Ivanhoe Station pastoral lease before 1961, as the town for the Ord River Irrigation Area which started as the Ord River Project or Ord Scheme, with survey work starting in 1959. Lake Kununurra is the flooded section of the Ord River valley that was formerly known as Carlton Reach, which was at times a 10-kilometre-long (6.2 mi) waterhole held back by the natural rock barrier known as Bandicoot Bar. At this site in 1959 drilling and blasting marked the start of construction of the Ord River Diversion Dam, which is anchored down onto the Bandicoot Bar. This dam with twenty radial flood gates was almost completed when visited by Queen Elizabeth II and Prince Philip in March 1963, then later completed and officially opened by then Prime Minister, Robert Menzies on 20 July 1963 when he said that Kununurra and the Ord River Irrigation Area (ORIA) is "... the most exciting place in Australia".

As well as the town site some ORIA farmers live on their farms; however the initial idea of the Ord Scheme was for "closer settlement" to allow farmers the convenience of living in the town and since the start of the first Pilot Farm in 1960 most farmers in the valley had lived in the town. However, many people now live on their irrigation farms. Other agricultural and residential localities exist within a 50-kilometre (31 mi) radius of the town, including various Aboriginal Communities, Crossing Falls, the Riverfarm Road and Packsaddle farm areas, and the Frank Wise Institute of Tropical Agriculture, formerly known as the Kimberley Research Station (KRS). KRS started in 1945 from the original Carlton Reach Research Station, set up by Kimberley Michael Durack with help from his brother William Aiden Durack in 1941, and support from the WA Department of Agriculture and the WA Public Works Department, being the first serious attempt at tropical agriculture on the banks of the Ord River. It was also in 1941 that Russell Dumas inspected the Ord gorges for dam sites on behalf of the Public Works Department.

The scheme involved damming the Ord River by building the Ord River diversion dam so that the waters could be conserved and directed to irrigate about 750 square kilometres (290 sq mi) of land. By 1966, there were 31 farms on the Ord River plains. In 1968 the second stage of the scheme was started with the building of the Ord River Dam (or Ord River Main Dam), known locally as "Top Dam," which holds back the waters of Lake Argyle.

Flooding of the Ord River continued until completion of the Main Ord River Dam situated 55 kilometres (34 mi) upstream from Kununurra, which was started in 1968, and officially opened on 30 June 1972, with support from WA Premier John Tonkin, by then Prime Minister William McMahon, when he said "This marks the beginning of Ord Stage II (Two)." The Ord River Dam flooded the land of the Argyle Downs station, the home station of the pioneering Durack family, to form what has become known as Lake Argyle. Stone work from the original Argyle Downs homestead, was removed before Lake Argyle filled and was re-erected near the dam site to become the Argyle Downs Homestead Museum. The Museum had been run by Tourism WA but was taken on by the Kununurra Visitor Centre during 2010.

The second stage of the Ord Project still has not been fully developed but new work is underway. In May 2010, with major funding from the Federal Government, the extension of the main channel construction got underway under the Moonamang Joint Venture.

Kununurra post office opened on 1 September 1960.

== Etymology ==
The name Kununurra is derived from the English pronunciation of the word Goonoonoorrang (alternatively Gananoorrang) which in the Miriwoong language means 'river'. It is a widespread myth that it means '(Meeting of) Big Waters' or 'Big River'. One also finds accounts of the name of Kununurra which state that it was the Miriwoong name for this part of the Ord River, which makes sense in that the Ord River runs for hundreds of kilometres coming from the south near Hall's Creek. It is stated to be likely that other parts of the Ord River were known by other Aboriginal language names, by the various tribal language group areas, over which the river traverses.

A 1943 soil classification had named the volcanic clay known locally as "blacksoil", being the predominant soil type of the irrigation area, as "Cununurra Clay" and "Cununurra" was put forward as a possible name, among others in 1960. The General Post Office (GPO) representative from WA on the Nomenclature Committee, objected saying that Cununurra was too close in name to the town of Cunnamulla and that could cause postal confusion. A compromise was reached and "K" was used with an argument having been put forward that this would bring it into line with other East Kimberley placenames, such as Kalumburu, and Karunjie. The name was only finally decided just days before the newest town of the Kimberley region, being gazetted on 10 February 1961.

== Population ==
Kununurra has a transient population. If itinerant residents, the outlying farm areas and small communities were included in census population figures, it is estimated numbers would have exceeded 7,000 for 2006, as opposed to the actual figure of 5,619.

According to the 2021 census of Population, there were 5,494 people in Kununurra.

- Aboriginal and Torres Strait Islander people made up 24.9% of the population.
- 67.1% of people were born in Australia. The next most common countries of birth were England 3.2% and New Zealand 1.6%%.
- 70% of people spoke only English at home. Other languages spoken at home included Miriwoong 2.2%.
- The most common responses for religion were No Religion 44.3% and Catholic 14.7%.

== Geography ==
The landscape surrounding Kununurra includes features such as Valentine Spring, Black Rock Creek and Middle Springs along with many other waterfalls and swimming holes. Popular fishing spots include Ivanhoe Crossing, The Diversion Dam, Buttons Crossing, and various locations along the Dunham and Ord Rivers.

The town is located close to the confluence of the Ord and the Dunham River. Lake Argyle, Australia's largest artificial lake, over 100 square kilometres (39 sq mi) in size, is 72 kilometres (45 mi) by road from the town, being held back by the main Ord River Dam.

The town lies within the Ord Irrigation Area Important Bird Area (IBA), so identified by BirdLife International because of its importance for wild birds, especially estrildid finches.

=== Climate ===
Like other areas in the tropics of Western Australia, Kununurra experiences a semi-arid climate (Köppen climate classification BSh) with distinct wet and dry seasons; it borders closely on the tropical savanna climate (Aw). The average annual rainfall is around 800 millimetres (31 in).

The dry season from April to September is the most popular time to visit: heat and humidity are lower, and road and park accessibility at their best. In the town's 53 years of weather records, rainfall of over 5 millimetres (0.20 in) has never been recorded in August, with most Augusts being completely rainless.

The build-up season from October to December is characterised by high heat and humidity. The oppressive conditions of the build-up often give way to spectacular electrical storms, along with dramatic lightning displays over the rugged Kimberley landscape. Such storms however bring little rain, and the lightning will often start bushfires in the surrounding scrub.

The summer monsoon period between January and March often causes accessibility issues, and the closure of many roads and national parks, due to heavy rain. Days are overcast and hot; heavy downpours are a frequent occurrence.

Climate data for Kununurra (1965–1986)
Month	Jan	Feb	Mar	Apr	May	Jun	Jul	Aug	Sep	Oct	Nov	Dec	Year
Record high °C (°F)	43.9 (111.0)	42.2 (108.0)	40.5 (104.9)	39.5 (103.1)	38.0 (100.4)	36.7 (98.1)	36.4 (97.5)	39.4 (102.9)	41.0 (105.8)	43.6 (110.5)	45.1 (113.2)	44.6 (112.3)	45.1 (113.2)
Mean maximum °C (°F)	40.8 (105.4)	39.8 (103.6)	38.7 (101.7)	38.2 (100.8)	36.3 (97.3)	34.4 (93.9)	34.4 (93.9)	37.2 (99.0)	39.4 (102.9)	41.3 (106.3)	42.2 (108.0)	41.8 (107.2)	43.0 (109.4)
Mean daily maximum °C (°F)	36.4 (97.5)	35.5 (95.9)	35.4 (95.7)	35.5 (95.9)	32.9 (91.2)	30.5 (86.9)	30.3 (86.5)	33.6 (92.5)	36.4 (97.5)	38.3 (100.9)	38.8 (101.8)	38.0 (100.4)	35.1 (95.2)
Daily mean °C (°F)	30.8 (87.4)	30.2 (86.4)	29.8 (85.6)	28.5 (83.3)	26.0 (78.8)	23.2 (73.8)	22.7 (72.9)	25.5 (77.9)	28.6 (83.5)	31.0 (87.8)	32.1 (89.8)	31.9 (89.4)	28.4 (83.1)
Mean daily minimum °C (°F)	25.2 (77.4)	24.9 (76.8)	24.1 (75.4)	21.4 (70.5)	19.1 (66.4)	15.9 (60.6)	15.0 (59.0)	17.4 (63.3)	20.8 (69.4)	23.7 (74.7)	25.4 (77.7)	25.7 (78.3)	21.6 (70.9)
Mean minimum °C (°F)	21.8 (71.2)	22.1 (71.8)	20.2 (68.4)	16.1 (61.0)	13.6 (56.5)	10.6 (51.1)	9.2 (48.6)	11.5 (52.7)	15.4 (59.7)	18.2 (64.8)	20.6 (69.1)	21.4 (70.5)	8.7 (47.7)
Record low °C (°F)	19.6 (67.3)	19.0 (66.2)	16.1 (61.0)	12.2 (54.0)	9.6 (49.3)	7.7 (45.9)	4.8 (40.6)	9.2 (48.6)	10.6 (51.1)	15.0 (59.0)	17.2 (63.0)	19.1 (66.4)	4.8 (40.6)
Average rainfall mm (inches)	196.6 (7.74)	213.0 (8.39)	136.2 (5.36)	21.2 (0.83)	10.0 (0.39)	3.9 (0.15)	1.3 (0.05)	0.0 (0.0)	2.8 (0.11)	25.5 (1.00)	70.9 (2.79)	105.3 (4.15)	786.7 (30.96)
Average rainy days (≥ 0.2mm)	14.8	14.8	10.2	2.5	1.0	0.2	0.2	0.0	0.6	3.5	6.8	10.4	65
Average relative humidity (%)	60	65	57	40	35	33	30	31	31	37	43	51	43

Climate data for Kununurra Aero (1991–2020, extremes 1986–present)
Month	Jan	Feb	Mar	Apr	May	Jun	Jul	Aug	Sep	Oct	Nov	Dec	Year
Record high °C (°F)	43.1 (109.6)	41.7 (107.1)	43.0 (109.4)	40.4 (104.7)	38.5 (101.3)	37.4 (99.3)	37.0 (98.6)	40.2 (104.4)	41.3 (106.3)	44.0 (111.2)	45.1 (113.2)	45.3 (113.5)	45.3 (113.5)
Mean daily maximum °C (°F)	35.9 (96.6)	35.2 (95.4)	35.8 (96.4)	35.5 (95.9)	33.0 (91.4)	30.5 (86.9)	30.8 (87.4)	32.8 (91.0)	36.8 (98.2)	38.8 (101.8)	39.1 (102.4)	37.3 (99.1)	35.1 (95.2)
Daily mean °C (°F)	30.5 (86.9)	30.0 (86.0)	30.0 (86.0)	28.7 (83.7)	25.8 (78.4)	23.1 (73.6)	22.9 (73.2)	24.2 (75.6)	28.3 (82.9)	31.1 (88.0)	32.2 (90.0)	31.4 (88.5)	28.2 (82.7)
Mean daily minimum °C (°F)	25.1 (77.2)	24.7 (76.5)	24.2 (75.6)	21.8 (71.2)	18.6 (65.5)	15.7 (60.3)	14.9 (58.8)	15.5 (59.9)	19.8 (67.6)	23.4 (74.1)	25.2 (77.4)	25.5 (77.9)	21.2 (70.2)
Record low °C (°F)	18.8 (65.8)	19.5 (67.1)	16.1 (61.0)	11.9 (53.4)	8.6 (47.5)	6.7 (44.1)	6.0 (42.8)	6.1 (43.0)	9.3 (48.7)	13.9 (57.0)	16.3 (61.3)	19.0 (66.2)	6.0 (42.8)
Average rainfall mm (inches)	209.2 (8.24)	216.0 (8.50)	143.3 (5.64)	29.5 (1.16)	6.8 (0.27)	3.0 (0.12)	1.4 (0.06)	0.1 (0.00)	5.2 (0.20)	23.4 (0.92)	58.5 (2.30)	142.6 (5.61)	839 (33.02)
Average rainy days	15.7	15.0	11.0	3.0	1.2	0.5	0.3	0.1	0.7	3.8	7.2	12.3	70.8
Average relative humidity (%)	60	64	52	37	30	28	24	23	29	32	40	53	39
Average dew point °C (°F)	21.8 (71.2)	22.4 (72.3)	19.1 (66.4)	12.6 (54.7)	6.9 (44.4)	3.6 (38.5)	1.3 (34.3)	1.7 (35.1)	8.5 (47.3)	12.4 (54.3)	16.9 (62.4)	20.6 (69.1)	12.3 (54.2)

== Agriculture ==
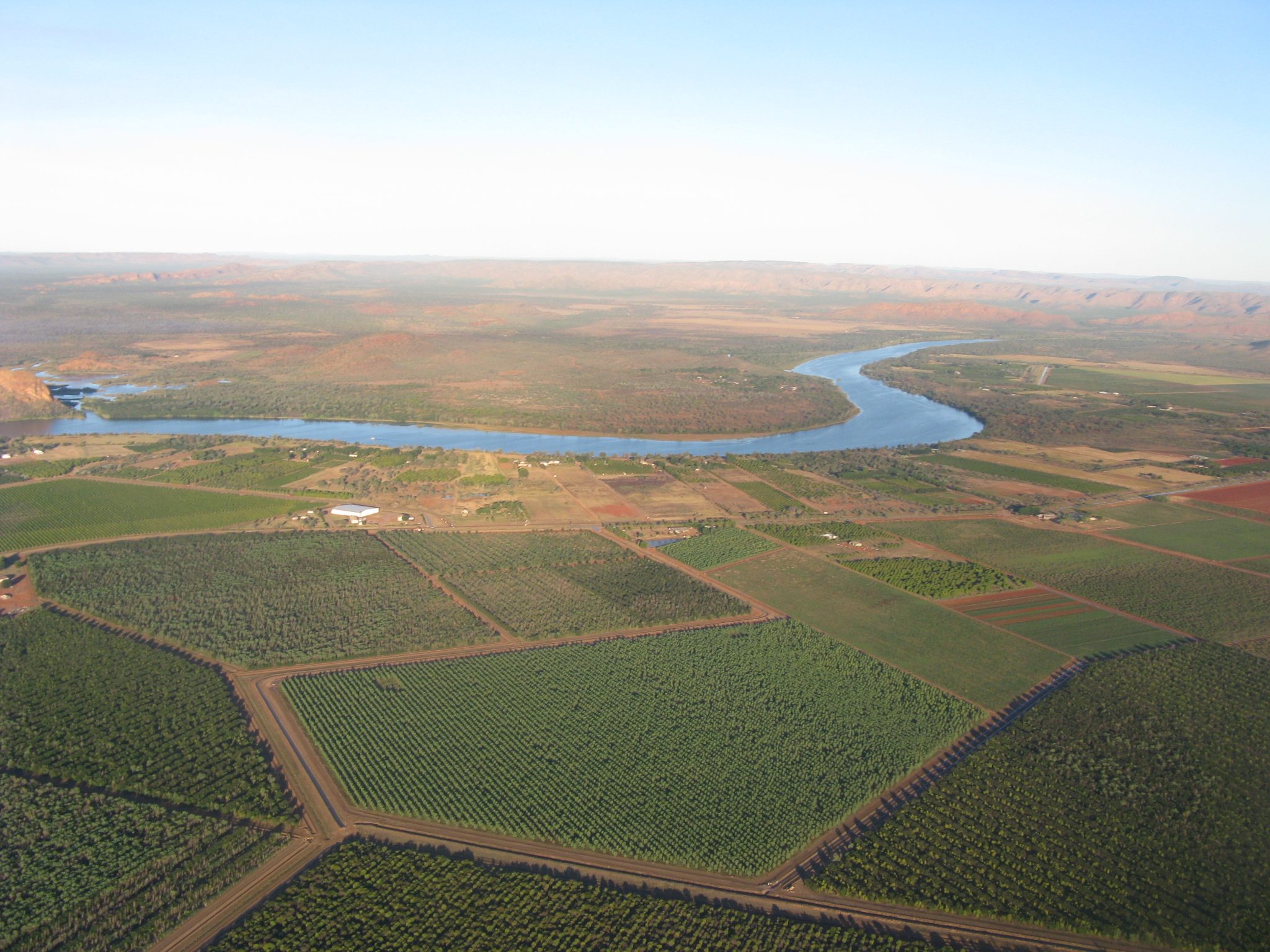
Indian Sandalwood plantations at Kununurra

Key farm activities include the growing of melons, mangoes and until recently, sugar cane. Farmers are now turning to a more lucrative (though longer term) crop of Indian sandalwood. Other crops that have been grown in the Ord are cotton, safflower and rice, which is being trialled once again, having been the first crop planted on the Pilot Farm in 1960. The town has a melon picking season, which attracts migratory farm workers to the area. There is also a thriving tourism industry with most tourist operators capitalising on the scenery of the Ord River, Lake Argyle, Diversion Dam and other local locations, including the relatively nearby Bungle Bungle Range.

== Media ==
Since 1980 Kununurra has been the base of the Kimberley Echo founded by the late James O'Kenny and Brian Cole. Radio stations that broadcast to Kununurra are ABC Kimberley on 819 AM and 6WR Waringarri Radio broadcasts across the Kimberley area from Kununurra on 693 AM, 101.1 FM, 101.3 FM, 102.1 FM, and 104.3 FM. 6WR Waringarri Radio also streams live online, and is available via the 'VAST' service to remote and blackspot areas of Australia on the Optus C1 satellite. Reach Beyond Australia broadcasts via shortwave from Kununurra between 9.7 and 15.3 MHz with evening releases in English and many Asian languages. Television stations are available in Kununurra and in the Kimberley region are ABC, SBS, Seven Regional WA, WIN's Nine Regional WA and Network 10 affiliate West Digital Television.

== Culture, recreation, and tourism ==
The town has many local attractions, including waterfalls, gorges, and ranges.

=== Jirrawun Arts ===
Jirrawun Arts was an Indigenous Australian art centre, established in 1998 in Kununurra before moving to Wyndham in 2006. It was notable as the base for contemporary Indigenous Australian artists of the eastern Kimberley region, including Paddy Bedford and Freddie Timms. It closed in 2010. Their art was exhibited in exhibitions in Melbourne and elsewhere.

=== Waringarri Aboriginal Arts ===
Waringarri Aboriginal Arts is an Aboriginal art centre that celebrates the art and culture of the Miriwoong people. It was established in the 1980s, and became the first wholly Indigenous-owned art centre in Western Australia. It is also one of the oldest continuously operating art centres in Australia. The centre was refurbished in 2011.

Within the centre, there are artists' studios and galleries, in which artworks are for sale, and cultural tours and performances are available for visitors. These activities help to provide economic independence for artists and their community. Waringarri supports over 100 artists, including painters, printmakers, wood carvers, boab engravers, sculptors, and textile artists.

== Transport ==
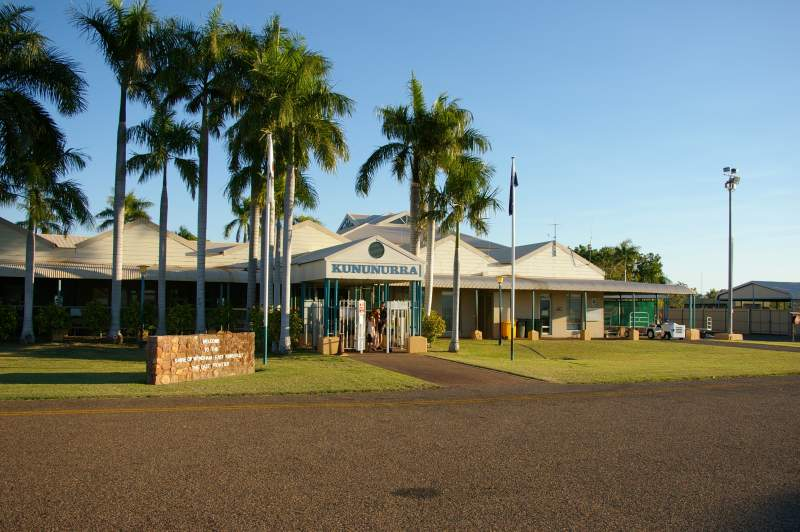
Old airport terminal

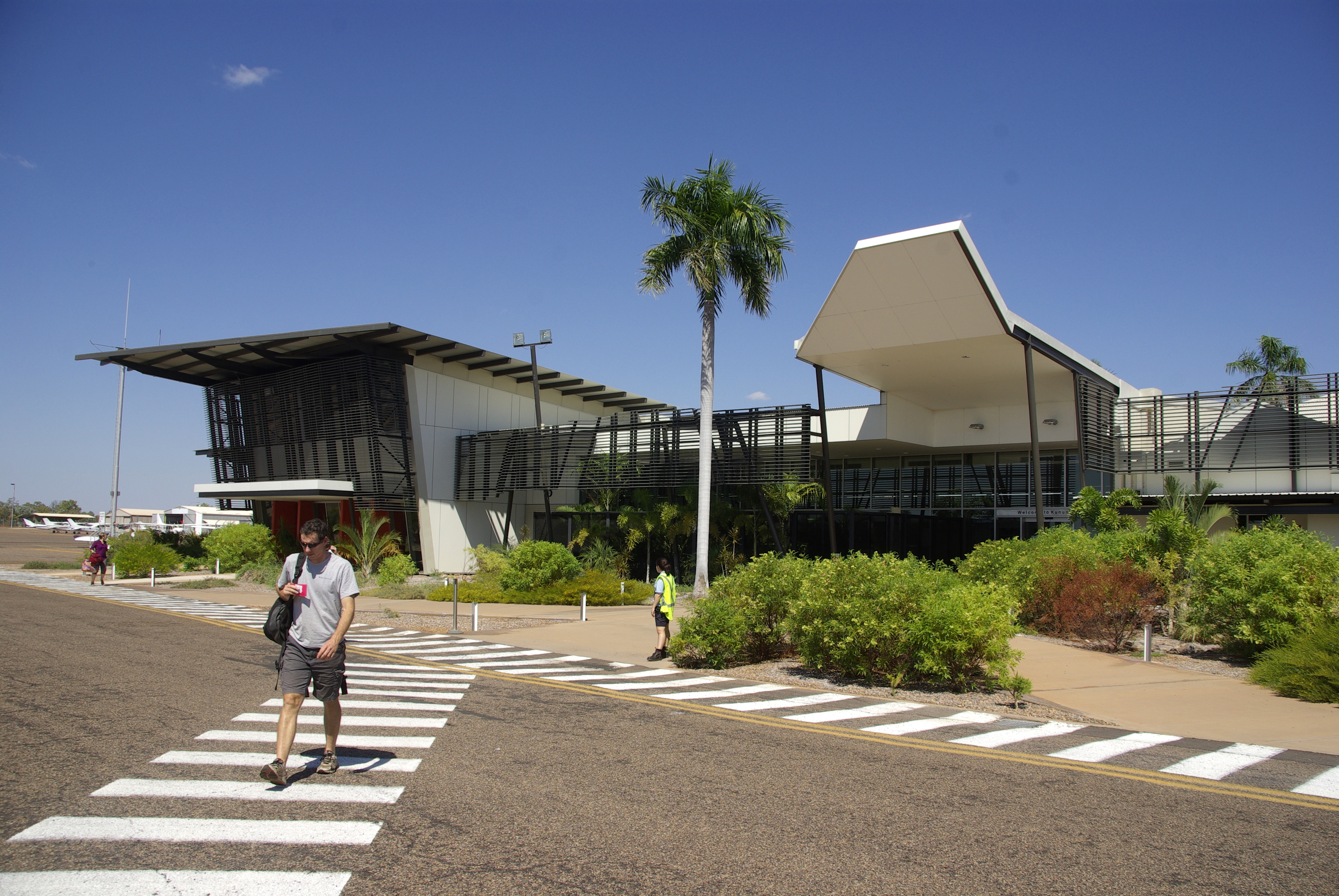
East Kimberley Regional Airport

East Kimberley Regional Airport, commonly referred to as Kununurra Airport, is located 3.7 km (2.3 mi) west of the town centre. Heavy wet seasons often result in this area being cut off from essential outside services and deliveries. The airport is a crucial piece of infrastructure which enables people and goods to enter or leave from the region and especially supports tourism and economic development.

== Facilities ==
=== Legal ===
The Kununurra Courthouse, which includes a magistrate and a jury courtroom, was opened on 26 October 2014. It was designed by TAG Architects and Iredale Pedersen Hook Architects. The paintings of the Aboriginal artists from Miriwoong country were included in the design of the building.

=== Education ===
East Kimberley College has a student population of just over 900 ranging from kindergarten to year 12. St Joseph's Primary School and Ngalangangpum School are two Catholic schools. There is limited tertiary education available via a Western Australia North Regional Technical and further education (TAFE) campus.

=== Health ===
Kununurra District Hospital houses 32 beds and a 10-bed aged care facility. There are dental practices in the town.

=== Community ===
The Kununurra Leisure Centre is a multi-purpose, community recreation facility catering for a wide range of sports, recreation activities and social functions. It includes a 25-metre (82 ft) pool.

Kununurra Neighbourhood House is a not-for-profit community centre that provides various services and activities for the residents of Kununurra. Some of the services offered by Kununurra Neighbourhood House include family support, playgroups, parenting programs, emergency relief, referrals and advocacy. The centre also hosts events such as markets, workshops, festivals and fundraisers. Kununurra Neighbourhood House is open to the community between 8 am and 1 pm Monday to Friday.

Kununurra Youth Hub is run by Police Citizens Youth Club (PCYC) to the community between 8 am and 5 pm daily.

== In popular culture ==
Kununurra has a Celebrity Tree Park with many trees planted by famous people such as Baz Luhrmann who shot most his 2008 film Australia just outside Kununurra.

Nicole Kidman thought that the area's water helped her get pregnant while filming Australia in this town, stating "seven babies were conceived out of this film and only one was a boy. There is something up there in the Kununurra water because we all went swimming in the waterfalls, so we can call it the fertility waters now."

The entertainer Rolf Harris planted a Cathormion umbellatum tree in the Celebrity Tree Park in 1986. The plaque recording the planting was stolen in July 2014, after he was convicted in England in June 2014 of the sexual assault of four underage girls, which effectively ended his career. A week later, the local council voted to keep it. The council, however, felt that ongoing vandalism at the park made it unlikely that the plaque would be replaced.

It was voted the second best town to live in Australia for outdoor adventure by Outdoor Australia magazine in the March/April 2007 edition.

== See also ==
- Argyle diamond mine
- El Questro Wilderness Park
