= Ruddick =

Ruddick is a surname. Notable people with the surname include:

- George Ruddick (1881–1949), Welsh rugby union and rugby league footballer
- Maurice Ruddick (1912–1988), Afro-Canadian miner and a survivor of the 1958 Springhill Mining Disaster
- Robert C. Ruddick (1861–1921), Canadian politician
- Sara Ruddick (1935–2011), feminist philosopher and author

== Variants ==
- Reddick (disambiguation)
- Riddick (disambiguation)
- Roddick (disambiguation)
- Ruddock (surname)
