= Ruddock (surname) =

Ruddock is a surname. Notable people with the surname include:

- Anne-Marie Ruddock, British pop singer, best known for being the lead vocalist with Amazulu
- Donovan Ruddock, boxer
- Joan Ruddock, Welsh politician
- Margot Ruddock, actress and poet
- Mary Ruddock, (1895–1969), New Zealand businesswoman
- Mike Ruddock, Welsh rugby player and coach
- Neil Ruddock, English football player
- Osbourne Ruddock, Jamaican sound engineer known as King Tubby
- Paul Ruddock, chair of the Victoria and Albert Museum
- Philip Ruddock, Australian politician

== See also ==
- Reddick (disambiguation)
- Riddick (disambiguation)
- Roddick (disambiguation)
- Ruddick
