= Tommy McRae =

Aboriginal artist

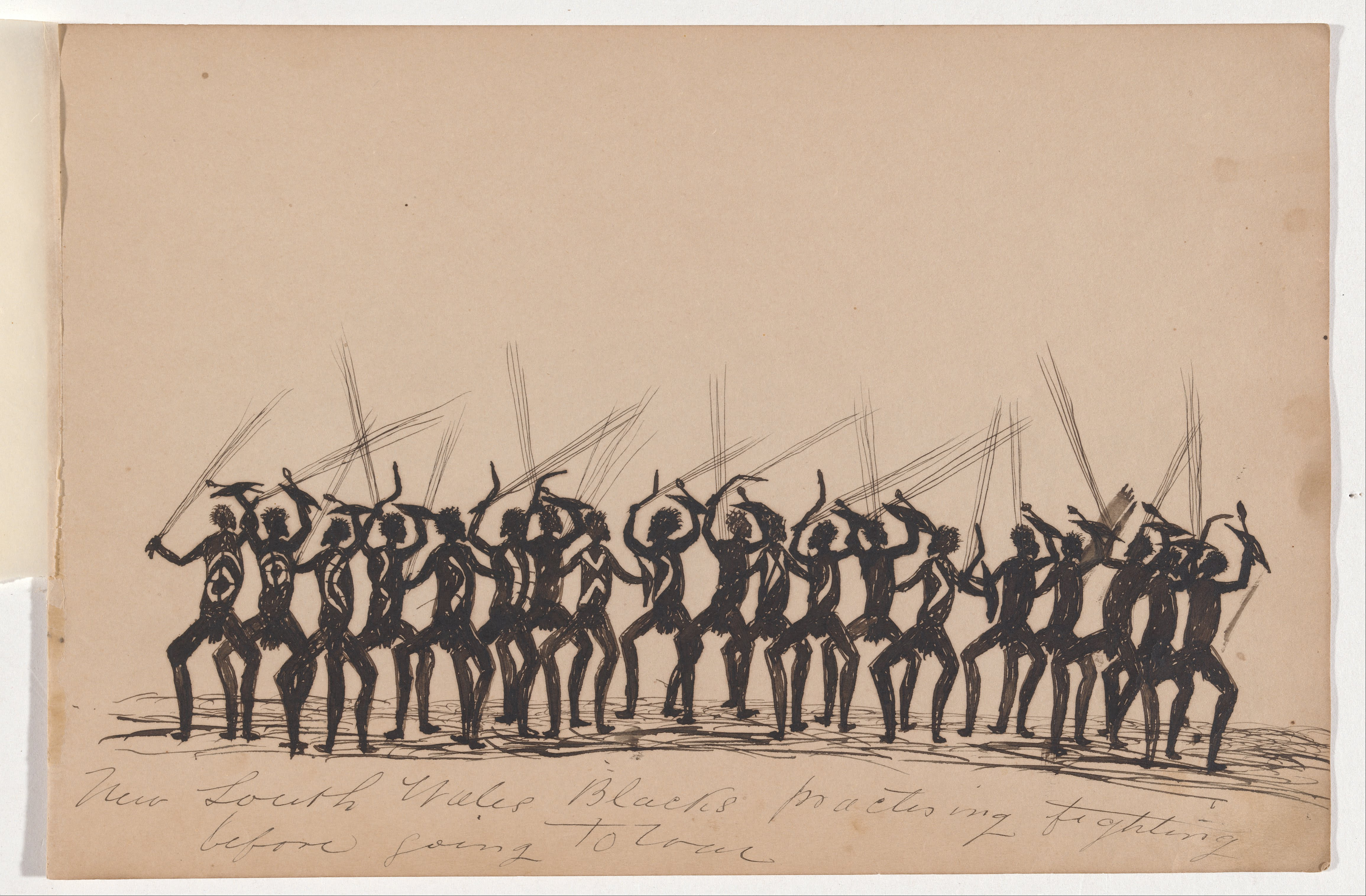
Tommy McRae, New South Wales Blacks practising fighting before going to war, c.1890s

Tommy McRae (c.1835–1901) was an Aboriginal artist who lived in the Upper Murray district of Australia.

== Early life ==
McRae was a Wahgunyah man whose country stretched from south of the Murray River to near the junction of the Goulburn and Murray rivers in Victoria. His first language was Bangerang.

== Background ==
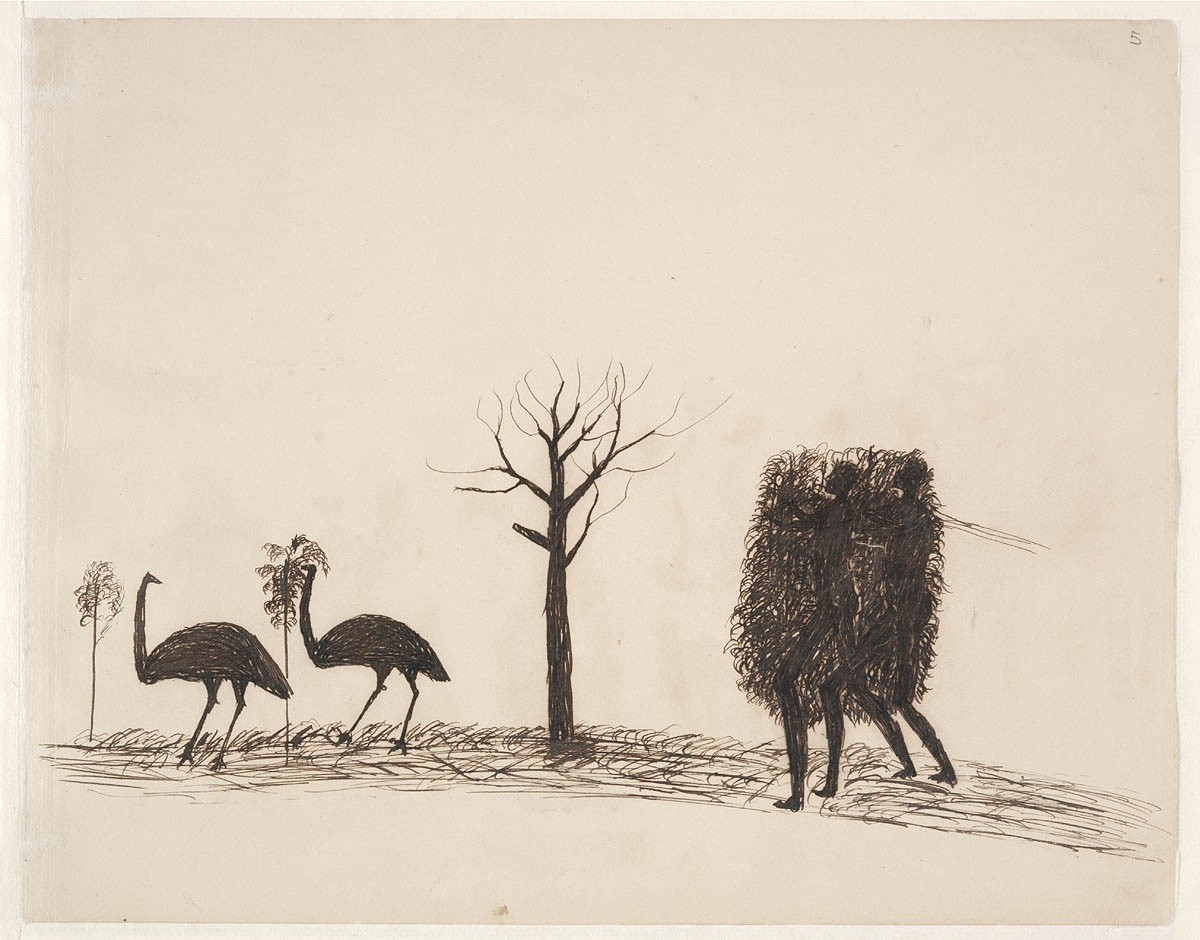
Stalking emu, ca. 1885, attributed to Tommy McRae

McRae recorded the establishment of pastoral settler society in his country while he was a labourer on pastoral stations in northern Victoria. He is believed to have been a stockman for Andrew Hume (nephew of explorer Hamilton Hume) of Brocklesby station at Corowa, New South Wales, between 1849 and 1857 and in around 1865 was at David Reid's station on the Upper Murray' and previously at Barnawartha where McRae's first drawings were collected between 1861 and 1864 by sculptor Theresa Walker (Mrs. G.H. Poole) under the name "Tommy Barnes". McRae possibly adopted an employer's name, Wodonga pastoralist David Barnes. He also went by the names of Yackaduna and Warraeuea.

Producing and selling books of drawings, several of them were purchased from McRae by travellers. These contained illustrations of traditional Aboriginal life, including ceremonies, hunting and fishing, with individuals and animals predominantly silhouetted in landscapes of sparse trees and earth. The subjects included squatters and Chinese and William Buckley, who had lived for 30 years with the Wathaurung.

McRae's work was included in the first edition of K. Langloh Parker's Australian Legendary Tales (1896), from original drawings sent to the editor Andrew Lang by his brother in Corowa. The artist was uncredited in the work, but the correct attribution was discovered when later investigation of Lang's papers found an inscription with the original drawings.

== Patronage ==
In the 1860s McRae settled on the shores of Lake Moodemere at Wahgunyah, Victoria where Roderick Kilborn, a Canadian vigneron and telegraph-master, became a patron and protector for the artist in the early 1880s. By 1885 he had a wife (Lily) and four children, while his brother and sister-in-law were also living at Lake Moodemere. Between 1890 and 1897, McRae's children were taken from him sent to reserves under Victorian government regulations, despite efforts by Kilborn to prevent this.

McRae died on 15 October 1901 and was buried in the Carlyle cemetery at Wahgunyah. His drawings are held by the National Museum of Australia the National Gallery of Australia, National Library of Australia Canberra, the State library Victoria, State Library of New South Wales and Melbourne Museum.

== More reading ==
- A. Sayers, Aboriginal Artists of the Nineteenth Century (Melb, 1994)
- Aboriginal History, vol 5, no 1, June 1981, p 80
- Corowa Free Press, 14 May 1886, p 4, 25 Oct 1901, p 3
- Argus Camera Supplement, 8 June 1929, p 4.
