= Horrie Miller (aviator) =

Australian aviator (1893–1980)

Horrie Miller OBE
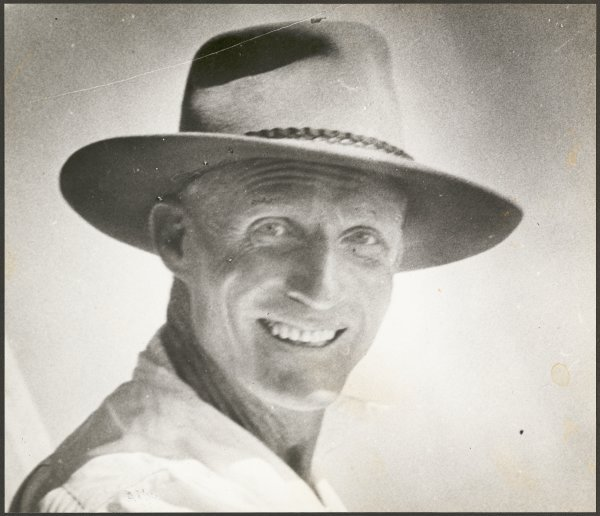
- Born: Horace Clive Miller; 30 April 1893; Ballarat, Victoria, Australia
- Died: 27 September 1980 (aged 87); Dalkeith, Western Australia
- Occupation: Pilot
- Spouse: Dame Mary Durack (m. 1938)
- Children: Robin Miller
- Awards: Oswald Watt Gold Medal (1977)

Horace Clive Miller (30 April 1893 – 27 September 1980) was a pioneering Australian aviator and co-founder of MacRobertson Miller Airlines.

== Early life ==
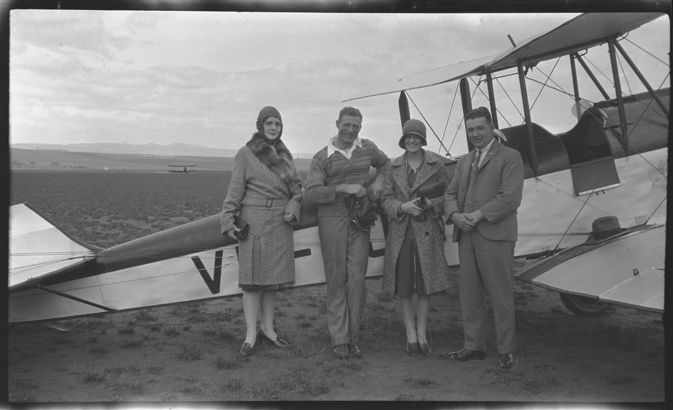
Miller and friends with DH 60 Gipsy moth VH-UJX. Miller is 2nd from left

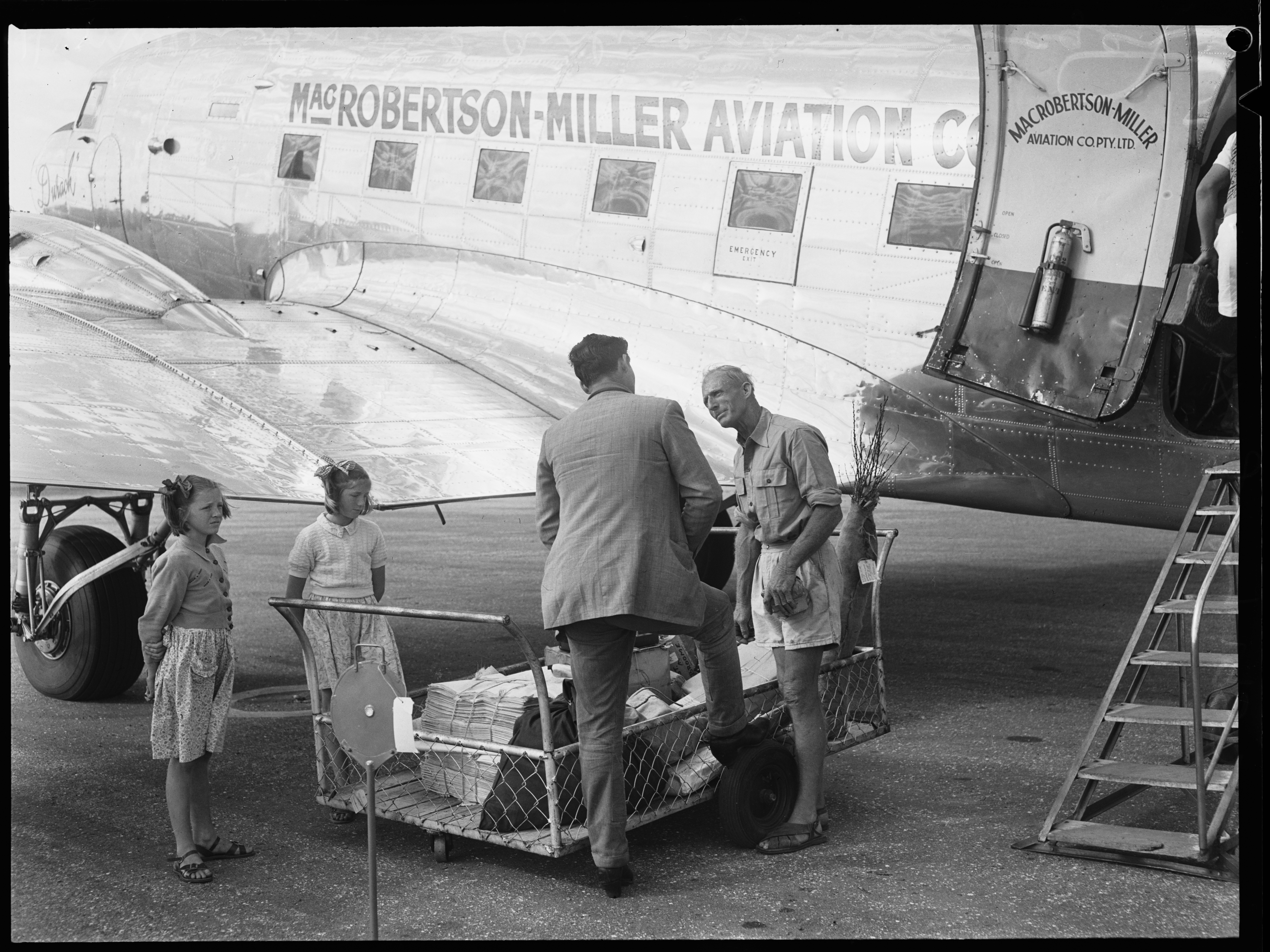
Horace Miller, Miller Airlines, Broome, Western Australia, 1952

Miller was born on 30 April 1893 in Ballarat, Victoria. He was the younger of two children born to Mary Ann (née Hurley) and John Pettigrew Miller.

Miller's Irish-born mother died of typhoid when he was an infant. He and his older sister were raised by their father, a clerk. He left school at a young age and moved to Melbourne, working various menial jobs before joining the Sunshine Harvester Works as an apprentice. During this time he became interested in aviation and built his first model aircraft.

== Aviation career ==
After completing his apprenticeship at Sunshine, Miller joined the Tarrant Motor Company where he became acquainted with fellow aviation pioneers Harry Hawker, Harry Kauper, and Harry Busteed. In 1913 he followed the "three Harrys" to England where they had begun working for the Sopwith Aviation Company. He learned to fly there and "won repute for his knowledge of aerodynamics".

He flew in the 1929 Western Australian Centenary Air Race, winning handicap honours.

== Personal life ==
In 1934, Miller married Jean Auburn Knox, with whom he had one daughter. They divorced in 1938 and in the same year he married burgeoning novelist Mary Durack, the daughter of Western Australian pastoralist Michael Durack. The couple had four daughters and two sons, including Robin Miller Dicks who followed her father into aviation.

Miller suffered a stroke in 1977 and died on 27 September 1980 in Dalkeith, Western Australia, aged 87. His ashes were interred at Broome cemetery.

A major road in Perth Airport is named Horrie Miller Drive in honour of the aviator. It formerly served as the main access route to Perth Airport's terminals 1 and 2.
