= Reddick (surname) =

Reddick is a surname. Notable people with the surname include:

- Alzo Reddick (born 1937), American politician
- Anthony Reddick (born 1985), American football player who played in Canadian Football League
- Cat Reddick (born 1982), American soccer player
- David Reddick (born 1971), American artist, illustrator and cartoonist
- DeWitt Carter Reddick (1904–1980), American journalist and professor
- Eunice S. Reddick (born 1951), American diplomat
- Haason Reddick (born 1994), American football player
- Jaret Reddick (born 1972), lead vocalist / rhythm guitarist for rock band Bowling for Soup
- Jeffrey Reddick (born 1969), American screenwriter
- John B. Reddick (1845–1898), American politician
- Josh Reddick (born 1987), American baseball player
- Julie Reddick (born 1983), Canadian curler
- Kevin Reddick (born 1989), American football player
- Lance Reddick (1962–2023), American actor and musician
- Lawrence D. Reddick (1910–1995), American historian
- Mariah Reddick (1832–1922), American slave and midwife
- Paul Reddick, Canadian singer-songwriter and musician
- Percy Reddick (1896–1978), Archdeacon of Bristol
- Pokey Reddick (born 1964), Canadian ice hockey goaltender
- Stan Reddick (born 1969), Canadian ice hockey goaltender
- Tom Reddick (1912–1982), English cricketer
- Troy Reddick (born 1983), American football player
- Tyler Reddick (born 1996), American race car driver
- William Reddick (politician) (1812–1885), American politician
- William H. Reddick (1840–1903), American soldier, Congressional Medal of Honor recipient

== See also ==
- Reddick (disambiguation)
- Redick (surname)
- Readick
- Riddick (disambiguation)
