= Elizabeth Durack =

Australian artist (1915–2000)

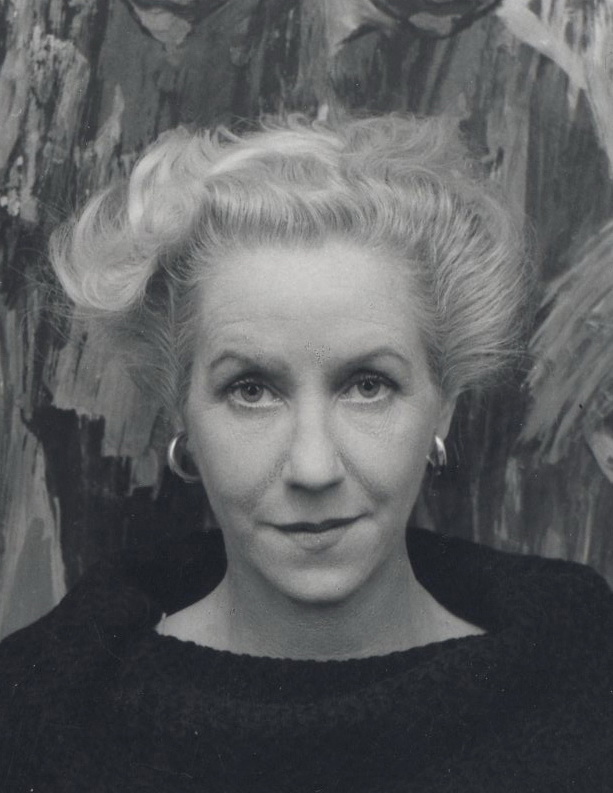
- Durack in 1961
- Born: 6 July 1915; Perth, Western Australia
- Died: 25 May 2000 (aged 84); Perth, Western Australia
- Known for: Painting

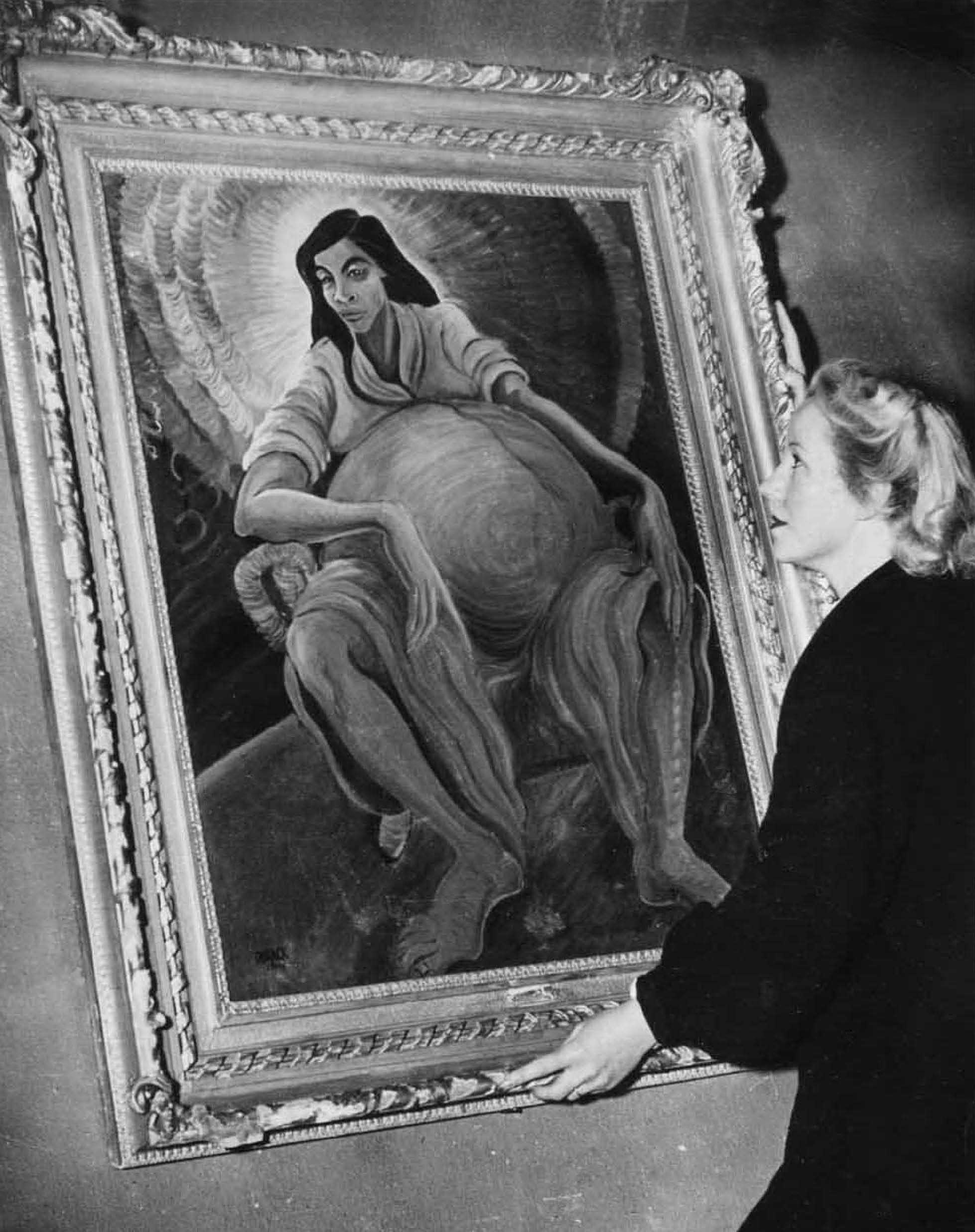
Elizabeth Durack with Broome Madonna, from the series Time and Tide at the Athenaeum Gallery, Melbourne, 1946

Elizabeth Durack Clancy CMG, OBE (6 July 1915 – 25 May 2000) was a Western Australian artist and writer.

== Early life ==
Born in the Perth suburb of Claremont on 6 July 1915, she was a daughter of Kimberley pioneer, Michael Patrick Durack (1865–1950) and his wife, Bessie Johnstone Durack. She was the younger sister of writer and historian Dame Mary Durack (1913–1994). The sisters were educated at the Loreto Convent in Perth, and also on the Kimberley cattle stations, Argyle Downs and Ivanhoe. It was there that they established unique and enduring relationships with the Mirriuwong-Gajerrong people of the Ord River region. In 1936–37 the sisters travelled to Europe where Elizabeth studied at the Chelsea Polytechnic, London.

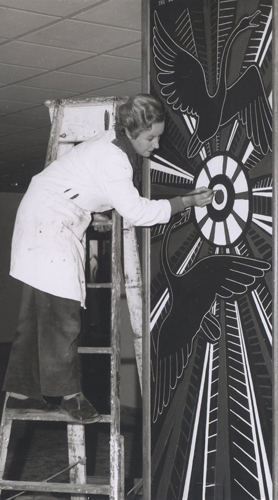
At work on The New Plumage, Black Swan mural, Sir Charles Gairdner Hospital, Nedlands, Perth, 1956

== Art ==
Her work was notable for the way it combined and reflected both western and aboriginal perceptions of the world. Based for much of her life in remote parts of north and central Western Australia, far from the metropolitan centres of mainstream artistic activity, Durack received stimulus and inspiration from sources quite different from those of her contemporaries, e.g. William Dobell, Arthur Boyd, Albert Tucker, et al. Separated by both geography and gender, her talent emerged "... original, versatile and persistent, a xerophytic adaptation, almost, to a particularly harsh environment".

August 1946 saw her first exhibition in Perth. In 1951 she had a joint exhibition with the potter Eileen Constance Keys. They put their work together in still-life arrangements inspired by Georges Braque. July 2000 was the last exhibition she planned. It was held posthumously in London, Elizabeth Durack held 65 solo exhibitions and participated in many group shows. Over that time her art evolved from simple line drawings, through part-abstract metaphorical works, to the transcendent masterworks of her last creative phase.

Durack's work included a number of dyeline prints, hand coloured in watercolour, depicting life on a Kimberley cattle station (Ivanhoe and Lissadell pastoral stations). Aboriginal women and children feature in these pictures, four of which can be seen at the National Museum of Australia.

In the beginning . . . (Genesis 1) 1997, mixed media on linen, diptych, each 190x92

Illustrations

Some of Elizabeth Durack's earliest published illustrations are of aboriginal life in Western Australia, for example her illustrations for the 1935 book "All-About: The Story of a Black Community on Argyle Station, Kimberley". "Elizabeth Durack is credited with illustrating the book Who rides the river? by JK Ewers, released in 1956. Illustrations were provided by Durack for a new edition of Australian Legendary Tales in 1953, Aboriginal tales edited and selected by Henrietta Drake-Brockman from those collected and translated by K. Langloh Parker. This edition was chosen by the Children's Book Council of Australia as "Book of the Year" for 1954.

She and her sister also made a comic strip, Nungalla and Jungalla in 1942–1943.

== Honours and awards ==
In recognition of services to art and literature, Elizabeth Durack was appointed an Officer of the Order of the British Empire (OBE) in 1966 and in 1982, a Companion of the Order of St Michael and St George (CMG). In 1994 and 1996 Murdoch University and the University of Western Australia conferred upon her Honorary Doctorates of Letters.

== Eddie Burrup controversy ==
In the 1990s, artworks by indigenous artist "Eddie Burrup" began to appear on the Aboriginal art scene. Paintings by 'Eddie Burrup' were first displayed in January 1995 in a mixed exhibition at Kimberley Fine Art—Durack Gallery, Broome, Western Australia. The gallery was run by Elizabeth's daughter, Perpetua Durack Clancy. In January 1996 Eddie Burrup was invited to participate in Native Titled Now, a 1996 Adelaide Festival of Arts Event presented by the Tandanya National Aboriginal Cultural Institute, March–April 1996. Later in the year works by Eddie Burrup were selected for the Telstra 13th National Aboriginal & Torres Strait Islander Art Award at the Museum and Art Gallery of the Northern Territory, Darwin, 17 August–19 October 1996. In 1997 Elizabeth Durack disclosed that Burrup was her pseudonym, an identity she considered her "alter ego". Controversy ensued, in part because her works had been included in Indigenous Australian art exhibitions.

Durack freely assumed the right to make Aboriginal art as Burrup. This was not appreciated by other Aboriginal artists nor the gallery owner who represented "Burrup". Durack continued to make art as Eddie Burrup until her death on 25 May 2000, aged 84. Responses from the art world and the public ranged widely. Some censured Elizabeth Durack and dismissed Burrup paintings that previously had been acclaimed. Three works by Eddie Burrup from Native Titled Now were removed from the walls of the Gippsland Art Gallery in Sale, Victoria. Members of the Aboriginal art community claimed that Durack had stolen indigenous culture and John Mundine, an Aboriginal art curator, remarked that "it's the last thing left that you could possibly take away other than our lives or shoot us all." Doreen Mellor, who had curated the Native Titled Now exhibition, stated that "as an Aboriginal person I feel really offended." Durack was bemused by the controversy, remarking "I'm just using a nom de plume. Why are people so interested in the fact of what I've done?"

== Legacy ==
The estate of Elizabeth Durack contains original material from the 1920s on through all decades up until the year 2000. The material consists principally of artworks, manuscripts, poetry and letters. During her lifetime Durack held many successful exhibitions but resisted selling certain key works that remain with the estate.

Since her death, executors have arranged exhibitions as follows:

- The Art of Eddie Burrup presented by the Rebecca Hossack Gallery, London in July 2000;
- Prelude – Early works by Elizabeth Durack 1947–50, a Travelling Exhibition, presented by Art on the Move, the National Exhibitions Touring Structure for Western Australia, in 2002–3
- an auction presented by McKenzies Auctioneers, Perth, May 2006;
- a sale of miscellaneous printed and original material, presented by Robert Muir Old and Rare Books, Perth, July 2006;
- paintings from the series, Battle Cries (1978) and Bett-Bett's wonderful lonely palace ... (1985) presented by Greenhill Galleries, Perth, May 2007
- With outstretched arms ... Kimberley Sisters of St John of God with children, patients and friends in postwar Broome, Derby, and Beagle Bay presented by Forty7ED at the Lingiari Foundation Centre at Broome, July 2007.

Durack was interviewed and featured on numerous radio and TV shows including 60 Minutes.

In 2016, a volume of selected writings reflecting her art and life was published, edited by Perpetua Durack Clancy.

== See also ==
- Mary Durack
- Michael Durack
