= Ruddock =

Ruddock may refer to:

- European robin (Erithacus rubecula), the classic robin bird
- Ruddock House
- Ruddock, Louisiana
- Ruddock (surname)
