= Reddick =

Reddick may refer to:

== Places ==
- Reddick, Florida, United States
- Reddick, Illinois, United States
- Reddick Nunatak, Antarctica

== Other uses ==
- Reddick (surname)

== See also ==
- Riddick (disambiguation)
- Readick (surname)
- Redick (surname)
