= St Margaret's College, Christchurch =

St Margaret's College

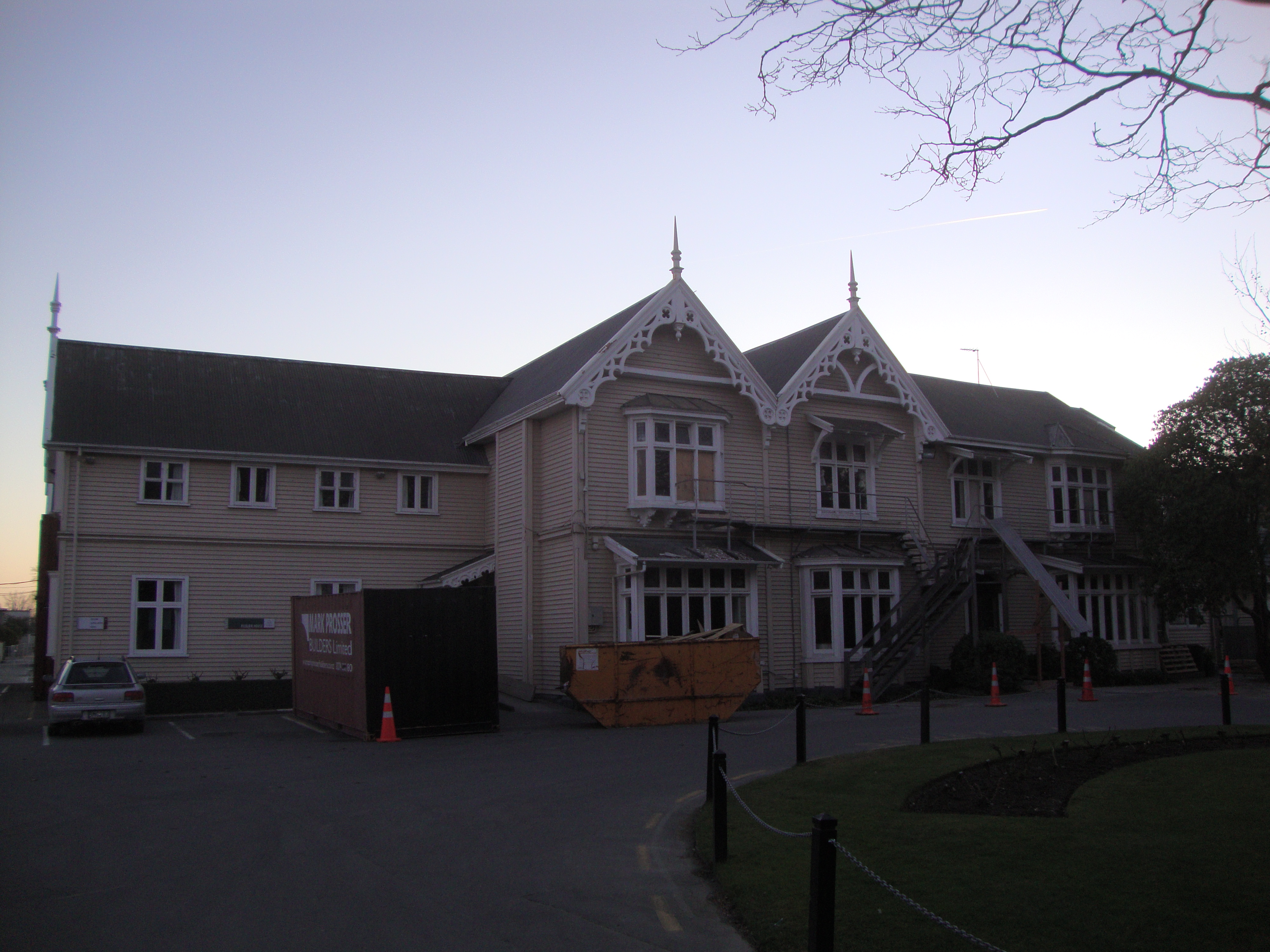
- Kilburn House at St Margaret's College

Location
- 12 Winchester Street, Merivale, Christchurch; 43.5177°S 172.6243°E

Information
- Type: Private: Fully Registered girls' school (Years 1–13) with boarding facilities
- Motto: Latin: Beati Mundo Corde (Blessed Are The Pure In Heart)
- Established: 1910
- Ministry of Education Institution no.: 333
- Chairperson: Di Humphries
- Executive Principal: Diana Patchett
- Chaplain: Rev'd Stephanie Clay
- Enrolment: 867 (July 2026)
- Socio-economic decile: 10
- Website: stmargarets.school.nz

St Margaret's College is an independent girls' school in Christchurch, New Zealand, founded on Anglican Christian values. It offers the dual academic pathway of NCEA and International Baccalaureate.

== History ==
The school was established in 1910 on the initiative of Bishop Julius of the Anglican Diocese of Christchurch, who invited the Kilburn, England-based Sisters of the Church Order to set up the school. The school was initially located in the Christchurch Central City south of Armagh Street, where it opened on 8 February 1910. In 1914, the school moved slightly north to Chester Street West off Cranmer Square, and that building is now part of the Cathedral Grammar School. St Margaret's opened a prep school on Papanui Road in the early 1920s, just north of the current school grounds. In the 1940s, the current grounds were occupied. On that site, the school had been using an 1880 homestead as a boarding house since 1922. In 1941, this building was renamed Kilburn House. In the 2011 Christchurch earthquake, Kilburn House was damaged. After NZ$2 million repairs, Kilburn House opened again in August 2012. The school received a commendation from the Christchurch Civic Trust for the renovation of this heritage building. This renovation was part of a significant rebuild project following the earthquakes when the school lost close to 90% of its buildings.

== St Margaret's College today ==
St Margaret's College is the only girls' school in the South Island of New Zealand to offer the International Baccalaureate Diploma in addition to NCEA.

It is divided into three schools:

- Junior School (Years 1–6)
- Middle School (Years 7–10)
- Senior School (Years 11–13)

Boarding (Years 7–13) St Margaret's College has over 90 years of boarding history. Currently 150 girls are in three boarding houses, arranged in year groups and structured to the specific needs of each developmental stage.

== Enrolment ==
As a private school, St Margaret's College charges tuition fees to cover costs. For the 2025 school year, tuition fees for New Zealand residents are $18,210 per year for students in years 1 to 3, $23,200 per year for students in years 4 to 6, $27,050 per year for students in years 7 and 8, and $30,420 per year for students in years 9 to 13. Boarding fees are an additional $18,795 per year.

As of July 2026, St Margaret's College has roll of 867 students, of which 62 (7.2%) identify as Māori. As a private school, the school is not assigned an Equity Index.

== Notable alumnae ==
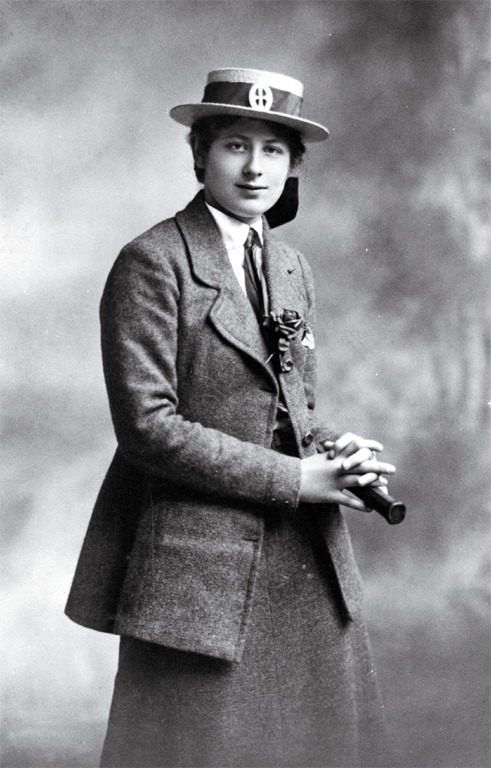
Ngaio Marsh, between 1910 and 1914

- Arihia Bennett – first female CEO of Te Rūnanga o Ngāi Tahu
- Marjorie Chambers (1906–1989) – senior nurse
- Natalia Zotov (born 1942), cosmologist specialising in gravity waves
- Peri Drysdale (born 1954) – founder of the Snowy Peak and Untouched World brands
- Ella Greenslade (born 1997) – rower
- Anna Harrison (born 1983) – former New Zealand netball international.
- Eileen Keys (1903–1992) – potter
- Olivia Loe (born 1992) – rower
- Ngaio Marsh (1895–1982) – writer
- Mary Ruddock (1895–1969) – fashion designer and businesswoman
- Amy Satterthwaite (born 1986) – White Ferns cricketer
- Julie Seymour (born 1971) – Silver Ferns captain
- Nicky Wagner (born 1953) – former MP

== See also ==
- List of schools in New Zealand
