= Martha Berkeley =

Australian artist (1813–1889)

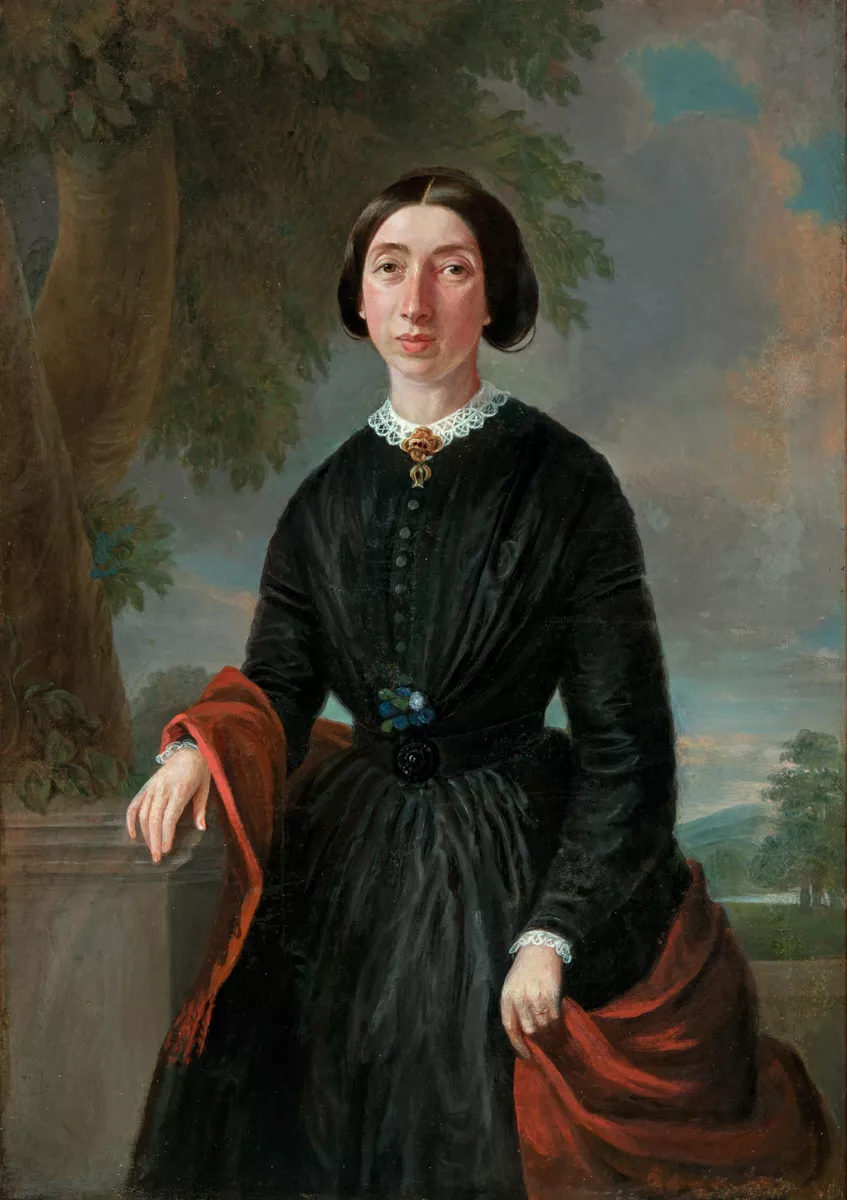
- Self-portrait, oil on medal, c.1849
- Born: 18 August 1813; Keynsham, England
- Died: 7 July 1899 (aged 85); Camberwell, Victoria, Australia
- Spouse: Captain Charles Berkeley

Martha Maria Snell Berkeley (18 August 1813 – 7 July 1899) was an Australian artist.

Born in Keynsham, England on 18 August 1813, she married Captain Charles Berkeley before migrating to Australia in 1836 with him and her sister, Theresa Walker (who became Australia's first female sculptor). They sailed to South Australia on board the John Renwick.

Her work is included in the collections of the Art Gallery of South Australia and the National Library of Australia.

Berkeley died in Camberwell, Victoria on 7 July 1899. At least two daughters survived her.

== Gallery of works ==
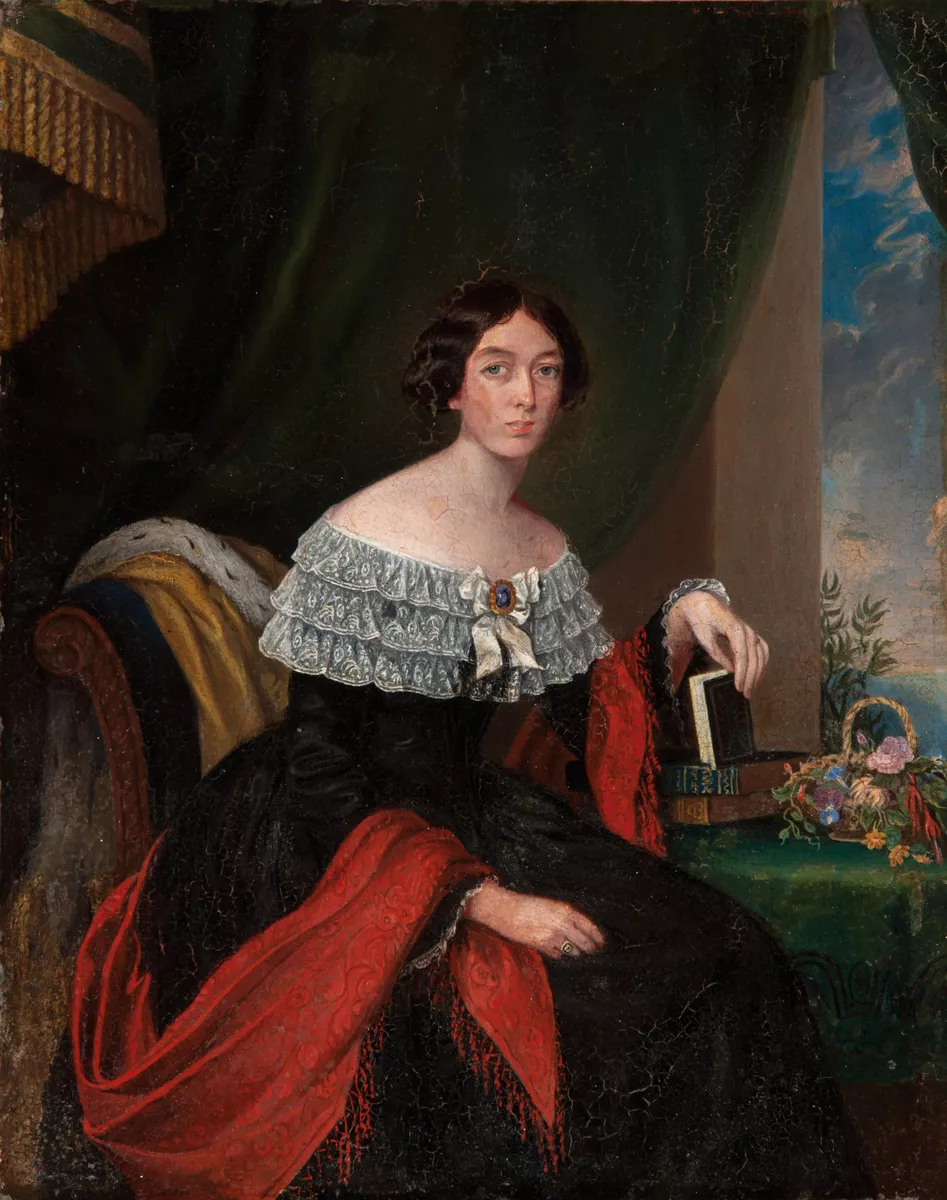
Theresa Walker, oil on metal, c.1846

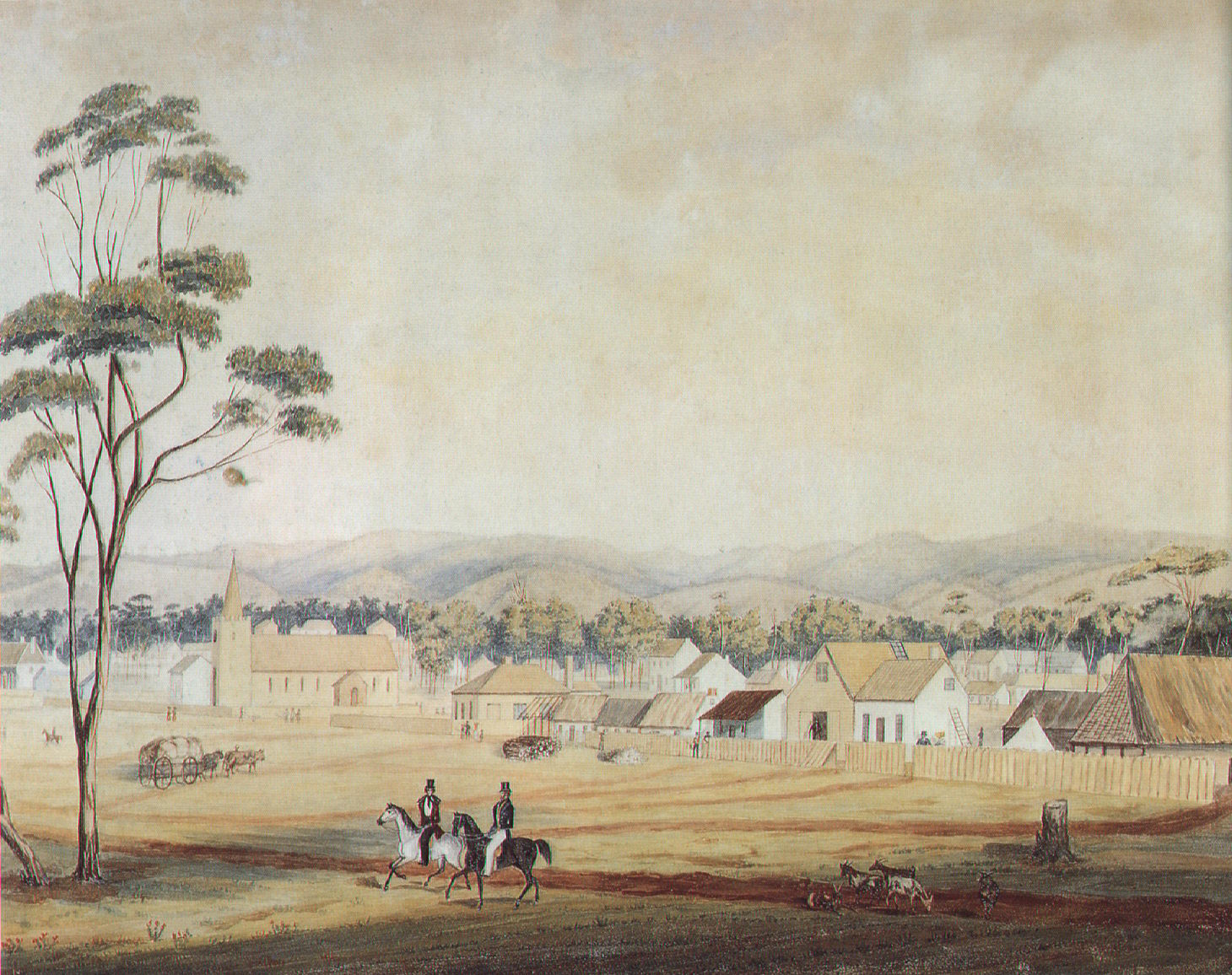
North Terrace, Adelaide, watercolour on paper, 1839

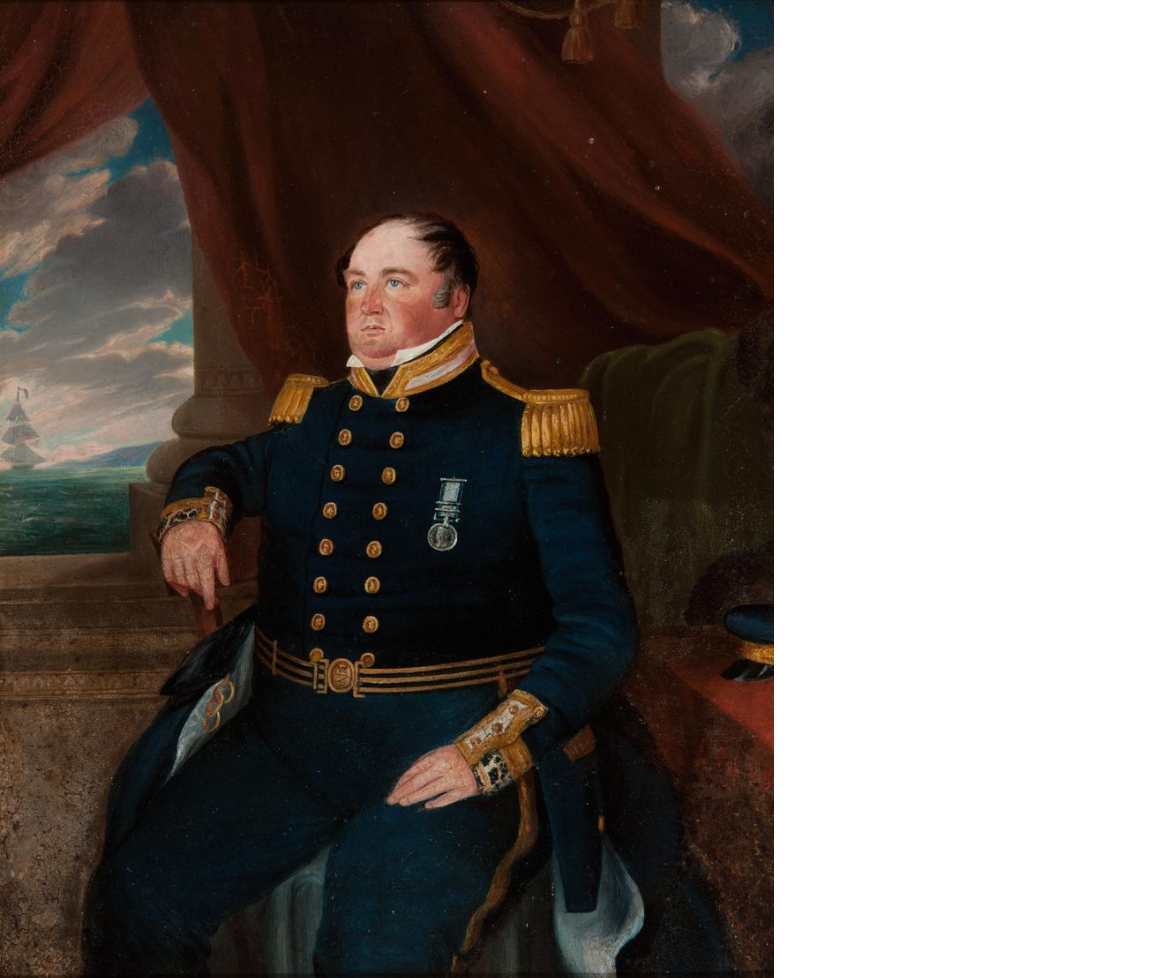
Captain John Walker R.N, oil on metal, c.1846

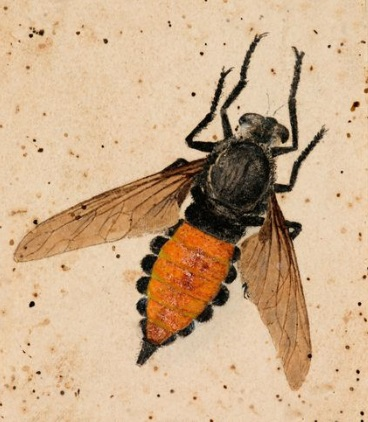
Tree Fly, watercolour on paper, 1837

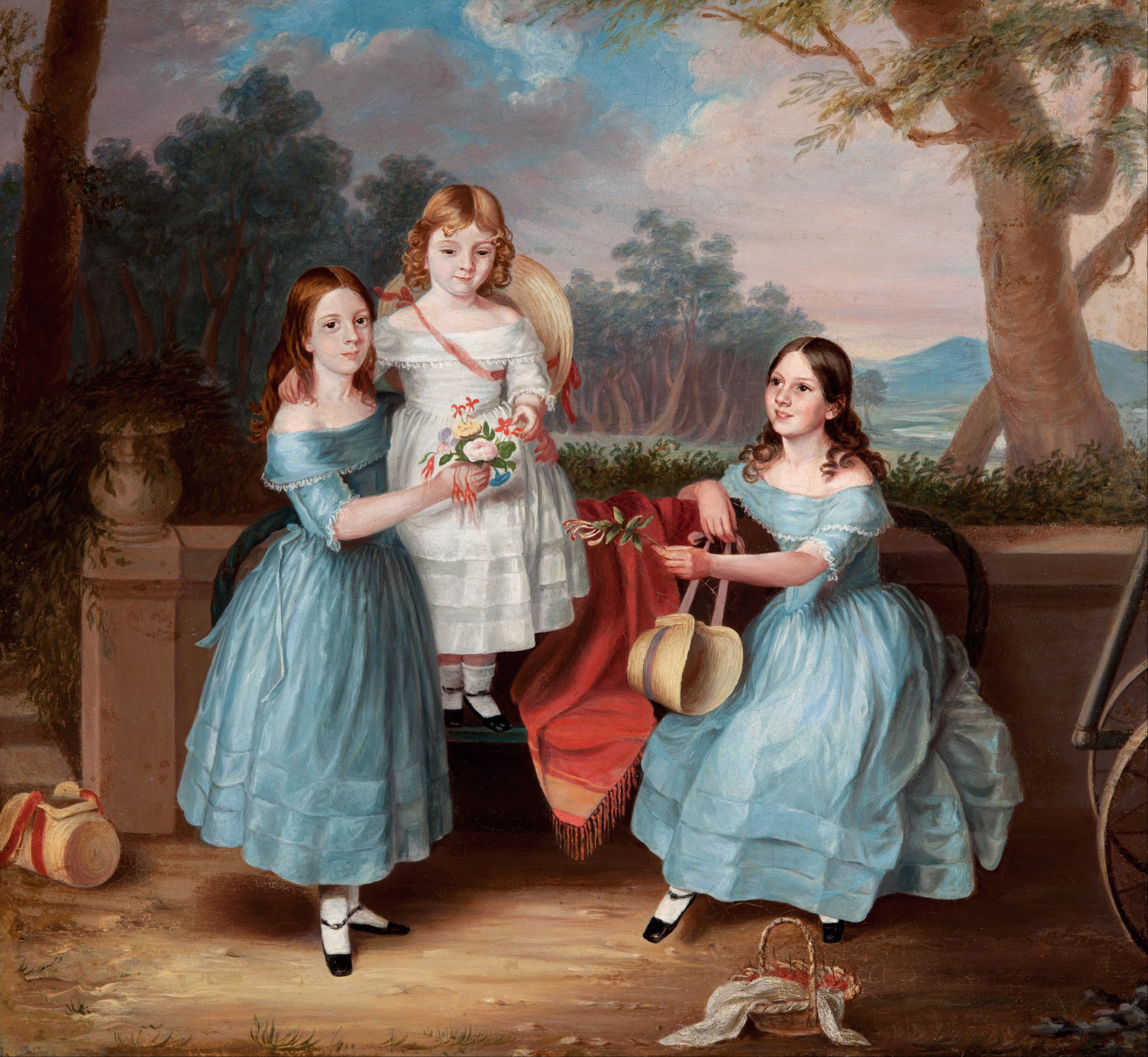
Georgina, Emily and Augusta Rose, oil on metal, 1848
