= Australian Legendary Tales =

Australian legendary tales collected by K. Langloh Parker

Australian Legendary Tales is a translated collection of stories told to K. Langloh Parker by Australian Aboriginal people.

The book was immediately popular, being revised or reissued several times since its first publication in 1896, and noted as the first substantial representation of cultural works by Aboriginal Australians.

The 1953 edition for children received the Children's Book Council of Australia's Children's Book of the Year Award for Older Readers.

== First edition ==
The first edition of Australian Legendary Tales: Folk-lore of the Noongahburrahs as Told to the Piccaninnies was published in 1896, being printed at London and Melbourne. The contents includes over 30 tales, with supplements that include a glossary and the first tale transliterated from the original language. The stories are set in a 'no-time' where animal spirits, supernatural beings and humans interact, often alluding to ideas of creation. Several references are made to an "All Father" Baiame, to a man Wurrunnah, a culture hero, and animal beings who engage with people and each other. Parker's prefatory remarks give acknowledgement to the "Noongahburrah" people and names some individuals who assisted her, the dedication is to man she describes as their king, Peter Hippi. The introduction by Andrew Lang also notes his inclusion of the illustrations, supplied by his brother at Corowa, by an "untaught Australian native"; the artist was later identified as Tommy McRae by the inscription on the original drawings amongst Lang's papers. This edition was popular so the sequel, More Australian Legendary Tales (1898), was commissioned, once again with the imprimatur of Lang as supervising scholar. Following on from the publication of these two volumes was Parker's factual work, The Euahlayi Tribe (1905), also issued at Lang's behest, though Parker herself seems to regard Lang's authority with increasing scepticism, making an aside in her own prefatory remarks that seem to target the severe views in Lang's introductions. Some years later more of her collection of Aboriginal legends appeared in The Walkabouts of Wurrunnah (1918) and Woggheeguy (1930).

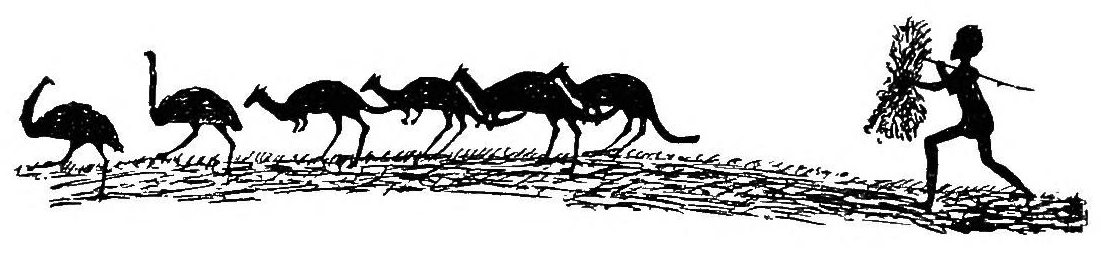
Illustration by Tommy McRae for the tale "The Weeoombeens and the Piggiebillah".

The book was prepared and marketed as part of a series overseen by Lang, similar to many other publications presented as scholarly works of folklore or fairy tales made English. These works often used the collections, made by English colonists and travellers, of spoken and written cultural materials appropriated from peoples of the British Empire and elsewhere. Lang used this work to promulgate and reiterate his previously published ideas within the overlapping or merging fields of anthropology, ethnology, and philology, incorporating the work of a people he had never encountered or studied in support of a position that was no longer favoured. Many contemporary and favourable reviews in British periodicals approached the book as a work of Lang's folklore scholarship. His introduction compares some of the tales to a primitive Metamorphoses and the early animal stories of Kipling. His opinion of McRae's drawings, "not ill-done" or worse, and the tales themselves is that they are the product of savage inferiors.

== Reviews and criticism ==
Criticism of Parker's own practices start with her qualifying remarks in the preface, presenting the tales as one's heard by 'piccaninnies' and translated merely for the enjoyment of 'English children'. Most of the contemporary reviews focus on the authority of Lang, though a review in Athenaeum praised the translation of Parker. A review in the Sydney Morning Herald agreed with Parker's belief that this was the first work in Australian literature to compile the legends of a particular group and exploit this as a folk-lore study. Later critics have reviewed the methods Parker outlined in her works more favourably; while they are practices that would later be regarded as unacceptable, they are at least as good or better than other collectors of the time. Parker had associated with Aboriginal Australians since her childhood on a station and continued to do so when she resided at a station near the Narran River in New South Wales. Later commentators noted Parker's familiarity and sympathy with the people, her thoroughness in collating word lists and translations make these Tales important in understanding the original tellers.

In an 1897 review, published in The Bulletin, A. G. Stephens described her source material as being ethnologically insignificant and seemingly an invention by Parker, she responded in an undated letter that defends her methods of translation:

"I am very careful to get them as truly as I can—first I get an old black to tell it in his own language—he probably has little English—I get a younger one to tell it back to him in his language he corrects what is wrong—then I get the other one to tell it to me in English—I write it down, read it and tell it back again to the old fellow with the help of the medium, for though I have a fair grasp of their language I could not in a thing like this trust to my knowledge entirely."

Parker invokes a folklore authority with two references to Max Müller in her preface, with whom Lang had a long running scientific feud, continued even in his obituary of that man. Her opinion of McRae's illustrations also describes the style as "rough", like Lang, although she stated that:

"The Blacks are the most observant people I have ever met [...] I am amused at their remarks re the shortcomings of my art – the difference between their art and mine is that however roughly theirs is done it has the look of life mine never has."

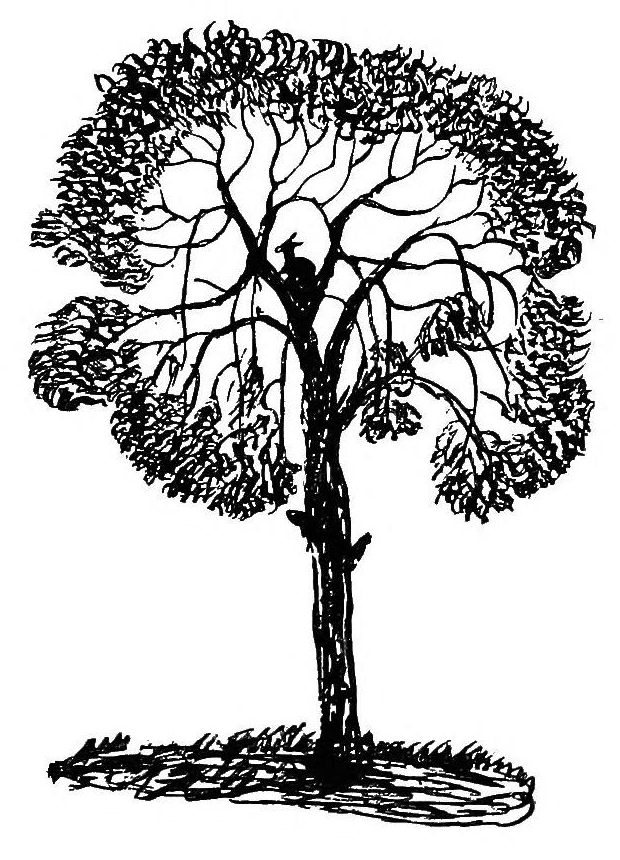
Illustration for Wirreenun the Rainmaker

== 1953 edition ==
Parker's collections of tales were again republished in Australia and Britain as Australian Legendary Tales (1953), selected and edited by Henrietta Drake-Brockman. This edition was appended with a study guide and bibliography, notes on editorial changes such as spelling, the deliberate omission of names from the sources and dedication, and other emendations. The illustrations were supplied by Elizabeth Durack, who also provides a context to her drawings execution in "the aboriginal manner". This edition was chosen by the Children's Book Council of Australia as "Book of the Year" for 1954. Drake-Brockman's preface refers to A. P. Elkin as an authority when supporting a claim that Parker "was in fact one of the first people to write exclusively of the Australian aborigines as fellow creatures" and,

"Perhaps she was, indeed, the first to set forth, to any noteworthy extent, their own vision of themselves and their conditions of living, so far as she was able to reproduce their thoughts and speech forms in written English. However well-intentioned earlier serious writers may have been, there remains in their work a hint of patronage, of 'outside' observance, of 'case-book' approach."

Vashti Farrer adapted some of these stories in Tales of the Dreamtime (1982), with illustrations by Walter Cunningham. Another selection from several of Parker's Tales was compiled as Wise Women of the Dreamtime: Aboriginal Tales of the Ancestral Powers (1993), with commentary by the editor, Johanna Lambert. As with the original edition, Lambert's recompilation included illustrations without attribution, except for the bark paintings of the artist Dorothy Djukulul.

== Bibliography ==
- Johnston, Judith "The Genesis and Commodification of Katherine Langloh Parker's Australian Legendary Tales (1896)" JASAL Vol 4 (2005) online at University of Sydney
- Marcie Muir (ed.). My Bush Book; K. Langloh Parker's 1890s. Adelaide, 1982 Story of Outback Life. [biographical sect.]
- "Parker, Catherine Langloh", entry in The Oxford Companion to Australian Literature. 2nd ed. 1994.
- Parker, K. Langloh. Australian Legendary Tales: Folk-lore of the Noongahburrahs as Told to the Piccaninnies. Collected by Mrs. K. Langloh Parker. Introduction by Andrew Lang. David Nutt, London; Melville, Mullen & Slade, Melbourne. 1896.
- Parker, K. Langloh. More Australian Legendary Tales. Collected from various tribes by Mrs. K. Langloh Parker. Introduction by Andrew Lang. David Nutt, London; Melville, Mullen & Slade, Melbourne. 1898.
- Parker, K. Langloh. The Euahlayi Tribe: A Study of Aboriginal Life in Australia. Introduction by Andrew Lang. Constable, London. 1905.
- Parker, K. Langloh. The Walkabouts of Wur-run-nah. Compiled by Catherine Stow (i.e. Mrs K. Langloh Parker). Hassell, Adelaide. 1918.
- Parker, K. Langloh. Woggheeguy: Australian Aboriginal Legends. Compiled by Catherine Stow (i.e. Mrs K. Langloh Parker). Illustrated by Nora Heysen. Preece, Adelaide. 1930.
- Parker, K. Langloh. Australian Legendary Tales Collected by Mrs. K. Langloh Parker. Selected and edited by H. Drake-Brockman. Illustrated by Elizabeth Durack. Sydney, London: Angus and Robertson. 1953.
