= Jandakot Airport =

Airport in Jandakot, Western Australia

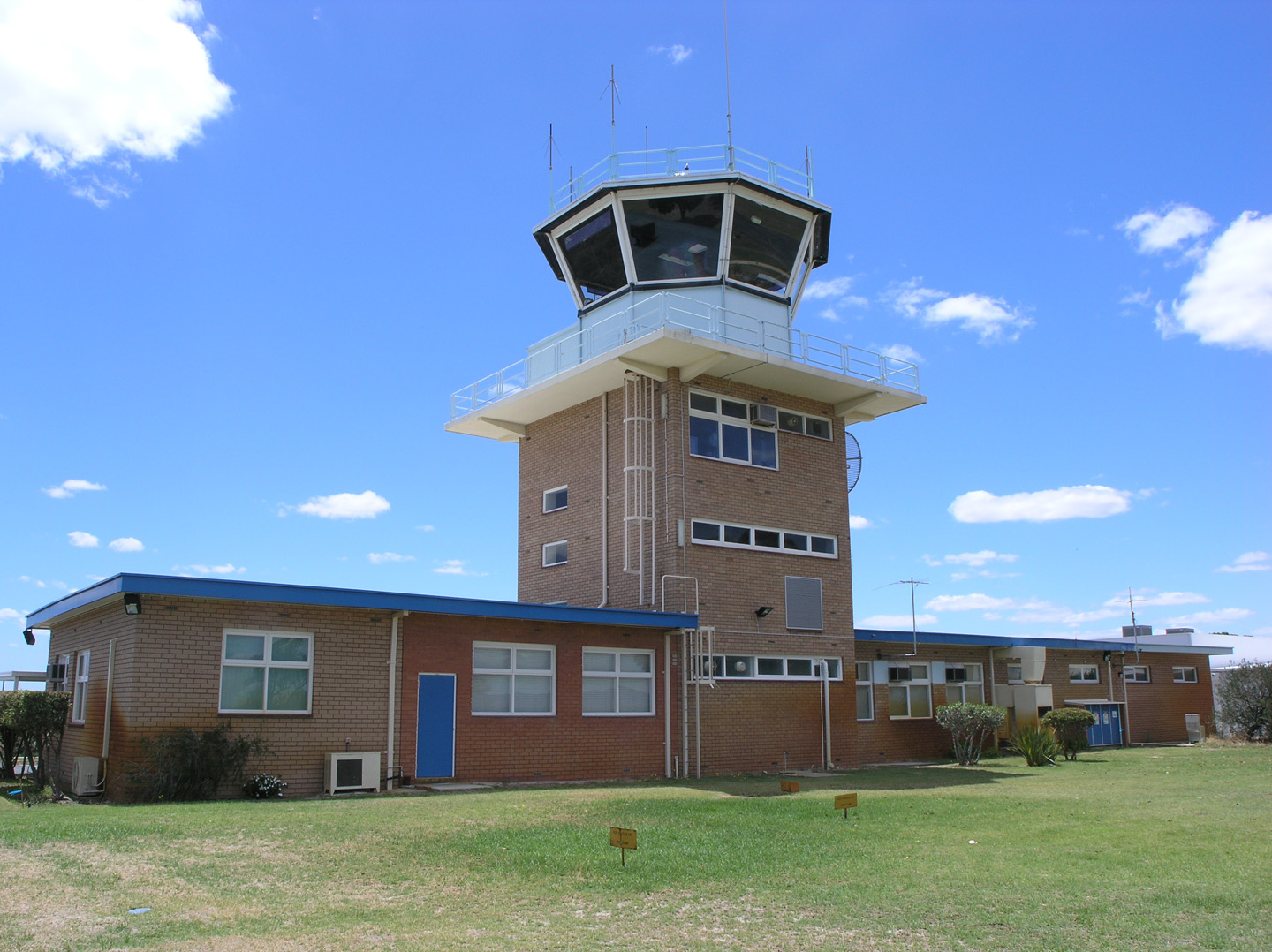
- IATA: JAD; ICAO: YPJT

Summary
- Airport type: Public
- Operator: Jandakot Airport Holdings
- Location: Perth, Western Australia
- Elevation AMSL: 99 ft (30 m)
- Coordinates: 32°05′51″S 115°52′52″E
- Website: www.jandakotairport.com.au

Map
- Location in Western Australia

Runways
| Direction | Length | | Surface |
| Direction | m | ft | Surface |
|---|---|---|---|
| 06R/24L | 1,150 | 3,773 | Asphalt |
| 06L/24R | 1,392 | 4,567 | Asphalt |
| 12/30 | 1,508 | 4,948 | Asphalt |

Statistics (2024/25)
- Busiest Civilian Airport Rank: 6
- Aircraft movements: 229,386
- Sources: Aircraft movements from Airservices Australia; Australian AIP and aerodrome chart

Jandakot Airport (IATA: JAD, ICAO: YPJT) is a general aviation (GA) airport in Jandakot, Western Australia that opened in 1963, about 20 kilometres (12 mi) south-southwest of Perth Airport. (Note: The General Aviation area of the western precinct at Perth Airport is about 700 metres (2,300 ft) north of terminals T3 and T4 that are planned to be moved to the eastern precinct for consolidation of all commercial air services around Airport Central station.)

Originally built on unproductive farm lands, it is now among residential suburbs in the south of the Perth metropolitan area, within the City of Cockburn, and just south of Leeming and west of Canning Vale.

In 1990, a second parallel runway opened. In 1997, a lease was sold by the Federal Airports Corporation to a consortium of local property developers.

Jandakot Airport is the busiest general aviation airport in Australia in terms of aircraft movements. The airport recorded 208,778 aircraft movements in the year ending 30 June 2018, making it the sixth-busiest civilian airport in Australia in that period as measured by aircraft movements. The airport reported 275,506 aircraft movements in the fiscal year 2011, making it the busiest civilian airport in Australia in terms of aircraft movements in that financial year. Jandakot Airport has a theoretical operating capacity of 526,000 aircraft movements per annum, which could be reached "within the 20-year planning horizon of" the 2014 Jandakot Airport Master Plan.

== Tenants ==
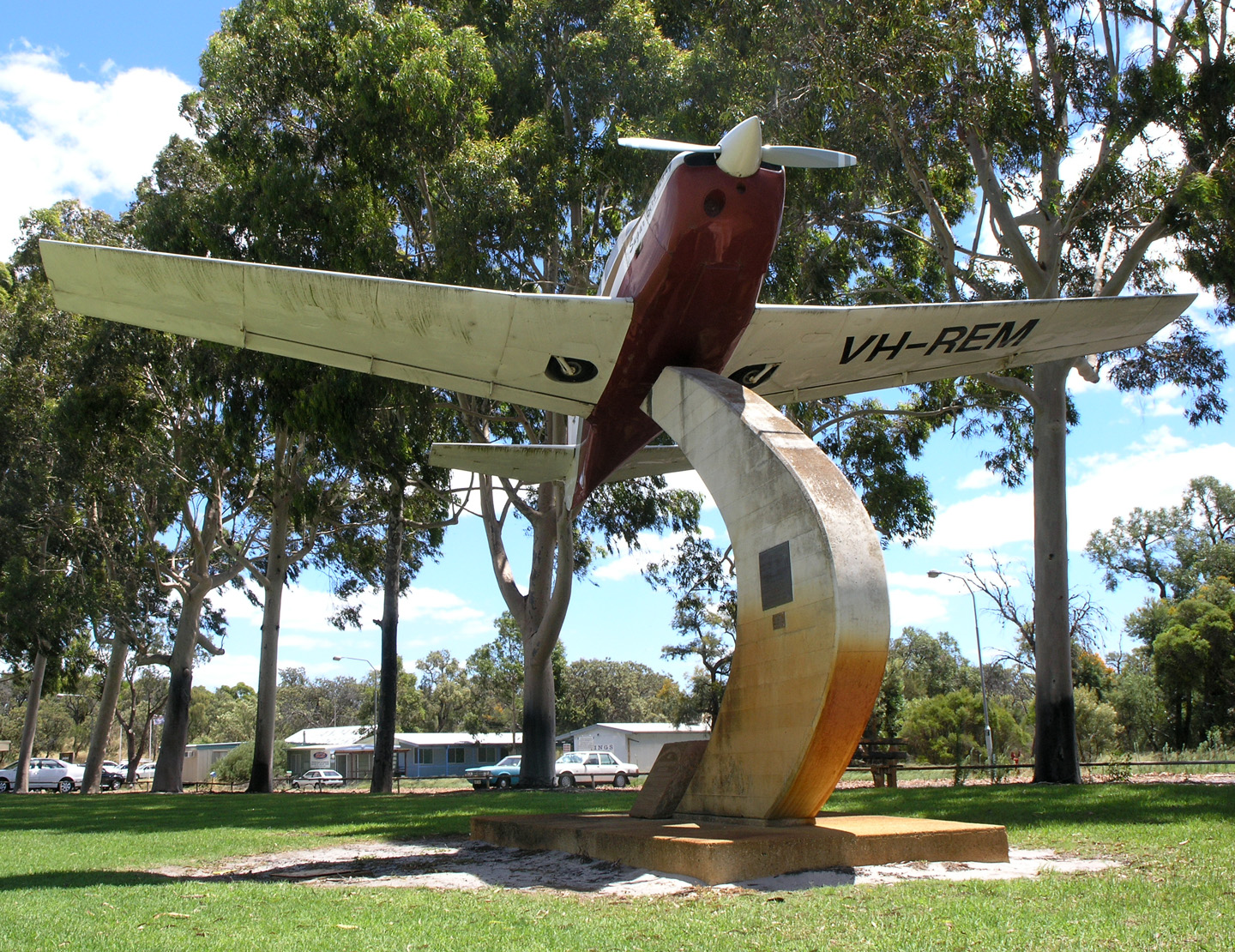
Robin Miller Memorial

The airport provides a base for essential service organisations such as the Royal Flying Doctor Service (RFDS), Department of Biodiversity, Conservation and Attractions Forest and Bushfire Patrol, Department of Fire and Emergency Services emergency helicopter and the Western Australia Police Force Air Support. Jandakot is also an important training base for international and domestic airline pilots, with Singapore Airlines operating its own pilot training establishment (Singapore Flying College); and Advanced Cockpit Flight Training.

Over 65 businesses employing 900 people operate at what is Australia's largest GA airport. In addition to nine flying schools for both fixed wing and rotary operations, three flying clubs, large maintenance, avionics, spares, instruments, electrical, aircraft sales, banner towing, aerial survey and photographic businesses are present. These include Airflite, a large defence contractor and Fugro the world's largest aerial geophysical survey company. There are also a number of charter operators such as Corsaire, Casair, Star Aviation and Brooks Airways - the latter two provide flights for the fly-in fly-out staff of remote mining companies among regular charter operations.

On the main road opposite the tower there is a memorial to Robin Miller, the "Sugarbird Lady", who as a nurse and later RFDS pilot brought vaccinations to remote Western Australian communities.

== Natural environment ==
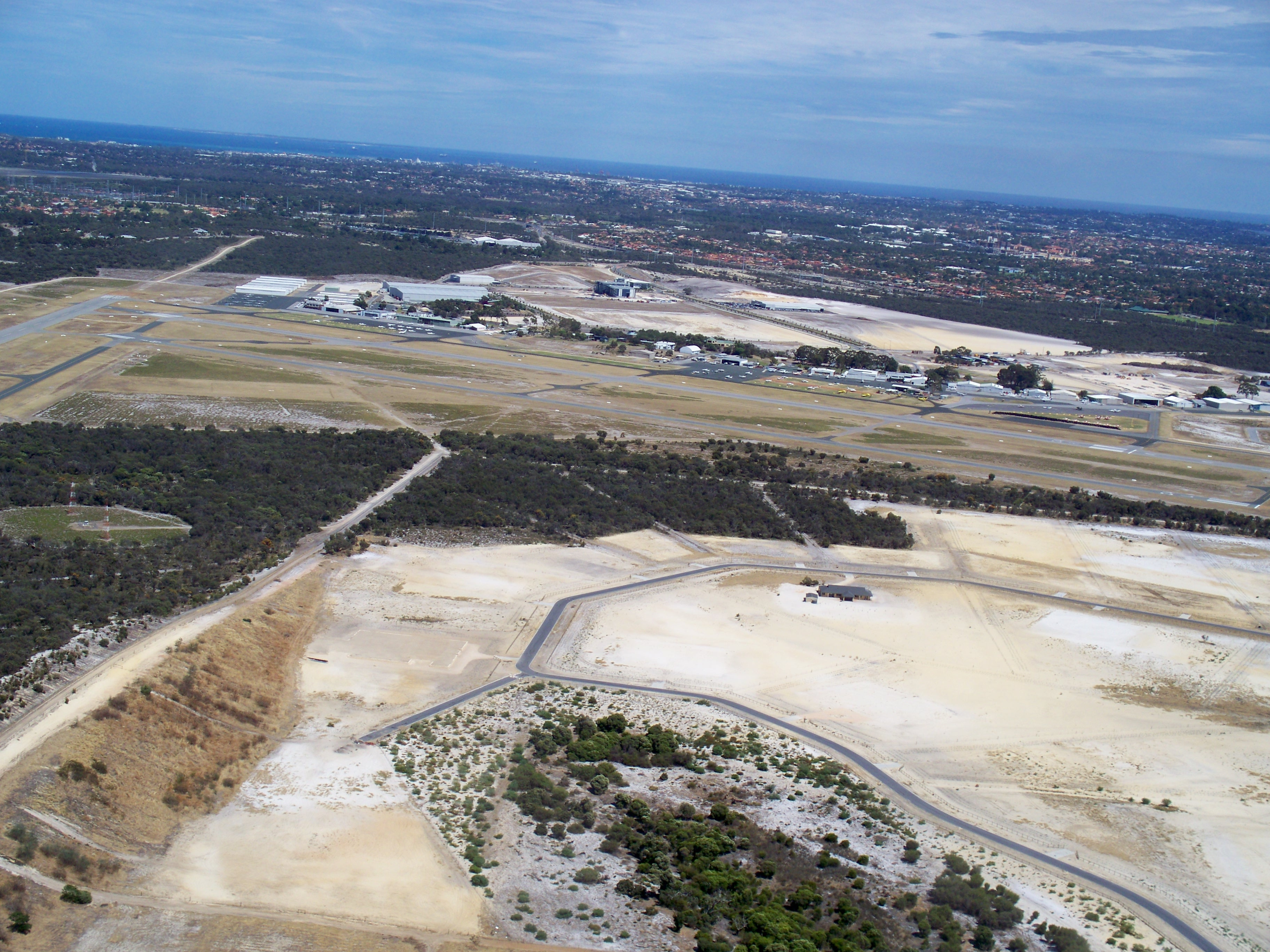
Jandakot Airport and surroundings

Jandakot Airport covers 6.22 km^{2} (2.40 sq mi) with 4 km^{2} (1.5 sq mi) of Banksia woodlands; this includes 2.8 km^{2} (1.1 sq mi) of conservation reserve. Within the airport boundaries, 290 native flora species have been identified including the endangered Grand Spider Orchid (caladenia hueglii). Over 100 fauna species have also been identified. The Southern Brown Bandicoot and kangaroos can be seen feeding on the maintained areas of grassland around sunset most nights. Two sites of Aboriginal heritage land have been identified with the airport; both of these are included in the conservation reserve. These sites contain scattered small artifacts.

== Relocation plans ==
On 15 June 2006, Jandakot Airport Holdings, after being bought out by property developer Ascot Capital, announced a proposal to relocate the airport's operations to the southern outskirts of Perth, possibly to a site in the Shire of Murray near the city of Mandurah. The proposal's success depends on the successful negotiation of a land swap arrangement with State and Federal governments. The Jandakot Airport Chamber of Commerce and many users of Jandakot Airport were opposed to the relocation, as were the residents of the proposed site but not the residents at its current site.

Minister for Transport Mark Vaile in December 2006 advised the leaseholders of Jandakot Airport that the Federal Government had effectively stopped any plans for the relocation of the airport for the foreseeable future. Under the provisions of the Airports Act 1996 and the lease granted to Jandakot Airport Holdings, the leaseholders are to give priority to running the airport as an airport.

== Jandakot City ==
In 2006, Ascot Capital announced plans to develop 149 hectares (370 acres) of land around the airport, approved for non-aviation related development by the federal government. The project would provide up to 500,000 square metres (5,400,000 sq ft) of leasable space. Harvey Norman confirmed that they will take up 20 hectares (49 acres), including 10,000 square metres (110,000 sq ft) of floorspace, in the first stage of Jandakot City.

== Accidents and incidents ==
On 26 April 2024, VH-POR, a De Havilland Chipmunk crashed into sand paddocks surrounding the runway. The sole occupant, a 73-year old man, died of his injuries in hospital on 29 April.

== Flight-specific information ==
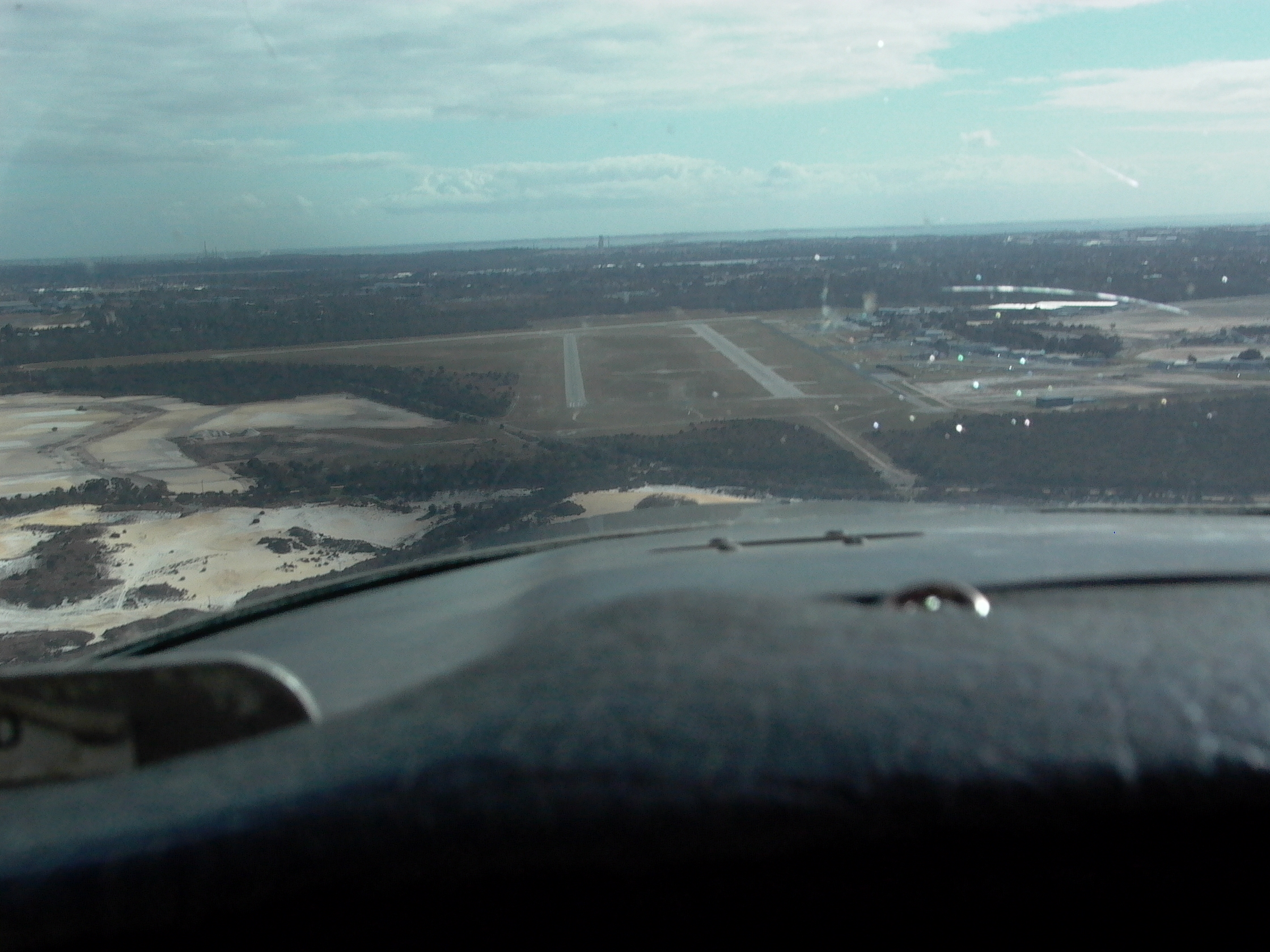
Jandakot Runways 24L and 24R

This airport has three runways:

- 06L/24R, 1,392 m × 30 m (4,567 ft × 98 ft)
- 06R/24L, 1,150 m × 18 m (3,773 ft × 59 ft)
- 12/30, 1,508 m × 30 m (4,948 ft × 98 ft)
- Latitude: 32°05'51"S (−32.096667)
- Longitude: 115°52'52"E (115.881667)
- Elevation: 99 ft (30 m)
- Time Zone: UTC+8
