= Robin Miller (nurse) =

Australian aviator and nurse (1940–1975)

- Powder Puff Derby pilots Robin Miller (L) and Rosemary de Pierres (R)
- Born: 8 September 1940; Subiaco, Perth
- Died: 7 December 1975 (aged 35); South Perth, Perth
- Resting place: Broome cemetery 17°57′30.94″S 122°13′19.31″E
- Other names: Dicks, Robin Elizabeth; Sister Robin Miller
- Occupations: Aircraft pilot; Nurse (general)
- Spouse: Harold Dicks
- Parents: Dame Mary Durack; Horrie Miller

Robin Elizabeth Miller (born 8 September 1940 – 7 December 1975), known as "The Sugar Bird Lady", was an Australian aviator and nurse. The name "The Sugar Bird Lady" was given to her by outback Aboriginal children during her work combatting polio. She died of cancer at the age of 35.

== Biography ==
Robin Elizabeth Miller was born on 8 September 1940 in Subiaco, Perth. Her mother was the writer Dame Mary Durack, and her father was an aviator, Captain Horrie Miller.

After obtaining a private pilot licence and a commercial flying licence while training as a nurse, she approached the Western Australian Department of Health to ask permission to fly to northern Western Australia to carry out a vaccination programme. Permission granted, she borrowed money for a Cessna 182 Skylane and set out on her first flight on 22 May 1967. Travelling to remote communities, she would treat children with the Sabin vaccine in sugar lumps. She later flew with the Royal Flying Doctor Service of Australia (RFDS).

In 1973 she married Harold Dicks, the director of the Royal Flying Doctor Service, and became Robin Miller Dicks. Later that year she was sponsored along with Rosemary de Pierres to compete in the 1973 All Women's Transcontinental Air Race across the United States, also known as the Powder Puff Derby, finishing sixth past the finishing post.

Miller died of cancer on 7 December 1975 in South Perth, aged 35. Following her death, her husband set up a A$50,000 memorial foundation to help nurses acquire flying licences.

She is remembered fondly in Perth, Western Australia; as well as the large memorial in Jandakot Airport, there is also a seminar room in the Royal Perth Hospital named after her, in addition to a road at Perth Airport: Sugarbird Lady Road.

== Quotes ==
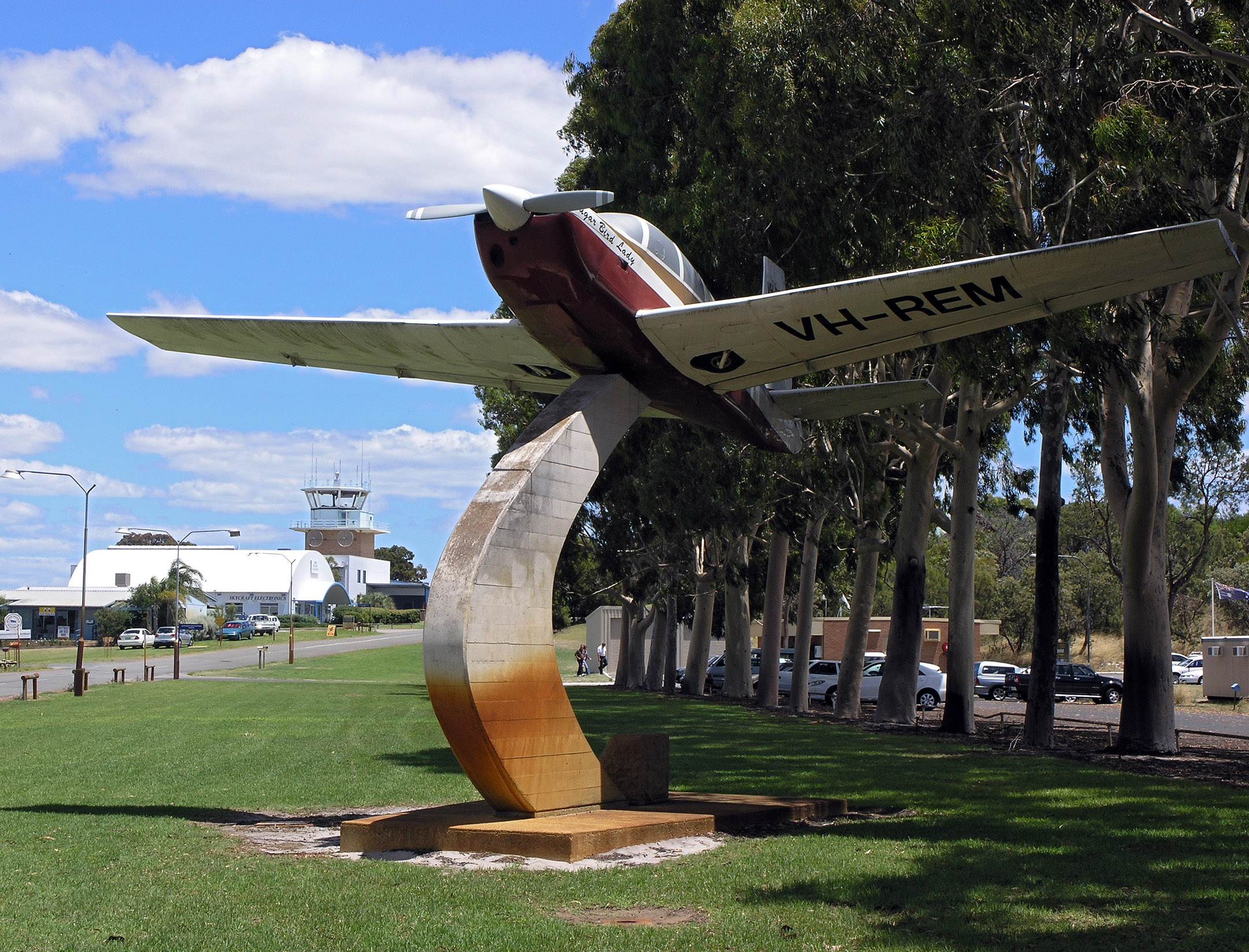
Memorial to The Sugar Bird Lady at Jandakot Airport, Perth, Western Australia, unveiled in 1978. (Replica Mooney Super 21)

Two quotes from ABC's "George Negus Tonight" described her flying prowess:

Nancy Bird (a friend):

"One was a solo flight from Paris to Australia. And in another one, I think she actually came across the Pacific. Later, did a copilot flight across the Atlantic. So she circumnavigated the world. She was one of the outstanding women pilots of the 20th century and we should recognise her as such."

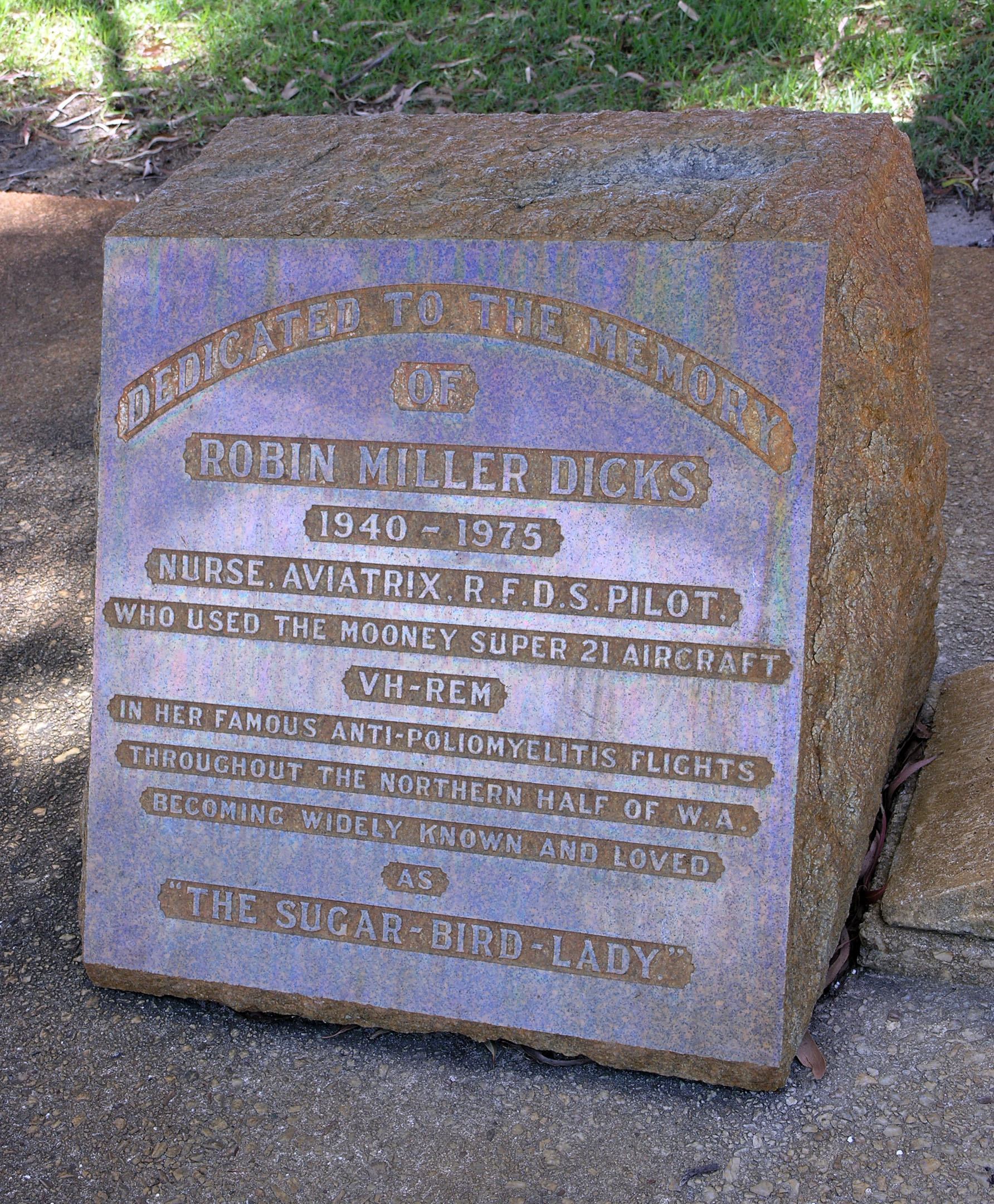
Memorial to The Sugar Bird Lady.

Michael Page (publisher):

"She was so used, for example, to doing things like flying in through a thunderstorm to an outback station where there was nothing you could really call a landing ground, and getting down there and then picking up someone who had perhaps been gored by a bullock, you know, with a great wound in the abdomen, getting them into the aircraft, and flying back to Perth or Broome or wherever it was where the nearest hospital was. But she was, er ... 'Well, you know, what's so interesting about that?'"

== Awards ==
- Diploma of Merit — Associazione Nazionale Infermieri, Italy (1969)
- Nancy Bird (Walton) Award — Australia's woman pilot of the year (1970)
- Paul Tissandier Diploma — Federation Aeronautique Internationale (posthumous)
- Brabazon Cup — Women Pilots' Association of Great Britain (posthumous)
