= Eileen Keys =

New Zealand born potter

Eileen Constance Keys
- Born: Eileen Constance Mitchell; 24 December 1903; Christchurch
- Died: 16 September 1992 (aged 88); Perth
- Education: Chelsea School of Art
- Occupation: potter
- Known for: using Australian materials
- Spouse: George Eric Maxwell Keys
- Children: three

Eileen Constance Keys born Eileen Constance Mitchell (24 December 1903 – 16 September 1992) was a New Zealand born potter. She returned from studying art in London inspired by clay. She created pottery using locally sourced materials and these are in galleries across Australia.

== Life ==
Keys was born on Christmas Eve 1903 in Christchurch. Her Methodist parents were Alice May (born Pleasance) and John Martin Mitchell. Her father was an English immigrant who made furniture and her mother was born in New Zealand. She had three elder siblings and another followed her. She attended the Anglican school for girls, St Margaret's College, before she went on to study at Canterbury College School of Art. She learned the Montessori approach to caring for young children.

After travelling in Europe she began work as a teacher at the Cathedral Grammar School in her home city in 1925. She was there for four years until 1929 when she married a fellow teacher named George Eric Maxwell Keys. From 1939 to 1941 she experimented with ceramics as she studied at the Chelsea School of Art in London. Her husband was also in England studying education. It was reported that while in London she went to buy interesting minerals and the vendor commented that she should use the minerals of her native Australia. This was a theme of her later work.

In 1947 the family were in Perth where her husband was the new head at Scotch College and she became the boys' art teacher. She encouraged her students to bring in clay they had found locally and this was combined with glazes made from ashes to create their pottery. She taught elsewhere and she created her own artworks. She and weaver Hilda Stephens had a joint exhibition of their work. In 1951 she had a joint exhibition with the painter Elizabeth Durack. They put their work together in still-life arrangements inspired by Georges Braque.

She was a founding member of the Craft Association of Australia. She was a strong influence on other artists like the basket weaver Nalda Searles. Keys has been called "the godmother of West Australian ceramics".

== Death and legacy ==
Her husband died in 1986 and Keys died in 1992 in Perth. Her work has appeared at auction. In 2022 one of her pieces was sold for about 1,100 USD. Keys work is in galleries in Ballarat, Brisbane, Christchurch, Hobart, Melbourne, Perth and Sydney.
