= Mary Durack =

Australian novelist and historian (1913–1994)

Dame Mary Durack AC DBE
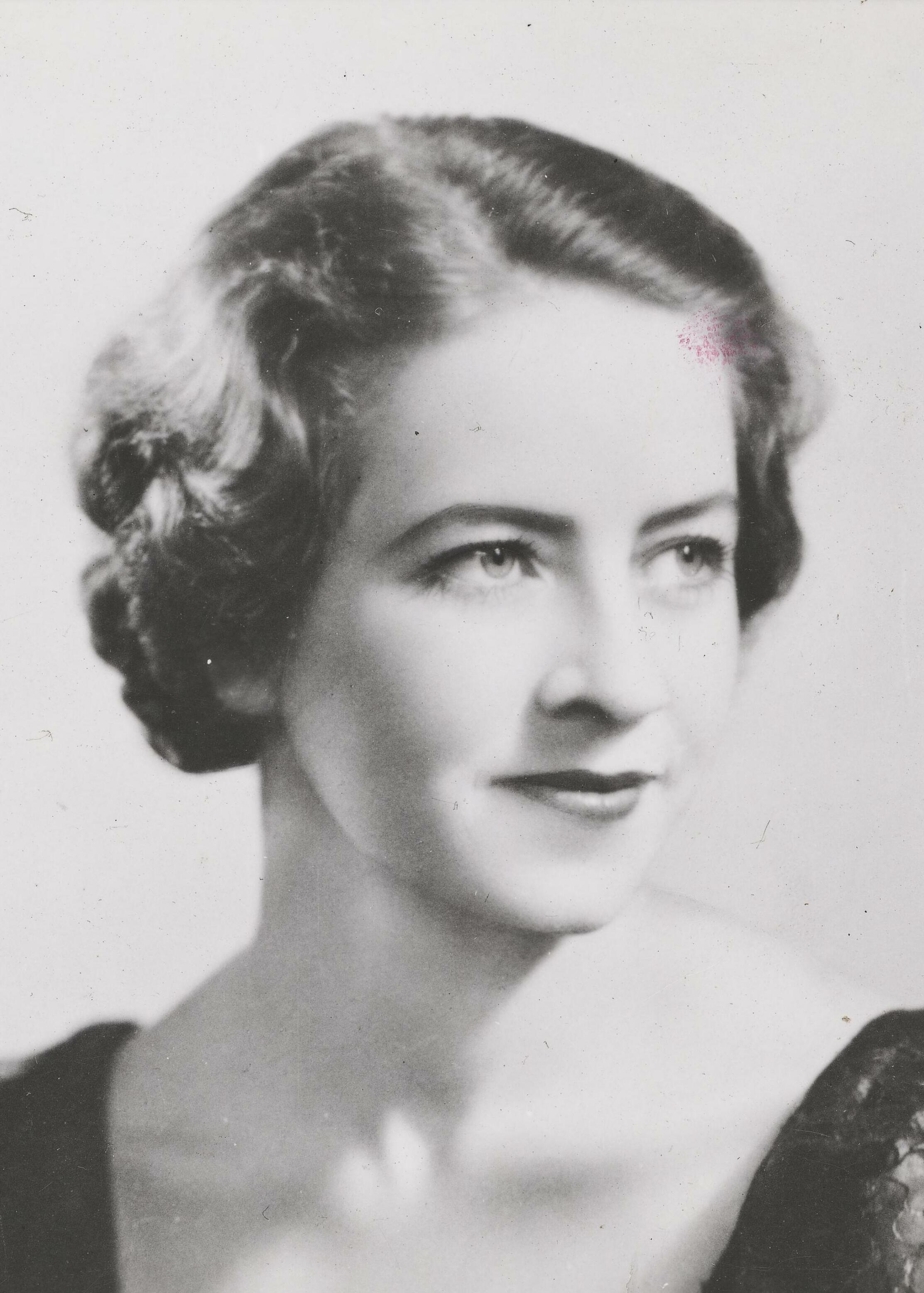
- Born: 20 February 1913; Adelaide, South Australia
- Died: 16 December 1994 (aged 81); Nedlands, Western Australia
- Occupations: Author; historian
- Spouse: Horace Miller (m. 1938; died 1980)
- Writing career
- Years active: 1934–1994

Dame Mary Durack AC DBE (20 February 1913 – 16 December 1994) was an Australian author and historian. She wrote Kings in Grass Castles and Keep Him My Country.

== Childhood ==
Mary Durack, born in Adelaide, South Australia, to Michael Patrick Durack (1865–1950) and Bessie Durack (née Johnstone), and her siblings lived at the remote Argyle Downs and Ivanhoe cattle stations in the Kimberley region of Western Australia. In the late 1920s and early 1930s Mary and her sister Elizabeth would manage the Ivanhoe cattle station, whilst their brother would leave to manage Argyle Downs. During these times they would live and work very closely with the indigenous people who worked on, and lived near the station. The Durack family were pioneers in the settlement of the area by Europeans. The story of her family's history, beginning with the mid-19th century migration from Ireland, is presented by Durack in Kings in Grass Castles, and its sequel, Sons in the Saddle.

== Writing ==
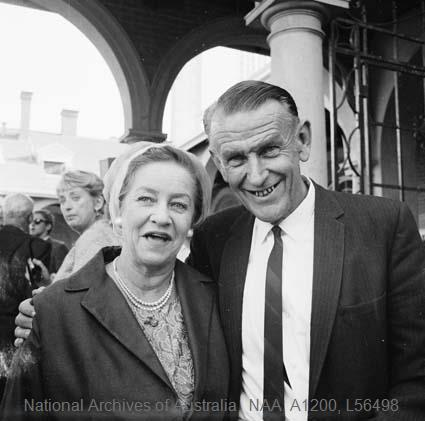
Durack with Ian Mudie in 1966

"Little Poems of Sunshine-by an Australian Child." This is the name of a small book of verses composed by Mary Durack as a 10-year-old in 1923.

In 1935, Mary and her sister, Elizabeth, were to publish their first collaboration. The text in All About: The Story of a Black Community on Argyle Station was supplied by Mary and the illustrations were by Elizabeth. The collaboration was to produce a number of children's books: Chunuma in 1936; Son of Djaro and the Way of the Whirlwind in 1940–1941;The Magic Trumpet in 1946 and To Ride a Fine Horse (1963).

Mary Durack wrote under the name "Virgilia" for The Western Mail between 1934 and 1938, in a column for women and children in rural areas called Virgilians' Friendly Corner. The column represented some of the first work Durack published as a paid writer, however, she felt limited by the demands of her readers and would often hide in her office to avoid meeting with fans of 'The Corner'. In 1950 she wrote the novel Keep Him My Country. Other important works include the saga of the Durack family, Kings in Grass Castles (1959) and its sequel, Sons in the Saddle; and a play, Swan River Saga: Life of Early Pioneer Eliza Shaw (1976). A biography, To Be Heirs Forever, also used Eliza Shaw as a subject. Durack also continued to write children's literature, most notably the story of the Nyungar man, Yagan, which was published in 1964 as The Courteous Savage: Yagan of the Bibbulmun and Tjakamarra: Boy between two worlds.

Other works by Mary Durack included a two–act play, Ship of Dreams; an Australian Settler (1968); The Rock and the Sand (1969) is a history of missionaries in the state; The Aborigines in Australian Literature (1978) is part of the non-fiction component of her work, a subject often forming the basis of many of her works of fiction.

Durack adapted Keep Him My Country into the libretto for a one-act opera, Dalgerie, by James Penberthy; it premiered in Perth on 22 January 1959. On 25 July 1973, along with Larry Sitsky's The Fall of the House of Usher, it was one of the first two operas to be given an evening performance at the Sydney Opera House.

Her literary works include the editing of The Fifth Sparrow (1972), a posthumously published autobiography of the Western Australian author Mollie Skinner.

She contributed to the Australian Dictionary of Biography.

== Personal life ==
On 2 December 1938, she married the aviator, Captain Horrie C. Miller, OBE, who died in 1980. They had two sons and four daughters, including Robin Miller, a famous aviator and nurse who was known as "The Sugarbird Lady" after her work fighting polio. Two of Dame Mary Durack's daughters predeceased her.

== Honours and distinctions ==
Durack was appointed a Dame Commander of the Order of the British Empire (DBE) for her services to literature on 31 December 1977. On 12 June 1989, she was appointed a Companion of the Order of Australia (AC).

== Bibliography ==
=== Novels ===
- All-About : The Story of a Black Community on Argyle Station, Kimberley (1935)
- Keep Him My Country (1955)

=== Children's fiction ===
- Chunuma (1936)
- Son of Djaro (1940)
- The Way of the Whirlwind (1941)
- A Book of Picture Stories (1942)
- To Ride a Fine Horse (1963)
- Kookanoo and Kangaroo (1963)

=== Poetry collections ===
- Little Poems of Sunshine : By an Australian Child (1923)
- Piccaninnies (1940)
- The Magic Trumpet (1946)

=== Non-fiction ===
- Time and Tide : the Story in Pictures of Roebuck Bay, N.W. Australia (1946)
- Kings in Grass Castles (1959) - biography
- The Courteous Savage : Yagan of Swan River (1964) - biography
- A Pastoral Emigrant (1965)
- The Rock and the Sand (1969)
- To Be Heirs Forever (1976)
- The Aborigines in Australian Literature (1978) - criticism
- The End of Dreaming (1978)
- A Legacy of Love (1981) - biography
- Sons in the Saddle (1983) - biography

== See also ==
- Australian outback literature of the 20th century
