= Michael Durack =

Australian politician (1865–1950)

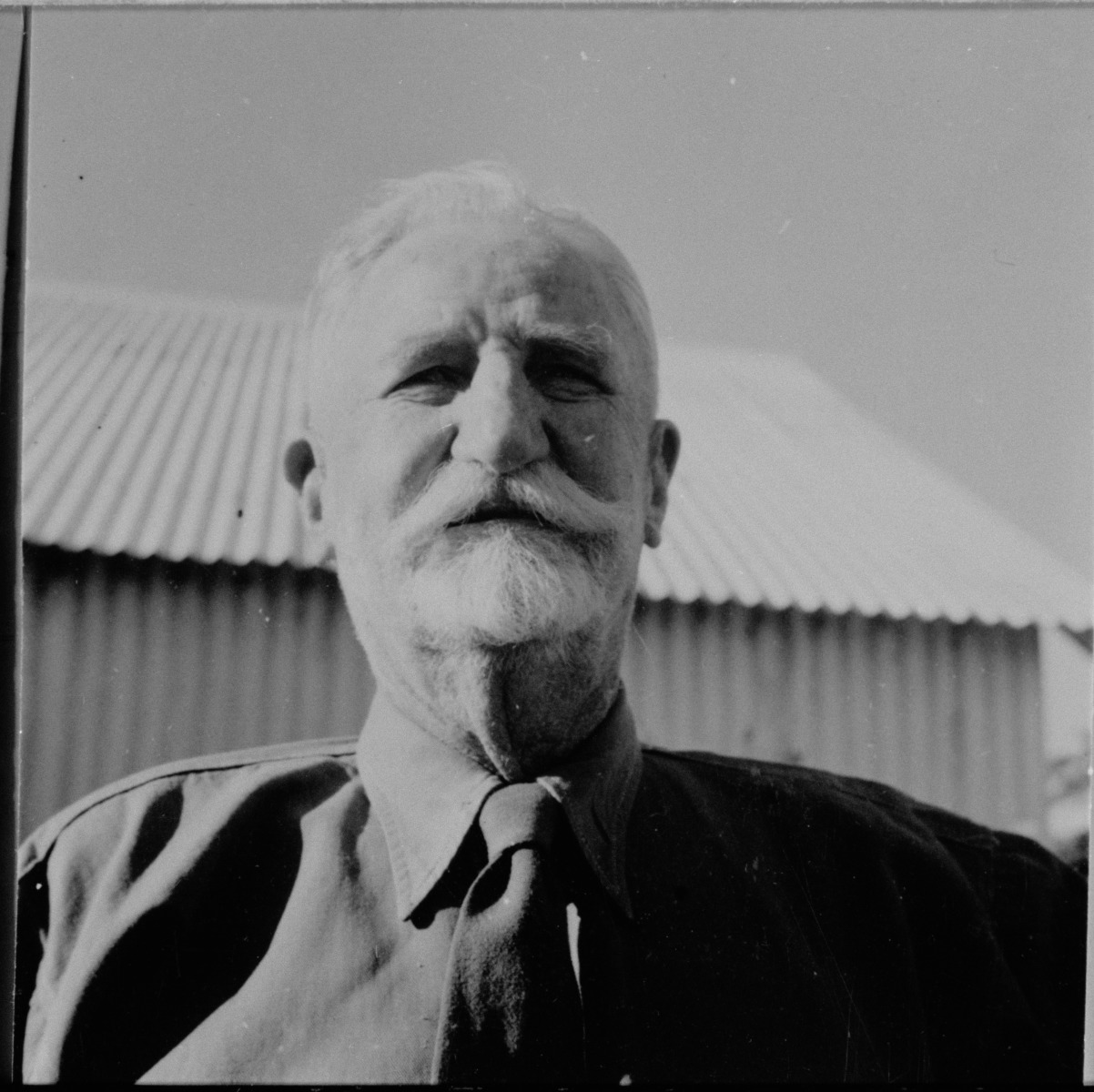
- Michael Patrick Durack, circa 1948
- Born: 22 July 1865; Grabben Gullen, New South Wales
- Died: 3 September 1950 (aged 85); Perth, Western Australia
- Education: St Patrick's College, Goulburn
- Occupations: Politician, Western Australian pioneer
- Spouse: Bessie Ida Muriel Johnstone
- Children: Kim Durack, David Durack, Reginald Durack, William Durack, Mary Durack, Elizabeth Durack
- Parent(s): Patrick Durack & Mary Costello

Michael Patrick Durack (22 July 1865 – 3 September 1950) was a pastoralist and pioneer in Queensland and Western Australia, known as "M.P." or to the family as "Miguel". He was the son of Patrick Durack and Mary Costello, both Irish-Australians.

== Life and career ==
Durack was educated at St Patrick's College, Goulburn along with his brother, John Wallace.

In 1882, he bought the Archerfield pastoral run consisting of 8,827 acres (35.72 km^{2}) in Queensland.

In 1882–83, his family went on an expedition to the Kimberley region of Western Australia. On his 21st birthday, he made the first sale of Kimberley cattle to a Halls Creek butcher for £1,200 in raw gold.

In 1894, a new shipping trade was established by Francis Connor and Denis Doherty from Wyndham to Perth. The Durack family became one of the main suppliers in this market, and eventually merged with their shipping agents to form Connor, Doherty & Durack Ltd, which controlled nearly 16,000 square kilometres (6,000 mi^{2}) of property on the Western Australia-Northern Territory border. His firm was a major influence on the Kimberley pastoral industry for the next fifty years.

He negotiated a shipment of 3,612 cattle to Natal in 1902, which was long hailed a record overseas consignment of live cattle.

In 1917, he entered the Western Australian Legislative Assembly as the Nationalist Party member for the Kimberley. He became discontented with the Mitchell government, and in 1920 joined the Country Party, subsequently retiring from politics in 1924.

In 1921 M.P. Durack assisted the scientific party which had arrived at Wyndham, Western Australia, for determinations of the north Western Australia border between Western Australia and the Northern Territory.

Circa 1939, the Connor, Doherty & Durack tract became the subject of the Kimberley Plan to resettle Jewish refugees from Europe. The proposal was vetoed by the Australian government in 1944.

He died on 3 September 1950 and was buried in Karrakatta Cemetery.

The suburb of Durack in Brisbane is named after him, as he was one of the landholders of the Archerfield pastoral station. It was given this name in 1976 following a naming competition in a local newspaper.

== Notable family members ==
=== Jerry Galway ===
Jerry "Galway" Durack was the youngest son of Michael and Mary and the first to be born in Australia, when the family were still in Queensland. Jerry married Francis Neale, of New South Wales, in 1880.

In 1901, Galway Jerry was killed on his station while most of the family were in Perth. The incident, in which Jerry and Francis's eldest son Patrick was also wounded, and the subsequent chase, capture and trial, made waves across Australia. It was the subject of more than one hundred newspaper articles spread across every corner of the country. Despite this, Francis returned to the station and continued rearing the rest of the family, until it was sold in 1913.

=== John "J.P." "Roaring Jack" "Black Jack" Durack ===
John Peter William Durack founded the Perth Law Firm Dwyer Durack in 1915 and was born to Jerry "Galway" Durack and Francis Neale in 1888. After John's birth in Ipswich, Queensland, the family relocated to the Kimberly region of Western Australia in 1889. Francis, described as an intellectual woman, insisted her children received a good education and as a result John and his brother Neal traveled from the Kimberley to Perth to attend the Christian Brothers College until 1907 where he excelled in boxing demonstrations and reciting poetry and Shakespeare, as well as receiving the elocution prize from JS Battye. In cricket, he was an all-rounder.

After being articled to one ML Moss KC, JP Durack was admitted to the bar in August 1913, and took up practice on Howard Street. At this time he started using the name "John Peter", as Peter had been his nickname in college, to distinguish himself from his cousin, the identically initialled John Wallace Durack, who also had his office on Howard Street, which meant a lot of misdirected mail, and constant meet-ups to amend this. The name stuck, and he was known as John Peter, or JP forever more, although it seems he was still referred to John William on the odd formal occasion. In 1917, JP took leave of his practice to enlist as a serviceman during World War 1. He served with the 10th Light Horse Brigade in Egypt, Palestine and Syria and by World War 2, he had the rank of Major in the Army Legal Corps.

JP married Pleasance Rowe in April 1922 and lived at "Strathmore" at 18 Chester Street, Subiaco, which was built in 1904 for Walter David Cookes, founder of the Ezywalkin Boot and Shoe Company. Together they had one son, Peter, in 1928.

A hobby for JP was hunting, serving as President of the Hunt Club of Western Australia and he and Peter kept horses to ride through Kings Park.

In his legal career, JP Durack represented a variety of cases. This includes, farmers, tradesmen and unionists, workers, lumpers, bar staff, beleaguered husbands and wives, politicians, store owners and recent migrants. He was involved in divorce, licensing, probate, criminal, litigation and commercial cases. He was appointed a Kings Counsel in June 1939, at the age of fifty. He served as President of the Law Society of Western Australia from 1943 to 1945. Several cases in which he was involved during the 1950s attracted attention, including one which went to the Privy Council in London.

JP Durack continued practising law at Dwyer Durack until the 1970s, when he was well into his eighties. He died in 1978.

== See also ==
- Elizabeth Durack
- Mary Durack
- Kings in Grass Castles by Dame Mary Durack, based on the life and times of her grandfather Patrick Durack
