= Theresa Walker =

Australian artist

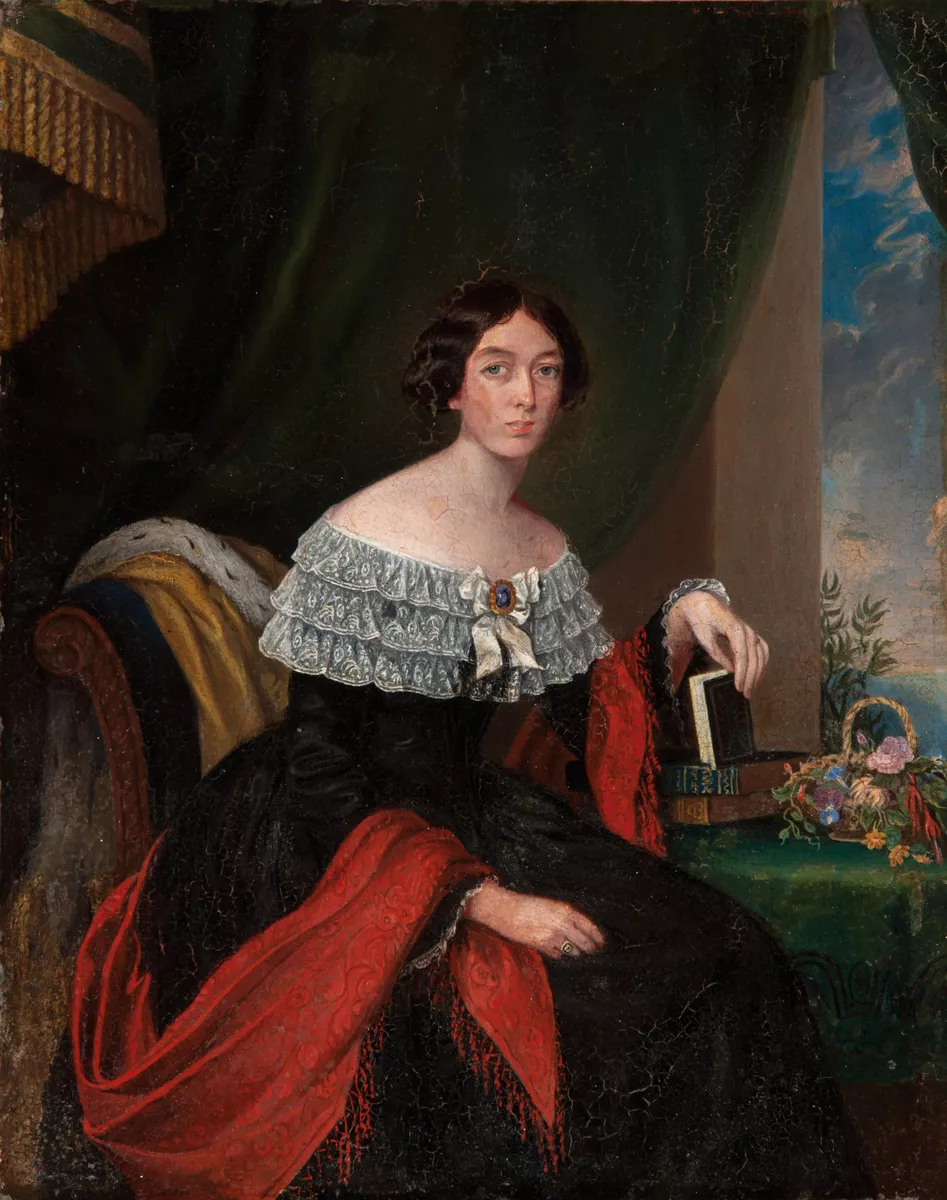
- Theresa Walker, by her sister Martha Berkeley, c.1846
- Born: 1807; Keynsham
- Died: 17 April 1876; South Yarra
- Occupations: Sculptor, photographer, painter

Theresa Susannah Eunice Snell Walker (1807 – 16 April 1876) was Australia's first woman sculptor and the first resident Australian artist to be shown in the Royal Academy of Arts in London. An artist, photographer, sculptor and wax modeller, she is best known for her low relief wax profile portraits.

Born in England, elder daughter of William Chauncy and his first wife Theresa, nee Lamothe. After education in England and France, and brief art training as a member of Edward Irving's church in London, Walker migrated to South Australia in February 1837 with her sister, Martha Berkeley, and brother-in-law Captain Charles Berkeley.

Walker visited Van Diemen's Land in 1837 where she met and married Lieutenant John Walker, harbour-master at Launceston. They returned to Adelaide where he set up as a merchant in Hindley Street, Adelaide. Their town acre came with a country section they named Havering on the Upper Torrens River. In 1838 Martha Berkeley, Walker's sister, painted the portraits of both Theresa and John Walker.

In 1838 the village (now suburb) of Walkerville was named after John Walker. In 1841 Lt. Walker (also known as Captain Walker) suffered reverses during the State's depression and was imprisoned for bankruptcy. After his release the Walkers moved interstate ending up in Launceston where John Walker died in. In September 1856 Theresa married Professor George Herbert Poole, a Swedenborgian minister and moved to Victoria.

Her work is included in Australia in the collections of the National Portrait Gallery, the Art Gallery of South Australia, the National Gallery of Australia and the State Library of Victoria. The State Library of South Australia has listed 24 photographs of 'wax bust' profiles dated 1838-1845. An example of her work is also held by the Philadelphia Museum of Art.

Twice married and twice widowed, Walker died in South Yarra on 16 April 1876.

== Works in Collections ==
=== Art Gallery of South Australia ===
- Kartamiru (also known as Murlawirrapurka, King John and Onkaparinga Jack) c.1840
- Mukata, wife of King John (also known as Pretty Mary) c.1840
- Portraits of South Australian residents c.1840s
- Governor Grey 1845
- Portrait of a clergyman c.1840s
- Portrait of a lady c.1840
- Theresa Walker c.1838
- Havering (Pastel on paper) c1839

=== Other collections ===
- Mrs Grey c1845 at National Portrait Gallery
- Sir George Grey c1845 at National Portrait Gallery
- Sir Charles Fitzroy c1846 at National Gallery of Australia
- Sir John Franklin (after David D'Angers) at National Gallery of Australia
- John Clark of Cluny, Tasmania 1848 at National Gallery of Australia
- Philip Chauncy c1860 at National Gallery of Australia
- William Chauncy c1860 at National Gallery of Australia
- Annie Chauncy c1860 at National Gallery of Australia
- Theresa Walker c1860 at National Gallery of Australia
- Dr William Bland c1848-49 at Powerhouse Museum

== Exhibitions ==
- 1841 Royal Academy, London
- 1848 Adelaide
- 1845, 1847, 1849 Sydney
- 1853, 1861 Melbourne
- 1857 Geelong
