= Kings in Grass Castles =

Book by Mary Durack

- First UK edition
- Author: Mary Durack
- Language: English
- Publisher: Constable & Co. (UK)
- Publication place: Australia
- ISBN: 9781741667592

Kings in Grass Castles is a 1959 book of history by Dame Mary Durack (1913–1994). The book is considered a classic of Australian literature.

It is the story of Durack's pioneering family establishing its pastoral interests in the Australian outback during the 19th century and concerns the life and times of Durack's grandfather Patrick Durack, an Irish immigrant who became a leader of the overlanders who brought their cattle on hoof to south west Queensland and then later to the tropical north of Western Australia. The book was notable for its portrayal of the role of women and families in the pastoral industry and collaboration and respect between the pastoralists and local Aboriginal peoples.

Durack published a sequel, Sons in the Saddle, in 1983.

== TV miniseries ==
Kings in Grass Castles was made into a TV miniseries in 1998.

=== Cast ===
- Ritchie Singer as Sam Emmanuel
- Ernie Dingo as Jimmy
- Essie Davis as Mary Costello
- David Ngoombujarra as Burrakin
- Stephen Dillane as Patsy
- Susan Lynch as Sarah
- Max Cullen as Mr Costello
- Brian Rooney as JW (aged 19)
- Trevor Jamieson as Boontamurra Youth
- Wayne Scott Kermond as Stumpy Michael
