= Riddick House =

Riddick House may refer to:

- Hoffman-Bowers-Josey-Riddick House, Scotland Neck, NC, listed on the NRHP in North Carolina
- Riddick House (Como, North Carolina), listed on the NRHP in North Carolina
- Riddick House (Suffolk, Virginia), listed on the NRHP in Virginia
