= Lake Moodemere =

- Town
- Coordinates: 36.056°S 146.388°E
- Country: Australia
- State: Victoria
- LGA: Shire of Indigo
- Postcode: 3685

Lake Moodemere is a locality in north eastern Victoria near Wahgunyah on the Murray River. The locality is on the Murray Valley Highway, 233 kilometres (145 mi) north of the state capital, Melbourne.

Moodemere is believed to be an Aboriginal word for ‘water hole that never dries up’.

The lake is host to the Lake Moodemere rowing regatta each year in January. It is the oldest continually run regatta in Australia with the first event held in 1863.
