= K. Langloh Parker =

Australian writer, collector of Aboriginal legends (1856–1940)

K. Langloh Parker; Catherine Eliza Somerville Stow
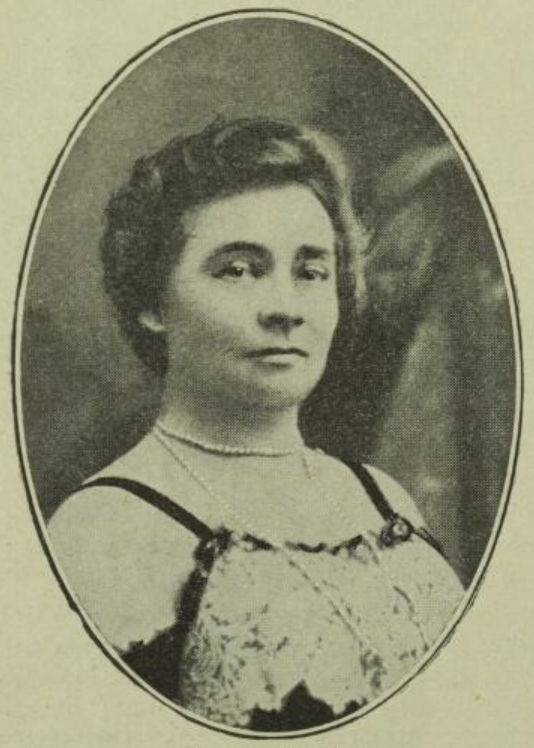
- Parker in 1912
- Born: Catherine Eliza Somerville Field; 1 May 1856; Encounter Bay, South Australia
- Died: 27 March 1940 (aged 83); Glenelg, South Australia
- Spouse(s): Langloh Parker and Percival Randolph Stow
- Parent(s): Henry Field (1818–1909) and Sophia née Newland (1829–1872)
- Relatives: Ridgway Newland (grandfather), Randolph Isham Stow (father-in-law), William George Field (uncle)
- Writing career
- Pen name: K. Langloh Parker
- Language: English
- Years active: 1898-1940
- Notable work: Australian Legendary Tales
- Notable awards: Children's Book of the Year Award: Older Readers 1954

Australian Legendary Tales – folk-lore of the Noongahburrahs as told to the picaninnies (1896), collected by K. Langloh Parker

Catherine Eliza Somerville Stow (1 May 1856 – 27 March 1940), who wrote as K. Langloh Parker, was a South Australian born writer who lived in northern New South Wales in the late nineteenth century. She is best known for recording the stories of the Ualarai around her. Her testimony is one of the best accounts of the beliefs and stories of an Aboriginal people in north-west New South Wales at that time. However, her accounts reflect European attitudes of the time.

== Early life ==
Parker was born Catherine Eliza Somerville Field at Encounter Bay, in South Australia, daughter of Henry Field, pastoralist, and his wife Sophia, daughter of Rev. Ridgway Newland. Henry Field established Marra station near Wilcannia on the Darling River in New South Wales, and 'Katie' was raised there. The relocation brought the family both prosperity and sorrows. In an incident that took place in January 1862, her sisters Jane and Henrietta drowned while Katie was rescued by her Ualarai nurse, Miola. In recognition, Miola was taken in to be schooled together with the Fields' other children. The family moved back to Adelaide in 1872.

== Marriage ==
In 1875, on reaching her maturity at 18, she married her first husband, Langloh Parker, 16 years her senior. In 1879 they moved to his property, Bangate Station, near Angledool, on Ualarai lands by the Narran River. Langloh Parker's holdings consisted of 215,000 acres (87,000 ha) running some 100,000 sheep and cattle. He found time also to work as magistrate at Walgett. Over the following two decades she collected many of the Ualarai stories and legends which were to fill her books and make her famous. After drought struck the region, the station eventually failed and the Parkers moved to Sydney in 1901, where Langloh was diagnosed with cancer, dying two years later. Katie travelled to England and married a lawyer, Percival Randolph Stow (son of Randolph Isham Stow), in 1905. The couple eventually returned to Australia, taking up residence in the suburb of Glenelg in Adelaide until her death in 1940.

== Ethnographical work ==
Katie Parker had a fair degree of fluency in Ualarai. But her scruples over accurate reportage led her to inquire among, and converse with, her informants by adopting a technique to control against errors. She would elicit material on a legend from an elder, then get the English version retranslated back by a native more fluent in English than the elders, in order to enable the latter to correct any errors that might have arisen. The interpreter would then translate the revised version, which she would write down, and then have the written account read back to the elderly informant for final confirmation of its accuracy.

Her first foray in ethnography, Australian Legendary Tales: folklore of the Noongahburrahs as told to the Piccaninnies, appeared in 1896 as one of a series dealing with 'Fairy Tales of the British Empire'. She followed this on two years later with More Australian Legendary Tales. The Scottish writer and anthropologist Andrew Lang had provided prefaces to both works, and it was perhaps on his advice and encouragement that she eventually wrote the classic for which she is best known, The Euahlayi Tribe: A study of Aboriginal life in Australia, which came out in 1905. This, as generally her earlier books, were well received by the relevant scholarly community at the time: reviews commended her direct transmission of what elders had told her, unadorned by imaginative additions.

Reflecting on the use to which her ethnography had been put, she expressed a lively wariness about how aboriginal material can be reworked to fit some modern theory, under the misapprehension that the scholar thereby evinces a 'detachment' from the immediate world of his study's distant subjects, as when she remarked perceptively, as Evans notes, observed that:

I dare say little with an air of finality about black people; I have lived too much with them for that. To be positive, you should never spend more than six months in their neighbourhood; in fact, if you want to keep your anthropological ideas quite firm, it is safer to let the blacks remain in inland Australia while you stay a few thousand miles away. Otherwise, your preconceived notions are almost sure to totter to their foundations; and nothing is more annoying than to have elaborately built-up, delightfully logical theories, played ninepins with by an old greybeard of a black, who apparently objects to his beliefs being classified, docketed, and pigeon-holed, until he has had his say.

She concludes by expressing her sympathy with Montaigne's criticism of European man's sense of being more enlightened than savages, when we ourselves boast of laws that putatively reflect nature rather than being themselves the outcome of custom. Missionaries among the Aborigines failed to realize that the natives whom they tried to convert from their 'customs' hewed far more closely to their laws than Christians do, and missionaries were as much victims of their own customs as the native flock among whom they proselytized were of theirs.

Her books nonetheless went out of print, and only in recent decades has her work been retrieved and examined, either critically as embodying the flaws of colonial ethnography, or as an early example of feminist approaches in anthropology.

== Other works ==
Parker wrote several other minor works, including a cookery book (Kookaburra Cookery Book, 1911) which proved very popular; Walkabouts of Wur-run-nah(1918) and Woggheeguy: Australian Aboriginal Legends(1930). Her reminiscences of life at Bangate, My Bush Book, was only published posthumously, edited by her biographer, Marcie Muir.

== Sources ==
- Evans, Julie (2011). Founders, Firsts and Feminists: Women Leaders in Twentieth-century Australia (PDF). eScholarship Research Centre, University of Melbourne. pp. 13–26.
- Muir, Marcie (1990). Catherine Eliza (Katie) Stow (1856–1940). Australian Dictionary of Biography. Vol. 12. National Centre of Biography, Australian National University.
- "Obituaries of the Week: Henry Field (1818–1909)". Observer. Vol. LXVI, no. 3, 515. South Australia. 13 February 1909.
- K. Langloh Parker (1896), Australian Legendary Tales: Folklore of the Noongahburrahs as told to the Piccaninnies, Illustrator: Tommy McRae, Melbourne, London: David Nutt, Wikidata Q21120338
- K. Langloh Parker (1898), More Australian Legendary Tales, Illustrator: Tommy McRae, London, Melbourne: David Nutt, Wikidata Q21120391
- K. Langloh Parker (1905), The Euahlayi Tribe: A Study of Aboriginal Life in Australia, London: Archibald Constable, Wikidata Q19086199
- Parker, K. Langloh; Lang, Andrew (December 1898). "Australian Religion". Folklore. 10 (4): 489–495. JSTOR 1253370.
- Parker, K. Langloh; Muir, Marcie (1982). My Bush Book: K. Langloh Parker's 1890s Story of Outback Station Life, with Background and Biography. Rigby. ISBN 978-0-727-01734-5.
- Rendell, Alan (1967). "Ridgway William Newland (1790–1864)". Newland, Ridgway William (1790–1864). Australian Dictionary of Biography. Vol. 2. National Centre of Biography, Australian National University.
