= Redick =

Redick is a surname. Notable people with the surname include:

- Cornelius Redick (born 1964), American football player
- David Redick (died 1805), American surveyor, lawyer, and politician
- Hazel Redick-Smith (born 1926), South African tennis player
- JJ Redick (born 1984), American basketball player
- John I. Redick (1828–1906), American lawyer, judge, and banker
- Lia Redick (born 2009), Canadian artistic gymnast
- Robert V.S. Redick (born 1967), American author

== See also ==
- Reddick (surname)
- Readick
- Riddick (disambiguation)
