= Readick =

Readick is a surname. Notable people with the surname include:

- Bob Readick (1925–1985), American actor
- Frank Readick (1896–1965), American actor

== See also ==
- Reddick (surname)
- Redick
- Riddick (disambiguation)
