= Mary Ruddock =

New Zealand businesswoman (1895–1969)

- Born: 2 April 1895; Hastings, England
- Died: 27 June 1969 (aged 74); Wellington, New Zealand
- Occupation(s): Clothes designer and business owner

Mary Ruddock (2 April 1895 – 27 June 1969) was a New Zealand businesswoman who ran a dressmaking business in Wellington from the 1930s to the 1960s.

== Early life ==
Ruddock was born in Hastings, England, on 2 April 1895, one of eight children born to the Reverend David and Anne (née Lush).

When Ruddock was eight, the family moved to Wairoa, New Zealand, and her father became Archdeacon of Hawke's Bay in 1907. After her father died in 1920, her mother moved the family to Parnell, Auckland, where they lived in Anne Ruddock's parents' home, historic Ewelme Cottage.

Ruddock attended St Margaret's College, Christchurch and received awards in botany, needlework and class work. She also began to play the violin while at the school.

Ruddock lost both of her brothers in World War I: Edward died in 1915 and Walter in 1917.

In 1921, Ruddock went to England to study music at the Guildhall School of Music and Drama. On her return to New Zealand, she advertised in the Auckland papers as a violin tutor.

== Career ==
In 1931 Ruddock moved to Wellington and established a dressmaking business called "Mary Ruddock Ltd" specializing in children's clothes. She designed the clothes and a team of seamstresses sewed them, with Ruddock checking every item before it left the workroom. The shop was initially located in Molesworth Street, and later moved to Vickers House in Woodward Street.

The business went into voluntary liquidation in 1942 but re-opened in 1945 in premises on Lambton Quay. In the 1950s Ruddock branched out into women's clothes, and one of her customers was her old school friend from Christchurch, Ngaio Marsh. She also provided clothes for the children of Sir Willoughby Norrie, the Governor-General of New Zealand at that time.

In 1963, Mary Ruddock Ltd ceased trading and Ruddock died in Wellington in 1969 at the age of 74.
