= Roddick =

Roddick is a surname. Notable people with the surname include:

== Surname ==
- Andy Roddick (born 1982), American tennis player
- Dame Anita Roddick (1942–2007), British entrepreneur and environmentalist
- Sir (Thomas) Gordon Roddick (born 1942), British activist, philanthropist, and environmentalist
- Sam Roddick (born 1971), British businesswoman, daughter of Anita and Gordon Roddick
- Thomas George Roddick (1846–1923), Canadian surgeon, medical administrator, and politician
- Val Roddick, Canadian politician

== See also ==
- Federer–Roddick rivalry, a rivalry between two professional tennis players, Roger Federer of Switzerland and Andy Roddick of the United States
- Roddick Gates, also Roddick Memorial Gates, are monumental gates in Montreal that serve as the main entrance to the McGill University campus
