= Riddick =

Riddick may refer to:

== Entertainment ==
- Riddick (film), a 2013 film
  - Riddick (character), protagonist of The Chronicles of Riddick franchise

== Places ==
- Riddick House (disambiguation), three houses on the US National Register of Historic Places
- Riddick Stadium, former home of the North Carolina State University football team, US

== People with the given name ==
- Riddick Bowe (born 1967), American boxer
- Riddick Parker (1972–2022), American football player

== People with the surname ==
- Andre Riddick (born 1973), American basketball player
- Carl W. Riddick (1872–1960), American politician from Montana
- Floyd M. Riddick (1908–2000), American politician
- Gordon Riddick (1943–2018), English football player
- Graham Riddick (born 1955), British politician
- Joseph Riddick (1735–1818), American politician from North Carolina
- Kathleen Riddick (1907–1973), British conductor and cellist
- Louis Riddick (born 1969), American football player
- Makeba Riddick, American singer songwriter
- Ray Riddick (1917–1976), American football player
- Robb Riddick (born 1957), American football player
- Steve Riddick (born 1951), American sprinter
- Theo Riddick (born 1991), American football player
- W. C. Riddick (1864–1942), American football coach and college administrator
- Walter Garrett Riddick (1883–1953), American judge

== See also ==
- Readick (surname)
- Redick (surname)
- Reddick (disambiguation)
