= Sortable list of islands of Western Australia =

This sortable list of islands of Western Australia includes all coastal and inland islands, cays, isles and islets. It also includes named island groups, archipelagos and island clumps.

This list is complete with respect to the 1996 Gazetteer of Australia. Dubious names have been checked against the online 2004 data, and in all cases confirmed correct. However, if any islands have been gazetted or deleted since 1996, this list does not reflect these changes. Strictly speaking, Australian place names are gazetted in capital letters only; the names in this list have been converted to mixed case in accordance with normal capitalisation conventions. Locations are as gazetted; some islands may extend over large areas.

#	Name	Coords	Locality	Region	Notes
1	1 Island (Houtman Abrolhos)	28°54′34″S 113°52′55″E	Houtman Abrolhos	Mid West	
2	2 Island	28°54′34″S 113°52′42″E	Houtman Abrolhos	Mid West	
3	3 Island	28°54′24″S 113°52′16″E	Houtman Abrolhos	Mid West	
4	4 Island (Sweet Island)	28°55′01″S 113°52′17″E	Houtman Abrolhos	Mid West	
5	5 Island (Davis Island (Houtman Abrolhos))	28°54′53″S 113°52′33″E	Houtman Abrolhos	Mid West	
6	6 Island (Sid Liddon Island)	28°54′40″S 113°51′49″E	Houtman Abrolhos	Mid West	
7	6 Mile Island	33°38′23″S 123°57′57″E		Great Southern	Israelite Bay
8	7 Island	28°54′22″S 113°51′21″E	Houtman Abrolhos	Mid West	
9	8 Island	28°53′56″S 113°51′36″E	Houtman Abrolhos	Mid West	
10	Abutilon Island	20°40′05″S 115°34′44″E	Lowendal Islands	Pilbara	
11	Acasta Island	14°10′26″S 125°40′18″E		Kimberley	
12	Adele Island (Western Australia)	15°31′25″S 123°09′16″E		Kimberley	
13	Admiral Island (Western Australia)	16°04′00″S 123°24′06″E	Buccaneer Archipelago	Kimberley	
14	Adolphus Island	15°06′45″S 128°08′36″E		Kimberley	
15	Advance Island	16°09′19″S 123°55′46″E			
16	Ah Chong Island	20°31′30″S 115°32′30″E	Montebello Islands	Pilbara	
17	Airlie Island	21°19′26″S 115°09′55″E		Pilbara	
18	Akerstrom Island	28°28′30″S 113°41′51″E	Houtman Abrolhos	Mid West	
19	Albert Islands	14°31′07″S 124°55′30″E			
20	Alcatraz Island (Houtman Abrolhos)	28°27′43″S 113°43′18″E	Houtman Abrolhos	Mid West	
21	Alexander Island (Collie River)	33°18′44″S 115°42′03″E	Bunbury, Western Australia		
22	Alexander Island (Fitzroy River)	18°23′56″S 125°21′57″E		Kimberley	
23	Alexander Island (Houtman Abrolhos)	28°40′26″S 113°49′44″E	Easter Group	Mid West	
24	Allora Island	16°24′57″S 123°09′18″E			
25	Alma Islands	23°56′51″S 115°47′27″E			
26	Alpha Island (Western Australia)	20°24′39″S 115°31′15″E	Montebello Islands	Pilbara	
27	Amethyst Island	16°18′34″S 128°38′48″E			
28	Anderdon Islands	14°55′55″S 125°10′23″E		Kimberley	
29	Angel Island (Western Australia)	20°29′15″S 116°48′28″E			
30	Angle Island	21°04′48″S 115°49′30″E		Pilbara	
31	Anglesea Island	33°19′35″S 115°39′12″E			
32	Ant Island	26°09′47″S 113°26′32″E	Shark Bay	Gascoyne	
33	Anvil Island (Western Australia)	33°44′17″S 124°05′39″E	Recherche Archipelago		
34	Apex Island	16°23′52″S 123°03′17″E			
35	Arbidej Island	16°12′04″S 123°32′32″E			
36	Archdeacon Island	34°07′16″S 123°03′57″E			
37	Archipelago of the Recherche	34°12′14″S 122°20′54″E	Recherche Archipelago		
38	Arid Island	34°01′27″S 123°09′31″E			
39	Arthur Island (Houtman Abrolhos)	28°53′55″S 114°00′12″E	Houtman Abrolhos	Mid West	
40	Ashburton Island	21°35′33″S 114°56′02″E			
41	Asshlyn Islands	16°07′58″S 123°17′19″E			
42	Aster Island	20°25′52″S 115°34′38″E	Montebello Islands	Pilbara	
43	Atrina Island	15°13′54″S 124°29′35″E			
44	Attack Island	15°48′34″S 124°42′29″E			
45	Atys Island	15°14′15″S 124°31′02″E			
46	Augereau Island	14°45′22″S 125°07′43″E			
47	Augustus Island (Western Australia)	15°20′38″S 124°32′12″E	Bonaparte Archipelago	Kimberley	
48	Augustus Springs Island	24°16′55″S 116°52′35″E	Mount Augustus National Park		
49	Aunt Island	14°22′25″S 127°50′22″E			
50	Auriferous Island	29°07′05″S 119°38′08″E			
51	Aveling Island	16°20′34″S 123°36′46″E			
52	Avocet Island	32°36′27″S 115°38′46″E			
53	Babbage Island	24°52′39″S 113°37′57″E	Shark Bay	Gascoyne	Named after Charles Babbage
54	Bailey Island (Western Australia)	26°54′29″S 118°19′44″E			
55	Bald Island (Broke Inlet)	34°56′36″S 116°29′00″E			
56	Bald Island	34°55′05″S 118°27′44″E		Great Southern	
57	Ballee Island	32°34′59″S 115°46′08″E			
58	Bar Island (Western Australia)	33°18′07″S 115°41′17″E			
59	Barbecue Island	16°08′53″S 128°42′01″E			
60	Barely Island	33°57′07″S 122°30′06″E			
61	Barge Rock	28°27′02″S 113°43′17″E	Houtman Abrolhos	Mid West	
62	Barnes Island (Western Australia)	15°11′38″S 128°10′16″E			
63	Barnicoat Island	16°27′39″S 123°25′50″E		Kimberley	
64	Barrier Island (Western Australia)	33°58′48″S 123°08′13″E	Recherche Archipelago		
65	Barrow Island (Western Australia)	20°47′56″S 115°24′17″E		Pilbara	
66	Basile Island	28°52′33″S 113°57′38″E	Houtman Abrolhos	Mid West	
67	Bat Island	15°06′22″S 124°54′25″E			
68	Bathurst Island (Western Australia)	16°02′41″S 123°31′57″E	Buccaneer Archipelago	Kimberley	
69	Baudin Island (Kimberley coast)	14°07′44″S 125°36′12″E		Kimberley	
70	Baudin Island (Shark Bay)	26°30′54″S 113°38′55″E	Shark Bay	Gascoyne	
71	Bayliss Islands	16°12′59″S 123°29′29″E			
72	Beacon Island (Houtman Abrolhos)	28°28′35″S 113°47′02″E	Wallabi Group	Mid West	
73	Beagle Islands (Western Australia)	29°48′30″S 114°52′31″E			
74	Beaumont Island (Western Australia)	34°05′27″S 122°32′20″E			
75	Bedford Islands	16°09′29″S 123°20′11″E	Buccaneer Archipelago	Kimberley	
76	Bedout Island	19°35′20″S 119°05′49″E		Pilbara	
77	Bedwell Island	17°18′59″S 119°20′29″E			
78	Beelu Island	24°56′40″S 115°53′39″E	Kennedy Range National Park		Thomas River
79	Bellinger Island	33°53′16″S 123°38′15″E			
80	Ben Island	33°54′00″S 122°45′13″E	Recherche Archipelago		
81	Bend Island	25°03′47″S 115°26′29″E	Kennedy Range National Park		Gascoyne River
82	Bernier Island	24°50′57″S 113°08′14″E	Shark Bay	Gascoyne	
83	Bernouilli Island	15°01′33″S 124°46′38″E	Timor Sea		
84	Berthier Island	14°30′32″S 124°59′24″E		Kimberley	
85	Berthoud Island	14°16′51″S 125°50′17″E			
86	Bessieres Island	21°31′33″S 114°45′40″E		Pilbara	
87	Bezout Island	20°33′13″S 117°10′29″E			
88	Big Island (Western Australia)	24°07′39″S 115°31′14″E	Kennedy Range National Park		Lyons River
89	Bigge Island	14°35′20″S 125°09′11″E		Kimberley	
90	Bignell Island	14°29′41″S 125°55′35″E			
91	Bird Island (Western Australia)	14°00′54″S 126°34′01″E		Kimberley	
92	Bird Island (Western Australia)	14°05′07″S 125°42′41″E		Kimberley	
93	Bird Island (Western Australia)	32°16′42″S 115°41′17″E		Perth region	
94	Bishop Island (Western Australia)	14°24′26″S 125°20′19″E			
95	Black Island (Western Australia)	33°55′12″S 121°59′31″E			
96	Bluebell Island	20°23′54″S 115°31′08″E	Montebello Islands	Pilbara	
97	Bonaparte Archipelago	14°31′07″S 124°55′30″E	Bonaparte Archipelago	Kimberley	
98	Bonaparte Island	14°51′21″S 124°46′02″E		Kimberley	
	Booby Island (Kimberley) (White Island)	15°03′41″S 124°19′35″E	Bonaparte Archipelago	Kimberley	
99	Boodalan Island	32°35′37″S 115°44′53″E			
100	Boodie Island	20°57′46″S 115°19′33″E			
101	Boomerang Island	20°44′10″S 115°28′45″E		Pilbara	Barrow Island
102	Boongaree Island	15°05′14″S 125°11′56″E			
103	Boora Island	24°45′25″S 114°11′45″E	Kennedy Range National Park		Gascoyne River
104	Borda Island	14°14′12″S 126°01′14″E			
105	Boullanger Island	30°19′09″S 114°59′55″E		Mid West	Named after Charles-Pierre Boullanger
106	Boundary Island (Western Australia)	32°34′15″S 115°42′38″E	Peel Inlet (Mandurah)		
107	Boxer Island	34°00′03″S 121°40′35″E			
108	Branch Island	14°25′59″S 125°17′06″E			
109	Breaksea Island (Western Australia)	35°03′50″S 118°03′09″E		Great Southern	
110	Brewis Island (Western Australia)	34°04′22″S 123°04′08″E			
111	Bridled Island	20°38′23″S 115°33′22″E	Lowendal Islands	Pilbara	
112	Brigadier Island	20°26′41″S 116°36′55″E			
113	Brooke Island	20°26′06″S 115°30′05″E	Montebello Islands	Pilbara	
114	Broughton Island (Western Australia)	33°58′53″S 122°25′58″E			
115	Brown Island (Western Australia)	21°53′11″S 114°33′32″E			
116	Browne Island (Western Australia)	15°08′04″S 124°30′09″E			
117	Browse Island	14°06′35″S 123°32′53″E		Kimberley	
118	Bruen Island	16°04′00″S 123°22′45″E	Buccaneer Archipelago	Kimberley	
119	Brunswick Island	32°45′01″S 115°42′13″E			
120	Buccaneer Archipelago	16°05′57″S 123°25′47″E	Buccaneer Archipelago	Kimberley	
121	Buffon Island	14°55′04″S 124°44′17″E			
122	Bullanyin Island	16°13′33″S 128°43′21″E			
123	Buller Island	30°39′26″S 115°06′47″E			
124	Bumpus Island	15°30′27″S 124°24′08″E			
125	Burnett Island (Houtman Abrolhos)	28°52′22″S 113°57′47″E	Houtman Abrolhos	Mid West	
126	Burnside Island	22°06′21″S 114°30′31″E		Pilbara	
127	Burton Island (Houtman Abrolhos)	28°51′59″S 113°59′06″E	Houtman Abrolhos	Mid West	
128	Bushby Island	28°43′25″S 113°47′07″E	Houtman Abrolhos	Mid West	
129	Buttercup Island	20°29′10″S 115°32′02″E	Montebello Islands	Pilbara	
130	Button Island (Western Australia)	33°54′13″S 121°53′20″E			
131	Byam Martin Island (Western Australia)	15°22′52″S 124°21′19″E			
132	Bynoe Island	28°39′54″S 113°52′31″E	Houtman Abrolhos	Mid West	
133	Byron Island (Buccaneer Archipelago)	16°09′45″S 123°26′55″E	Buccaneer Archipelago	Kimberley	
134	Caesar Island	16°03′54″S 123°55′54″E			
135	Caffarelli Island	16°02′26″S 123°17′22″E	Buccaneer Archipelago	Kimberley	
136	Camp Island (Western Australia)	24°41′46″S 115°19′05″E	Kennedy Range National Park		Lyons River
137	Campbell Island (Houtman Abrolhos)	28°41′44″S 113°50′05″E	Houtman Abrolhos	Mid West	
138	Campbell Island (Western Australia)	20°25′45″S 115°32′35″E	Montebello Islands	Pilbara	
139	Campbell-Taylor Group	33°58′14″S 122°53′58″E			
140	Canard Island	33°59′36″S 122°01′15″E			
141	Canning Island	33°55′05″S 121°46′20″E			
142	Cap Island (Western Australia)	33°58′39″S 122°56′11″E			
143	Capps Island	33°59′19″S 121°40′50″E			
144	Capstan Island	14°35′00″S 125°16′08″E			
145	Careening Island	15°30′03″S 124°35′46″E			
146	Carey Island (Western Australia)	20°57′04″S 116°10′28″E		Pilbara	
147	Carlia Island	14°22′19″S 125°59′06″E			
148	Carnac Island	32°07′30″S 115°39′46″E		Perth region	
149	Carnation Island	20°22′45″S 115°31′19″E	Montebello Islands	Pilbara	
150	Carronade Island	13°56′42″S 126°36′09″E		Kimberley	
	Cartier Island (Ashmore and Cartier Islands)	12°31′00″S 123°33′00″E	Ashmore Reef		
151	Cassini Island	13°56′50″S 125°37′41″E			
152	Casuarina Isles	35°03′24″S 116°41′43″E			
153	Caswell Island	14°28′12″S 125°11′54″E			
154	Cave Island (Western Australia)	33°58′44″S 122°49′06″E			
155	Cecelia Islands	16°20′15″S 123°34′26″E			
156	Cecilia Islands	16°19′59″S 123°33′47″E			
157	Cervantes Islands	30°31′25″S 115°02′40″E			
158	Chambers Island (Western Australia)	16°16′14″S 123°31′59″E			
159	Champagny Island	15°18′01″S 124°15′59″E			
160	Champagny Islands	15°19′20″S 124°13′12″E			
161	Championet Island	14°30′09″S 125°06′13″E			
162	Channel Island (Western Australia)	32°33′52″S 115°43′05″E			
163	Channel Islands (Western Australia)	20°39′28″S 116°41′39″E			
164	Charley Island	33°55′23″S 121°52′31″E			
165	Charlie Island	26°22′03″S 113°34′07″E	Shark Bay	Gascoyne	
166	Chatham Island (Western Australia)	35°01′47″S 116°29′43″E		Great Southern	
167	Cheriton Island	16°30′21″S 123°24′43″E			
168	Cherry Island (Western Australia)	32°11′32″S 121°44′06″E			
169	Cheyne Island	34°36′18″S 118°45′00″E			
170	Chinyin Island	16°07′26″S 128°45′03″E			
171	Christmas Island	10°29′01″S 105°37′16″E			
172	Claret Islands	15°41′39″S 124°22′50″E		Kimberley	
173	Clark Island (Western Australia)	34°56′38″S 116°29′37″E			
174	Clarke Islands	16°23′39″S 123°18′46″E			
175	Cleft Island (Western Australia)	16°02′16″S 123°21′01″E	Buccaneer Archipelago	Kimberley	
176	Cleghorn Island	14°22′01″S 125°24′11″E			
177	Clerk Island	14°23′46″S 125°19′05″E			
178	Cliff Island (Western Australia)	34°01′06″S 122°05′10″E			
179	Cloud Island	34°02′42″S 122°05′15″E			
180	Cockatoo Island (Western Australia)	16°05′55″S 123°37′00″E	Buccaneer Archipelago	Kimberley	
181	Cocos (Keeling) Islands	12°10′01″S 096°49′18″E	Cocos (Keeling) Islands		
182	Coffin Island	35°00′07″S 118°12′46″E		Great Southern	
183	Cohen Island	20°23′14″S 116°48′15″E		Pilbara	
184	Colbert Island	14°52′05″S 124°43′02″E			
185	Combe Hill Island	14°30′11″S 125°20′19″E			
186	Combe Island	14°26′20″S 125°01′49″E			
187	Commerson Island	15°09′12″S 124°39′31″E			
188	Condillac Island	14°06′22″S 125°33′21″E			
189	Conilurus Island	16°09′21″S 123°35′03″E			
190	Conway Island (Western Australia)	15°52′05″S 123°40′16″E			
191	Conzinc Island	20°32′27″S 116°46′32″E			
192	Cooleenup Island	32°34′37″S 115°46′16″E			
193	Cooper Island (Western Australia)	34°13′57″S 123°36′18″E	Recherche Archipelago		
194	Coorothoo Island	24°17′54″S 115°32′28″E	Kennedy Range National Park		Lyons River
195	Corbett Island	34°07′07″S 121°58′33″E			
196	Cormorant Island (Western Australia)	20°45′14″S 115°29′21″E		Pilbara	Barrow Island
197	Corneille Island	14°11′07″S 125°43′57″E			
198	Cornwall Island (Western Australia)	34°00′17″S 122°32′18″E			
199	Coronation Island (Houtman Abrolhos)	28°52′14″S 113°59′07″E	Houtman Abrolhos	Mid West	
200	Coronation Island (Western Australia)	14°58′46″S 124°55′28″E			
201	Coronation Islands	14°58′13″S 124°55′28″E			
202	Corvisart Island	14°31′59″S 125°00′38″E			
203	Cotton Island	14°54′25″S 124°43′25″E			
204	Cowle Island	21°13′50″S 115°46′38″E			
205	Crabbe Island	15°58′32″S 123°41′25″E			
206	Crake Island	28°44′31″S 113°48′57″E	Houtman Abrolhos	Mid West	
207	Cranny Island	33°43′50″S 124°04′39″E			
208	Creak Island	33°56′52″S 122°42′53″E			
209	Creery Island	32°33′53″S 115°43′24″E			
210	Crocus Island	20°25′22″S 115°31′25″E	Montebello Islands	Pilbara	
211	Crusoe Island	34°59′13″S 117°25′37″E			
212	Cull Island	33°55′22″S 121°54′07″E			
213	Cunningham Island (Western Australia)	17°34′59″S 118°55′59″E			
214	Cuppup Island	35°00′01″S 117°28′23″E			
215	Cussen Island	16°23′44″S 123°28′01″E			
216	Cymo Island	15°15′10″S 124°25′24″E			
217	D'Aguesseau Island	15°09′50″S 124°32′48″E			
218	Dahlia Island	20°25′48″S 115°34′38″E	Montebello Islands	Pilbara	
219	Dailey Island	34°04′34″S 123°07′31″E			
220	Daisy Island	20°26′25″S 115°34′44″E	Montebello Islands	Pilbara	
221	Dakin Island	28°28′37″S 113°48′25″E	Houtman Abrolhos	Mid West	
222	Dalgety Island	25°07′32″S 115°45′17″E	Kennedy Range National Park		Thomas River
223	Dampier Archipelago	20°22′42″S 116°52′23″E	Dampier Archipelago		
224	Dampiers Monument	16°07′36″S 123°26′21″E			
225	Dandelion Island	20°25′59″S 115°34′41″E	Montebello Islands	Pilbara	
226	D'Arcole Islands	14°54′46″S 124°40′56″E			
227	Darcy Island	15°20′33″S 124°23′32″E		Kimberley	
228	Davis Island (Houtman Abrolhos) (5 Island)	28°54′53″S 113°52′33″E	Houtman Abrolhos	Mid West	
229	Davis Island (Western Australia)	24°54′41″S 115°16′18″E	Kennedy Range National Park		Gascoyne River
230	Davy Island	34°08′09″S 121°55′58″E			
231	Daw Island	33°50′55″S 124°08′04″E			
232	De Freycinet Islet	14°59′23″S 124°31′59″E			
233	Dean Island (Western Australia)	16°23′20″S 123°07′10″E			
234	Degerando Island	15°20′13″S 124°11′31″E		Kimberley	
235	Delambre Island	20°26′52″S 117°04′36″E			
236	Delta Island (Western Australia)	20°26′37″S 115°32′47″E	Montebello Islands	Pilbara	
237	Dempsey Island	16°30′25″S 123°25′06″E			
238	Depuch Island	20°37′54″S 117°43′27″E		Pilbara	
239	Desaix Islands	14°53′41″S 124°53′02″E			
240	Descartes Island (Western Australia)	14°10′04″S 125°40′37″E			
241	Desfontaines Island	15°01′21″S 124°51′09″E			
242	Diamond Island (Western Australia)	31°21′04″S 115°31′44″E			
243	Dick Island	34°16′45″S 115°11′07″E			
244	Dicks Island	28°29′51″S 113°45′56″E	Houtman Abrolhos	Mid West	
245	Direction Island (Cocos (Keeling) Islands)	12°05′16″S 096°52′55″E	Cocos (Keeling) Islands		
246	Direction Island (Exmouth Gulf)	21°32′06″S 115°07′42″E		Pilbara	
247	Direction Island (Kimberley coast)	16°25′40″S 123°08′56″E		Kimberley	
248	Dirk Hartog Island	25°50′36″S 113°03′18″E	Shark Bay	Gascoyne	
249	Disappearing Island (Houtman Abrolhos)	28°47′03″S 113°44′23″E	Houtman Abrolhos	Mid West	
250	Diver Island	28°52′02″S 113°58′20″E	Houtman Abrolhos	Mid West	
251	Dixon Island (Western Australia)	20°37′35″S 117°03′45″E			
252	Djarumu Island	15°19′20″S 124°13′25″E			
253	Dolphin Island (Western Australia)	20°29′43″S 116°51′09″E	Dampier Archipelago		
254	Dome Island (Western Australia)	34°09′54″S 123°20′37″E			
255	Don Island	14°16′03″S 125°19′00″E			
256	Doole Island	22°28′23″S 114°09′43″E			
257	Doris Island	16°18′13″S 123°17′33″E			
258	Dorney Island	16°16′48″S 123°24′58″E			
259	Dorothy Island	16°09′11″S 123°31′51″E			
260	Dorre Island	25°03′26″S 113°06′04″E	Shark Bay	Gascoyne	
261	Dot Island (Western Australia)	20°26′13″S 115°34′43″E	Montebello Islands	Pilbara	
262	Double Island (Shark Bay)	26°24′57″S 113°36′59″E	Shark Bay	Gascoyne	
263	Double Island (Western Australia)	20°44′40″S 115°29′30″E			
264	Double Island (Western Australia)	24°40′38″S 116°11′39″E	Kennedy Range National Park		Thomas River
265	Doubtful Islands	34°22′36″S 119°34′38″E			
266	Douglas Island (Western Australia)	34°09′53″S 123°08′22″E			
267	Dove Island (Western Australia)	16°29′46″S 123°22′21″E			
268	Downes Island	20°18′50″S 118°30′46″E		Pilbara	Near Port Hedland
269	Draper Island (Western Australia)	34°11′48″S 122°29′39″E			
270	Dry Island	28°44′22″S 113°46′43″E	Houtman Abrolhos	Mid West	
271	Duguesclin Island	15°06′48″S 124°31′53″E			
272	Dunvert Island	16°17′20″S 123°30′52″E			
273	Dyer Island (Western Australia)	32°01′11″S 115°32′56″E			
274	Eagle Island (Shark Bay)	26°05′40″S 113°34′30″E	Shark Bay	Gascoyne	
275	Eaglehawk Island	20°39′30″S 116°26′34″E		Pilbara	
276	East Governor Island	13°56′45″S 126°42′15″E			
277	East Intercourse Island	20°39′16″S 116°40′58″E			
278	East Island (Ashmore and Cartier Islands)	12°15′00″S 123°05′00″E	Ashmore Reef		
279	East Island (Lacepede Islands)	16°54′09″S 122°11′45″E	Lacepede Islands	Kimberley	Site of the East Island Lighthouse
280	East Island (Mary Anne Group)	21°16′30″S 115°35′44″E	Mary Anne Group.		
281	East Lewis Island	20°36′33″S 116°39′32″E			
282	East Lyons Island	25°02′19″S 115°09′24″E	Kennedy Range National Park		Gascoyne Junction
283	East Mid Intercourse Island	20°40′05″S 116°39′59″E			
284	East Montalivet Island	14°16′49″S 125°17′54″E		Kimberley	
285	East Moore Island	20°38′20″S 117°41′23″E			
286	East Roe Island	16°22′08″S 123°13′28″E			
287	East Sunday Island	16°24′41″S 123°12′37″E			
288	East Wallabi Island	28°26′23″S 113°43′33″E	Wallabi Group	Mid West	
289	Easter Group	28°44′12″S 113°46′09″E	Houtman Abrolhos	Mid West	
290	Eastern Group (Western Australia)	33°43′59″S 124°05′58″E			
291	Eastern Island (Houtman Abrolhos)	28°27′55″S 113°48′42″E	Houtman Abrolhos	Mid West	
292	Eastern Islands	28°40′17″S 113°52′11″E			
293	Eclipse Hill Island	13°56′30″S 126°17′03″E			
294	Eclipse Island (Western Australia)	35°11′00″S 117°52′54″E	Great Southern		
295	Eclipse Islands	13°54′53″S 126°18′24″E			
296	Edeline Islands	16°22′12″S 123°36′30″E		Kimberley	
297	Edwards Island (Western Australia)	31°01′48″S 115°19′23″E			
298	Egg Island (Shark Bay)	25°54′34″S 113°09′20″E	Shark Bay	Gascoyne	
299	Egret Island	20°39′14″S 116°25′46″E			
300	Eight Island	28°53′56″S 113°51′36″E	Houtman Abrolhos	Mid West	
301	Elbow Island	34°55′11″S 117°58′33″E			
302	Elsie Island (Western Australia)	14°14′27″S 127°42′24″E			
303	Ena Island	14°58′10″S 125°01′09″E			
304	Encounter Islands	32°38′29″S 115°52′24″E			
305	Endeavour Island	32°35′50″S 115°38′14″E			
306	Enderby Island (Western Australia)	20°36′32″S 116°31′11″E			
307	Entrance Island (Western Australia)	15°16′51″S 124°37′19″E			
308	Epsilon Island (Western Australia)	20°26′45″S 115°34′44″E	Montebello Islands	Pilbara	
309	Eric Island	14°15′39″S 127°43′47″E			
310	Escape Island	30°20′03″S 114°59′05″E			
311	Etisus Island	15°14′20″S 124°25′27″E			
312	Evelyn Island (Western Australia)	14°06′39″S 127°34′09″E			
313	Fairfax Island	15°11′05″S 128°06′11″E			
314	Fairway Islands	16°34′33″S 123°18′56″E			
315	False Island (Western Australia)	21°21′27″S 115°26′24″E			
316	False Island (Western Australia)	35°00′54″S 118°10′20″E			
317	Far Island	28°27′40″S 113°48′19″E	Houtman Abrolhos	Mid West	
318	Farr Islands	16°27′06″S 123°23′59″E			
319	Faure Island	25°51′22″S 113°53′35″E	Shark Bay	Gascoyne	
320	Favorite Island	30°17′03″S 115°00′21″E			
321	Fenelon Island	14°07′53″S 125°41′58″E			
322	Figure Of Eight Island	34°01′41″S 121°36′18″E			
323	Finch Islands	16°08′17″S 123°27′38″E			
324	Finger Island	34°06′15″S 122°20′37″E			
325	Finucane Island	20°18′16″S 118°33′04″E		Pilbara	Port Hedland
326	First Sister	28°28′39″S 113°44′33″E	Houtman Abrolhos	Mid West	
327	Fisherman Islands	30°07′50″S 114°56′33″E			
328	Flag Island (Western Australia)	20°27′33″S 115°34′44″E	Montebello Islands	Pilbara	
329	Flat Island (Western Australia)	14°09′12″S 125°41′53″E			
330	Flat Island (Western Australia)	21°36′13″S 114°37′13″E			
331	Fletcher Islands (Western Australia)	16°21′10″S 124°20′52″E		Kimberley	
332	Flinders Island (Western Australia)	34°24′54″S 115°12′17″E			
333	Flora Island	16°03′38″S 123°30′50″E			
334	Fly Island (Western Australia)	21°48′24″S 114°32′58″E			
335	Foale Island	28°52′45″S 114°00′20″E	Houtman Abrolhos	Mid West	
336	Folly Island (Western Australia)	16°22′46″S 123°25′26″E			
337	Fontanes Island	14°53′37″S 124°55′19″E			
338	Forbin Island	15°04′35″S 124°43′06″E			
339	Ford Island (Western Australia)	25°14′03″S 116°37′20″E	Gascoyne River		
340	Ford Island (Western Australia)	33°46′02″S 124°02′22″E			
341	Forestier Islands	20°35′08″S 117°46′16″E			
342	Forrest Island	33°55′03″S 122°42′29″E	Recherche Archipelago		
343	Fortescue Island	20°54′31″S 116°02′06″E			
344	Fossil Island	15°19′48″S 128°16′23″E			
345	Foxglove Island	20°29′00″S 115°32′26″E	Montebello Islands	Pilbara	
346	Fraser Island (Western Australia)	16°03′28″S 123°21′51″E	Buccaneer Archipelago	Kimberley	
347	Frazer Island	22°38′46″S 113°37′36″E		Pilbara	
348	Frederick Island	34°04′02″S 122°00′19″E			
349	Free Island	33°57′19″S 122°24′30″E			
350	Freycinet Island	26°24′26″S 113°37′00″E	Shark Bay	Gascoyne	
351	Friday Island (Shark Bay)	26°06′09″S 113°24′09″E	Shark Bay	Gascoyne	
352	Froggart Island	14°05′36″S 125°43′27″E			
353	Gabriel Island (Western Australia)	14°05′58″S 125°44′47″E			
354	Gadayim Pyramid	16°03′10″S 124°02′16″E			
355	Gagg Islands	16°10′27″S 123°25′34″E			
356	Gaimard Island	14°26′20″S 125°14′06″E			
357	Gale Island	14°56′03″S 124°55′10″E			
358	Gannet Island (Western Australia)	20°26′52″S 115°34′01″E	Montebello Islands	Pilbara	
359	Gap Island	15°19′51″S 124°52′09″E			
360	Garden Island (Western Australia)	32°12′18″S 115°40′24″E		Perth region	
361	Gardenia Island	20°23′02″S 115°31′36″E	Montebello Islands	Pilbara	
362	Gaze Island	28°51′50″S 113°59′25″E	Houtman Abrolhos	Mid West	
363	George Island (Western Australia)	34°03′07″S 123°15′26″E			
364	Geranium Islands	13°54′31″S 126°35′17″E			
365	Gibbings Island	16°09′11″S 123°30′51″E			
366	Gibson Island (Houtman Abrolhos)	28°41′13″S 113°49′40″E	Houtman Abrolhos	Mid West	
367	Gibson Island (Western Australia)	16°18′42″S 123°18′00″E			
368	Gidley Island	20°26′59″S 116°49′10″E			
369	Gilbert Island (Houtman Abrolhos)	28°40′05″S 113°49′34″E	Houtman Abrolhos	Mid West	
370	Gill Island (Western Australia)	15°45′53″S 124°45′11″E			
371	Glasse Island	34°25′22″S 119°24′34″E			
372	Glauert Island	15°03′37″S 124°58′18″E			
373	Glennie Island	34°05′49″S 123°06′13″E			
374	Gnandaroo Island	21°57′25″S 114°31′13″E			
375	Goat Island (Western Australia)	16°10′21″S 123°19′11″E	Buccaneer Archipelago	Kimberley	
376	Godman Island	33°57′54″S 122°48′10″E			
377	Godsmark Island	16°07′13″S 123°17′36″E			
378	Goodwyn Island	20°32′12″S 116°32′14″E			
379	Goongoolup Island	32°35′27″S 115°45′53″E			
380	Goose Island (Western Australia)	34°04′58″S 123°10′55″E			
381	Goose Island (Western Australia)	35°04′07″S 116°43′39″E			
382	Gould Island (Western Australia)	33°57′56″S 122°51′25″E		Great Southern	
383	Governor Islands (Western Australia)	13°56′36″S 126°41′58″E		Kimberley	
384	Granite Island (Western Australia)	15°29′17″S 124°35′59″E			
385	Great Sandy Island (Western Australia)	21°11′46″S 115°38′16″E		Pilbara	
386	Green Island (Rottnest Island)	32°01′03″S 115°29′50″E	Rottnest Island	Perth region	
387	Green Island (Kimberley coast)	15°28′38″S 124°35′57″E		Kimberley	
388	Green Island (Ord River)	15°28′42″S 128°18′55″E	In the Ord River	Kimberley	
389	Green Island (Western Australia)	34°59′11″S 117°56′59″E	King George Sound		
390	Green Islands (Western Australia)	30°40′57″S 115°06′15″E			
391	Green Islands (Western Australia)	35°07′38″S 117°51′44″E			
392	Greenhalgh Island	16°28′11″S 123°26′24″E			
393	Gregory Island (Houtman Abrolhos)	28°53′55″S 114°00′19″E	Houtman Abrolhos	Mid West	
394	Gregory Island (Kimberley coast)	16°18′59″S 123°18′31″E		Kimberley	
395	Greville Island	15°18′19″S 124°51′17″E			
396	Grey Island (Western Australia)	15°03′38″S 124°57′11″E		Kimberley	
397	Gulch Island (Western Australia)	34°01′31″S 123°14′50″E		Great Southern	
398	Gun Island	28°53′17″S 113°51′26″E	Pelsaert Group	Mid West	
399	Gunton Island	33°59′18″S 121°59′39″E			
400	Guy Reid Island	16°17′10″S 128°40′28″E			
401	Hagan Island	16°14′06″S 128°47′37″E			
402	Hale Island	14°23′20″S 125°24′42″E			
403	Hall Island (Houtman Abrolhos)	28°28′18″S 113°48′36″E	Houtman Abrolhos	Mid West	
404	Hamelin Island	34°13′28″S 115°00′48″E			
405	Hancock Island	16°25′48″S 123°09′18″E			
406	Harlequin Island	34°01′49″S 123°14′09″E			
407	Hartley Island	28°28′42″S 113°43′39″E			
408	Hasler Island	34°06′53″S 123°04′07″E			
409	Hastings Island (Western Australia)	34°05′54″S 122°07′02″E		Great Southern	
410	Hauy Island	20°26′08″S 116°58′01″E			
411	Hawick Island	14°20′14″S 125°22′45″E			
412	Haycock Island (Western Australia)	20°40′01″S 116°37′22″E			
413	Hazel Island	16°30′35″S 123°22′31″E			
414	Hecla Island (Western Australia)	13°58′44″S 125°59′57″E		Kimberley	
415	Hedley Island	14°56′43″S 124°39′50″E			
416	Heirisson Island	31°57′58″S 115°52′50″E			
417	Helby Island	15°14′02″S 128°06′29″E			
418	Helipad Island	16°16′18″S 124°10′05″E			
419	Helms Island	28°40′10″S 113°51′38″E	Houtman Abrolhos	Mid West	
420	Helpman Islands	16°43′11″S 123°36′50″E		Kimberley	
421	Hendy Island	34°02′55″S 121°53′05″E			
422	Heney Island	16°29′54″S 123°22′51″E			
423	Henrietta Islands	16°24′54″S 123°38′45″E			
424	Herbert Islands	16°27′31″S 123°25′01″E			
425	Hermite Island	20°28′04″S 115°31′23″E	Montebello Islands	Pilbara	
426	Heywood Island (Western Australia)	15°20′27″S 124°19′21″E		Kimberley	
427	Heywood Islands	15°20′27″S 124°19′21″E		Pilbara	
	Hibernia Reef		Ashmore Reef		
428	Hidden Island	16°13′32″S 123°28′03″E	Buccaneer Archipelago	Kimberley	
429	High Cliffy Islands	15°54′33″S 124°20′31″E		Kimberley	
430	High Island (Western Australia)	16°21′09″S 123°20′12″E			
431	High Island (Western Australia)	33°54′50″S 122°35′55″E			
432	Hollyhock Island (Western Australia)	20°22′43″S 115°32′46″E	Montebello Islands	Pilbara	
433	Holtham Island	16°26′55″S 123°06′26″E			
434	Home Island (Pulu Selma)	12°07′04″S 096°53′44″E	Cocos (Keeling) Islands		
435	Honeymoon Island (Western Australia)	34°59′31″S 117°20′35″E			
436	Hood Island (Western Australia)	34°08′34″S 122°02′53″E	Recherche Archipelago		
437	Hope Island (Western Australia)	22°10′16″S 114°28′07″E			
438	Hope Island (Western Australia)	34°04′46″S 122°09′42″E			
439	Horan Island	16°11′39″S 128°42′14″E			
440	Horatio Island	34°30′17″S 119°17′19″E			
441	Horsburgh Island	12°17′36″S 096°50′20″E	Cocos (Keeling) Islands		
442	Houtman Abrolhos	28°43′06″S 113°47′03″E	Houtman Abrolhos	Mid West	
443	How Island	20°25′14″S 115°33′09″E	Montebello Islands	Pilbara	
444	Howard Island (Western Australia)	16°23′17″S 123°04′03″E			
445	Howe Island (Western Australia)	34°08′57″S 122°01′16″E			
446	Hugo Island (Western Australia)	34°08′45″S 122°18′56″E		Esperance	
447	Hull Island (Western Australia)	33°58′06″S 122°50′32″E			
448	Hummock Island (Houtman Abrolhos)	28°48′02″S 114°02′20″E	Houtman Abrolhos	Mid West	
449	Hummock Island (Western Australia)	28°44′11″S 111°53′35″E		Mid West	about 200 km west of Houtman Abrolhos
450	Hunt Island	16°24′05″S 123°13′31″E			
451	Hutchison Islands	26°06′47″S 114°14′05″E	Shark Bay	Gascoyne	
452	Ibis Island (Western Australia)	32°36′16″S 115°38′54″E			
453	Imp Island (Western Australia)	16°22′57″S 123°08′15″E		Kimberley	King Sound
454	Ina Island	15°00′21″S 128°06′51″E			
455	Inner Island	35°00′16″S 118°09′37″E			
456	Inshore Island	33°55′00″S 122°49′38″E			
457	Institut Islands	14°08′27″S 125°41′09″E			
458	Intercourse Island	20°39′16″S 116°38′40″E			
459	Interview Island (Western Australia)	20°39′16″S 116°38′40″E			
460	Investigator Island	34°02′59″S 120°53′59″E			
461	Iredale Island	14°54′49″S 124°40′56″E			
462	Iris Refuge Island	28°52′48″S 114°00′16″E	Houtman Abrolhos	Mid West	
463	Iron Islands (Western Australia)	16°10′04″S 123°47′41″E			
464	Irvine Island	16°04′35″S 123°32′14″E	Buccaneer Archipelago	Kimberley	
465	Islam Islets	22°13′16″S 114°25′37″E			
466	Ivy Island	20°29′42″S 115°32′35″E	Montebello Islands	Pilbara	
467	Jacks Island	34°59′13″S 117°21′40″E			
468	Jackson Island (Houtman Abrolhos)	28°52′17″S 114°00′10″E	Houtman Abrolhos	Mid West	
469	Jackson Island (Western Australia)	15°10′11″S 124°38′39″E			
470	Jackson Island (Western Australia)	16°25′43″S 123°06′13″E			
471	Jar Island	14°09′12″S 126°14′04″E			
472	Jarman Island	20°39′35″S 117°12′58″E			
473	Jeegarnyeejip Island	32°34′53″S 115°46′20″E			
474	Jennala Island	32°34′27″S 115°45′48″E			
475	Joe Smith Island	28°40′55″S 113°51′28″E	Houtman Abrolhos	Mid West	
476	John Island	33°55′16″S 122°36′23″E			
477	Jon Jim Island	28°59′14″S 113°57′34″E	Houtman Abrolhos	Mid West	
478	Jones Island (Western Australia)	13°45′29″S 126°21′31″E			
479	Jonquil Island	20°23′54″S 115°31′51″E	Montebello Islands	Pilbara	
480	Josey Island	16°14′26″S 128°46′30″E			
481	Joshuah Island	32°00′24″S 115°46′51″E			
482	Jungulu Island	15°17′59″S 124°23′48″E	Bonaparte Archipelago	Kimberley	
483	Jussieu Island	14°42′53″S 124°58′34″E		Kimberley	
484	Kangaroo Island (Shark Bay)	26°19′09″S 113°29′58″E	Shark Bay	Gascoyne	
485	Kanggurryu Island	14°43′24″S 128°37′57″E			
486	Kankanmengarri Island	14°22′32″S 125°40′29″E			
487	Kannamatju Island	15°27′36″S 124°29′27″E			
488	Karangi Island	20°26′05″S 115°36′07″E	Montebello Islands	Pilbara	
489	Kartja Island	14°51′51″S 125°10′44″E			
490	Katers Island	14°28′03″S 125°31′55″E			
491	Kathleen Island	16°03′59″S 123°33′18″E			
492	Keast Island	20°23′24″S 116°49′48″E			
493	Kendrew Island	20°28′44″S 116°32′11″E			
494	Kent Island (Western Australia)	15°09′29″S 128°06′48″E			
495	Keraudren Island	14°56′33″S 124°41′02″E		Kimberley	
496	Kermadec Island	34°05′21″S 122°49′58″E			
497	Keru Island	28°43′34″S 113°49′57″E	Houtman Abrolhos	Mid West	
498	Kessel Island	16°29′26″S 123°21′39″E			
499	Kid Island	15°39′55″S 124°23′59″E			
500	Kidney Island (Western Australia)	14°19′53″S 125°58′47″E			
501	Kilfoyle Island	16°13′25″S 128°46′47″E			
502	Kim Island	13°52′51″S 126°35′25″E			
503	Kimberley Island	33°57′02″S 122°28′02″E			
504	King Hall Island	16°04′52″S 123°24′29″E	Buccaneer Archipelago	Kimberley	
505	King Island (Western Australia)	15°52′28″S 123°38′05″E			
506	Kingcup Island	20°23′30″S 115°31′50″E	Montebello Islands	Pilbara	
507	Kingfisher Island	16°06′05″S 124°04′47″E			
508	Kingfisher Islands	16°05′49″S 124°04′46″E			
509	Kingsmill Islands (Western Australia)	14°10′00″S 125°46′43″E			
510	Koks Island	24°45′02″S 113°09′33″E	Shark Bay	Gascoyne	
511	Kolganu Island	16°23′55″S 123°09′38″E			
512	Koojarra Island	13°47′42″S 126°35′21″E			
513	Koolan Island	16°07′31″S 123°44′18″E	Buccaneer Archipelago	Kimberley	
514	Kuntjumal Kutangari Island	14°13′44″S 125°47′46″E			
515	Lacepede Islands	16°52′11″S 122°09′30″E	Lacepede Islands	Kimberley	
516	Lachlan Island	16°37′24″S 123°30′55″E			
517	Lacrosse Island	14°44′49″S 128°18′10″E			
518	Lady Nora Island	20°27′27″S 116°37′36″E			
519	Lafontaine Island	14°09′44″S 125°47′16″E			
520	Lagoon Island (Houtman Abrolhos)	28°52′22″S 113°59′39″E	Houtman Abrolhos	Mid West	
521	Lagoon Island	16°19′41″S 128°40′41″E			
522	Lagrange Island	14°12′43″S 125°45′55″E			
523	Lake Island	31°45′17″S 115°47′19″E			
524	Lalowan Island	16°26′22″S 123°08′46″E			
525	Lamarck Island	14°47′03″S 125°01′30″E		Kimberley	
526	Lammas Island	15°18′55″S 124°51′40″E			
527	Lancelin Island	31°00′27″S 115°18′53″E			
528	Laplace Island (Western Australia)	14°11′26″S 125°39′28″E		Kimberley	
529	Large Island (Western Australia)	21°17′47″S 115°30′02″E			
530	Laseron Island	15°13′52″S 124°31′02″E			
531	Latirus Island	15°13′52″S 124°31′22″E			
532	Lauangi Island	14°10′37″S 125°40′04″E			
533	Lavoisier Island (Western Australia)	14°13′24″S 125°38′26″E			
534	Ledge Islet	34°51′13″S 116°05′52″E			
535	Lefebre Island	26°13′50″S 113°30′25″E	Shark Bay	Gascoyne	
536	Legendre Island	20°23′21″S 116°52′44″E			
537	Leila Island	16°30′28″S 123°22′55″E			
538	Leo Island	28°41′22″S 113°51′36″E	Houtman Abrolhos	Mid West	
539	Leonie Island	16°24′49″S 123°05′36″E			
540	Lesueur Island	13°49′11″S 127°16′10″E			
541	Leveque Island	16°23′10″S 122°55′25″E			
542	Libke Island	34°13′15″S 122°04′03″E			
543	Lichen Island	33°54′12″S 122°58′13″E			
544	Lily Island	20°25′15″S 115°35′07″E	Montebello Islands	Pilbara	
545	Lion Island (Western Australia)	33°52′47″S 122°01′20″E			
546	Lion Islands	34°18′27″S 115°09′41″E			
547	Lipfert Island	30°01′28″S 114°57′32″E			
548	Little Island (Western Australia)	31°48′47″S 115°42′25″E			
549	Little Island (Western Australia)	34°27′28″S 121°59′19″E			
550	Little North Island	28°37′51″S 113°52′53″E	Houtman Abrolhos	Mid West	
551	Little Pigeon Island	28°27′49″S 113°43′20″E	Houtman Abrolhos	Mid West	
552	Little Rabbit Island	34°58′53″S 117°24′21″E			
553	Little Rat Island	28°43′41″S 113°47′07″E	Houtman Abrolhos	Mid West	
554	Little Rocky Island	21°26′03″S 115°24′44″E			
555	Little Roma Island	28°44′07″S 113°46′51″E	Houtman Abrolhos	Mid West	
556	Little Turtle Island	20°01′13″S 118°48′30″E		Pilbara	
557	Little Yunderup Island	32°35′28″S 115°45′43″E			
558	Livingstone Island	16°26′35″S 123°06′33″E			
559	Lizard Island (Western Australia)	15°55′56″S 124°25′11″E			
560	Locker Island	21°42′59″S 114°45′56″E			
561	Long Island (Houtman Abrolhos)	28°28′20″S 113°46′21″E	Wallabi Group	Mid West	
562	Long Island (Western Australia)	13°57′36″S 126°18′23″E			
563	Long Island (Buccaneer Archipelago)	16°34′26″S 123°22′11″E	Buccaneer Archipelago	Kimberley	
564	Long Island (Western Australia)	21°00′51″S 115°50′59″E			
565	Long Island (Western Australia)	21°47′37″S 119°25′38″E			
566	Long Island (Western Australia)	34°02′57″S 121°57′42″E			
567	Longitude Island	16°03′34″S 123°24′01″E	Buccaneer Archipelago	Kimberley	
568	Lord Island	16°09′02″S 123°26′55″E			
569	Lorraine Island	33°57′00″S 122°33′46″E			
570	Louis Islands	13°59′55″S 126°32′40″E			
571	Louis Islands	14°00′27″S 126°32′23″E			
572	Low Island (Western Australia)	14°09′53″S 126°17′27″E			
573	Low Island (Western Australia)	20°41′32″S 116°34′29″E			
574	Lowendal Islands	20°38′56″S 115°34′17″E			
575	Lucas Island (Western Australia)	15°12′31″S 124°29′21″E			
576	Lulim Island	15°32′43″S 124°24′41″E			
577	Mably Island	14°57′03″S 124°52′57″E			
578	Mac Mahon Island	16°30′02″S 123°21′42″E			
579	Mackenzie Island (Western Australia)	34°11′53″S 122°06′13″E			
580	Macleay Island (Western Australia)	15°56′41″S 123°41′28″E			
581	Macleay Islands	15°53′17″S 123°39′19″E			
582	Malcolm Island (Western Australia)	14°31′19″S 125°54′13″E			
583	Malup Island	31°44′12″S 115°46′55″E			
584	Malus Islands	20°31′08″S 116°40′24″E			
585	Man On Rock Islet	20°23′59″S 115°31′51″E			
586	Mangrove Group	28°52′16″S 113°58′21″E			
587	Mangrove Islands	21°30′05″S 115°21′15″E			
588	Mangrove Point	15°47′58″S 124°38′51″E			
589	Manicom Island	34°06′49″S 123°01′45″E			
590	Mardie Island	20°57′52″S 115°58′55″E			
591	Maret Islands	14°24′35″S 124°58′31″E			
592	Margaret Island (Western Australia)	16°22′30″S 123°23′34″E			
593	Marigold Island	20°27′33″S 115°33′14″E	Montebello Islands	Pilbara	
594	Marinula Island	28°28′31″S 113°41′57″E	Houtman Abrolhos	Mid West	
595	Marndungum Island	15°55′42″S 124°19′26″E			
596	Mart Islands	34°00′11″S 122°37′53″E			
597	Mary Anne Group	21°17′47″S 115°29′56″E			
598	Mary Anne Island (Shark Bay)	26°29′06″S 113°40′59″E	Shark Bay	Gascoyne	
599	Mary Anne Island	21°15′48″S 115°27′41″E		Pilbara	
600	Mary Durack Island	16°19′41″S 128°41′09″E			
601	Mary Island North	17°15′54″S 123°32′43″E			
602	Mary Island South	17°18′37″S 123°32′43″E			
603	Mary Island (Western Australia)	13°59′49″S 126°22′47″E		Kimberley	
604	Mary Islands	16°22′03″S 123°29′45″E			
605	Mawby Island	20°31′15″S 116°41′34″E			
606	Mcculloch Island	14°56′10″S 124°40′23″E			
607	Mcintyre Island	15°59′16″S 123°32′13″E			
608	Meade Island	26°00′05″S 113°11′57″E	Shark Bay	Gascoyne	
609	Meeyip Island	32°34′48″S 115°45′49″E			
610	Melomys Island	16°09′04″S 124°04′48″E			
611	Mermaid Island	16°26′01″S 123°21′03″E			
612	Miawaja Island	15°12′52″S 124°24′38″E			
613	Michaelmas Island	35°02′39″S 118°02′09″E			
614	Mictyis Island	15°12′39″S 124°47′53″E			
615	Mid Lyons Island	25°02′08″S 115°08′23″E	Kennedy Range National Park		Gascoyne Junction
	Middle Island (Ashmore and Cartier Islands)	12°15′00″S 123°05′00″E	Ashmore Reef		
616	Middle Island (Houtman Abrolhos)	28°54′31″S 113°54′36″E	Pelsaert Group	Mid West	
617	Middle Island (Lacepede Islands)	16°51′29″S 122°08′13″E	Lacepede Islands	Kimberley	
618	Middle Island (Western Australia)	16°26′55″S 123°05′02″E			
619	Middle Island (Western Australia)	20°54′31″S 115°19′36″E			
620	Middle Island (Recherche Archipelago)	34°06′04″S 123°11′20″E	Recherche Archipelago		
621	Middle Mangrove Island	21°28′47″S 115°21′11″E			
622	Middle Mary Anne Island	21°17′36″S 115°34′14″E		Pilbara	
623	Middle Osborn Island	14°19′36″S 126°00′20″E			
624	Middle Passage Island	21°02′58″S 115°50′16″E			
625	Midway Island (Western Australia)	15°16′57″S 124°52′00″E			
626	Migo Island	35°04′20″S 117°38′48″E			
627	Miles Island	34°04′04″S 123°13′53″E			
628	Milligan Island	30°02′16″S 114°57′18″E			
629	Mistaken Island	20°39′19″S 116°39′42″E			
630	Mistaken Island	35°03′49″S 117°56′34″E			
631	Molema Island	16°15′37″S 123°54′10″E			
632	Moliere Island	14°13′46″S 125°49′33″E			
633	Molloy Island	34°16′09″S 115°12′26″E			
634	Mondrain Island	34°08′14″S 122°14′43″E	Recherche Archipelago		
635	Monge Island	14°12′30″S 125°36′30″E			
636	Monsmont Island	16°17′50″S 128°42′00″E			
637	Montebello Islands	20°26′10″S 115°31′41″E			An archipelago of around 174 small islands
638	Montesquieu Islands	14°06′15″S 125°43′54″E			
639	Montgomery Islands	15°57′38″S 124°12′18″E			
640	Morley Island	28°44′47″S 113°48′45″E	Easter Group	Mid West	
641	Morrisey Island	16°31′46″S 123°24′33″E			
642	Muddle Islands	16°23′12″S 123°26′29″E			
643	Muir Island (Western Australia)	16°03′39″S 124°02′08″E			
644	Muiron Islands	21°40′08″S 114°20′32″E			
645	Mulgudna Island	16°03′14″S 124°18′20″E		Kimberley	
646	Murrangingi Island	14°21′31″S 125°34′38″E			
647	Murrara Island	14°59′41″S 125°14′27″E			
648	Murray Island (Houtman Abrolhos)	28°53′53″S 113°53′47″E	Houtman Abrolhos	Mid West	
649	Museums Island	14°56′57″S 124°45′08″E			
650	Mushroom Island	20°43′26″S 115°28′56″E			
651	Myres Island	14°34′28″S 125°53′12″E			
652	Nalamdarim Island	16°14′56″S 128°42′44″E			
653	Nares Island	33°56′01″S 122°35′35″E			
654	New Island (Western Australia)	34°01′09″S 122°08′28″E			
655	New Year Island (Western Australia)	33°51′26″S 124°07′32″E			
656	Newbold Island	28°52′54″S 114°00′19″E	Houtman Abrolhos	Mid West	
657	Newdegate Island	35°00′34″S 116°42′31″E			
658	Newman Island (Houtman Abrolhos)	28°51′48″S 113°59′42″E	Houtman Abrolhos	Mid West	
659	Ngalanguru Island	15°54′36″S 124°20′31″E			
660	Nglayu Island	14°21′13″S 125°42′38″E			
661	Nook Island	28°51′58″S 113°59′57″E	Houtman Abrolhos	Mid West	
662	North East Regnard Island	20°46′31″S 116°18′28″E			
663	North East Twin Island	21°30′38″S 115°12′55″E			
664	North Eclipse Island	13°52′43″S 126°18′26″E			
665	North Guano Island	26°31′59″S 113°41′25″E	Shark Bay	Gascoyne	
666	North Hummocks	16°13′34″S 128°45′13″E			
667	North Island (Houtman Abrolhos)	28°18′09″S 113°35′41″E	Houtman Abrolhos	Mid West	
668	North Island (Mangrove Islands)	21°27′22″S 115°22′07″E			
669	North Kangaroo Island	26°17′57″S 113°30′11″E	Shark Bay	Gascoyne	
670	North Keeling Island	11°48′52″S 096°49′28″E	Cocos (Keeling) Islands		
671	North Muiron Island	21°38′18″S 114°22′25″E			
672	North Sandy Island	21°06′17″S 115°39′03″E			
673	North Tail	30°16′20″S 114°58′08″E			
674	North Turtle Island	19°53′25″S 118°53′44″E		Pilbara	
675	North Twin Peak Island	33°59′27″S 122°50′18″E			
676	North West Island (Western Australia)	20°21′50″S 115°31′27″E	Montebello Islands	Pilbara	
677	North West Twin Island	16°16′41″S 123°03′34″E			
678	Numanbu Island	15°19′53″S 124°12′38″E			
679	Numbered Islands	28°54′24″S 113°52′16″E			
680	Nuyts Archipelago	32°23′00″S 113°37′00″E			
681	Observation Island (Western Australia)	21°44′26″S 114°32′26″E			
682	Observatory Island	33°55′27″S 121°47′31″E	Recherche Archipelago		
683	Okenia Island	15°13′54″S 124°29′01″E			
684	Oliver Island (Western Australia)	14°05′38″S 125°44′23″E		Kimberley	
685	Onad Island	16°22′13″S 124°27′03″E			
686	One Tree Island (Western Australia)	15°20′31″S 124°44′48″E			
687	Osborn Islands	14°16′22″S 126°02′02″E			
688	Osprey Island	30°18′39″S 114°59′40″E			
689	Otway Island	15°16′07″S 128°06′20″E			
690	Owen Island	34°02′30″S 123°14′08″E			
691	Oystercatcher Island	28°27′48″S 113°42′47″E	Houtman Abrolhos	Mid West	
692	Pack Island	16°30′50″S 123°24′31″E			
693	Packer Island	16°34′10″S 122°47′19″E		Kimberley	
694	Packer Islands	16°17′33″S 123°28′40″E			
695	Pansy Island	20°22′30″S 115°32′35″E	Montebello Islands	Pilbara	
696	Panton Island	15°15′50″S 128°14′26″E			
697	Parakeelya Island	20°37′56″S 115°31′11″E		Pilbara	Barrow Island
698	Parakeet Island	31°59′18″S 115°30′45″E			
699	Parrot Island	26°24′45″S 113°30′09″E	Shark Bay	Gascoyne	
700	Parry Island (Western Australia)	14°19′20″S 125°45′53″E			
701	Pascal Island (Western Australia)	14°04′08″S 125°38′59″E		Kimberley	
702	Pasco Island	16°31′10″S 123°23′19″E			
703	Pasco Island	20°57′40″S 115°20′17″E			
704	Pasco Island	34°03′54″S 122°06′10″E			
705	Pasley Island	34°00′44″S 123°31′49″E			
706	Passage Island (Western Australia)	21°06′23″S 115°47′04″E			
707	Passage Islands (Western Australia)	21°00′44″S 115°50′52″E			
708	Patricia Island	14°15′34″S 125°18′27″E			
709	Peak Island (Western Australia)	21°36′07″S 114°30′27″E			
710	Peak Island (Western Australia)	34°13′00″S 115°01′06″E			
711	Pearson Islands	34°12′18″S 122°20′48″E			
712	Pecked Island	16°31′30″S 123°26′24″E			
713	Pelican Island (Albany coast)	34°59′38″S 117°23′41″E			
714	Pelican Island (Houtman Abrolhos)	28°27′36″S 113°40′34″E	Houtman Abrolhos	Mid West	
715	Pelican Island (Kimberley coast)	14°46′10″S 128°46′26″E		Kimberley	
716	Pelican Island (Shark Bay)	25°51′12″S 114°00′48″E	Shark Bay	Gascoyne	
717	Pell Creek Island	25°13′55″S 115°32′25″E	Kennedy Range National Park		Thomas River
718	Pelsaert Group	28°54′18″S 113°54′43″E	Pelsaert Group	Mid West	
719	Pelsaert Island	28°55′45″S 113°58′27″E	Pelsaert Group	Mid West	
720	Pemberton Island	20°39′48″S 116°57′02″E			
721	Penguin Island (Western Australia)	32°18′23″S 115°41′20″E			
722	Picard Island (Western Australia)	20°40′56″S 117°15′47″E			
723	Pigeon Island (Houtman Abrolhos)	28°27′18″S 113°43′34″E	Houtman Abrolhos	Mid West	
724	Plover Island	28°28′05″S 113°42′43″E	Houtman Abrolhos	Mid West	
725	Pointer Island	33°43′21″S 124°05′46″E			
726	Poolngin Island	16°23′36″S 123°08′58″E			
727	Pope Island	16°10′44″S 123°20′21″E			
728	Pope Island	16°29′35″S 123°21′51″E			
729	Post Office Island	28°51′53″S 113°58′28″E	Houtman Abrolhos	Mid West	
730	Potter Island	20°56′21″S 116°09′01″E			
731	Powerful Island	16°05′57″S 123°25′50″E	Buccaneer Archipelago	Kimberley	
732	Preston Island	20°49′38″S 116°11′32″E			
733	Primrose Island	20°22′19″S 115°30′52″E	Montebello Islands	Pilbara	
734	Prince Island (Western Australia)	15°13′18″S 128°12′16″E		Kimberley	
735	Prince Island	20°43′41″S 115°28′30″E			
736	Prison Island (Western Australia)	12°06′12″S 096°53′11″E	Cocos (Keeling) Islands		
737	Prudhoe Island	14°25′18″S 125°15′46″E			
738	Prudhoe Islands	14°25′14″S 125°15′29″E			
739	Pulu Ampang Kechil	12°07′28″S 096°54′24″E	Cocos (Keeling) Islands		
740	Pulu Ampang	12°07′38″S 096°54′30″E	Cocos (Keeling) Islands		
741	Pulu Belan Madar	12°12′03″S 096°52′56″E	Cocos (Keeling) Islands		
742	Pulu Belan	12°11′50″S 096°52′42″E	Cocos (Keeling) Islands		
743	Pulu Belekok	12°07′53″S 096°54′32″E	Cocos (Keeling) Islands		
744	Pulu Cheplok	12°08′12″S 096°54′49″E	Cocos (Keeling) Islands		
745	Pulu Gangsa	12°06′20″S 096°53′15″E	Cocos (Keeling) Islands		
746	Pulu Jembatan	12°08′45″S 096°54′59″E	Cocos (Keeling) Islands		
747	Pulu Kambing	12°11′40″S 096°50′56″E	Cocos (Keeling) Islands		
748	Pulu Kembang	12°08′00″S 096°54′37″E	Cocos (Keeling) Islands		
749	Pulu Labu	12°09′27″S 096°55′05″E	Cocos (Keeling) Islands		
750	Pulu Maria	12°11′57″S 096°51′56″E	Cocos (Keeling) Islands		
751	Pulu Pandan	12°08′50″S 096°55′10″E	Cocos (Keeling) Islands		
752	Pulu Pasir	12°05′42″S 096°53′11″E	Cocos (Keeling) Islands		
	Pulu Selma (Home Island)	12°07′04″S 096°53′44″E	Cocos (Keeling) Islands		
753	Pulu Siput	12°09′13″S 096°55′04″E	Cocos (Keeling) Islands		
754	Pulu Wak Banka	12°08′35″S 096°55′02″E	Cocos (Keeling) Islands		
755	Pulu Wak Idas	12°07′45″S 096°54′31″E	Cocos (Keeling) Islands		
756	Pumpkin Islands	16°16′45″S 128°43′41″E			
757	Pup Island	21°09′41″S 115°39′15″E		Pilbara	
758	Purrungku Island	14°38′32″S 125°13′40″E			
759	Pyrene Island	15°15′26″S 124°24′09″E			
760	Quagering Island	34°51′01″S 115°59′38″E			
761	Quartermaine Island	20°28′17″S 116°37′22″E			
762	Queen Island	14°35′39″S 125°04′17″E			
763	Quoy Island	14°25′35″S 125°14′24″E			
764	Rabbit Island (Western Australia)	33°54′54″S 121°53′31″E			
765	Rabbit Island (Western Australia)	34°59′00″S 117°24′23″E			
766	Racine Island	14°15′56″S 125°49′34″E			
767	Ram Island (Western Australia)	34°01′55″S 122°08′29″E			
768	Randall Island	14°08′37″S 125°34′39″E			
769	Rankin Island	16°19′19″S 124°23′23″E			
770	Rat Island (Houtman Abrolhos)	28°42′56″S 113°47′02″E	Easter Group	Mid West	
771	Rat Island (Western Australia)	16°24′05″S 123°07′07″E			
772	Rathbun Island	14°55′54″S 124°40′40″E			
773	Razor Islands	16°27′05″S 123°33′08″E			
774	Red Island (Western Australia)	13°54′06″S 126°06′13″E			
	Recherche Archipelago	34°12′14″S 122°20′54″E	Recherche Archipelago		
775	Red Island (Western Australia)	15°12′49″S 124°15′30″E			
776	Red Island (Western Australia)	33°52′21″S 121°20′55″E			
777	Red Island (Western Australia)	34°02′13″S 119°46′58″E			
778	Red Islet	18°42′04″S 121°41′37″E			
779	Reef Island	20°28′18″S 117°55′24″E		Pilbara	
780	Rees Island	16°23′13″S 123°06′16″E			
781	Remark Island	34°03′52″S 121°59′03″E			
782	Remote Island	16°17′47″S 128°45′09″E			
783	Reveley Island	14°22′11″S 127°48′45″E			
784	Richards Island (Western Australia)	35°04′33″S 117°38′52″E			
785	Ridley Island	31°56′26″S 116°24′52″E			
786	Ripon Island	20°06′29″S 119°11′58″E			
787	Rivoli Islands	21°56′26″S 114°27′12″E			
788	Rob Island	34°02′02″S 122°13′55″E			
789	Roberts Island	16°06′41″S 123°45′59″E			
790	Roberts Island	22°25′09″S 114°11′01″E			
791	Robertson Island (Houtman Abrolhos)	28°52′58″S 114°00′20″E	Houtman Abrolhos	Mid West	
792	Rocky Island (Western Australia)	14°05′46″S 127°32′50″E			
793	Rocky Island (Western Australia)	21°32′31″S 119°20′10″E			
794	Rocky Island (Western Australia)	34°04′54″S 115°21′04″E			
795	Rocky Islands	15°07′25″S 124°30′44″E			
796	Rocky Islands	21°52′21″S 114°35′59″E			
797	Rodondo Island (Western Australia)	33°49′38″S 123°58′53″E			
798	Roe Island (Western Australia)	20°46′56″S 117°08′48″E			
799	Roma Island	28°43′57″S 113°47′06″E	Houtman Abrolhos	Mid West	
800	Ron Courtney Island	31°55′18″S 115°56′23″E			
801	Ronsard Island	20°31′42″S 117°51′32″E			
802	Rose Island (Western Australia)	20°25′22″S 115°32′58″E	Montebello Islands	Pilbara	
803	Rosemary Island	20°28′58″S 116°35′31″E	Dampier Archipelago		
804	Rosily Islands	21°15′54″S 115°01′29″E		Pilbara	
805	Rotondella Island	28°52′21″S 113°59′45″E	Houtman Abrolhos	Mid West	
806	Rottnest Island	32°00′22″S 115°36′46″E			
807	Round Island (Western Australia)	16°09′49″S 123°46′00″E			
808	Round Island (Western Australia)	20°58′38″S 115°51′38″E			
809	Round Island (Western Australia)	21°38′48″S 114°39′09″E			
810	Round Island (Western Australia)	34°06′21″S 123°53′11″E			
811	Roy Island	34°01′45″S 122°14′26″E			
812	Ruby Island	33°57′11″S 123°07′09″E			
813	Russell Island (Western Australia)	15°13′56″S 128°05′47″E			
814	Sable Island (Western Australia)	20°35′08″S 117°46′16″E			
815	Saddle Island (Western Australia)	35°03′02″S 116°43′50″E			
816	Saint Alouarn Island	34°24′20″S 115°11′41″E			
817	Saint Alouarn Islands	34°24′20″S 115°11′41″E			
818	St Andrew Island	15°21′29″S 125°00′42″E			
819	Saint Patrick Island	15°21′15″S 124°57′38″E			
820	Salier Islands	16°18′56″S 123°16′33″E			
821	Salisbury Island (Western Australia)	34°21′39″S 123°33′01″E	Recherche Archipelago		
822	Salural Island	16°23′13″S 123°07′50″E			
823	Salutation Island	26°32′22″S 113°45′56″E	Shark Bay	Gascoyne	
824	Sand Cay	14°14′32″S 125°19′09″E			
825	Sand Island (Western Australia)	13°51′06″S 125°48′23″E			
826	Sandland Island	30°12′40″S 114°59′16″E			
827	Sandpiper Island	32°36′19″S 115°38′50″E			
828	Sandy Hook Island	34°02′04″S 121°59′32″E			
829	Sandy Island (Easter Group)	28°46′31″S 113°47′08″E	Houtman Abrolhos	Mid West	
830	Sandy Island (Lacepede Islands)	16°52′57″S 122°10′04″E	Lacepede Islands	Kimberley	
831	Sandy Island (Pelsaert Group)	28°52′22″S 113°52′35″E	Houtman Abrolhos	Mid West	
832	Sandy Island (Western Australia)	13°45′58″S 126°47′24″E			
833	Sandy Island (Western Australia)	20°38′04″S 117°40′59″E			
834	Sandy Island (Western Australia)	20°42′47″S 116°33′59″E			
835	Sandy Island (Western Australia)	34°52′02″S 116°02′12″E			
836	Saville Island	15°08′58″S 128°06′03″E			
837	Saville-Kent Island	28°27′56″S 113°48′27″E	Houtman Abrolhos	Mid West	
838	Scaddan Island	16°08′02″S 123°51′16″E			
839	Scorpion Island (Western Australia)	13°51′50″S 126°37′18″E			
840	Scott Island (Western Australia)	16°29′10″S 123°21′20″E			
841	Seagull Island (Houtman Abrolhos)	28°27′29″S 113°42′52″E	Houtman Abrolhos	Mid West	
842	Seagull Island	35°04′24″S 117°40′33″E			
843	Seal Island (Houtman Abrolhos)	28°29′01″S 113°48′07″E	Geraldton	Mid West	
844	Seal Island (Shoalwater, Western Australia)	32°17′36″S 115°41′19″E	Shoalwater	Perth region	
845	Seal Island (Ravensthorpe, Western Australia)	33°57′46″S 120°07′40″E	Ravensthorpe	Great Southern	
846	Seal Island (Augusta, Western Australia)	34°22′51″S 115°09′18″E	Augusta	South West region	
847	Seal Island (Albany, Western Australia)	35°04′35″S 117°58′21″E	Albany	Great Southern	
848	Seaward Ledge	30°17′30″S 114°58′09″E			
849	Second Sister	28°29′08″S 113°44′25″E	Houtman Abrolhos	Mid West	
850	Serene Island	14°54′28″S 124°43′07″E			
851	Serrurier Island	21°36′26″S 114°40′45″E			
852	Serventy Island	28°40′59″S 113°49′52″E	Houtman Abrolhos	Mid West	
853	Shag Island	32°17′44.7″S 115°41′30.2″E			
854	Shag Rock (Houtman Abrolhos)	28°28′32″S 113°42′43″E	Houtman Abrolhos	Mid West	
855	Shale Island	16°22′48″S 124°20′19″E			
856	Shannon Island (Western Australia)	34°53′46″S 116°25′02″E			
857	Shearwater Island	28°43′56″S 113°49′29″E	Houtman Abrolhos	Mid West	
858	Sheep Island (Western Australia)	15°29′22″S 124°36′44″E			
859	Shelter Island (Western Australia)	35°03′04″S 117°41′25″E			
860	Shirley Island (Western Australia)	16°15′59″S 123°26′39″E			
861	Sholl Island	20°56′45″S 115°53′19″E			
862	Sid Liddon Island (6 Island)	28°54′40″S 113°51′49″E	Houtman Abrolhos	Mid West	
863	Simpson Island	22°07′44″S 114°29′04″E			
864	Sir Frederick Island	16°07′35″S 123°24′06″E			
865	Sir Graham Moore Island	13°53′24″S 126°31′44″E		Kimberley	
866	Sir Graham Moore Islands (Western Australia)	13°52′54″S 126°36′11″E		Kimberley	
867	Sir Richard Island	16°24′51″S 123°29′12″E			
868	Six Mile Island (Western Australia)	33°38′29″S 123°57′44″E			
869	Skink Island	33°59′14″S 123°08′49″E			
870	Slade Island	15°29′31″S 124°33′23″E			
871	Slate Islands (Western Australia)	15°31′55″S 124°24′00″E			
872	Slipper Island (Western Australia)	34°02′44″S 122°45′11″E			
873	Slope Island	26°05′27″S 113°24′45″E	Shark Bay	Gascoyne	
874	Smith Islands (Shark Bay)	26°34′59″S 113°43′24″E	Shark Bay	Gascoyne	
875	Snag Island	29°56′10″S 114°58′32″E			
876	Solem Islands	14°12′19″S 125°38′25″E			
877	Solitary Island	19°55′27″S 119°54′50″E			
878	Solitary Island	21°08′03″S 115°50′00″E			
879	Somerville Island	21°57′38″S 114°29′21″E			
880	South East Island (Western Australia)	20°25′27″S 115°35′19″E	Montebello Islands	Pilbara	
881	South East Islands	34°21′29″S 123°32′59″E			
882	South East Twin Island	16°17′38″S 123°05′24″E			
883	South Guano Island	26°32′45″S 113°41′26″E	Shark Bay	Gascoyne	
884	South Hummocks	16°14′06″S 128°45′50″E			
885	South Island (Western Australia)	12°11′25″S 096°55′21″E	Cocos (Keeling) Islands		
886	South Island (Western Australia)	21°30′33″S 115°21′06″E			
887	South Keeling Islands	12°11′25″S 096°55′21″E	Cocos (Keeling) Islands		
888	South Maret Island	14°26′28″S 124°59′05″E			
889	South Muiron Island	21°41′01″S 114°19′25″E			
890	South Passage Island	21°08′36″S 115°43′42″E			
891	South Twin Peak Island	34°00′27″S 122°48′12″E			
892	South Wailgwin Island	15°32′27″S 124°23′57″E			
893	South West Osborn Island	14°21′48″S 125°56′52″E			
894	South West Regnard Island	20°48′34″S 116°14′32″E			
895	South West Twin Island	21°31′18″S 115°12′04″E			
896	Southwest Island	35°11′36″S 117°52′02″E			
897	Spar Island	20°29′15″S 115°33′43″E	Montebello Islands	Pilbara	
898	Sparkling Island	34°28′54″S 119°21′47″E			
899	Spider Island	16°09′36″S 128°43′42″E			
900	Spindle Island	33°45′52″S 124°09′34″E			
901	Square Island	28°54′07″S 113°56′38″E	Houtman Abrolhos	Mid West	
902	Stanley Island	35°04′01″S 117°09′11″E			
903	Station Island (Western Australia)	33°57′40″S 122°31′16″E			
904	Steamboat Island	20°49′20″S 116°03′56″E			
905	Steep Head Island	14°26′36″S 125°59′26″E			
906	Steep Island	16°03′37″S 124°28′09″E			
907	Stewart Island (Western Australia)	20°52′48″S 115°56′21″E			
908	Stewart Islands (Western Australia)	13°41′41″S 126°53′39″E			
909	Stick Island	28°53′22″S 113°55′11″E	Houtman Abrolhos	Mid West	
910	Stokes Island	28°40′30″S 113°51′02″E	Houtman Abrolhos	Mid West	
911	Stony Island (Western Australia)	35°06′30″S 117°47′07″E			
912	Storr Island	15°56′25″S 124°34′09″E			
913	Suffren Island	14°32′34″S 124°55′38″E			
914	Sunday Island (Exmouth Gulf)	21°42′15″S 114°25′06″E		Pilbara	
915	Sunday Island (King Sound)	16°24′25″S 123°11′13″E	Buccaneer Archipelago	Kimberley	
916	Sunday Island (Shark Bay)	26°07′32″S 113°14′06″E	Shark Bay	Gascoyne	
917	Suomi Island	28°42′45″S 113°50′17″E	Easter Group	Mid West	
918	Survey Island	16°05′40″S 123°26′54″E			
919	Swan Island (Western Australia)	16°21′10″S 123°02′37″E			
920	Sweet Island (4 Island)	28°55′01″S 113°52′17″E	Houtman Abrolhos	Mid West	
921	Table Island	21°36′46″S 114°43′03″E			
922	Table Island	33°54′51″S 122°35′42″E			
923	Talboys Island	16°23′43″S 123°04′01″E			
924	Tallon Island	16°24′57″S 123°07′17″E			
925	Tancred Island	14°20′20″S 125°24′23″E			
926	Tanner Island (Western Australia)	16°05′46″S 123°31′44″E			
927	Tanpanmirri Island	15°05′02″S 125°21′12″E			
928	Tapani Island	28°40′30″S 113°51′16″E	Houtman Abrolhos	Mid West	
929	Tarrant Island	16°06′11″S 123°40′36″E			
930	Tattler Island	28°28′10″S 113°42′22″E	Houtman Abrolhos	Mid West	
931	Taylor Island	33°55′17″S 122°52′17″E	Recherche Archipelago		
932	Tent Island (Western Australia)	21°59′55″S 114°30′52″E			
933	Termination Island	34°28′19″S 121°59′25″E			
934	Termite Hummocks	16°14′00″S 128°44′29″E			
935	Tern Island (Western Australia)	30°18′52″S 114°59′32″E			
936	Thais Island	14°57′40″S 125°09′31″E			
937	The Island (Western Australia)	27°38′09″S 117°52′29″E			
938	The Pelicans	16°10′05″S 128°42′56″E			
939	The Piccaninnies	16°07′26″S 123°37′04″E			
940	The Sisters (Western Australia)	16°09′08″S 123°49′44″E			
941	Thevenard Island	21°27′28″S 114°59′13″E		Pilbara	
942	Third Sister	28°29′46″S 113°44′23″E	Houtman Abrolhos	Mid West	
943	Thomas Island	33°58′36″S 121°59′01″E			
944	Thomas Island	34°17′24″S 115°10′00″E			
945	Three Bays Island	26°33′15″S 113°38′46″E	Shark Bay	Gascoyne	
946	Thringa Island	21°18′33″S 115°39′31″E		Pilbara	
947	Tide Rip Islands	16°18′07″S 123°18′05″E			
948	Tidepole Island	20°38′57″S 116°42′18″E			
949	Titree Island	31°05′29″S 116°59′32″E			
950	Tizard Island	34°01′04″S 122°40′52″E			
951	Tjaulingari Island	14°40′00″S 125°08′17″E			
952	Tjungkurakutangari Island	14°48′11″S 125°08′28″E			
953	Tortoise Island	21°34′52″S 114°51′33″E			
954	Tory Islands	34°00′51″S 122°18′23″E			
955	Tournefort Island	14°48′31″S 125°01′47″E			
956	Tozer Island	20°27′25″S 116°50′20″E			
957	Traitors Island	28°29′06″S 113°46′57″E	Houtman Abrolhos	Mid West	
958	Traverse Island	16°14′45″S 124°06′47″E			
959	Travia Island	28°51′52″S 113°59′12″E	Houtman Abrolhos	Mid West	
960	Tree Island (Western Australia)	16°23′16″S 123°18′28″E			
961	Tree Island (Western Australia)	16°39′24″S 123°28′50″E			
962	Trimouille Island	20°23′45″S 115°33′44″E	Montebello Islands	Pilbara	
963	Trochus Island	14°29′10″S 125°29′26″E			
964	Troughton Island	13°45′13″S 126°11′02″E			
965	Tunney Island	33°57′43″S 122°48′44″E			
966	Turbin Island	14°28′38″S 125°00′10″E			
967	Turkey Island (Western Australia)	15°31′37″S 128°22′38″E			
968	Turnstone Island	28°27′09″S 113°42′57″E	Houtman Abrolhos	Mid West	
969	Turtle Islands (Western Australia)	19°53′25″S 118°53′44″E			
970	Twin Islands (Western Australia)	21°31′01″S 115°12′30″E			
971	Twin Islands (Western Australia)	34°56′37″S 118°22′21″E			
972	Tyra Island	16°26′41″S 123°06′09″E			
973	Tyrer Islands	16°17′09″S 123°23′37″E			
974	Umbanganan Island	15°26′21″S 124°36′26″E			
975	Umida Island	16°15′29″S 123°32′16″E			
976	Uncle Island	14°22′27″S 127°50′11″E			
977	Uncle Margie Island	28°52′04″S 113°57′59″E	Houtman Abrolhos	Mid West	
978	Unknown Island (Shark Bay)	26°23′16″S 113°22′16″E	Shark Bay	Gascoyne	
979	Usborne Island	16°06′27″S 123°38′30″E			
980	Uwins Island	15°15′57″S 124°49′02″E			
981	Valentine Island	17°05′11″S 123°19′26″E			
982	Vampire Island	20°41′16″S 117°11′03″E			
983	Varanus Island	20°39′03″S 115°34′27″E	Lowendal Islands	Pilbara	
984	Verco Island	16°16′48″S 123°25′32″E			
985	Vickery Island	16°29′09″S 123°20′46″E			
986	Victor Island	21°55′20″S 114°25′48″E			
987	Viney Island	16°00′50″S 124°00′49″E			
988	Violet Island	20°23′24″S 115°34′39″E	Montebello Islands	Pilbara	
989	Vulcan Island (Western Australia)	15°14′05″S 124°23′13″E			
990	Vulcan Islands	15°14′11″S 124°23′30″E			
991	Wailgwin Island	15°31′55″S 124°24′00″E			
992	Walcott Island	20°39′34″S 116°57′32″E			
993	Walker Island (Western Australia)	14°18′00″S 125°18′51″E			
994	Wall Island (Western Australia)	16°22′14″S 123°22′27″E			
995	Wallabi Group	28°28′02″S 113°42′22″E	Houtman Abrolhos	Mid West	
996	Wallace Island	32°00′48″S 115°33′12″E			
997	Wangania Island	16°01′42″S 123°32′27″E			
998	Wann Island	28°28′19″S 113°45′45″E	Houtman Abrolhos	Mid West	
999	Waring Island	15°00′53″S 124°47′48″E			
1000	Warn Island	14°20′07″S 125°18′48″E			
1001	Water Island (Western Australia)	14°21′02″S 125°29′31″E			
1002	Waterlow Islands	16°26′02″S 123°05′12″E			
1003	Webb Island	29°58′36″S 114°57′33″E			
1004	Wedge Island (Western Australia)	30°49′46″S 115°11′12″E			
1005	Weerdee Island	20°19′16″S 118°27′30″E			
1006	Weld Island	21°23′15″S 115°32′28″E			
1007	West Governor Island	13°56′45″S 126°41′08″E			
1008	West Group (Western Australia)	34°01′29″S 121°36′39″E			
1009	West Intercourse Island	20°42′31″S 116°36′21″E			
1010	West Island (Lacepede Islands)	16°51′15″S 122°06′28″E	Lacepede Islands	Kimberley	
	West Island (Ashmore and Cartier Islands)	12°15′00″S 123°05′00″E	Ashmore Reef		
1011	West Island (Western Australia)	12°10′01″S 096°49′18″E	Cocos (Keeling) Islands		
1012	West Island (Western Australia)	21°18′39″S 115°26′50″E			
1013	West Island (Western Australia)	34°04′59″S 120°28′59″E			
1014	West Lewis Island	20°35′28″S 116°37′31″E			
1015	West Lyons Island	25°02′37″S 115°05′57″E	Kennedy Range National Park		Gascoyne Junction
1016	West Mid Intercourse Island	20°40′37″S 116°39′14″E			
1017	West Montalivet Island	14°18′13″S 125°13′11″E		Kimberley	
1018	West Moore Island	20°38′24″S 117°40′07″E			
1019	West Roe Island	16°21′52″S 123°11′13″E			
1020	West Wallabi Island	28°28′03″S 113°41′12″E	Wallabi Group	Mid West	
1021	Westall Island	34°04′50″S 122°57′56″E	Recherche Archipelago		
1022	Whaleback Island	33°44′40″S 124°05′12″E			
1023	Whalebone Island	22°11′51″S 114°22′23″E			
1024	Wharton Island	33°59′30″S 122°42′49″E			
1025	Whipp Island	16°29′41″S 123°22′04″E			
1026	Whirl Island	16°26′04″S 123°07′42″E			
1027	White Bank	28°42′10″S 113°46′30″E	Houtman Abrolhos	Mid West	
1028	White Island (Houtman Abrolhos)	28°40′16″S 113°52′30″E	Houtman Abrolhos	Mid West	
1029	White Island (Shark Bay)	26°26′38″S 113°45′41″E	Shark Bay	Gascoyne	
1030	White Island (Western Australia)	14°11′42″S 125°49′24″E			
1031	White Island (Western Australia)	15°03′44″S 124°19′28″E			
1032	White Island (Western Australia)	34°57′00″S 117°58′35″E			
1033	Whitley Island	14°56′10″S 124°41′37″E			
1034	Whitlock Island (Shark Bay)	24°53′14″S 113°38′44″E	Shark Bay	Gascoyne	
1035	Whitlock Island	30°19′12″S 114°59′32″E			
1036	Whitmore Island (Shark Bay)	24°52′00″S 113°37′20″E	Shark Bay	Gascoyne	
1037	Whitmore Island	22°22′18″S 114°11′53″E			
1038	Whittaker Island	20°32′35″S 116°40′38″E			
1039	Whittell Island	30°39′55″S 115°06′30″E			
1040	Wickham Island (Kimberley coast)	15°00′28″S 124°47′07″E		Kimberley	
1041	Wickham Island (Recherche Archipelago)	34°01′16″S 123°17′23″E	Recherche Archipelago		
1042	Wiiluntju Island	14°25′54″S 125°30′30″E			
1043	Wiirra Island	14°34′55″S 125°13′25″E			
1044	Wilcox Island	20°27′02″S 116°50′22″E			
1045	Wilds Island	26°27′06″S 113°36′54″E	Shark Bay	Gascoyne	
1046	Wilson Island (Shark Bay)	26°09′55″S 113°39′33″E	Shark Bay	Gascoyne	
1047	Wilson Island (Recherche Archipelago)	34°06′57″S 121°59′40″E	Recherche Archipelago		
1048	Winyalkan Island	14°33′16″S 125°25′35″E			
1049	Wollaston Island	14°29′44″S 125°27′29″E			
1050	Woninjaba Islands	16°14′13″S 124°05′13″E			
1051	Wood Islands (Western Australia)	16°23′22″S 123°19′31″E			
1052	Wooded Island	28°45′07″S 113°48′20″E	Easter Group	Mid West	
1053	Woodward Island	14°51′09″S 124°43′55″E			
1054	Woody Island (Western Australia)	33°57′43″S 122°00′40″E	Recherche Archipelago		
1055	Worallgarook Island	32°35′06″S 115°45′57″E			
1056	Wulajarlu Island	15°57′16″S 124°18′13″E			
1057	Wulalam Island	16°23′07″S 124°14′08″E			
1058	Wurauwulla Island	14°39′47″S 125°07′47″E			
1059	Wuwirriya Island	14°33′22″S 125°16′44″E			
1060	Wybron Islands	16°27′42″S 123°20′43″E			
1061	Y Island	21°57′13″S 114°25′06″E		Pilbara	
1062	Yambaraba Island	16°09′05″S 128°43′47″E			
1063	Yammadery Island	21°30′50″S 115°26′08″E			
1064	Yankawingarri Island	14°09′23″S 125°39′23″E			
1065	Yawajaba Island	15°57′38″S 124°12′18″E		Kimberley	
1066	York Islands	34°00′21″S 122°35′09″E			
1067	Yunderup Island	32°35′06″S 115°46′16″E			
	Atriplex Island	20.43667°S 115.50583°E	Montebello Islands	Pilbara	
	Avicennia Island	20.50778°S 115.54028°E	Montebello Islands	Pilbara	
	Banksia Island	20.40278°S 115.515°E	Montebello Islands	Pilbara	
	Beaufortia Island	20.4025°S 115.52361°E	Montebello Islands	Pilbara	
	Birthday Island	20.38472°S 115.51694°E	Montebello Islands	Pilbara	
	Bloodwood Island	20.51583°S 115.52833°E	Montebello Islands	Pilbara	
	Boab Island	20.51472°S 115.52328°E	Montebello Islands	Pilbara	
	Boronia Island	20.39194°S 115.51389°E	Montebello Islands	Pilbara	
	Cajuput Island	20.39472°S 115.53472°E	Montebello Islands	Pilbara	
	Caladenia Island	20.42722°S 115.52667°E	Montebello Islands	Pilbara	
	Callitris Island	20.49667°S 115.56083°E	Montebello Islands	Pilbara	
	Capporis Island	20.4325°S 115.51889°E	Montebello Islands	Pilbara	
	Cassia Island	20.42222°S 115.57694°E	Montebello Islands	Pilbara	
	Clematis Island	20.52028°S 115.54694°E	Montebello Islands	Pilbara	
	Coolibah Island	20.52944°S 115.54167°E	Montebello Islands	Pilbara	
	Corkwood Islands	20.51028°S 115.525°E	Montebello Islands	Pilbara	
	Drosera Island	20.50944°S 115.52°E	Montebello Islands	Pilbara	
	Dryandra Island	20.51222°S 115.53111°E	Montebello Islands	Pilbara	
	Eremophila Island	20.5375°S 115.53972°E	Montebello Islands	Pilbara	
	Euphorbia Island	20.43444°S 115.51833°E	Montebello Islands	Pilbara	
	Fairy Tern Island	20.40722°S 115.51667°E	Montebello Islands	Pilbara	
	Fig Islands	20.50167°S 115.55889°E	Montebello Islands	Pilbara	
	Frankenia Island	20.37694°S 115.52139°E	Montebello Islands	Pilbara	
	Glossypium Island	20.51306°S 115.545°E	Montebello Islands	Pilbara	
	Goodenia Island	20.42694°S 115.51167°E	Montebello Islands	Pilbara	
	Grevillea Island	20.51944°S 115.54361°E	Montebello Islands	Pilbara	
	Hakea Islands	20.45222°S 115.60639°E	Montebello Islands	Pilbara	
	Hibbertia Island	20.38667°S 115.53083°E	Montebello Islands	Pilbara	
	Hibiscus Island	20.38917°S 115.51833°E	Montebello Islands	Pilbara	
	Hovea Island	20.44056°S 115.51361°E	Montebello Islands	Pilbara	
	Ipomoea Island	20.43°S 115.52417°E	Montebello Islands	Pilbara	
	Jarrah Islands	20.39472°S 115.53139°E	Montebello Islands	Pilbara	
	Jasmine Islands	20.38667°S 115.53333°E	Montebello Islands	Pilbara	
	Karara Island	20.40056°S 115.53333°E	Montebello Islands	Pilbara	
	Karri Islands	20.38111°S 115.51444°E	Montebello Islands	Pilbara	
	Kennedia Island	20.505°S 115.53306°E	Montebello Islands	Pilbara	
	Kingia Island	20.40111°S 115.53222°E	Montebello Islands	Pilbara	
	Kunzea Island	20.42167°S 115.5275°E	Montebello Islands	Pilbara	
	Kurrajong Island	20.44083°S 115.53861°E	Montebello Islands	Pilbara	
	Leschenaultia Island	20.41333°S 115.5425°E	Montebello Islands	Pilbara	
	Livistona Island	20.53111°S 115.53528°E	Montebello Islands	Pilbara	
	Lobelia Island	20.42861°S 115.57556°E	Montebello Islands	Pilbara	
	Marri Islands	20.38389°S 115.52361°E	Montebello Islands	Pilbara	
	Melaleuca Island	20.41639°S 115.52444°E	Montebello Islands	Pilbara	
	Minnieritchie Islands	20.46778°S 115.57528°E	Montebello Islands	Pilbara	
	Mistletoe Island	20.3825°S 115.52083°E	Montebello Islands	Pilbara	
	Mulga Islands	20.51111°S 115.52194°E	Montebello Islands	Pilbara	
	Myoporum Island	20.46111°S 115.57917°E	Montebello Islands	Pilbara	
	Patersonia Island	20.3675°S 115.51417°E	Montebello Islands	Pilbara	
	Pimelea Island	20.42861°S 115.57528°E	Montebello Islands	Pilbara	
	Ptilotus Island	20.46722°S 115.51833°E	Montebello Islands	Pilbara	
	Quandong Islands	20.45167°S 115.58056°E	Montebello Islands	Pilbara	
	Renewal Island	20.46722°S 115.54889°E	Montebello Islands	Pilbara	
	Rhagodia Island	20.44083°S 115.57944°E	Montebello Islands	Pilbara	
	Santalum Island	20.43889°S 115.50917°E	Montebello Islands	Pilbara	
	Senna Island	20.42278°S 115.57694°E	Montebello Islands	Pilbara	
	Sesbania Island	20.36806°S 115.52°E	Montebello Islands	Pilbara	
	Sida Island	20.47361°S 115.53722°E	Montebello Islands	Pilbara	
	Snakewood Island	20.50861°S 115.52917°E	Montebello Islands	Pilbara	
	Snappy Gum Island	20.51889°S 115.52833°E	Montebello Islands	Pilbara	
	Solanum Island	20.51917°S 115.53111°E	Montebello Islands	Pilbara	
	Spinifex Island	20.41917°S 115.51944°E	Montebello Islands	Pilbara	
	Stylidium Island	20.42972°S 115.5175°E	Montebello Islands	Pilbara	
	Swainsona Island	20.50667°S 115.52833°E	Montebello Islands	Pilbara	
	Triodia Island	20.43861°S 115.51222°E	Montebello Islands	Pilbara	
	Verticordia Island	20.43472°S 115.57972°E	Montebello Islands	Pilbara	

== See also ==
- Coastal regions of Western Australia
- List of islands of Western Australia
- List of islands of Western Australia, 0–9, A–C
- List of islands of Western Australia, D–G
- List of islands of Western Australia, H–L
- List of islands of Western Australia, M–Q
- List of islands of Western Australia, R–T
- List of islands of Western Australia, U–Z
