= Islands of the Kimberley (Western Australia) =

Location of the Kimberley region in Western Australia

The Islands of the Kimberley are a group of over 2,500 islands lying off the coast of the Kimberley region of Western Australia. The islands extend from the Western Australia–Northern Territory border in the east to just north of Broome in the west.

== North-West Kimberley Islands 1970s survey ==
In 1971, 1972, 1973 a series of biological surveys were carried out.

=== 1971 visit ===
The list is in the order of visits in August 1971.

- Middle Osborn
- Fenelon
- Borda
- South West Osborn
- Low rocks
- Sir Graham Moore
- Louis
- North Eclipse
- Augustus
- Darcy
- Champagny
- Uwins
- Commerson
- Coronation
- Bigge

== Kimberley Islands Biological Survey ==
A biological survey of 22 of the islands was conducted between December 2006 and December 2010 by the Department of Environment and Conservation, traditional owners, the Australian Museum and the Western Australian Museum.

The partnership with the Kimberley Land Council is important as the islands sampled in this survey are covered by five native title claim groups: Balanggarra, Uunguu, Dambimangari, Mayala and Bardi Jawi. Traditional owners have strong management rights to the islands through native title and Aboriginal Reserve tenure.

== See also ==
- Buccaneer Archipelago – Archipelago of the Western Australian Kimberley coast
- Sortable list of islands of Western Australia
