= Booby (disambiguation) =

A booby is a type of seabird. Booby, boobie, or boobies may also refer to:

== Slang ==
- Breast

== Places ==
- Booby Island (Queensland), Queensland, Australia
- Booby Island (Kimberley), Western Australia
- Booby Island (Saint Kitts and Nevis)
- Booby Island, a mile offshore of (but not officially claimed by) Saint George Basseterre Parish
- Booby Cay, one of the three Swan Islands, Honduras
- Booby Pond, Cayman Islands - see Booby Pond Nature Reserve

== Nickname ==
- Boobie Clark (1949–1988), American National Football League player
- Russell Clark (criminal) (1898–1968), American thief, bank robber and prison escapee nicknamed "Boobie"
- Anthony Dixon (born 1987), American National Football League player nicknamed "Boobie"
- Boobie Feaster (born 2009), American football player
- Daniel Gibson (born 1986), American National Basketball Association player nicknamed "Booby" or "Boobie"
- Boobie Miles (born 1970), American high school football player

== Other uses ==
- Sir Thomas Booby and Lady Booby, characters in the novel Joseph Andrews

== See also ==
- Booby's Bay, Cornwall, UK
- Booby trap, a device intended to harm a person who triggers it
- Booby prize, a type of humorous prize
- Booby Island (disambiguation)
- Boob (disambiguation)
- Bubi (disambiguation)
- Bobby (disambiguation)
