= List of named islands in the Montebello Islands archipelago =

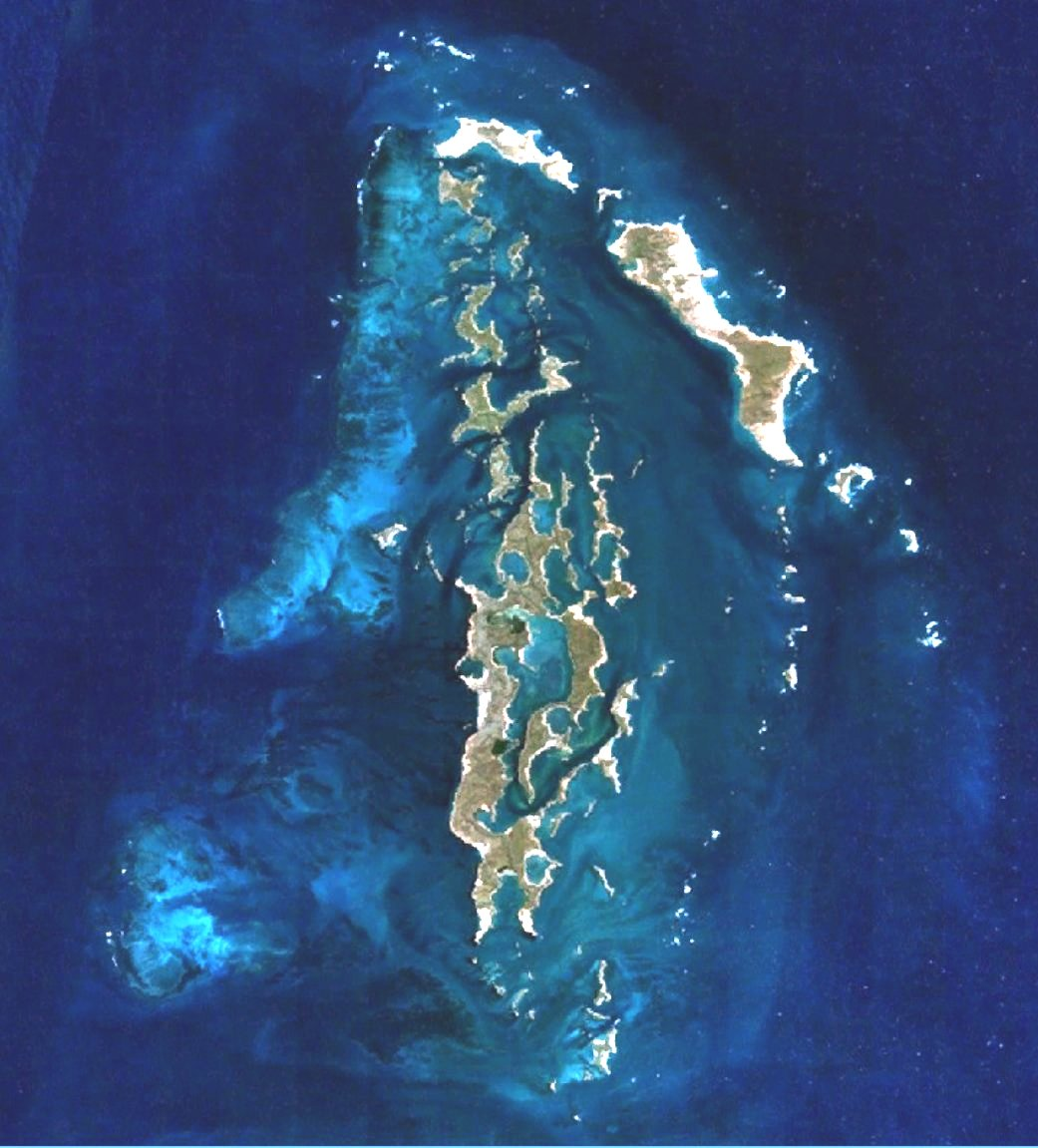
NASA World Wind satellite image of main Montebello Island group

The Montebello Islands is an archipelago lying off the Pilbara coast of north-western Western Australia.

There are about 180 islands in the group, most of which are small, and many of which have not been individually named or gazetted.

The largest islands are Hermite (1,022 hectares or 2,530 acres) and Trimouille (522 hectares or 1,290 acres) which, together, comprise about 70% of the collective land area.

== Islands ==
Name	Coordinates	Reference
Ah Chong Island	20.52389°S 115.54333°E	
Alpha Island	20.40972°S 115.5225°E	
Aster Island	20.43°S 115.57889°E	
Atriplex Island	20.43667°S 115.50583°E	
Avicennia Island	20.50778°S 115.54028°E	
Banksia Island	20.40278°S 115.515°E	
Beaufortia Island	20.4025°S 115.52361°E	
Birthday Island	20.38472°S 115.51694°E	
Bloodwood Island	20.51583°S 115.52833°E	
Bluebell Island	20.39722°S 115.52056°E	
Boab Island	20.51472°S 115.52328°E	
Boronia Island	20.39194°S 115.51389°E	
Brooke Island	20.43389°S 115.50306°E	
Buttercup Island	20.485°S 115.53556°E	
Cajuput Island	20.39472°S 115.53472°E	
Caladenia Island	20.42722°S 115.52667°E	
Callitris Island	20.49667°S 115.56083°E	
Campbell Island	20.42806°S 115.54472°E	
Capparis Island	20.4325°S 115.51889°E	
Carnation Island	20.37806°S 115.52361°E	
Cassia Island	20.42222°S 115.57694°E	
Clematis Island	20.52028°S 115.54694°E	
Coolibah Island	20.52944°S 115.54167°E	
Corkwood Islands	20.51028°S 115.525°E	
Crocus Island	20.42167°S 115.52528°E	
Dahlia Island	20.42889°S 115.57889°E	
Daisy Island	20.43917°S 115.58056°E	
Dandelion Island	20.43194°S 115.57972°E	
Delta Island	20.4425°S 115.54806°E	
Dot Island	20.43583°S 115.58028°E	
Drosera Island	20.50944°S 115.52°E	
Dryandra Island	20.51222°S 115.53111°E	
Epsilon Island	20.44472°S 115.58056°E	
Eremophila Island	20.5375°S 115.53972°E	
Euphorbia Island	20.43444°S 115.51833°E	
Fairy Tern Island	20.40722°S 115.51667°E	
Fig Island	20.50167°S 115.55889°E	
Flag Island	20.45806°S 115.58056°E	
Foxglove Island	20.48222°S 115.54222°E	
Frankenia Island	20.37694°S 115.52139°E	
Gannet Island	20.44667°S 115.56861°E	
Gardenia Island	20.38278°S 115.52833°E	
Glossypium Island	20.51306°S 115.545°E	
Goodenia Island	20.42694°S 115.51167°E	
Grevillea Island	20.51944°S 115.54361°E	
Hakea Islands	20.45222°S 115.60639°E	
Hermite Island	20.46667°S 115.52472°E	
Hibbertia Island	20.38667°S 115.53083°E	
Hibiscus Island	20.38917°S 115.51833°E	
Hollyhock Island	20.3775°S 115.54778°E	
Hovea Island	20.44056°S 115.51361°E	
How Island	20.41944°S 115.55417°E	
Ipomoea Island	20.43°S 115.52417°E	
Ivy Island	20.49389°S 115.54472°E	
Jarrah Islands	20.39472°S 115.53139°E	
Jasmine Islands	20.38667°S 115.53333°E	
Jonquil Island	20.39722°S 115.5325°E	
Karangi Island	20.43361°S 115.60361°E	
Karara Island	20.40056°S 115.53333°E	
Karri Islands	20.38111°S 115.51444°E	
Kennedia Island	20.505°S 115.53306°E	
Kingcup Island	20.39056°S 115.53222°E	
Kingia Island	20.40111°S 115.53222°E	
Kunzea Island	20.42167°S 115.5275°E	
Kurrajong Island	20.44083°S 115.53861°E	
Leschenaultia Island	20.41333°S 115.5425°E	
Lily Island	20.41972°S 115.58694°E	
Livistona Island	20.53111°S 115.53528°E	
Lobelia Island	20.42861°S 115.57556°E	
Marigold Island	20.45806°S 115.55556°E	
Marri Islands	20.38389°S 115.52361°E	
Melaleuca Island	20.41639°S 115.52444°E	
Minnieritchie Islands	20.46778°S 115.57528°E	
Mistletoe Island	20.3825°S 115.52083°E	
Mulga Islands	20.51111°S 115.52194°E	
Myoporum Island	20.46111°S 115.57917°E	
North West Island	20.36278°S 115.52583°E	
Pansy Island	20.37389°S 115.54472°E	
Patersonia Island	20.3675°S 115.51417°E	
Pimelea Island	20.42861°S 115.57528°E	
Primrose Island	20.37083°S 115.51611°E	
Ptilotus Island	20.46722°S 115.51833°E	
Quandong Islands	20.45167°S 115.58056°E	
Renewal Island	20.46722°S 115.54889°E	
Rhagodia Island	20.44083°S 115.57944°E	
Rose Island	20.42167°S 115.55111°E	
Santalum Island	20.43889°S 115.50917°E	
Senna Island	20.42278°S 115.57694°E	
Sesbania Island	20.36806°S 115.52°E	
Sida Island	20.47361°S 115.53722°E	
Snakewood Island	20.50861°S 115.52917°E	
Snappy Gum Island	20.51889°S 115.52833°E	
Solanum Island	20.51917°S 115.53111°E	
South East Island	20.42306°S 115.59028°E	
Spar Island	20.48639°S 115.56361°E	
Spinifex Island	20.41917°S 115.51944°E	
Stylidium Island	20.42972°S 115.5175°E	
Swainsona Island	20.50667°S 115.52833°E	
Triodia Island	20.43861°S 115.51222°E	
Trimouille Island	20.39472°S 115.56389°E	
Verticordia Island	20.43472°S 115.57972°E	
Violet Island	20.38889°S 115.57917°E	
