= Bossiaea zarae =

Princess May winged pea

Conservation status
- Priority Three — Poorly Known Taxa (DEC)

Scientific classification
- Kingdom: Plantae
- Clade: Tracheophytes
- Clade: Angiosperms
- Clade: Eudicots
- Clade: Rosids
- Order: Fabales
- Family: Fabaceae
- Subfamily: Faboideae
- Genus: Bossiaea
- Species: B. zarae

Binomial name
- Bossiaea zarae R.L.Barrett

Species of legume

Bossiaea zarae, commonly known as Princess May winged pea, is a species of flowering plant in the pea family Fabaceae and is endemic to the northern Kimberley region of Western Australia. It is an erect shrub with winged stems, winged cladodes, scale-like leaves and yellow, and reddish-brown flowers.

== Description ==
Bossiaea zarae is an erect shrub that typically grows up to 2.2 m (7 ft 3 in) high and 1.2 m (3 ft 11 in) wide. The stems are flattened, winged and up to 11 mm (0.43 in) wide, ending in winged cladodes 1.9–3.4 mm (0.075–0.134 in) wide. The leaves are reduced to dark brown, narrow egg-shaped scales, 1.1–2.0 mm (0.043–0.079 in) long. The flowers are arranged singly or in pairs on pedicels 1.5–5.8 mm (0.059–0.228 in) long with overlapping, narrow egg-shaped bracts up to 2.1 mm (0.083 in) long at the base and narrow egg-shaped bracteoles about 1 mm (0.039 in) long attached to the pedicels. The sepals are 5.3–7.0 mm (0.21–0.28 in) long and joined at the base forming a tube, the two upper lobes 1.7–2.5 mm (0.067–0.098 in) long and the lower three lobes 1.1–1.4 mm (0.043–0.055 in) long. The standard petal is golden yellow with reddish brown marking, a yellow centre and 8.5–12.6 mm (0.33–0.50 in) long, the wings uniformly yellow and 5.3–6.3 mm (0.21–0.25 in) long, the keel yellowish and 12.1–15.4 mm (0.48–0.61 in) long. Flowering has been observed in August and January and the fruit is an oblong pod 43–47 mm (1.7–1.9 in) long.

== Taxonomy and naming ==
Bossiaea zarae was first formally described in 2015 by Russell Lindsay Barrett in the journal Nuytsia from specimens collected on Bigge Island in 2008. The specific epithet (zarae) is from "the Arabic and Hebrew name Zara (meaning princess)", referring to the Princess May Ranges where this species was discovered.

== Distribution and habitat ==
Princess May winged pea grows on sandstone ridges and pavements in low shrubland in the Prince Regent National Park and on Bigge Island in the northern Kimberley region of Western Australia.

== Conservation status ==
This bossiaea is listed as "Priority Three" by the Government of Western Australia Department of Biodiversity, Conservation and Attractions, meaning that it is poorly known and known from only a few locations but is not under imminent threat.
