= Carinotrachia admirale =

Scientific classification
- Kingdom: Animalia
- Phylum: Mollusca
- Class: Gastropoda
- Order: Stylommatophora
- Family: Camaenidae
- Genus: Carinotrachia
- Species: C. admirale

Binomial name
- Carinotrachia admirale Köhler, 2010

Species of gastropod

Carinotrachia admirale is a species of air-breathing land snail, a terrestrial pulmonate gastropod mollusk in the family Camaenidae.

The specific name admirale refers to Admiralty Gulf which is next to the islands where this species lives.

== Subspecies ==
- Carinotrachia admirale admirale Köhler, 2010
- Carinotrachia admirale elevata Köhler, 2010

== Distribution ==
The distribution of Carinotrachia admirale includes Middle and Southwest Osborn Islands.

The type locality of Carinotrachia admirale is Middle Osborn Island, Bonaparte Archipelago in north-western Kimberley, Western Australia.
