= Hecla Island =

Hecla Island may refer to:

- Hecla-Grindstone Provincial Park in Canada
- Hecla Island (Western Australia) 13°58′44″S 125°59′57″E
