= Prince Island =

Prince Island may refer to:

- Prince Island (California) 34°2′N 120°23′W
- Prince Island (Western Australia) 15°13′18″S 128°12′16″E

== See also ==
- Prince Islands, a chain of nine islands off the coast of Istanbul, Turkey
- Prince's Island Park, an urban park in the city of Calgary, Alberta, Canada
- Príncipe, island of the country of São Tomé and Príncipe, once known as Prince's Island
