= Imp Island =

Imp Island may refer to:

- Imp Island (Antarctica), one of the Vardim Rocks
- Imp Island (Western Australia) in the Kimberley region (see Sortable list of islands of Western Australia)
