= Gannet Island =

Gannet Island may refer to:

- Kārewa / Gannet Island, New Zealand 37°58′19″S 174°33′58″E
- Gannet Island (Western Australia) 20°26′52″S 115°34′01″E
- Gannet Islands Ecological Reserve, NE Canada 53.934°N 56.505°W
- Motutākupu / Gannet Island, part of the Motukawao Islands, New Zealand 36.684°N 175.374°E
