= Osprey Island =

Osprey Island may refer to:

== Places ==
- Osprey Island (New York), an island in Blue Mountain Lake, New York.
- Osprey Island (Scotland), an island in Gladhouse Reservoir, Midlothian, Scotland.
- Osprey Island (Western Australia), an island in Western Australia.

== Culture ==
- Osprey Island, a 1974 book by Anne Lindbergh.
- Osprey Island, a 2004 book by Thisbe Nissen.
