= Hibbertia persquamata =

Scientific classification
- Kingdom: Plantae
- Clade: Tracheophytes
- Clade: Angiosperms
- Clade: Eudicots
- Order: Dilleniales
- Family: Dilleniaceae
- Genus: Hibbertia
- Species: H. persquamata

Binomial name
- Hibbertia persquamata Toelken

Synonyms
- Hibbertia complanata Toelken nom. illeg.; Hibbertia echiifolia R.Br. ex Benth.: Wheeler, J.R. (1992)

Species of plant

Hibbertia persquamata is a species of flowering plant in the family Dilleniaceae and is endemic to the Northern Kimberley region of Western Australia. It is a spreading to prostrate shrub with flattened, scaly branches, narrow elliptic leaves and yellow flowers arranged singly in leaf axils with 20 to 26 stamens arranged around three scaly carpels.

== Description ==
Hibbertia persquamata is a spreading to prostrate shrub that typically grows to a height of up to 20 cm (7.9 in) with flattened branches up to 40 cm (16 in) long and foliage covered with shield-like scales. The leaves are narrow elliptic, 30–55 mm (1.2–2.2 in) long and 5–8 mm (0.20–0.31 in) wide on a petiole up to 2.2 mm (0.087 in) long. The flowers are usually arranged singly in leaf axils on the ends of short side shoots on a stiff, thread-like peduncle 5–13 mm (0.20–0.51 in) long, with oblong bracts 3.2–4.9 mm (0.13–0.19 in) long. The five sepals are joined at the base, the outer sepal lobes 6.5–7.5 mm (0.26–0.30 in) long and the inner lobes 8–9 mm (0.31–0.35 in) long. The five petals are egg-shaped with the narrower end towards the base, yellow, 6.8–9.2 mm (0.27–0.36 in) long and there are 20 to 26 stamens of different lengths arranged around three scaly carpels, each carpel two ovules.

== Taxonomy ==
This hibbertia was first formally described in 2010 by Hellmut R. Toelken, and given the name Hibbertia complanata in the Journal of the Adelaide Botanic Gardens from specimens collected in 1992 on Augustus Island. Later in 2010, in a subsequent edition of the Journal of the Adelaide Botanic Gardens, Toelken changed the name to Hibbertia persquamata because the name H. complanata was already in use for a different taxon (H. complanata (R.Br. ex DC.) J.W.Horn). The specific epithet (persquamata) means "densely covered with scales".

Toelken described two subspecies of H. complanata, later changed to subspecies of H. persquamata, and the names are accepted by the Australian Plant Census:

- Hibbertia persquamata subsp. ampliata (Toelken) Toelken has scales 0.5–0.7 mm (0.020–0.028 in) wide on the upper leaf surface and has been observed flowering in January and June;
- Hibbertia persquamata Toelken subsp. persquamata has smaller leaf scales than subspecies ampliata and has been observed flowering in May and June.

== Distribution and habitat ==
Subspecies ampliata grows in grassy eucalypt woodland on the lower Prince Regent River and subspecies persquamata is only known from Augustus Island where it grows in grassy Acacia woodland.

== Conservation status ==
Both subspecies of Hibbertia persquamata are classified as "not threatened" by the Western Australian Government Department of Parks and Wildlife.

== See also ==
- List of Hibbertia species
