= Bubi =

Bubi may refer to:

- Bubi people, an ethnic group in Central Africa
- Bubi language, a Bantu language spoken in Bioko Island, Equatorial Guinea
- Bubi District, Zimbabwe
- Bubi River, a tributary of the Limpopo River in Zimbabwe
- BuBi, a bicycle sharing system in Budapest

== People with the nickname ==
- Josef Bradl (1918–1982), Austrian ski jumper
- Erich Hartmann (1922–1993), German fighter pilot
- Bubi Rohde (1914–1979), German footballer
- Adolf von Thadden (1921–1996), German politician
- Bubi Wallenius (born 1943), Finnish sports commentator

== See also ==
- Booby (disambiguation)
