= Carinotrachia carsoniana =

Conservation status
- Vulnerable (IUCN 2.3)

Scientific classification
- Kingdom: Animalia
- Phylum: Mollusca
- Class: Gastropoda
- Order: Stylommatophora
- Family: Camaenidae
- Genus: Carinotrachia
- Species: C. carsoniana

Binomial name
- Carinotrachia carsoniana Solem, 1985

Species of gastropod

Carinotrachia carsoniana is a species of medium-sized air-breathing land snails, terrestrial pulmonate gastropods in the family Camaenidae. This species is endemic to Australia.
