= Boob =

Boob has these common meanings:

- A slang word for a woman's breast
- An insult for a stupid or foolish person

Boob or Boobs may also refer to:

== Arts and entertainment ==
- The Boob, a 1926 film by William Wellman
- Boobs! The Musical, a revue by Ruth Wallis
- The title character of Boob McNutt, a comic strip by Rube Goldberg which ran from 1915 to 1934
- Jeremy Hillary Boob, a character in the animated movie Yellow Submarine (1968)
- "Boobs" (short story), by Suzy McKee Charnas (1989)

== People ==
- Boob Brasfield (1898–1966), American vaudeville comedian
- Boob Darling (1903–1968), American football player
- Boob Fowler (1900–1988), American Major League Baseball shortstop
- Betty Boob, American feminist writer, editor, and television director and producer Marcelle Karp (born 1964)
- Jo Boobs, American stripper Jo Weldon (born 1962)

== See also ==
- Bob (disambiguation)
- Booby (disambiguation)
