= Booby Island =

Booby Island may refer to

- Booby Island (Western Australia)
- Booby Island (Queensland)
  - Booby Island Light
- Booby Island (Saint Kitts and Nevis), an island off the coast of Saint Kitts and Nevis
- Booby Island (Seychelles)

== See also ==
- Booby Cay, one of the Swan Islands, Honduras
