= Jean-Pierre, Count of Montalivet =

French statesman

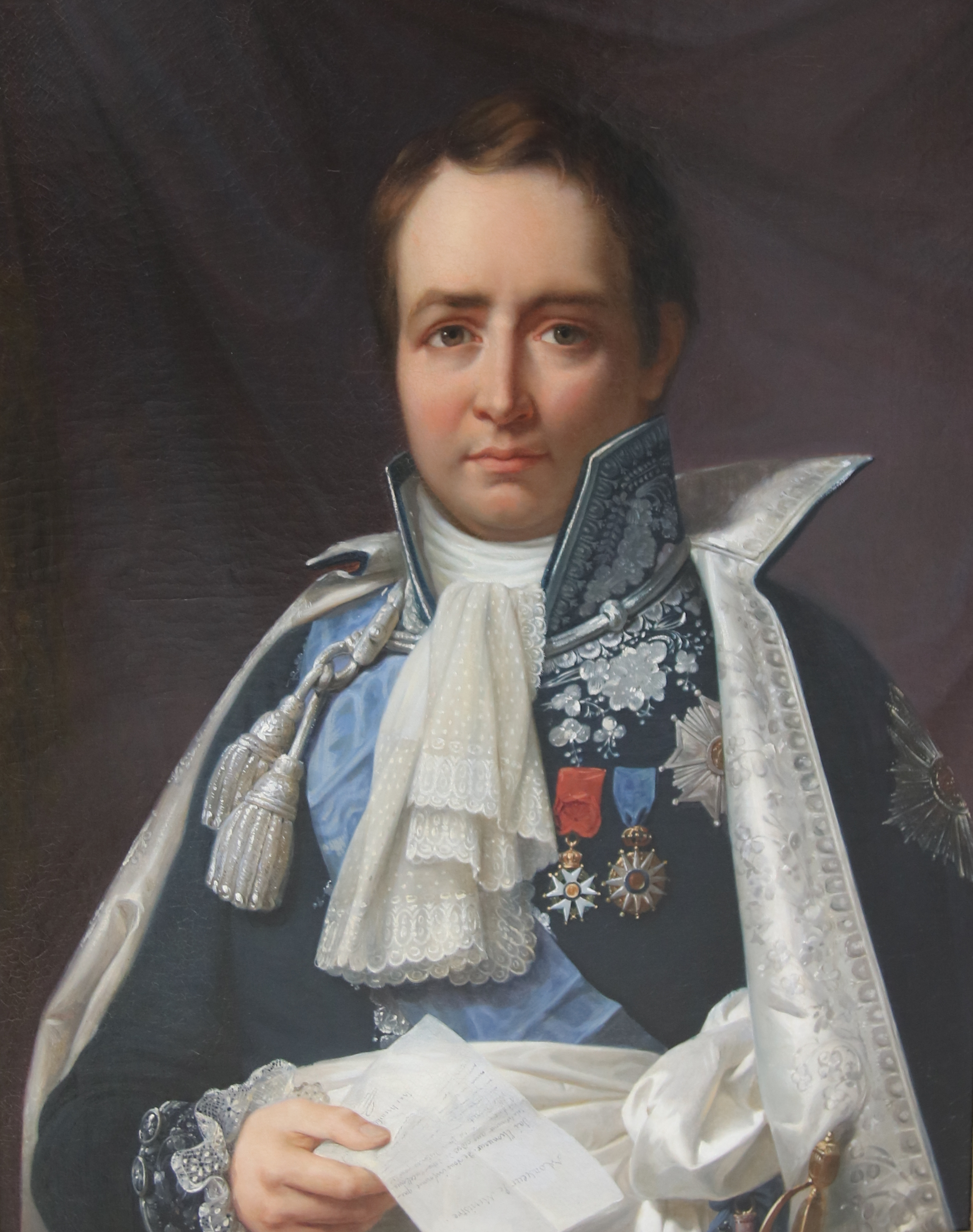
Jean-Pierre Bachasson, count of Montalivet

Jean-Pierre Bachasson, Seigneur and 1st Comte de Montalivet (Neunkirch, now part of Sarreguemines, Moselle, 5 July 1766 – Château de Lagrange, Cher, 22 January 1823) was a French statesman and Peer of France. He was the father of Camille Bachasson, 3rd Count of Montalivet, Minister of the Interior under Louis Philippe I.

== Life ==
=== Early life and Revolution ===
A nobleman born in Sarreguemines the son of Charles Victor Bachasson, Seigneur de Montalivet, Maréchal de camp, Knight of the Order of Saint Louis and Councilor Secretary of the King in the Chancellery of Corsica, etc., and second wife Marthe de Saint-Germain, Noble Femme, he was counsellor to the Grenoble parlement from 1785 to 1790, and, while in Valence, he became friends with Napoleon Bonaparte, who was a young officer at the time. In 1788, during the bloody riots known as the Journée des Tuiles, he took the side of the revolt and was banished to his château in Montmeyran.

Although supportive of the French Revolution, Bachasson enlisted in the Army of Italy in order to escape the Reign of Terror. After his return to France he was elected Mayor of Valence in 1795, and was commissioner for the département of Drôme under the French Directory.

=== Consulate and Empire ===
After his 18 Brumaire coup, Napoleon called Bachasson to serve as préfet of the Manche and then Seine-et-Oise under the Consulate. With the start of the French Empire, Bachasson joined the Conseil d'État, became director of the Legion of Honor, and, from 1806, head of the Corps des Ponts et Chaussées.

He became Minister of the Interior in 1809, during the period when France was at the peak of its European territorial expansion. As Minister, Bachasson helped develop the infrastructure within the Empire by, for example, authorising the construction of new bridges and ports. He also oversaw large-scale urban works in Paris, the building of such monuments as the Arc de Triomphe and the Palais Brongniar, as well as the expansion of sewage works and the digging of public fountains.

=== Restoration, later life, and legacy ===
In 1814, after the Six Days' Campaign, Bachasson accompanied Empress Marie Louise all the way to Blois, and then retired to his property in Montmeyran. He returned to public life during the Hundred Days, and became Intendant General General of the Crown and a Peer. With the start of the Bourbon Restoration, he was denied peerage until 1819. He died in his Castle of Lagrange-Montalivet in Saint-Bouize.

Montalivet Street in Paris, a Montalivet Square in Valence, Montalivet Avenue in Caen, Comte de Montalivet Street in Sarreguemines and the Montalivet Islands in Western Australia, are all named after him.

== Family ==
He married Louise Françoise Adélaïde de Saint-Germain (Versailles, Yvelines, 13 January 1769 – Thauvenay, 10 March 1850), who was said to be a daughter of Louis XV - with whom she shared the same striking resemblance in the strongly marked Bourbon traits also found in other of his illegitimate offspring - by Catherine Eléonore Bernard (1740–1769), and had issue:

- Charles Bachasson de Montalivet (1798–1807)
- Simon Pierre Joseph Bachasson, 2e Comte de Montalivet (1 March 1799 - Girona, 12 October 1823), unmarried and without issue
- Marthe Camille Bachasson, 3rd Comte de Montalivet (1801–1880)
- Pierre Bachasson de Montalivet (Saint-Lô, 2 September 1803 - Paris, 16 June 1817)
- Josephine Francine Adelaïde de Montalivet (23 August 1806 – Thauvenay, 17 June 1852), married on 14 June 1827 Benjamin Marie de Tascher (Orléans, 9 March 1797 - Thauvenay, 25 September 1858), son of Pierre Jean Alexandre, 1st Baron and 1st Comte de Tascher, and wife Catherine Flore Bigot de Chérelles de La Boyerie, and had issue
- Charles Bachasson de Montalivet (Paris, 10 November 1810 - Naples, 27 November 1832), unmarried and without issue

Preceded by Joseph Fouché, duc d'Otrante	French Minister of the Interior; 1809–1814	Succeeded by Jacques, comte Beugnot
