= East Island (Mary Anne Group) =

Island in Western Australia

Coordinates: 21°16′S 115°35′E

East Island is an island in the Mary Anne Group archipelago off the northwest coast of Western Australia. Together With the mangrove islands are part of an island chain in north western coast of western Australia in the Pilbara region.

It was most probably named after the Mary Anne which was shipwrecked in the general vicinity. It is not an inhabited or residential area.
