= Carinotrachia =

Scientific classification
- Kingdom: Animalia
- Phylum: Mollusca
- Class: Gastropoda
- Order: Stylommatophora
- Family: Camaenidae
- Genus: Carinotrachia; Solem, 1985

Genus of gastropods

Carinotrachia is a genus of medium-sized air-breathing land snails, terrestrial pulmonate gastropods in the family Camaenidae.

== Species ==
Species within the genus Carinotrachia include:

- Carinotrachia admirale Köhler, 2010
- Carinotrachia carsoniana Solem, 1985 - the type species
