= South West Osborn Island =

Island in the Kimberley, Western Australia

South West Osborn
- Location within Western Australia

Geography
- Coordinates: 14.35816597°S 125.9508396°E
- Total islands: 1
- Area: 1,339 ha (3,310 acres)
- Highest elevation: 134 m (440 ft)

Administration
- Australia

Demographics
- Population: 0

South West Osborn Island is an island off the coast of the Kimberley region in Western Australia.

Located on the western side of Admiralty Gulf and a part of the Bonaparte Archipelago some 3.1 kilometres (2 mi) off-shore from the mainland, the island encompasses an area of 1,339 hectares (3,309 acres). The highest point of the island has an elevation of 134 metres (440 ft). The island is rugged, composed of massive scree over deep jointed scarp country. It is part of the Osborn Island group which includes, Middle Osborn, Borda, Carlia, Steep Head and Kidney Island as well as West, North and Centre Rock.

The island is home to a small group of fauna including three species of birds, six types of reptile, one species of frog and mammal.

The traditional owners of the area are the Wunambal, whose name for the island is Umpatayi or Umbadayi.
