= Epsilon Island (Western Australia) =

Island in Western Australia

Epsilon Island is one of the Montebello Islands located at 20°26′45″S 115°34′44″E off the Pilbara Coast of Western Australia.

Surrounding islands include:

- Ah Chong Island
- Alpha Island
- Aster Island
- Banksia Island
- Brooke Island
- Buttercup Island
- Campbell Island
- Carnation Island
- Dot Island
- Daisy Island
- Flag Island
- Gannet Island
- Hermite Island
- Marigold Island
- Primrose Island

== See also ==
- List of named islands in the Montebello Islands archipelago
