= Middle Osborn Island =

Island in Kimberley region of Western Australia

Middle Osborn
- Location within Western Australia

Geography
- Coordinates: 14.31822°S 125.0138918°E
- Total islands: 1
- Area: 2,361 ha (5,830 acres)

Administration
- Australia

Demographics
- Population: 0

Middle Osborn Island is an island off the coast of the Kimberley region in Western Australia.

Located on the western side of Admiralty Gulf and a part of the Bonaparte Archipelago, the island encompasses an area of 2,361 hectares (5,834 acres). It is part of the Osborn Island group, which includes South West Osborn, Borda, Carlia, Steep Head and Kidney Island as well as West, North and Centre Rock.

The island is a volcanic plug.

The traditional owners of the area are the Uunguu peoples of the Wunambal language group, whose name for the island is Ngurraali.

The group was named in 1891 by Phillip Parker King after John Osborn, one of the Lords of the Admiralty.

The air-breathing land snails, Kimberleymelon tealei and Carinotrachia admirale are both endemic to the island.

In 2008 a boat carrying refugees that had travelled via Indonesia arrived at the island. The immigration minister, Chris Bowen, was attacked by the opposition over his "porous border protection policies". Another boat arrived in 2010 with only two passengers and one crew on board.
