= Wickham Island (Kimberley coast) =

Island on the coast of Western Australia

Coordinates: 15°00′28″S 124°47′07″E

Wickham Island off the Kimberley coast of Western Australia is a small island in the Timor Sea.
