= Jungulu Island =

Island in Western Australia

Coordinates: 15°17′59″S 124°24′24″E

Location of Jungulu Island (Western Australia)

Jungulu Island is an island off the Kimberley coast of Western Australia. The island is approximately 20 kilometres (12 mi) offshore and only a short distance to the north east of Augustus Island with a total area of about 4,841 hectares (11,962 acres) and is found at the southern end of the Bonaparte Archipelago, part of the Heywood Islands group, in Camden Sound.

The island is often incorrectly called Darcy Island, which is a small island found to the southern side of Jungulu proper.

Although most of the islands in the Kimberley are unallocated DEC crown land, Jungulu is one of islands near the former Kunmunya mission which are included in Reserve 23079 for Use and Benefit of Aborigines.
