= Montalivet Islands =

Islands of the Kimberley, Western Australia

Location of the Montalivet Islands in the Indian Ocean

East Montalivet Island and West Montalivet Island are islands off coast of the Kimberley region, in the state of Western Australia, in the Indian Ocean. They are often referred to together as the Montlivet Islands, although this is not a gazetted name.

They were discovered by French explorer Nicolas Baudin in 1802 amid his expedition to Australia, and named after Jean-Pierre Bachasson, 1st Count of Montalivet (1766–1823), peer of France and French statesman, in the atlas of his expedition.

The locations of the islands are:

- East Montalivet Island: 14°16′S 125°18′E
- West Montalivet Island: 14°18′S 125°13′E
