= St Andrew Island =

Island in Western Australia

St Andrew
- Location within Australia

Geography
- Coordinates: 15.35219169°S 125.0138918°E
- Total islands: 1
- Area: 1,470 ha (3,600 acres)
- Highest elevation: 284 m (932 ft)

Administration
- Australia

Demographics
- Population: 0

St Andrew Island is an uninhabited island located in the Kimberley region of Western Australia.

The island encompasses an area of 1,470 hectares (3,632 acres) and has an elevation of 284 metres (932 ft). The country is sparsely vegetated with shallow jointing, wide ledges and moderate scree. It is located approximately 2.23 kilometres (1 mi) off-shore.

Fauna found on the island include 8 species of bats, 47 birds including the white-bellied sea-eagle and the pied imperial pigeon, 20 types of reptiles, 5 frogs and 4 types of native mammal.
