= Mistaken Island =

Island in Western Australia

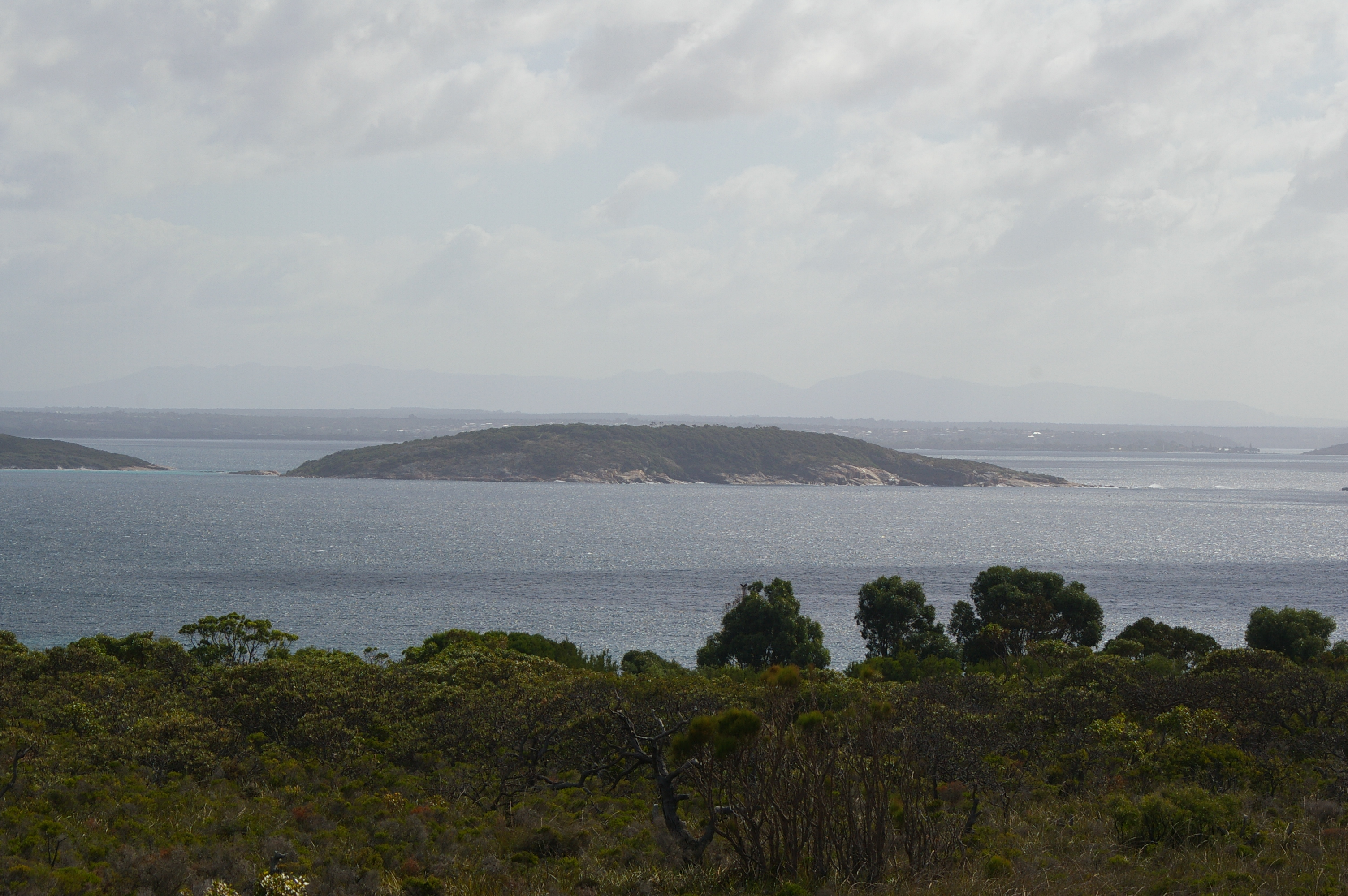
- Mistaken Island from near Goode Beach

Geography
- Coordinates: 35°3′45″S 117°56′37″E

Administration
- Australia

Mistaken Island is an island located approximately 5 kilometres (3 mi) south-east of Albany, Western Australia.

Located in King George Sound the island is located approximately 120 metres (394 ft) from Vancouver peninsula.

There is evidence that shore-based bay whaling activities were conducted on the island in the 19th century.

In 1971, the island was declared as a class 1A Nature Reserve with a total area of 12 hectares (30 acres). The area adjacent to the island is used to cultivate mussels on long lines on licenses issued by the Department of fisheries and leases issued by the Albany Port Authority.

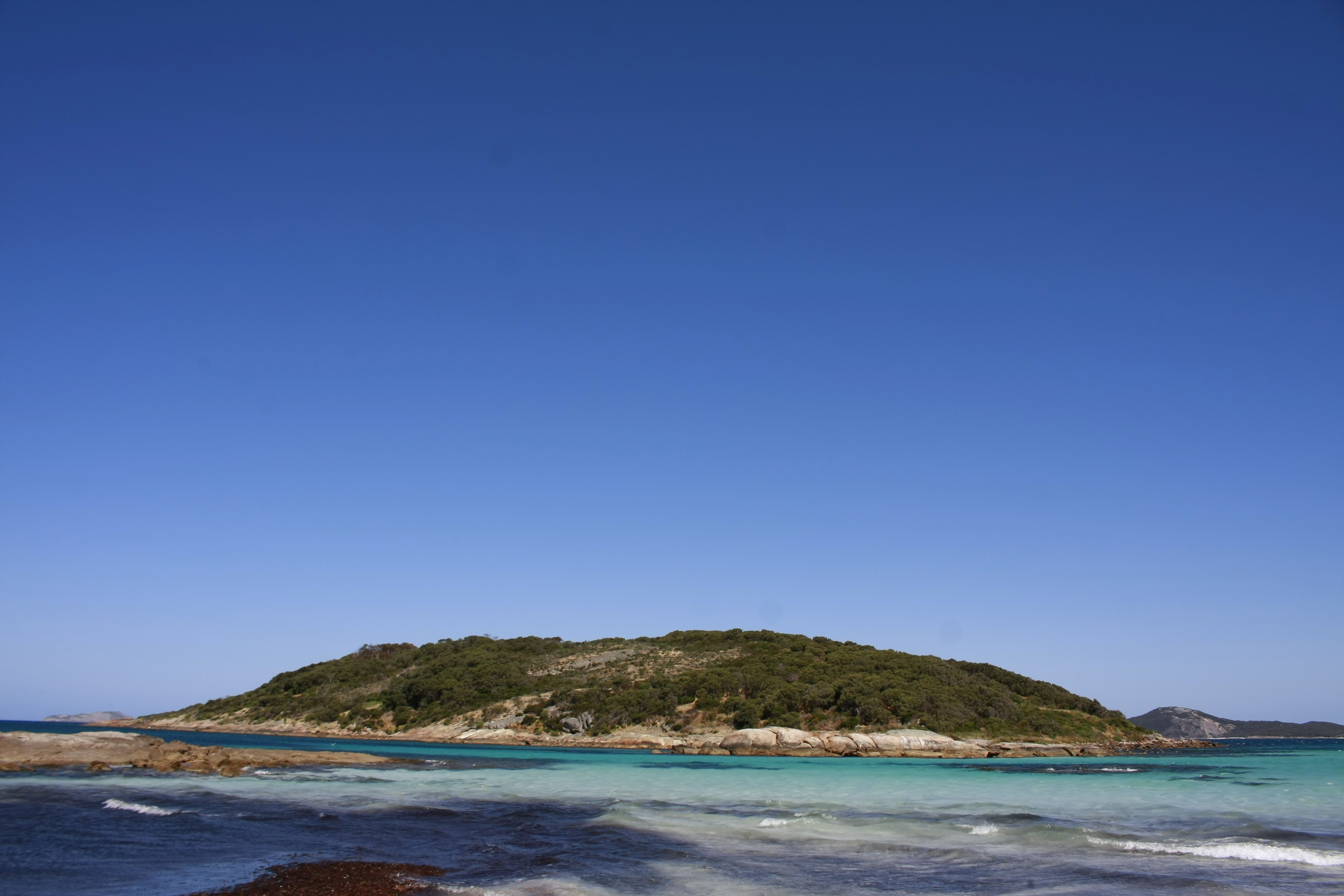
From the adjoining beach on Vancouver Peninsula

== Little penguin colony ==
The island received its name for the little penguin (Eudyptula minor) burrows which were mistaken for rabbit holes and the island has also been historically referred to as Rabbit Island. In 1936 and 1938, the penguins of Mistaken Island became victims of deliberately lit fires. Following the latter event, some were discovered with their feet "burned off". As of 2011, the penguin colony on Mistaken Island is the subject of scientific study.
