= Bigge Island =

Island in Kimberley region of Western Australia

Coordinates: 14°35′20″S 125°09′11″E

Location of Bigge Island

Bigge Island is an island off the coast of the Kimberley region in Western Australia, within the Shire of Wyndham-East Kimberley.

The island lies approximately 6 kilometres (4 mi) from the mainland, from which it is separated by Scott Strait. It is located between York Sound and Montague Sound and approximately 10 nautical miles (12 mi) north of Cape Pond.

Bigge Island is the second largest island of the Bonaparte Archipelago (after Augustus Island) and has a total area of 178 square kilometres (69 sq mi). It has an irregular shape with a length of 22 kilometres (14 mi) and a width of 6 kilometres (4 mi). The island has many shallow reef-strewn bays around its heavily indented coastline on all four sides. Boomerang Bay is the largest bay and is found on the western coast of the island.

Geologically, the island is composed of weathered sandstones and dolerites forming a rugged terrain. The island is criss-crossed by many deep grooves and fissures in the rock, forming valleys and fissures which support the island's vegetation. The highest point on the island is Savage Hill on the south coast opposite Scott Strait, at 143 metres (469 ft); the northernmost point is Cape Chateaurenaud. Islands surrounding Bigge Island include Prudhoe Island, Purrungku Island, Capstan Island and the Maret Islands.

The traditional owners of the area are the Uunguu people of the Wunambal language group, whose name for the island is Wuyurru. Indigenous Australian rock art exists on the cliffs and cave walls around Wary Bay. The paintings include examples of first contact art and Wandjina figures. The rock art was created by the Wunambal people.

The lack of feral predators makes the island an ideal habitat for vulnerable mammal species such as the monjon, the ilangnalya and the northern quoll.
