= Prince Island (Western Australia) =

Island in Western Australia

Prince Island (15°13′18″S 128°12′16″E) is located in the Ord River in the Kimberley region of Western Australia.
