= Banksia Island =

Island in Western Australia

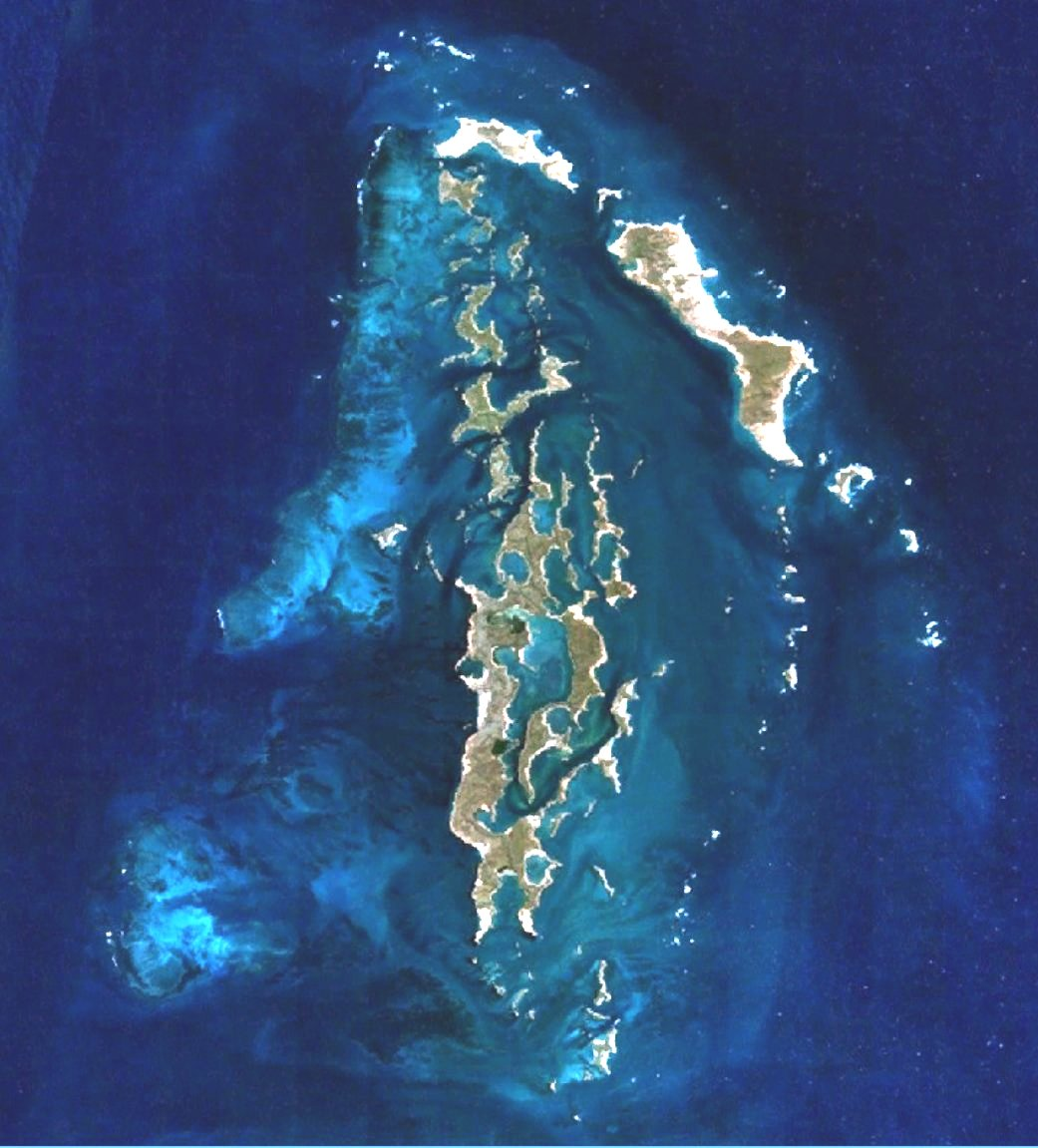

Banksia Island is a small island in the Montebello Islands, off the north-west coast of Western Australia. It is located at 20°24′S 115°30′E. It is thought to be the "Banks Island" upon which the dipterist John Russell Malloch collected the type specimen for Lamprogaster indistincta, a species of signal fly, in 1928.
