= Mary Anne Group =

Island in Western Australia

- Location within Western Australia

Geography
- Location: Indian Ocean
- Coordinates: 21°18′S 115°32′E

Administration
- Australia
- State: Western Australia

The Mary Anne Group is an archipelago off the north west coast of Western Australia, nominally located at 21º17'S 115º30'E. Together with the Mangrove Islands and Passage Islands, it is part of a long chain of near-shore islands stretching from the vicinity of Onslow to the mouth of the Fortescue River.

It is presumably named after the Mary Anne, which was shipwrecked in the area in 1870.
