= Hecla Island (Western Australia) =

Island in Western Australia

Hecla Island (13°58′44″S 125°59′57″E) is located off the Kimberley coast of Western Australia.
