= Uwins Island =

Island of Kimberley coast in Western Australia

Coordinates: 15°15′58″S 124°49′13″E

Location of Uwins Island

Uwins Island is located off the Kimberley coast of Western Australia.

The island encompasses an area of 3,247 hectares (8,024 acres) and is located in the Bonaparte Archipelago to the east of Hanover Bay and the west of Munster Water. Small area of mangroves, Avicennia marina and Ceriops tagal, are found on the island.

Threatened and priority fauna found on the island include the northern quoll, golden bandicoot, and golden-backed tree-rat.

The little rock-wallaby and the warabi both of which are little known on the mainland are also both found on the island.
