= Coronation Island (Western Australia) =

Island in Western Australia

Coordinates: 14°59′34″S 124°55′20″E

Location of Coronation Island

Coronation Island, also known as Garlinju, is located off the Kimberley coast of Western Australia. It encompasses an area of 3,817 hectares (9,432 acres). It is located off Port Nelson in the Bonaparte Archipelago, as a part of the group of islands known as the Coronation Islands, which were named by Philip Parker King, the first European to visit the islands in 1820, after the anniversary of the coronation of George III, who had died in January of that year.

The traditional owners of the area are the Wunambal peoples, in whose language group of Wunambal the name for the island is Garlinju. The area holds preservation status.

During the Second World War, a military installation was established for Allied special forces under training purposes, later known as Station XIII; The station housed Allied commando force Z Special Unit for training prior towards the ill-fated Operation Rimau, executed by Lt. Col. Ivan Lyon of the British Army. Allied forces remained within the training station after the disastrous attack, where they experimented upon the grounds with underwater vehicles such as the Motorised Submersible Canoe, along with the Welman and Welfreighter submersibles utilised by special forces. Z Special Unit resumed participating within clandestine operations around the Southeast Asian theatre shortly afterwards. A pier provided to accommodate boatcraft was constructed by the Royal Australian Engineers, circa 1943, and was in use for the remainder of the war before it was dismantled.

Careening Bay (Wunbung-gu) is a bay on the island, where King careened his cutter, HMS Mermaid, to make repairs. While on the island, the ship's carpenter engraved the name of the ship on a Boab tree (known as the Bodgurri by the Wunambal) that is still visible today. Parker did not observe any of the local people, but made observations in his journal on the other signs of life that they observed. He described not only bark shelters on the beach, but more larger and more substantial buildings on top of the hill. He also observed the remnants of sago palm nuts, which were commonly eaten along the coast.

There is a Makassan Islamic mihrab (prayer alcove) behind the boab.

Careening Bay is within the Prince Regent National Park and a permit is required to visit the site.

Priority flora found on the island include solanum cataphractum.
