= Gannet Island (Western Australia) =

Island in Western Australia

Gannet Island in the Montebello Islands is located at 20°26′52″S 115°34′01″E off the Pilbara coast of Western Australia.
