= Booby Island (Western Australia) =

Island in Western Australia

Coordinates: 15°03′41″S 124°19′35″E

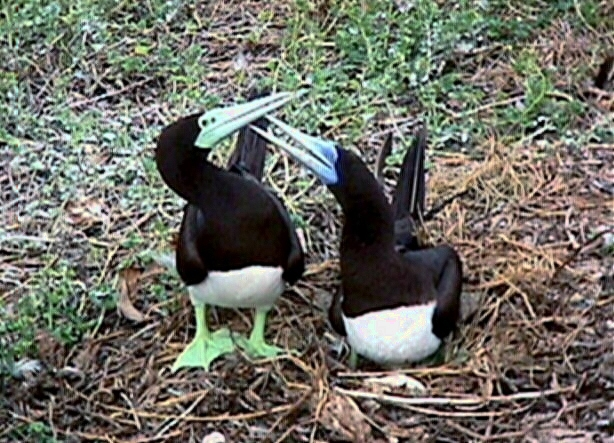
Nesting brown boobies

Booby Island, once known as White Island, is a 3-hectare (7.4-acre) uninhabited island in the Bonaparte Archipelago of the Kimberley region of Western Australia. It was renamed in 2004 to avoid confusion with another "White Island" in the Kimberley region. It is classified by BirdLife International as an Important Bird Area because it supports more than 1% of the world's population of brown boobies, with a breeding colony of up to 2,000 pairs.
