= Bonaparte Archipelago =

Island group in the Kimberley region of Western Australia

Coordinates: 14°17′S 125°18′E

Location of the Bonaparte Archipelago

The Bonaparte Archipelago is a group of islands off the coast of Western Australia in the Kimberley region, within the Shire of Wyndham-East Kimberley. The closest inhabited place is Kalumburu located about 100 kilometres (62 mi) to the east of the island group. The archipelago was named by the Baudin expedition on 16 August 1801 after Napoleon Bonaparte, First Consul of France.

== Geography ==
The archipelago is made up of the islands and islets lying off a stretch of 150 kilometres (93 mi) of coastline, roughly between Collier Bay to the south-west and Admiralty Gulf to the north-east, including islands in Admiralty Gulf itself. The islands are mostly small, and many are best described as islets or emergent rocks. They number several hundred in total. Several submerged banks and shoals are also found within the archipelago.

The largest island in the group is Augustus Island which has an area of 190 square kilometres (73 sq mi). Another significant island is the 3 ha (7.4 acres) Booby Island, which is classified as an Important Bird Area and Jungulu Island found just off-shore from Augustus Island.

Other islands in the group include Uwins Island, Coronation Island and Bigge Island.

== See also ==
- Browse Island
