= Augustus Island (Western Australia) =

Island of Kimberley region in Western Australia

Augustus Island (Wurroolgu)
- Location within Western Australia

Geography
- Coordinates: 15°21′41″S 124°33′06″E
- Total islands: 1
- Area: 18,992 ha (46,930 acres)
- Length: 22 km (13.7 mi) (Note: The maximum measurement in this dimension.)
- Width: 16 km (9.9 mi)

Administration
- Commonwealth of Australia
- State: Western Australia
- Region: Kimberley
- Shire: Wyndham-East Kimberley

Demographics
- Population: 0

Augustus Island (Worrorra: Wurroolgu), is an uninhabited island off the Kimberley coast of Western Australia, within the Shire of Wyndham-East Kimberley.

The island is 22 kilometres (14 mi) in length and has a maximum width of 16 kilometres (10 mi) with a total area of 190 square kilometres (73 sq mi) and has an irregular shape. It is at the Southern end of the Bonaparte Archipelago.

The island is found approximately 120 kilometres (75 mi) north-east of Bardi.

Although most of the islands in the Kimberley are unallocated DEC crown land, Jungulu is one of the islands near the former Kunmunya Mission which are included in Reserve 23079 for Use and Benefit of Aborigines.

The island is uninhabited and contains no known feral animals.

Many flora and fauna were isolated from the mainland when sea levels rose and many populations are found intact on the island. The island provides ideal habitat for the Nabarlek, also known as the Little Rock-Wallaby, with the weathered sandstone forming deep fissures.

The golden bandicoot is another vulnerable species that is resident on the island, the last recorded sighting being in 2003. This species favours the Warton sandstone and the heathland on dissected sandstone.
