= List of islands of Western Australia, D–G =

This list includes all coastal and inland islands, cays, isles and islets. It also includes named island groups, archipelagos and island clumps. It is complete with respect to the 1996 Gazetteer of Australia. Dubious names have been checked against the online 2004 data, and in all cases confirmed correct. However, if any islands have been gazetted or deleted since 1996, this list does not reflect these changes. Strictly speaking, Australian place names are gazetted in capital letters only; the names in this list have been converted to mixed case in accordance with normal capitalisation conventions. Locations are as gazetted; some islands may extend over large areas.

== D ==
Name	Coordinates	Remarks
D'Aguesseau Island	15°09′50″S 124°32′48″E	
D'Arcole Islands	14°54′46″S 124°40′56″E	
Dahlia Island	20°25′48″S 115°34′38″E	
Dailey Island	34°04′34″S 123°07′31″E	
Daisy Island	20°26′25″S 115°34′44″E	
Dakin Island	28°28′37″S 113°48′25″E	
Dalgety Island	25°07′32″S 115°45′17″E	
Dampier Archipelago	20°22′42″S 116°52′23″E	
Dampiers Monument	16°07′36″S 123°26′21″E	
Dandelion Island	20°25′59″S 115°34′41″E	
Darcy Island	15°20′33″S 124°23′32″E	
Davis Island (Western Australia)	24°54′41″S 115°16′18″E	A couple of hundred kilometres inland from Shark Bay ?????
Davis Island (Houtman Abrolhos)	28°54′53″S 113°52′33″E	
Davy Island	34°08′09″S 121°55′58″E	
Daw Island	33°50′55″S 124°08′04″E	
De Freycinet Islet	14°59′23″S 124°31′59″E	
Dean Island (Western Australia)	16°23′20″S 123°07′10″E	
Degerando Island	15°20′13″S 124°11′31″E	
Delambre Island	20°26′52″S 117°04′36″E	
Delta Island (Western Australia)	20°26′37″S 115°32′47″E	
Dempsey Island	16°30′25″S 123°25′06″E	
Depuch Island	20°37′54″S 117°43′27″E	Pilbara coast
Desaix Islands	14°53′41″S 124°53′02″E	
Descartes Island (Western Australia)	14°10′04″S 125°40′37″E	
Desfontaines Island	15°01′21″S 124°51′09″E	
Diamond Island (Western Australia)	31°21′04″S 115°31′44″E	
Dick Island	34°16′45″S 115°11′07″E	
Dicks Island	28°29′51″S 113°45′56″E	
Direction Island (Cocos (Keeling) Islands)	12°05′16″S 096°52′55″E	
Direction Island (Kimberley coast)	16°25′40″S 123°08′56″E	
Direction Island (Exmouth Gulf)	21°32′06″S 115°07′42″E	
Dirk Hartog Island	25°50′36″S 113°03′18″E	Shark Bay
Disappearing Island (Houtman Abrolhos)	28°47′03″S 113°44′23″E	
Diver Island	28°52′02″S 113°58′20″E	
Dixon Island (Western Australia)	20°37′35″S 117°03′45″E	
Djarumu Island	15°19′20″S 124°13′25″E	
Dolphin Island (Western Australia)	20°29′43″S 116°51′09″E	
Dome Island (Western Australia)	34°09′54″S 123°20′37″E	
Don Island	14°16′03″S 125°19′00″E	
Doole Island	22°28′23″S 114°09′43″E	
Doris Island	16°18′13″S 123°17′33″E	
Dorney Island	16°16′48″S 123°24′58″E	
Dorothy Island	16°09′11″S 123°31′51″E	
Dorre Island	25°03′26″S 113°06′04″E	
Dot Island (Western Australia)	20°26′13″S 115°34′43″E	
Double Island (Western Australia)	24°40′38″S 116°11′39″E	
Double Island (Western Australia)	26°24′57″S 113°36′59″E	
Double Island (Western Australia)	20°44′40″S 115°29′30″E	
Doubtful Islands	34°22′36″S 119°34′38″E	
Douglas Island (Western Australia)	34°09′53″S 123°08′22″E	
Dove Island (Western Australia)	16°29′46″S 123°22′21″E	
Downes Island	20°18′50″S 118°30′46″E	
Draper Island (Western Australia)	34°11′48″S 122°29′39″E	
Dry Island	28°44′22″S 113°46′43″E	
Duguesclin Island	15°06′48″S 124°31′53″E	
Dunvert Island	16°17′20″S 123°30′52″E	
Dyer Island (Western Australia)	32°01′11″S 115°32′56″E	

== E ==
Name	Coordinates	Remarks
Eagle Island (Western Australia)	26°5′40″S 113°34′30″E	
Eaglehawk Island	20°39′30″S 116°26′34″E	
East Governor Island	13°56′45″S 126°42′15″E	
East Intercourse Island	20°39′16″S 116°40′58″E	
East Island (Ashmore and Cartier Islands)	12°15′S 123°05′E	Part of the Ashmore and Cartier Islands territory; added to Gazetteer since 1996.
East Island (Lacepede Islands)	16°54′9″S 122°11′45″E	Located in the Lacepede Islands; site of the East Island Lighthouse.
East Island (Mary Anne Group)	21°16′30″S 115°35′44″E	Located in the Mary Anne Group.
East Lewis Island	20°36′33″S 116°39′32″E	
East Lyons Island	25°2′19″S 115°9′24″E	
East Mid Intercourse Island	20°40′5″S 116°39′59″E	
East Montalivet Island	14°16′49″S 125°17′54″E	
East Moore Island	20°38′20″S 117°41′23″E	
East Roe Island	16°22′8″S 123°13′28″E	
East Sunday Island	16°24′41″S 123°12′37″E	
East Wallabi Island	28°26′23″S 113°43′33″E	
Easter Group	28°44′12″S 113°46′9″E	
Eastern Group	33°43′59″S 124°5′58″E	
Eastern Island	28°27′55″S 113°48′42″E	
Eastern Islands (Western Australia)	28°40′17″S 113°52′11″E	
Eclipse Hill Island	13°56′30″S 126°17′3″E	
Eclipse Island (Western Australia)	35°11′0″S 117°52′54″E	
Eclipse Islands	13°54′53″S 126°18′24″E	
Edeline Islands	16°22′12″S 123°36′30″E	
Edwards Island (Western Australia)	31°1′48″S 115°19′23″E	
Egg Island (Western Australia)	25°54′34″S 113°9′20″E	
Egret Island	20°39′14″S 116°25′46″E	
Eight Island	28°53′56″S 113°51′36″E	
Elbow Island	34°55′11″S 117°58′33″E	
Elsie Island (Western Australia)	14°14′27″S 127°42′24″E	
Ena Island	14°58′10″S 125°1′9″E	
Encounter Islands	32°38′29″S 115°52′24″E	
Endeavour Island	32°35′50″S 115°38′14″E	
Enderby Island (Western Australia)	20°36′32″S 116°31′11″E	
Entrance Island (Western Australia)	15°16′51″S 124°37′19″E	
Epsilon Island	20°26′45″S 115°34′44″E	
Eric Island	14°15′39″S 127°43′47″E	
Escape Island	30°20′3″S 114°59′5″E	
Etisus Island	15°14′20″S 124°25′27″E	
Evelyn Island (Western Australia)	14°6′39″S 127°34′9″E	

== F ==
Name	Coordinates	Remarks
Fairfax Island	15°11′5″S 128°6′11″E	
Fairway Islands	16°34′33″S 123°18′56″E	
False Island	35°0′54″S 118°10′20″E	
False Island	21°21′27″S 115°26′24″E	
Far Island	28°27′40″S 113°48′19″E	
Farr Islands	16°27′6″S 123°23′59″E	
Faure Island	25°51′22″S 113°53′35″E	
Favorite Island	30°17′3″S 115°0′21″E	
Fenelon Island	14°7′53″S 125°41′58″E	
Figure Of Eight Island	34°1′41″S 121°36′18″E	
Finch Islands	16°8′17″S 123°27′38″E	
Finger Island	34°6′15″S 122°20′37″E	
Finucane Island	20°18′16″S 118°33′4″E	
First Sister	28°28′39″S 113°44′33″E	
Fisherman Islands	30°7′50″S 114°56′33″E	
Flag Island (Western Australia)	20°27′33″S 115°34′44″E	
Flat Island (Western Australia)	14°9′12″S 125°41′53″E	
Flat Island (Western Australia)	21°36′13″S 114°37′13″E	
Fletcher Islands (Western Australia)	16°21′10″S 124°20′52″E	
Flinders Island (Western Australia)	34°24′54″S 115°12′17″E	
Flora Island	16°3′38″S 123°30′50″E	
Fly Island (Western Australia)	21°48′24″S 114°32′58″E	
Foale Island	28°52′45″S 114°0′20″E	
Folly Island (Buccaneer Archipelago)	16°22′46″S 123°25′26″E	
Fontanes Island	14°53′37″S 124°55′19″E	
Forbin Island	15°4′35″S 124°43′6″E	
Ford Island (Western Australia)	25°14′3″S 116°37′20″E	
Ford Island (Western Australia)	33°46′2″S 124°2′22″E	
Forestier Islands	20°35′8″S 117°46′16″E	
Forrest Island	33°55′3″S 122°42′29″E	
Fortescue Island	20°54′31″S 116°2′6″E	
Fossil Island	15°19′48″S 128°16′23″E	
Foxglove Island	20°29′0″S 115°32′26″E	
Fraser Island (Western Australia)	16°3′28″S 123°21′51″E	
Fraser Island (Ningaloo Marine Park)	22°38′46″S 113°37′36″E	
Frederick Island	34°4′2″S 122°0′19″E	
Free Island	33°57′19″S 122°24′30″E	
Freycinet Island	26°24′26″S 113°37′0″E	
Friday Island (Western Australia)	26°6′9″S 113°24′9″E	
Froggart Island	14°5′36″S 125°43′27″E	

== G ==
Name	Coordinates	Remarks
Gabriel Island (Western Australia)	14°5′58″S 125°44′47″E	
Gadayim Pyramid	16°3′10″S 124°2′16″E	
Gagg Islands	16°10′27″S 123°25′34″E	
Gaimard Island	14°26′20″S 125°14′6″E	
Gale Island	14°56′3″S 124°55′10″E	
Gannet Island (Western Australia)	20°26′52″S 115°34′1″E	
Gap Island	15°19′51″S 124°52′9″E	
Garden Island (Western Australia)	32°12′18″S 115°40′24″E	
Gardenia Island	20°23′2″S 115°31′36″E	
Gaze Island	28°51′50″S 113°59′25″E	
George Island (Western Australia)	34°3′7″S 123°15′26″E	
Geranium Islands	13°54′31″S 126°35′17″E	
Gibbings Island	16°9′11″S 123°30′51″E	
Gibson Island (Western Australia)	16°18′42″S 123°18′0″E	
Gibson Island (Western Australia)	28°41′13″S 113°49′40″E	
Gidley Island	20°26′59″S 116°49′10″E	
Gilbert Island (Western Australia)	28°40′5″S 113°49′34″E	
Gill Island (Western Australia)	15°45′53″S 124°45′11″E	
Glasse Island	34°25′22″S 119°24′34″E	
Glauert Island	15°3′37″S 124°58′18″E	
Glennie Island	34°5′49″S 123°6′13″E	
Gnandaroo Island	21°57′25″S 114°31′13″E	
Goat Island (Western Australia)	16°10′21″S 123°19′11″E	
Godman Island	33°57′54″S 122°48′10″E	
Godsmark Island	16°7′13″S 123°17′36″E	
Goodwyn Island	20°32′12″S 116°32′14″E	
Goongoolup Island	32°35′27″S 115°45′53″E	
Goose Island	34°4′58″S 123°10′55″E	Just north of Middle Island, south-east of Esperance
Goose Island	35°4′7″S 116°43′39″E	Off Nornalup Inlet, just south of the Casuarina Isles
Gould Island (Western Australia)	33°57′56″S 122°51′25″E	
Governor Islands	13°56′36″S 126°41′58″E	
Granite Island (Western Australia)	15°29′17″S 124°35′59″E	
Great Sandy Island (Western Australia)	21°11′46″S 115°38′16″E	
Green Island (Rottnest Island)	32°01′03″S 115°29′50″E	South end of Nancy Cove, Rottnest Island
Green Island (Kimberley coast)	15°28′38″S 124°35′57″E	In the Kimberley Region, just South of Augustus Island
Green Island (Western Australia)	34°59′11″S 117°56′59″E	In Oyster Harbour, King George Sound - this page
Green Island (Ord River)	15°28′42″S 128°18′55″E	Located in the Ord River
Green Islands (Western Australia)	30°40′57″S 115°06′15″E	
Green Islands (Western Australia)	35°07′38″S 117°51′44″E	
Greenhalgh Island	16°28′11″S 123°26′24″E	
Gregory Island (Kimberley coast)	16°18′59″S 123°18′31″E	
Gregory Island (Houtman Abrolhos)	28°53′55″S 114°0′19″E	
Greville Island	15°18′19″S 124°51′17″E	
Grey Island	15°3′38″S 124°57′11″E	
Gulch Island (Western Australia)	34°1′31″S 123°14′50″E	
Gun Island	28°53′17″S 113°51′26″E	
Gunton Island	33°59′18″S 121°59′39″E	
Guy Reid Island	16°17′10″S 128°40′28″E	

== See also ==
- Coastal regions of Western Australia
- List of islands of Western Australia
- List of islands of Western Australia, 0–9, A–C
- List of islands of Western Australia, H–L
- List of islands of Western Australia, M–Q
- List of islands of Western Australia, R–T
- List of islands of Western Australia, U–Z
- Sortable list of islands of Western Australia
