= List of islands of Western Australia, 0–9, A–C =

This list includes all coastal and inland islands, cays, isles and islets. It also includes named island groups, archipelagos and island clumps. It is complete with respect to the 1996 Gazetteer of Australia. Dubious names have been checked against the online 2004 data, and in all cases confirmed correct. However, if any islands have been gazetted or deleted since 1996, this list does not reflect these changes. Strictly speaking, Australian place names are gazetted in capital letters only; the names in this list have been converted to mixed case in accordance with normal capitalisation conventions. Locations are as gazetted; some islands may extend over large areas.

== 0-9 ==
Name	Coordinates	Remarks
1 Island	28°54′34″S 113°52′55″E	
2 Island	28°54′34″S 113°52′42″E	
3 Island	28°54′24″S 113°52′16″E	
6 Mile Island	33°38′23″S 123°57′57″E	
7 Island	28°54′22″S 113°51′21″E	
8 Island	28°53′56″S 113°51′36″E	

== A ==
Name	Coordinates	Remarks
Abutilon Island	20°40′5″S 115°34′44″E	
Acasta Island	14°10′26″S 125°40′18″E	
Adele Island	15°31′25″S 123°9′16″E	
Admiral Island	16°4′0″S 123°24′6″E	
Adolphus Island	15°6′45″S 128°8′36″E	
Advance Island	16°9′19″S 123°55′46″E	
Ah Chong Island	20°31′30″S 115°32′30″E	
Airlie Island	21°19′26″S 115°9′55″E	
Akerstrom Island	28°28′30″S 113°41′51″E	
Albert Islands	14°31′7″S 124°55′30″E	
Alcatraz Island	28°27′43″S 113°43′18″E	
Alexander Island	28°40′26″S 113°49′44″E	
Alexander Island	18°23′56″S 125°21′57″E	
Alexander Island	33°18′44″S 115°42′3″E	
Allora Island	16°24′57″S 123°9′18″E	
Alma Islands	23°56′51″S 115°47′27″E	
Alpha Island	20°24′39″S 115°31′15″E	
Amethyst Island	16°18′34″S 128°38′48″E	
Anderdon Islands	14°55′55″S 125°10′23″E	
Angel Island	20°29′15″S 116°48′28″E	
Angle Island	21°4′48″S 115°49′30″E	
Anglesea Island	33°19′35″S 115°39′12″E	
Ant Island	26°9′47″S 113°26′32″E	
Anvil Island	33°44′17″S 124°5′39″E	
Apex Island	16°23′52″S 123°3′17″E	
Arbidej Island	16°12′4″S 123°32′32″E	
Archdeacon Island	34°7′16″S 123°3′57″E	
Arid Island	34°1′27″S 123°9′31″E	
Arthur Island	28°53′55″S 114°0′12″E	
Ashburton Island	21°35′33″S 114°56′2″E	
Asshlyn Islands	16°7′58″S 123°17′19″E	
Aster Island	20°25′52″S 115°34′38″E	
Atrina Island	15°13′54″S 124°29′35″E	
Attack Island	15°48′34″S 124°42′29″E	
Atys Island	15°14′15″S 124°31′2″E	
Augereau Island	14°45′22″S 125°7′43″E	
Augustus Island	15°20′38″S 124°32′12″E	
Augustus Springs Island	24°16′55″S 116°52′35″E	
Aunt Island	14°22′25″S 127°50′22″E	
Auriferous Island	29°7′5″S 119°38′8″E	
Aveling Island	16°20′34″S 123°36′46″E	
Avocet Island	32°36′27″S 115°38′46″E	

== B ==
Name	Coordinates	Remarks
Babbage Island	24°52′39″S 113°37′57″E	Named after Charles Babbage
Bailey Island (Western Australia)	26°54′29″S 118°19′44″E	
Bald Island (Broke Inlet)	34°56′36″S 116°29′0″E	
Bald Island	34°55′5″S 118°27′44″E	
Ballee Island	32°34′59″S 115°46′8″E	
Bar Island (Western Australia)	33°18′7″S 115°41′17″E	
Barbecue Island	16°8′53″S 128°42′1″E	
Barely Island	33°57′7″S 122°30′6″E	
Barnes Island (Australia)	15°11′38″S 128°10′16″E	
Barnicoat Island	16°27′39″S 123°25′50″E	
Barrier Island (Western Australia)	33°58′48″S 123°8′13″E	
Barrow Island (Western Australia)	20°47′56″S 115°24′17″E	
Basile Island	28°52′33″S 113°57′38″E	
Bat Island	15°6′22″S 124°54′25″E	
Bathurst Island (Western Australia)	16°2′41″S 123°31′57″E	
Baudin Island (Kimberly region)	14°7′44″S 125°36′12″E	
Baudin Island (Shark Bay)	26°30′54″S 113°38′55″E	
Bayliss Islands	16°12′59″S 123°29′29″E	
Beacon Island (Houtman Abrolhos)	28°28′35″S 113°47′2″E	
Beagle Islands (Western Australia)	29°48′30″S 114°52′31″E	
Beaumont Island (Western Australia)	34°5′27″S 122°32′20″E	
Bedford Islands	16°9′29″S 123°20′11″E	
Bedout Island	19°35′20″S 119°5′49″E	
Bedwell Island	17°18′59″S 119°20′29″E	
Beelu Island	24°56′40″S 115°53′39″E	
Bellinger Island	33°53′16″S 123°38′15″E	
Ben Island	33°54′0″S 122°45′13″E	
Bend Island	25°3′47″S 115°26′29″E	
Bernier Island	24°50′57″S 113°8′14″E	
Bernouilli Island	15°1′33″S 124°46′38″E	
Berthier Island	14°30′32″S 124°59′24″E	
Berthoud Island	14°16′51″S 125°50′17″E	
Bessieres Island	21°31′33″S 114°45′40″E	
Bezout Island	20°33′13″S 117°10′29″E	
Big Island (Western Australia)	24°7′39″S 115°31′14″E	
Bigge Island (Western Australia)	14°35′20″S 125°9′11″E	
Bignell Island	14°29′41″S 125°55′35″E	
Bird Island (Western Australia)	14°5′7″S 125°42′41″E	
Bird Island (Western Australia)	14°0′54″S 126°34′1″E	
Bird Island (Western Australia)	32°16′42″S 115°41′17″E	
Bishop Island (Western Australia)	14°24′26″S 125°20′19″E	
Black Island (Western Australia)	33°55′12″S 121°59′31″E	
Bluebell Island	20°23′54″S 115°31′8″E	
Bonaparte Archipelago	14°31′7″S 124°55′30″E	
Bonaparte Island	14°51′21″S 124°46′2″E	
Boodalan Island	32°35′37″S 115°44′53″E	
Boodie Island	20°57′46″S 115°19′33″E	
Boomerang Island	20°44′10″S 115°28′45″E	
Boongaree Island	15°5′14″S 125°11′56″E	
Boora Island	24°45′25″S 114°11′45″E	
Borda Island	14°14′12″S 126°1′14″E	
Boullanger Island	30°19′9″S 114°59′55″E	Named after Charles-Pierre Boullanger
Boundary Islet	32°34′15″S 115°42′38″E	
Boxer Island	34°0′3″S 121°40′35″E	
Branch Island	14°25′59″S 125°17′6″E	
Breaksea Island (Western Australia)	35°3′50″S 118°3′9″E	
Brewis Island (Western Australia)	34°4′22″S 123°4′8″E	
Bridled Island	20°38′23″S 115°33′22″E	
Brigadier Island	20°26′41″S 116°36′55″E	
Brooke Island	20°26′6″S 115°30′5″E	
Broughton Island (Western Australia)	33°58′53″S 122°25′58″E	
Brown Island (Western Australia)	21°53′11″S 114°33′32″E	
Browne Island (Western Australia)	15°8′4″S 124°30′9″E	
Browse Island	14°6′35″S 123°32′53″E	
Bruen Island	16°4′0″S 123°22′45″E	
Brunswick Island	32°45′1″S 115°42′13″E	
Buccaneer Archipelago	16°5′57″S 123°25′47″E	
Buffon Island	14°55′4″S 124°44′17″E	
Bullanyin Island	16°13′33″S 128°43′21″E	
Buller Island	30°39′26″S 115°6′47″E	
Bumpus Island	15°30′27″S 124°24′8″E	
Burnett Island (Western Australia)	28°52′22″S 113°57′47″E	
Burnside Island	22°6′21″S 114°30′31″E	
Burton Island (Western Australia)	28°51′59″S 113°59′6″E	
Bushby Island	28°43′25″S 113°47′7″E	
Buttercup Island	20°29′10″S 115°32′2″E	
Button Island (Western Australia)	33°54′13″S 121°53′20″E	
Byam Martin Island (Western Australia)	15°22′52″S 124°21′19″E	
Bynoe Island	28°39′54″S 113°52′31″E	
Byron Island (Buccaneer Archipelago)	16°9′45″S 123°26′55″E	

== C ==
Name	Coordinates	Remarks
Caesar Island	16°3′54″S 123°55′54″E	
Caffarelli Island	16°2′26″S 123°17′22″E	
Camp Island	24°41′46″S 115°19′5″E	
Campbell Island	20°25′45″S 115°32′35″E	
Campbell Island	28°41′44″S 113°50′5″E	
Campbell-Taylor Group	33°58′14″S 122°53′58″E	
Canard Island	33°59′36″S 122°1′15″E	
Canning Island	33°55′5″S 121°46′20″E	
Cap Island	33°58′39″S 122°56′11″E	
Capps Island	33°59′19″S 121°40′50″E	
Capstan Island	14°35′0″S 125°16′8″E	
Careening Island	15°30′3″S 124°35′46″E	
Carey Island	20°57′4″S 116°10′28″E	
Carlia Island	14°22′19″S 125°59′6″E	
Carnac Island	32°7′30″S 115°39′46″E	
Carnation Island	20°22′45″S 115°31′19″E	
Carronade Island	13°56′42″S 126°36′9″E	
Cassini Island	13°56′50″S 125°37′41″E	
Casuarina Isles	35°3′24″S 116°41′43″E	South of Nornalup Inlet
Caswell Island	14°28′12″S 125°11′54″E	
Cave Island	33°58′44″S 122°49′6″E	
Cecelia Islands	5°3′55″S 123°58′26″E	
Cecilia Islands	16°19′59″S 123°33′47″E	
Cervantes Islands	30°31′25″S 115°2′40″E	
Chambers Island	16°16′14″S 123°31′59″E	
Champagny Island	15°18′1″S 124°15′59″E	
Champagny Islands	15°19′20″S 124°13′12″E	
Championet Island	14°30′9″S 125°6′13″E	
Channel Island	32°33′52″S 115°43′5″E	
Channel Islands	20°39′28″S 116°41′39″E	
Charley Island	33°55′23″S 121°52′31″E	
Charlie Island	26°22′3″S 113°34′7″E	
Chatham Island	35°1′47″S 116°29′43″E	
Cheriton Island	16°30′21″S 123°24′43″E	
Cherry Island	32°11′32″S 121°44′6″E	
Cheyne Island	34°36′18″S 118°45′0″E	
Chinyin Island	16°7′26″S 128°45′3″E	
Christmas Island	10°29′1″S 105°37′16″E	
Claret Islands	15°41′39″S 124°22′50″E	
Clark Island	34°56′38″S 116°29′37″E	
Clarke Islands	16°23′39″S 123°18′46″E	
Cleft Island	16°2′16″S 123°21′1″E	
Cleghorn Island	14°22′1″S 125°24′11″E	
Clerk Island	14°23′46″S 125°19′5″E	
Cliff Island	34°1′6″S 122°5′10″E	
Cloud Island	34°2′42″S 122°5′15″E	
Cockatoo Island	16°5′55″S 123°37′0″E	
Cocos (Keeling) Islands	12°10′1″S 96°49′18″E	
Coffin Island	35°0′7″S 118°12′46″E	
Cohen Island	20°23′14″S 116°48′15″E	
Colbert Island	14°52′5″S 124°43′2″E	
Combe Hill Island	14°30′11″S 125°20′19″E	
Combe Island	14°26′20″S 125°1′49″E	
Commerson Island	15°9′12″S 124°39′31″E	
Condillac Island	14°6′22″S 125°33′21″E	
Conilurus Island	16°9′21″S 123°35′3″E	
Conway Island	15°52′5″S 123°40′16″E	
Conzinc Island	20°32′27″S 116°46′32″E	
Cooleenup Island	32°34′37″S 115°46′16″E	
Cooper Island	34°13′57″S 123°36′18″E	
Coorothoo Island	24°17′54″S 115°32′28″E	
Corbett Island	34°7′7″S 121°58′33″E	
Cormorant Island	20°45′14″S 115°29′21″E	
Corneille Island	14°11′7″S 125°43′57″E	
Cornwall Island	34°0′17″S 122°32′18″E	
Coronation Island	28°52′14″S 113°59′7″E	
Coronation Island	14°58′46″S 124°55′28″E	
Coronation Islands	14°58′13″S 124°55′28″E	
Corvisart Island	14°31′59″S 125°0′38″E	
Cotton Island	14°54′25″S 124°43′25″E	
Cowle Island	21°13′50″S 115°46′38″E	
Crabbe Island	15°58′32″S 123°41′25″E	
Crake Island	28°44′31″S 113°48′57″E	
Cranny Island	33°43′50″S 124°4′39″E	
Creak Island	33°56′52″S 122°42′53″E	
Creery Island	32°33′53″S 115°43′24″E	
Crocus Island	20°25′22″S 115°31′25″E	
Crusoe Island	34°59′13″S 117°25′37″E	
Cull Island	33°55′22″S 121°54′7″E	
Cunningham Island	17°34′59″S 118°55′59″E	
Cuppup Island	35°0′1″S 117°28′23″E	
Cussen Island	16°23′44″S 123°28′1″E	
Cymo Island	15°15′10″S 124°25′24″E	

== See also ==
- Coastal regions of Western Australia
- List of islands of Western Australia
- List of islands of Western Australia, D–G
- List of islands of Western Australia, H–L
- List of islands of Western Australia, M–Q
- List of islands of Western Australia, R–T
- List of islands of Western Australia, U–Z
- Sortable list of islands of Western Australia
