= List of islands of Western Australia, M–Q =

This list includes all coastal and inland islands, cays, isles and islets. It also includes named island groups, archipelagos and island clumps. It is complete with respect to the 1996 Gazetteer of Australia. Dubious names have been checked against the online 2004 data, and in all cases confirmed correct. However, if any islands have been gazetted or deleted since 1996, this list does not reflect these changes. Strictly speaking, Australian place names are gazetted in capital letters only; the names in this list have been converted to mixed case in accordance with normal capitalisation conventions. Locations are as gazetted; some islands may extend over large areas.

== M ==
Name	Coordinates	Remarks
Mably Island	14°57′3″S 124°52′57″E	
Mac Mahon Island	16°30′2″S 123°21′42″E	
Mackenzie Island	34°11′53″S 122°6′13″E	
Macleay Island	15°56′41″S 123°41′28″E	
Macleay Islands	15°53′17″S 123°39′19″E	
Malcolm Island	14°31′19″S 125°54′13″E	
Malup Island	31°44′12″S 115°46′55″E	
Malus Islands	20°31′8″S 116°40′24″E	
Man On Rock Islet	20°23′59″S 115°31′51″E	
Mangrove Group	28°52′16″S 113°58′21″E	
Mangrove Islands	21°30′5″S 115°21′15″E	
Mangrove Point	15°47′58″S 124°38′51″E	
Manicom Island	34°6′49″S 123°1′45″E	
Mardie Island	20°57′52″S 115°58′55″E	
Maret Island	14°24′35″S 124°58′31″E	
Maret Islands	14°24′35″S 124°58′31″E	
Margaret Island	16°22′30″S 123°23′34″E	
Marigold Island	20°27′33″S 115°33′14″E	
Marinula Island	28°28′31″S 113°41′57″E	
Marndungum Island	15°55′42″S 124°19′26″E	
Mart Islands	34°0′11″S 122°37′53″E	
Mary Anne Group	21°17′47″S 115°29′56″E	
Mary Anne Island	21°15′48″S 115°27′41″E	
Mary Anne Island	26°29′6″S 113°40′59″E	
Mary Durack Island	16°19′41″S 128°41′9″E	
Mary Island	13°59′49″S 126°22′47″E	
Mary Island North	17°15′54″S 123°32′43″E	
Mary Island South	17°18′37″S 123°32′43″E	
Mary Islands	16°22′3″S 123°29′45″E	
Mawby Island	20°31′15″S 116°41′34″E	
Mcculloch Island	14°56′10″S 124°40′23″E	
Mcintyre Island	15°59′16″S 123°32′13″E	
Meade Island	26°0′5″S 113°11′57″E	
Meeyip Island	32°34′48″S 115°45′49″E	
Melomys Island	16°9′4″S 124°4′48″E	
Mermaid Island	16°26′1″S 123°21′3″E	
Miawaja Island	15°12′52″S 124°24′38″E	
Michaelmas Island	35°2′39″S 118°2′9″E	
Mictyis Island	15°12′39″S 124°47′53″E	
Mid Lyons Island	25°2′8″S 115°8′23″E	
Middle Island	16°26′55″S 123°5′2″E	
Middle Island	16°51′29″S 122°8′13″E	
Middle Island	20°54′31″S 115°19′36″E	
Middle Island	34°6′4″S 123°11′20″E	
Middle Island	28°54′31″S 113°54′36″E	
Middle Mangrove Island	21°28′47″S 115°21′11″E	
Middle Mary Anne Island	21°17′36″S 115°34′14″E	
Middle Osborn Island	14°19′36″S 126°0′20″E	
Middle Passage Island	21°2′58″S 115°50′16″E	
Midway Island	15°16′57″S 124°52′0″E	
Migo Island	35°4′20″S 117°38′48″E	
Miles Island (Western Australia)	34°4′4″S 123°13′53″E	
Milligan Island	30°2′16″S 114°57′18″E	
Mistaken Island	20°39′19″S 116°39′42″E	
Mistaken Island	35°3′49″S 117°56′34″E	
Molema Island	16°15′37″S 123°54′10″E	
Moliere Island	14°13′46″S 125°49′33″E	
Molloy Island	34°16′9″S 115°12′26″E	
Mondrain Island	34°8′14″S 122°14′43″E	
Monge Island (Western Australia)	14°12′30″S 125°36′30″E	
Monsmont Island	16°17′50″S 128°42′0″E	
Montebello Islands	20°26′10″S 115°31′41″E	An archipelago of around 174 small islands
Montesquieu Islands	14°6′15″S 125°43′54″E	
Montgomery Islands	15°57′38″S 124°12′18″E	
Morley Island	28°44′47″S 113°48′45″E	
Morrisey Island	16°31′46″S 123°24′33″E	
Muddle Islands	16°23′12″S 123°26′29″E	
Muir Island	16°3′39″S 124°2′8″E	
Muiron Islands	21°40′8″S 114°20′32″E	
Mulgudna Island	16°3′14″S 124°18′20″E	
Murrangingi Island	14°21′31″S 125°34′38″E	
Murrara Island	14°59′41″S 125°14′27″E	
Murray Island	28°53′53″S 113°53′47″E	
Museums Island (Western Australia)	14°56′57″S 124°45′8″E	
Mushroom Island (Western Australia)	20°43′26″S 115°28′56″E	
Myres Island	14°34′28″S 125°53′12″E	

== N ==
Name	Coordinates	Remarks
Nalamdarim Island	16°14′56″S 128°42′44″E	
Nares Island	33°56′1″S 122°35′35″E	
New Island	34°1′9″S 122°8′28″E	
New Year Island	33°51′26″S 124°7′32″E	
Newbold Island	28°52′54″S 114°0′19″E	
Newdegate Island	35°0′34″S 116°42′31″E	
Newman Island	28°51′48″S 113°59′42″E	
Ngalanguru Island	15°54′36″S 124°20′31″E	
Nglayu Island	14°21′13″S 125°42′38″E	
Nook Island	28°51′58″S 113°59′57″E	
North East Regnard Island	20°46′31″S 116°18′28″E	
North East Twin Island	21°30′38″S 115°12′55″E	
North Eclipse Island	13°52′43″S 126°18′26″E	
North Guano Island	26°31′59″S 113°41′25″E	
North Hummocks	16°13′34″S 128°45′13″E	
North Island	28°18′9″S 113°35′41″E	
North Island	21°27′22″S 115°22′7″E	
North Kangaroo Island	26°17′57″S 113°30′11″E	
North Keeling Island	11°48′52″S 96°49′28″E	
North Muiron Island	21°38′18″S 114°22′25″E	
North Sandy Island	21°6′17″S 115°39′3″E	
North Tail	30°16′20″S 114°58′8″E	
North Turtle Island	19°53′25″S 118°53′44″E	
North Twin Peak Island	33°59′27″S 122°50′18″E	
North West Island	20°21′50″S 115°31′27″E	
North West Twin Island	16°16′41″S 123°3′34″E	
Numanbu Island	15°19′53″S 124°12′38″E	
Numbered Islands	28°54′24″S 113°52′16″E	
Nuyts Archipelago	32°23′0″S 113°37′0″E	

== O ==
Name	Coordinates	Remarks
Observation Island	21°44′26″S 114°32′26″E	
Observatory Island	33°55′27″S 121°47′31″E	
Okenia Island	15°13′54″S 124°29′1″E	
Oliver Island	14°5′38″S 125°44′23″E	
Onad Island	16°22′13″S 124°27′3″E	
One Tree Island	15°20′31″S 124°44′48″E	
Osborn Islands	14°16′22″S 126°2′2″E	
Osprey Island	30°18′39″S 114°59′40″E	
Otway Island	15°16′7″S 128°6′20″E	
Owen Island (Western Australia)	34°2′30″S 123°14′8″E	
Oystercatcher Island	28°27′48″S 113°42′47″E	

== P ==
Name	Coordinates	Remarks
Pack Island	16°30′50″S 123°24′31″E	
Packer Island	16°34′10″S 122°47′19″E	
Packer Islands	16°17′33″S 123°28′40″E	
Pansy Island	20°22′30″S 115°32′35″E	
Panton Island	15°15′50″S 128°14′26″E	
Parakeelya Island	20°37′56″S 115°31′11″E	
Parakeet Island	31°59′18″S 115°30′45″E	
Parrot Island	26°24′45″S 113°30′9″E	
Parry Island	14°19′20″S 125°45′53″E	
Pascal Island	14°4′8″S 125°38′59″E	
Pasco Island	16°31′10″S 123°23′19″E	
Pasco Island	34°3′54″S 122°6′10″E	
Pasco Island	20°57′40″S 115°20′17″E	
Pasley Island	34°0′44″S 123°31′49″E	
Passage Island	21°6′23″S 115°47′4″E	
Passage Islands (Western Australia)	21°0′44″S 115°50′52″E	
Patricia Island	14°15′34″S 125°18′27″E	
Peak Island	21°36′7″S 114°30′27″E	
Peak Island	34°13′0″S 115°1′6″E	
Pearson Islands	34°12′18″S 122°20′48″E	
Pecked Island	16°31′30″S 123°26′24″E	
Pelican Island (Kimberley coast)	14°46′10″S 128°46′26″E	
Pelican Island (Shark Bay)	25°51′12″S 114°0′48″E	
Pelican Island (Houtman Abrolhos)	28°27′36″S 113°40′34″E	
Pelican Island (Albany coast)	34°59′38″S 117°23′41″E	
The Pelicans	16°10′5″S 128°42′56″E	
Pell Creek Island	25°13′55″S 115°32′25″E	
Pelsaert Group	28°54′18″S 113°54′43″E	
Pelsaert Island	28°55′45″S 113°58′27″E	
Pemberton Island	20°39′48″S 116°57′2″E	
Penguin Island	32°18′23″S 115°41′20″E	
Picard Island	20°40′56″S 117°15′47″E	
The Piccaninnies	16°7′26″S 123°37′4″E	
Pigeon Island	28°27′18″S 113°43′34″E	
Plover Island	28°28′5″S 113°42′43″E	
Pointer Island	33°43′21″S 124°5′46″E	
Poolngin Island	16°23′36″S 123°8′58″E	
Pope Island (Western Australia)	16°29′35″S 123°21′51″E	
Pope Island (Western Australia)	16°10′44″S 123°20′21″E	
Post Office Island	28°51′53″S 113°58′28″E	
Potter Island (Western Australia)	20°56′21″S 116°9′1″E	
Powerful Island	16°5′57″S 123°25′50″E	
Preston Island	20°49′38″S 116°11′32″E	
Primrose Island	20°22′19″S 115°30′52″E	
Prince Island	15°13′18″S 128°12′16″E	
Prince Island	20°43′41″S 115°28′30″E	
Prison Island	12°6′12″S 96°53′11″E	
Prudhoe Island	14°25′18″S 125°15′46″E	
Prudhoe Islands	14°25′14″S 125°15′29″E	
Pulu Ampang	12°7′38″S 96°54′30″E	
Pulu Ampang Kechil	12°7′28″S 96°54′24″E	
Pulu Belan	12°11′50″S 96°52′42″E	
Pulu Belan Madar	12°12′3″S 96°52′56″E	
Pulu Belekok	12°7′53″S 96°54′32″E	
Pulu Cheplok	12°8′12″S 96°54′49″E	
Pulu Gangsa	12°6′20″S 96°53′15″E	
Pulu Jembatan	12°8′45″S 96°54′59″E	
Pulu Kambing	12°11′40″S 96°50′56″E	
Pulu Kembang	12°8′0″S 96°54′37″E	
Pulu Labu	12°9′27″S 96°55′5″E	
Pulu Maria	12°11′57″S 96°51′56″E	
Pulu Pandan	12°8′50″S 96°55′10″E	
Pulu Pasir	12°5′42″S 96°53′11″E	
Pulu Siput	12°9′13″S 96°55′4″E	
Pulu Wak Banka	12°8′35″S 96°55′2″E	
Pulu Wak Idas	12°7′45″S 96°54′31″E	
Pumpkin Islands	16°16′45″S 128°43′41″E	
Pup Island	21°9′41″S 115°39′15″E	
Purrungku Island	14°38′32″S 125°13′40″E	
Pyrene Island	15°15′26″S 124°24′9″E	

== Q ==
Name	Coordinates	Remarks
Quagering Island	34°51′1″S 115°59′38″E	
Quartermaine Island	20°28′17″S 116°37′22″E	
Queen Island (Western Australia)	14°35′39″S 125°4′17″E	
Quoy Island	14°25′35″S 125°14′24″E	

== See also ==
- Coastal regions of Western Australia
- List of islands of Western Australia
- List of islands of Western Australia, 0–9, A–C
- List of islands of Western Australia, D–G
- List of islands of Western Australia, H–L
- List of islands of Western Australia, R–T
- List of islands of Western Australia, U–Z
- Sortable list of islands of Western Australia
