= List of islands in Shark Bay =

This is a list of the islands in the Shark Bay area of the Gascoyne Region of Western Australia, (between 24°30′0″ and 26°30′0″ S, and 112°0′0″ and 114°30′0″ E).

There are approximately 30 small islands in Shark Bay; all are within the World Heritage Reserve.

The largest is Dirk Hartog Island.

Island	Area (ha)	Location	Vicinity
Baudin Island	20	26°30′54″S 113°38′55″E	Henri Freycinet Harbour
Bernier Island	4,000	24°50′57″S 113°08′14″E	Bernier Island
Charles Island / Charlie Island	1	26°22′03″S 113°34′07″E	Henri Freycinet Harbour
Dirk Hartog Island	63,000	25°50′36″S 113°03′18″E	Dirk Hartog Island
Dorre Island	4,900	25°03′26″S 113°06′04″E	Bernier Island
Double Island	1	26°24′57″S 113°36′59″E	Henri Freycinet Harbour
Egg Island	1	25°54′34″S 113°09′20″E	Dirk Hartog Island
Faure Island	5,200	25°51′22″S 113°53′35″E	Faure Island
Freycinet Island	3	26°24′26″S 113°37′00″E	Henri Freycinet Harbour
Friday Island	1	26°06′09″S 113°24′09″E	Freycinet Reach
Koks Island	4	24°45′02″S 113°09′33″E	Bernier Island
Mary Anne Island	1	26°29′06″S 113°40′59″E	Henri Freycinet Harbour
North Guano Island	6	26°31′59″S 113°41′25″E	Henri Freycinet Harbour
Pelican Island	8	25°51′12″S 114°00′48″E	Faure Is
Salutation Island	170	26°32′22″S 113°45′56″E	Henri Freycinet Harbour
South Guano Island	2	26°32′45″S 113°41′26″E	Henri Freycinet Harbour
Three Bays Island	5	26°33′15″S 113°38′46″E	Henri Freycinet Harbour
White Island	1	26°26′38″S 113°45′41″E	Henri Freycinet Harbour
Wilds Island	1	26°27′06″S 113°36′54″E	Henri Freycinet Harbour
Ant Island		26°09′47″S 113°26′32″E	
Babbage Island	84	24°52′39″S 113°37′57″E	Carnarvon
Boora Island		24°45′25″S 114°11′45″E	
Eagle Island	1	26°05′40″S 113°34′30″E	Freycinet Reach
Hutchison Islands	1	26°06′47″S 114°14′05″E	Faure Island
Kangaroo Island	1	26°19′09″S 113°29′58″E	Henri Freycinet Harbour
Lefebre Island	6	26°13′50″S 113°30′25″E	Henri Freycinet Harbour
Meade Island	1	26°00′05″S 113°11′57″E	Dirk Hartog Island
North Kangaroo Island	1	26°17′57″S 113°30′11″E	Henri Freycinet Harbour
Parrot Island		26°24′45″S 113°30′09″E	
Slope Island	5	26°05′27″S 113°24′45″E	Freycinet Reach
Smith Islands	1	26°35′20″S 113°43′35″E	Henri Freycinet Harbour
Sunday Island		26°07′32″S 113°14′06″E	
Unknown Island		26°23′16″S 113°22′16″E	
Whitlock Island		24°53′14″S 113°38′44″E	
Whitmore Island		24°52′00″S 113°37′20″E	
Wilson Island		26°09′55″S 113°39′33″E	

== See also ==
- List of islands of Western Australia
