= List of islands of Western Australia, R–T =

This list includes all coastal and inland islands, cays, isles and islets. It also includes named island groups, archipelagos and island clumps.

This list is complete with respect to the 1996 Gazetteer of Australia. Dubious names have been checked against the online 2004 data, and in all cases confirmed correct. However, if any islands have been gazetted or deleted since 1996, this list does not reflect these changes. Strictly speaking, Australian place names are gazetted in capital letters only; the names in this list have been converted to mixed case in accordance with normal capitalisation conventions. Locations are as gazetted; some islands may extend over large areas.

== R ==
Name	Coordinates	Remarks
Rabbit Island	34°59′0″S 117°24′23″E	near Denmark
Rabbit Island	33°54′54″S 121°53′31″E	near Esperance
Racine Island	14°15′56″S 125°49′34″E	
Ram Island	34°1′55″S 122°8′29″E	
Randall Island	14°8′37″S 125°34′39″E	
Rankin Island	16°19′19″S 124°23′23″E	
Rat Island	16°24′5″S 123°7′7″E	
Rat Island	28°42′56″S 113°47′2″E	
Rathbun Island	14°55′54″S 124°40′40″E	
Razor Islands	16°27′5″S 123°33′8″E	
Archipelago of the Recherche	34°12′14″S 122°20′54″E	
Red Island	13°54′6″S 126°6′13″E	
Red Island	33°52′21″S 121°20′55″E	
Red Island	15°12′49″S 124°15′30″E	
Red Island	34°2′13″S 119°46′58″E	
Red Islet	18°42′4″S 121°41′37″E	
Reef Island	20°28′18″S 117°55′24″E	
Rees Island	16°23′13″S 123°6′16″E	
Remark Island	34°3′52″S 121°59′3″E	
Remote Island	16°17′47″S 128°45′9″E	
Reveley Island	14°22′11″S 127°48′45″E	
Richards Island	35°4′33″S 117°38′52″E	
Ridley Island (Western Australia)	31°56′26″S 116°24′52″E	
Ripon Island	20°6′29″S 119°11′58″E	
Rivoli Islands	21°56′26″S 114°27′12″E	
Rob Island	34°2′2″S 122°13′55″E	
Roberts Island	22°25′9″S 114°11′1″E	
Roberts Island	16°6′41″S 123°45′59″E	
Robertson Island	28°52′58″S 114°0′20″E	
Rocky Island	34°4′54″S 115°21′4″E	
Rocky Island	14°5′46″S 127°32′50″E	
Rocky Island	21°32′31″S 119°20′10″E	
Rocky Islands	21°52′21″S 114°35′59″E	
Rocky Islands	15°7′25″S 124°30′44″E	
Rodondo Island	33°49′38″S 123°58′53″E	
Roe Island	20°46′56″S 117°8′48″E	
Roma Island	28°43′57″S 113°47′6″E	
Ron Courtney Island	31°55′18″S 115°56′23″E	
Ronsard Island	20°31′42″S 117°51′32″E	
Rose Island	20°25′22″S 115°32′58″E	
Rosemary Island	20°28′58″S 116°35′31″E	
Rosily Islands	21°15′54″S 115°1′29″E	
Rotondella Island	28°52′21″S 113°59′45″E	
Rottnest Island	32°0′22″S 115°36′46″E	
Round Island	21°38′48″S 114°39′9″E	
Round Island	16°9′49″S 123°46′0″E	
Round Island	20°58′38″S 115°51′38″E	
Round Island	34°6′21″S 123°53′11″E	
Roy Island	34°1′45″S 122°14′26″E	
Ruby Island	33°57′11″S 123°7′9″E	
Russell Island	15°13′56″S 128°5′47″E	

== S ==
Name	Coordinates	Remarks
Sable Island	20°35′8″S 117°46′16″E	
Saddle Island	35°3′2″S 116°43′50″E	
Saint Alouarn Island	34°24′20″S 115°11′41″E	
Saint Alouarn Islands	34°24′20″S 115°11′41″E	
Saint Andrew Island	15°21′29″S 125°0′42″E	
Saint Patrick Island	15°21′15″S 124°57′38″E	
Salier Islands	16°18′56″S 123°16′33″E	
Salisbury Island	34°21′39″S 123°33′1″E	
Salural Island	16°23′13″S 123°7′50″E	
Salutation Island	26°32′22″S 113°45′56″E	
Sand Cay (Western Australia)	14°14′32″S 125°19′9″E	
Sand Island	13°51′6″S 125°48′23″E	
Sandland Island	30°12′40″S 114°59′16″E	
Sandpiper Island	32°36′19″S 115°38′50″E	
Sandy Hook Island	34°2′4″S 121°59′32″E	
Sandy Island	28°46′31″S 113°47′8″E	
Sandy Island	28°52′22″S 113°52′35″E	
Sandy Island	20°42′47″S 116°33′59″E	
Sandy Island	20°38′4″S 117°40′59″E	
Sandy Island	34°52′2″S 116°2′12″E	
Sandy Island	13°45′58″S 126°47′24″E	
Sandy Island	16°52′57″S 122°10′4″E	
Saville Island	15°8′58″S 128°6′3″E	
Saville-Kent Island	28°27′56″S 113°48′27″E	
Scaddan Island	16°8′2″S 123°51′16″E	
Scorpion Island	13°51′50″S 126°37′18″E	
Scott Island	16°29′10″S 123°21′20″E	
Seagull Island	28°27′29″S 113°42′52″E	
Seagull Island	35°4′24″S 117°40′33″E	
Seal Island	33°57′46″S 120°7′40″E	
Seal Island	35°4′35″S 117°58′21″E	
Seal Island	32°17′36″S 115°41′19″E	
Seal Island	28°29′1″S 113°48′7″E	
Seal Island	34°22′51″S 115°9′18″E	
Seaward Ledge	30°17′30″S 114°58′9″E	
Serene Island	14°54′28″S 124°43′7″E	
Serrurier Island	21°36′26″S 114°40′45″E	
Serventy Island	28°40′59″S 113°49′52″E	
Shag Islands	32°17′47″S 115°41′24″E	
Shale Island	16°22′48″S 124°20′19″E	
Shannon Island	34°53′46″S 116°25′2″E	
Shearwater Island	28°43′56″S 113°49′29″E	
Sheep Island	15°29′22″S 124°36′44″E	
Shelter Island	35°3′4″S 117°41′25″E	
Shirley Island	16°15′59″S 123°26′39″E	
Sholl Island	20°56′45″S 115°53′19″E	
Sid Liddon Island	28°54′40″S 113°51′49″E	
Simpson Island	22°7′44″S 114°29′4″E	
Sir Frederick Island	16°7′35″S 123°24′6″E	
Sir Graham Moore Island	13°53′24″S 126°31′44″E	
Sir Graham Moore Islands (Western Australia)	13°52′54″S 126°36′11″E	
Sir Richard Island	16°24′51″S 123°29′12″E	
The Sisters	16°9′8″S 123°49′44″E	
Six Mile Island	33°38′29″S 123°57′44″E	
Skink Island	33°59′14″S 123°8′49″E	
Slade Island	15°29′31″S 124°33′23″E	
Slate Islands	15°31′55″S 124°24′0″E	
Slipper Island	34°2′44″S 122°45′11″E	
Slope Island	26°5′27″S 113°24′45″E	
Smith Islands	26°34′59″S 113°43′24″E	
Snag Island	29°56′10″S 114°58′32″E	
Solem Islands	14°12′19″S 125°38′25″E	
Solitary Island	21°8′3″S 115°50′0″E	
Solitary Island	19°55′27″S 119°54′50″E	
Somerville Island (Western Australia)	21°57′38″S 114°29′21″E	
South East Island (Western Australia)	20°25′27″S 115°35′19″E	
South East Islands	34°21′29″S 123°32′59″E	
South East Twin Island	16°17′38″S 123°5′24″E	
South Guano Island	26°32′45″S 113°41′26″E	
South Hummocks	16°14′6″S 128°45′50″E	
South Island	21°30′33″S 115°21′6″E	
South Island	12°11′25″S 96°55′21″E	
South Keeling Islands	12°11′25″S 96°55′21″E	
South Maret Island	14°26′28″S 124°59′5″E	
South Muiron Island	21°41′1″S 114°19′25″E	
South Passage Island	21°8′36″S 115°43′42″E	
South Twin Peak Island	34°0′27″S 122°48′12″E	
South Wailgwin Island	15°32′27″S 124°23′57″E	
South West Osborn Island	14°21′48″S 125°56′52″E	
South West Regnard Island	20°48′34″S 116°14′32″E	
South West Twin Island	21°31′18″S 115°12′4″E	
Southwest Island (Western Australia)	35°11′36″S 117°52′2″E	
Spar Island	20°29′15″S 115°33′43″E	
Sparkling Island	34°28′54″S 119°21′47″E	
Spider Island (Western Australia)	16°9′36″S 128°43′42″E	
Spindle Island	33°45′52″S 124°9′34″E	
Square Island	28°54′7″S 113°56′38″E	
Stanley Island	35°4′1″S 117°9′11″E	
Station Island	33°57′40″S 122°31′16″E	
Steamboat Island (Western Australia)	20°49′20″S 116°3′56″E	
Steep Head Island	14°26′36″S 125°59′26″E	
Steep Island	16°3′37″S 124°28′9″E	
Stewart Island	20°52′48″S 115°56′21″E	
Stewart Islands	13°41′41″S 126°53′39″E	
Stick Island	28°53′22″S 113°55′11″E	
Stokes Island	28°40′30″S 113°51′2″E	
Stony Island	35°6′30″S 117°47′7″E	
Storr Island	15°56′25″S 124°34′9″E	
Suffren Island	14°32′34″S 124°55′38″E	
Sunday Island	21°42′15″S 114°25′6″E	Pilbara
Sunday Island	16°24′25″S 123°11′13″E	Located at the entrance of King Sound
Sunday Island	26°7′32″S 113°14′6″E	Near Dirk Hartog Island
Suomi Island	28°42′45″S 113°50′17″E	
Survey Island	16°5′40″S 123°26′54″E	
Swan Island	16°21′10″S 123°2′37″E	
Sweet Island	28°55′1″S 113°52′17″E	

== T ==
Name	Coordinates	Remarks
Table Island (Western Australia)	21°36′46″S 114°43′3″E	
Table Island	33°54′51″S 122°35′42″E	
Talboys Island	16°23′43″S 123°4′1″E	
Tallon Island	16°24′57″S 123°7′17″E	
Tancred Island	14°20′20″S 125°24′23″E	
Tanner Island	16°5′46″S 123°31′44″E	
Tanpanmirri Island	15°5′2″S 125°21′12″E	
Tapani Island	28°40′30″S 113°51′16″E	
Tarrant Island	16°6′11″S 123°40′36″E	
Tattler Island	28°28′10″S 113°42′22″E	
Taylor Island	33°55′17″S 122°52′17″E	
Tent Island	21°59′55″S 114°30′52″E	
Termination Island	34°28′19″S 121°59′25″E	
Termite Hummocks	16°14′0″S 128°44′29″E	
Tern Island	30°18′52″S 114°59′32″E	
Thais Island	14°57′40″S 125°9′31″E	
The Island	27°38′9″S 117°52′29″E	
Thevenard Island	21°27′28″S 114°59′13″E	
Third Sister	28°29′46″S 113°44′23″E	
Thomas Island (Western Australia)	34°17′24″S 115°10′0″E	
Thomas Island	33°58′36″S 121°59′1″E	
Three Bays Island	26°33′15″S 113°38′46″E	
Thringa Island	21°18′33″S 115°39′31″E	
Tide Rip Islands	16°18′7″S 123°18′5″E	
Tidepole Island	20°38′57″S 116°42′18″E	
Titree Island	31°5′29″S 116°59′32″E	
Tizard Island	34°1′4″S 122°40′52″E	
Tjaulingari Island	14°40′0″S 125°8′17″E	
Tjungkurakutangari Island	14°48′11″S 125°8′28″E	
Tortoise Island	21°34′52″S 114°51′33″E	
Tory Islands	34°0′51″S 122°18′23″E	
Tournefort Island	14°48′31″S 125°1′47″E	
Tozer Island	20°27′25″S 116°50′20″E	
Traitors Island	28°29′6″S 113°46′57″E	
Traverse Island	16°14′45″S 124°6′47″E	
Travia Island	28°51′52″S 113°59′12″E	
Tree Island	16°23′16″S 123°18′28″E	
Tree Island	16°39′24″S 123°28′50″E	
Trimouille Island	20°23′45″S 115°33′44″E	
Trochus Island	14°29′10″S 125°29′26″E	
Troughton Island	13°45′13″S 126°11′2″E	
Tunney Island	33°57′43″S 122°48′44″E	
Turbin Island	14°28′38″S 125°0′10″E	
Turkey Island	15°31′37″S 128°22′38″E	
Turnstone Island	28°27′9″S 113°42′57″E	
Turtle Islands	19°53′25″S 118°53′44″E	
Twin Islands	34°56′37″S 118°22′21″E	
Twin Islands	21°31′1″S 115°12′30″E	
Tyra Island	16°26′41″S 123°6′9″E	
Tyrer Islands	16°17′9″S 123°23′37″E	

== See also ==
- Coastal regions of Western Australia
- List of islands of Western Australia
- List of islands of Western Australia, 0–9, A–C
- List of islands of Western Australia, D–G
- List of islands of Western Australia, H–L
- List of islands of Western Australia, M–Q
- List of islands of Western Australia, U–Z
- Sortable list of islands of Western Australia
