= Alexander Island (disambiguation) =

Alexander Island is the largest island in Antarctica.

Alexander Island may also refer to:

- Alexander Island (Nunavut)
- Alexander Island (Collie River), an island in the Collie River, Western Australia
- Alexander Island (Fitzroy River), an island in the Fitzroy River, Western Australia
- Alexander Island (Houtman Abrolhos), an island in the Houtman Abrolhos, Western Australia
- Rakahanga, formerly called Alexander Island in the Cook Islands
- Alexander Island (Texas) in Houston Texas
- Alexander Islands, in the Russian Arctic
