= Direction Island =

Direction Island may refer to:

- Direction Island, Antarctica, another name of Bearing Island in Antarctica
- Australia:
  - Direction Island, Cocos (Keeling) Islands 12°05′16″S 096°52′55″E
  - Direction Island (Kimberley coast) 16°25′40″S 123°08′56″E
  - Direction Island (Exmouth Gulf) 21°32′06″S 115°07′42″E
