= Freycinet =

Freycinet may refer to:

People

- Charles de Freycinet (1828–1923), French prime minister
- Louis de Freycinet (1779–1842), French Navy officer
- Rose de Freycinet (1794-1832), diarist and wife of Louis.

Places

- Cape Freycinet, Western Australia
- Henri Freycinet Harbour, Western Australia
- Freycinet Island, Western Australia
- Freycinet National Park, Tasmania
- Freycinet Peninsula, Tasmania

Other

- Freycinet gauge, standard governing the dimensions of the locks of some canals.
