= Gregory Island =

Gregory Island may refer to:

- Gregory Island (Antarctica) 76°49′S 162°58′E
- Gregory Island (Western Australia)
  - Gregory Island (Houtman Abrolhos) 28°53′55″S 114°00′19″E
  - Gregory Island (Kimberley coast) 16°18′59″S 123°18′31″E
