= List of islands of Western Australia, H–L =

This list includes all coastal and inland islands, cays, isles, and islets. It also includes named island groups, archipelagos and island clumps.

It is complete for the 1996 Gazetteer of Australia. Dubious names have been checked against the online 2004 data, and in all cases confirmed correct. However, if any islands have been gazetted or deleted since 1996, this list does not reflect these changes. Strictly speaking, Australian place names are gazetted in capital letters only; the names in this list have been converted to a mixed case under normal capitalisation conventions. Locations are as gazetted;, some islands may extend over large areas.

== H ==
Name	Coordinates	Remarks
Hagan Island	16°14′6″S 128°47′37″E	
Hale Island	14°23′20″S 125°24′42″E	
Hall Island	28°28′18″S 113°48′36″E	
Hamelin Island	34°13′28″S 115°0′48″E	
Hancock Island	16°25′48″S 123°9′18″E	
Harlequin Island	34°1′49″S 123°14′9″E	
Hartley Island	28°28′42″S 113°43′39″E	
Hasler Island	34°6′53″S 123°4′7″E	
Hastings Island	34°5′54″S 122°7′2″E	
Hauy Island	20°26′8″S 116°58′1″E	
Hawick Island	14°20′14″S 125°22′45″E	
Haycock Island	20°40′1″S 116°37′22″E	
Hazel Island	16°30′35″S 123°22′31″E	
Hecla Island	13°58′44″S 125°59′57″E	
Hedley Island	14°56′43″S 124°39′50″E	
Heirisson Island	31°57′58″S 115°52′50″E	
Helby Island	15°14′2″S 128°6′29″E	
Helipad Island	16°16′18″S 124°10′5″E	
Helms Island	28°40′10″S 113°51′38″E	
Helpman Islands	16°43′11″S 123°36′50″E	
Hendy Island	34°2′55″S 121°53′5″E	
Heney Island	16°29′54″S 123°22′51″E	
Henrietta Islands	16°24′54″S 123°38′45″E	
Herbert Islands	16°27′31″S 123°25′1″E	
Hermite Island	20°28′4″S 115°31′23″E	
Heywood Island	15°20′27″S 124°19′21″E	
Heywood Islands	15°20′27″S 124°19′21″E	
Hidden Island	16°13′32″S 123°28′3″E	
High Cliffy Islands	15°54′33″S 124°20′31″E	
High Island	16°21′9″S 123°20′12″E	
High Island	33°54′50″S 122°35′55″E	
Hollyhock Island	20°22′43″S 115°32′46″E	
Holtham Island	16°26′55″S 123°6′26″E	
Home Island	12°7′4″S 96°53′44″E	
Honeymoon Island	34°59′31″S 117°20′35″E	
Hood Island	34°8′34″S 122°2′53″E	
Hope Island	34°4′46″S 122°9′42″E	
Hope Island	22°10′16″S 114°28′7″E	
Horan Island	16°11′39″S 128°42′14″E	
Horatio Island	34°30′17″S 119°17′19″E	
Horsburgh Island	12°17′36″S 96°50′20″E	
Houtman Abrolhos	28°43′6″S 113°47′3″E	
How Island	20°25′14″S 115°33′9″E	
Howard Island	16°23′17″S 123°4′3″E	
Howe Island	34°8′57″S 122°1′16″E	
Hugo Island (Western Australia)	34°8′45″S 122°18′56″E	
Hull Island	33°58′6″S 122°50′32″E	
Hummock Island (Western Australia)	28°44′11″S 111°53′35″E	
Hummock Island (Western Australia)	28°48′2″S 114°2′20″E	
Hunt Island	16°24′5″S 123°13′31″E	
Hutchison Islands	26°6′47″S 114°14′5″E	

== I ==
Name	Coordinates	Remarks
Ibis Island	32°36′16″S 115°38′54″E	
Imp Island	16°22′57″S 123°8′15″E	
Ina Island	15°0′21″S 128°6′51″E	
Inner Island	35°0′16″S 118°9′37″E	
Inshore Island	33°55′0″S 122°49′38″E	
Institut Islands	14°8′27″S 125°41′9″E	
Intercourse Island	20°39′16″S 116°38′40″E	
Interview Island	20°39′16″S 116°38′40″E	
Investigator Island	34°2′59″S 120°53′59″E	
Iredale Island	14°54′49″S 124°40′56″E	
Iris Refuge Island	28°52′48″S 114°0′16″E	
Iron Islands (Western Australia)	16°10′4″S 123°47′41″E	
Irvine Island	16°4′35″S 123°32′14″E	
Islam Islets	22°13′16″S 114°25′37″E	
Ivy Island	20°29′42″S 115°32′35″E	

== J ==
Name	Coordinates	Remarks
Jacks Island	34°59′13″S 117°21′40″E	
Jackson Island	28°52′17″S 114°0′10″E	
Jackson Island	16°25′43″S 123°6′13″E	
Jackson Island	15°10′11″S 124°38′39″E	
Jar Island	14°9′12″S 126°14′4″E	
Jarman Island	20°39′35″S 117°12′58″E	
Jeegarnyeejip Island	32°34′53″S 115°46′20″E	
Jennala Island	32°34′27″S 115°45′48″E	
Joe Smith Island	28°40′55″S 113°51′28″E	
John Island	33°55′16″S 122°36′23″E	
Jon Jim Island	28°59′14″S 113°57′34″E	
Jones Island	13°45′29″S 126°21′31″E	
Jonquil Island	20°23′54″S 115°31′51″E	
Josey Island	16°14′26″S 128°46′30″E	
Jungulu Island	15°17′59″S 124°23′48″E	
Jussieu Island	14°42′53″S 124°58′34″E	

== K ==
Name	Coordinates	Remarks
Kangaroo Island	26°19′9″S 113°29′58″E	
Kanggurryu Island	14°43′24″S 128°37′57″E	
Kankanmengarri Island	14°22′32″S 125°40′29″E	
Kannamatju Island	15°27′36″S 124°29′27″E	
Karangi Island	20°26′5″S 115°36′7″E	
Kartja Island	14°51′51″S 125°10′44″E	
Katers Island	14°28′3″S 125°31′55″E	
Kathleen Island	16°3′59″S 123°33′18″E	
Keast Island	20°23′24″S 116°49′48″E	
Kendrew Island	20°28′44″S 116°32′11″E	
Kent Island	15°9′29″S 128°6′48″E	
Keraudren Island	14°56′33″S 124°41′2″E	
Kermadec Island	34°5′21″S 122°49′58″E	
Keru Island	28°43′34″S 113°49′57″E	
Kessel Island	16°29′26″S 123°21′39″E	
Kid Island	15°39′55″S 124°23′59″E	
Kidney Island	14°19′53″S 125°58′47″E	
Kilfoyle Island	16°13′25″S 128°46′47″E	
Kim Island	13°52′51″S 126°35′25″E	
Kimberley Island	33°57′2″S 122°28′2″E	
King Hall Island	16°4′52″S 123°24′29″E	
King Island	15°52′28″S 123°38′5″E	
Kingcup Island	20°23′30″S 115°31′50″E	
Kingfisher Island	16°6′5″S 124°4′47″E	
Kingfisher Islands	16°5′49″S 124°4′46″E	
Kingsmill Islands	14°10′0″S 125°46′43″E	
Koks Island	24°45′2″S 113°9′33″E	
Kolganu Island	16°23′55″S 123°9′38″E	
Koojarra Island	13°47′42″S 126°35′21″E	
Koolan Island	16°7′31″S 123°44′18″E	
Kuntjumal Kutangari Island	14°13′44″S 125°47′46″E	

== L ==
Name	Coordinates	Remarks
Lacepede Islands	16°52′11″S 122°9′30″E	
Lachlan Island	16°37′24″S 123°30′55″E	
Lacrosse Island	14°44′49″S 128°18′10″E	
Lady Nora Island	20°27′27″S 116°37′36″E	
Lafontaine Island	14°9′44″S 125°47′16″E	
Lagoon Island	28°52′22″S 113°59′39″E	
Lagoon Island	16°19′41″S 128°40′41″E	
Lagrange Island	14°12′43″S 125°45′55″E	
Lake Island	31°45′17″S 115°47′19″E	
Lalowan Island	16°26′22″S 123°8′46″E	
Lamarck Island	14°47′3″S 125°1′30″E	
Lammas Island	15°18′55″S 124°51′40″E	
Lancelin Island	31°0′27″S 115°18′53″E	
Laplace Island	14°11′26″S 125°39′28″E	
Large Island	21°17′47″S 115°30′2″E	
Laseron Island	15°13′52″S 124°31′2″E	
Latirus Island	15°13′52″S 124°31′22″E	
Lauangi Island	14°10′37″S 125°40′4″E	
Lavoisier Island	14°13′24″S 125°38′26″E	
Ledge Islet	34°51′13″S 116°5′52″E	
Lefebre Island	26°13′50″S 113°30′25″E	
Legendre Island	20°23′21″S 116°52′44″E	
Leila Island	16°30′28″S 123°22′55″E	
Leo Island	28°41′22″S 113°51′36″E	
Leonie Island (Western Australia)	16°24′49″S 123°5′36″E	
Lesueur Island	13°49′11″S 127°16′10″E	
Leveque Island	16°23′10″S 122°55′25″E	
Libke Island	34°13′15″S 122°4′3″E	
Lichen Island (Western Australia)	33°54′12″S 122°58′13″E	
Lily Island	20°25′15″S 115°35′7″E	
Lion Island	33°52′47″S 122°1′20″E	
Lion Islands	34°18′27″S 115°9′41″E	
Lipfert Island	30°1′28″S 114°57′32″E	
Little Island	31°48′47″S 115°42′25″E	
Little Island	34°27′28″S 121°59′19″E	
Little North Island	28°37′51″S 113°52′53″E	
Little Pigeon Island	28°27′49″S 113°43′20″E	
Little Rabbit Island	34°58′53″S 117°24′21″E	
Little Rat Island	28°43′41″S 113°47′7″E	
Little Rocky Island	21°26′3″S 115°24′44″E	
Little Roma Island	28°44′7″S 113°46′51″E	
Little Turtle Island	20°1′13″S 118°48′30″E	
Little Yunderup Island	32°35′28″S 115°45′43″E	
Livingstone Island	16°26′35″S 123°6′33″E	
Lizard Island	15°55′56″S 124°25′11″E	
Locker Island	21°42′59″S 114°45′56″E	
Long Island	28°28′20″S 113°46′21″E	
Long Island	13°57′36″S 126°18′23″E	
Long Island	21°47′37″S 119°25′38″E	
Long Island	16°34′26″S 123°22′11″E	
Long Island	21°0′51″S 115°50′59″E	
Long Island	34°2′57″S 121°57′42″E	
Longitude Island	16°3′34″S 123°24′1″E	
Lord Island	16°9′2″S 123°26′55″E	
Lorraine Island	33°57′0″S 122°33′46″E	
Louis Islands	13°59′55″S 126°32′40″E	
Louis Islands	14°0′27″S 126°32′23″E	
Low Island	20°41′32″S 116°34′29″E	
Low Island	14°9′53″S 126°17′27″E	
Lowendal Islands	20°38′56″S 115°34′17″E	
Lucas Island	15°12′31″S 124°29′21″E	
Lulim Island	15°32′43″S 124°24′41″E	

== See also ==
- Coastal regions of Western Australia
- List of islands of Western Australia
- List of islands of Western Australia, 0–9, A–C
- List of islands of Western Australia, D–G
- List of islands of Western Australia, M–Q
- List of islands of Western Australia, R–T
- List of islands of Western Australia, U–Z
- Sortable list of islands of Western Australia
