= Camp Island =

Camp Island may refer to:

- Camp Island (Nunavut), an arctic island in Canada
- Camp Island (Western Australia), an island in the Lyons River
