= Lamarck Island =

Lamarck Island may refer to:

- Lamarck Island (Antarctica) 66°40′S 140°2′E
- Lamarck Island, Western Australia 14°47′03″S 125°01′30″E
