= List of islands of Western Australia, U–Z =

This list includes all coastal and inland islands, cays, isles and islets. It also includes named island groups, archipelagos and island clumps.

This list is complete with respect to the 1996 Gazetteer of Australia. Dubious names have been checked against the online 2004 data, and in all cases confirmed correct. However, if any islands have been gazetted or deleted since 1996, this list does not reflect these changes. Strictly speaking, Australian place names are gazetted in capital letters only; the names in this list have been converted to mixed case in accordance with normal capitalisation conventions. Locations are as gazetted; some islands may extend over large areas.

== U ==
Name	Coordinates	Remarks
Umbanganan Island	15°26′21″S 124°36′26″E	
Umida Island	16°15′29″S 123°32′16″E	
Uncle Island	14°22′27″S 127°50′11″E	
Uncle Margie Island	28°52′4″S 113°57′59″E	
Unknown Island (Western Australia)	26°23′16″S 113°22′16″E	
Usborne Island	16°6′27″S 123°38′30″E	
Uwins Island	15°15′57″S 124°49′2″E	

== V ==
Name	Coordinates	Remarks
Valentine Island	17°5′11″S 123°19′26″E	
Vampire Island	20°41′16″S 117°11′3″E	
Varanus Island	20°39′3″S 115°34′27″E	
Verco Island	16°16′48″S 123°25′32″E	
Vickery Island	16°29′9″S 123°20′46″E	
Victor Island	21°55′20″S 114°25′48″E	
Viney Island	16°0′50″S 124°0′49″E	
Violet Island	20°23′24″S 115°34′39″E	
Vulcan Island	15°14′5″S 124°23′13″E	
Vulcan Islands	15°14′11″S 124°23′30″E	

== W ==
Name	Coordinates	Remarks
Wailgwin Island	15°31′55″S 124°24′0″E	Kimberley
Walcott Island	20°39′34″S 116°57′32″E	
Walker Island	14°18′0″S 125°18′51″E	
Wall Island	16°22′14″S 123°22′27″E	
Wallabi Group	28°28′2″S 113°42′22″E	
Wallace Island	32°0′48″S 115°33′12″E	
Wangania Island	16°1′42″S 123°32′27″E	
Wann Island	28°28′19″S 113°45′45″E	
Waring Island	15°0′53″S 124°47′48″E	
Warn Island	14°20′7″S 125°18′48″E	
Water Island	14°21′2″S 125°29′31″E	
Waterlow Islands	16°26′2″S 123°5′12″E	
Webb Island	29°58′36″S 114°57′33″E	
Wedge Island	30°49′46″S 115°11′12″E	
Weerdee Island	20°19′16″S 118°27′30″E	
Weld Island	21°23′15″S 115°32′28″E	
West Governor Island	13°56′45″S 126°41′8″E	
West Group	34°1′29″S 121°36′39″E	
West Intercourse Island	20°42′31″S 116°36′21″E	
West Island	12°10′1″S 96°49′18″E	
West Island	34°4′59″S 120°28′59″E	
West Island	16°51′15″S 122°6′28″E	
West Island	21°18′39″S 115°26′50″E	
West Lewis Island	20°35′28″S 116°37′31″E	
West Lyons Island	25°2′37″S 115°5′57″E	
West Mid Intercourse Island	20°40′37″S 116°39′14″E	
West Montalivet Island	14°18′13″S 125°13′11″E	
West Moore Island	20°38′24″S 117°40′7″E	
West Roe Island	16°21′52″S 123°11′13″E	
West Wallabi Island	28°28′3″S 113°41′12″E	
Westall Island	34°4′50″S 122°57′56″E	
Whaleback Island	33°44′40″S 124°5′12″E	
Whalebone Island	22°11′51″S 114°22′23″E	
Wharton Island	33°59′30″S 122°42′49″E	
Whipp Island	16°29′41″S 123°22′4″E	
Whirl Island	16°26′4″S 123°7′42″E	
White Island	26°26′38″S 113°45′41″E	
White Island	28°40′16″S 113°52′30″E	
White Island	34°57′0″S 117°58′35″E	
White Island	14°11′42″S 125°49′24″E	
White Island	15°3′44″S 124°19′28″E	
Whitley Island	14°56′10″S 124°41′37″E	
Whitlock Island	24°53′14″S 113°38′44″E	
Whitlock Island	30°19′12″S 114°59′32″E	
Whitmore Island	24°52′0″S 113°37′20″E	
Whitmore Island	22°22′18″S 114°11′53″E	
Whittaker Island	20°32′35″S 116°40′38″E	
Whittell Island	30°39′55″S 115°6′30″E	
Wickham Island	34°1′16″S 123°17′23″E	
Wickham Island	15°0′28″S 124°47′7″E	
Wiiluntju Island	14°25′54″S 125°30′30″E	
Wiirra Island	14°34′55″S 125°13′25″E	
Wilcox Island	20°27′2″S 116°50′22″E	
Wilds Island	26°27′6″S 113°36′54″E	
Wilson Island	34°6′57″S 121°59′40″E	
Wilson Island (Shark Bay)	26°9′55″S 113°39′33″E	
Winyalkan Island	14°33′16″S 125°25′35″E	
Wollaston Island	14°29′44″S 125°27′29″E	
Woninjaba Islands	16°14′13″S 124°5′13″E	
Wood Islands	16°23′22″S 123°19′31″E	
Wooded Island	28°45′7″S 113°48′20″E	
Woodward Island	14°51′9″S 124°43′55″E	
Woody Island	33°57′43″S 122°0′40″E	
Worallgarook Island	32°35′6″S 115°45′57″E	
Wulajarlu Island	15°57′16″S 124°18′13″E	
Wulalam Island	16°23′7″S 124°14′8″E	
Wurauwulla Island	14°39′47″S 125°7′47″E	
Wuwirriya Island	14°33′22″S 125°16′44″E	
Wybron Islands	16°27′42″S 123°20′43″E	

== Y ==
Name	Coordinates	Remarks
Y Island	21°57′13″S 114°25′6″E	
Yambaraba Island	16°9′5″S 128°43′47″E	
Yammadery Island	21°30′50″S 115°26′8″E	
Yankawingarri Island	14°9′23″S 125°39′23″E	
Yawajaba Island	15°57′38″S 124°12′18″E	
York Islands	34°0′21″S 122°35′9″E	
Yunderup Island	32°35′6″S 115°46′16″E	

== See also ==
- Coastal regions of Western Australia
- List of islands of Western Australia
- List of islands of Western Australia, 0–9, A–C
- List of islands of Western Australia, D–G
- List of islands of Western Australia, H–L
- List of islands of Western Australia, M–Q
- List of islands of Western Australia, R–T
- Sortable list of islands of Western Australia
