= Kidney (disambiguation) =

The kidney in human anatomy is a part of the urinary system.

Kidney may also refer to:

- Kidney (vertebrates), the kidney organ in vertebrate organisms
  - Mammalian kidney, the kidney in mammals
- Kidney (Chinese medicine)
- Kidney (food), the body part when used as food

== Places ==
- Kidney Island, Falkland Islands
- Kidney Island (Western Australia) on List of islands of Western Australia, H–L
- Kidney Island (Alaska) on List of islands of Alaska
- Kidney Lake on List of lakes in Carbon County, Montana

== People with the name ==
- David Kidney (born 1955), British politician
- Declan Kidney (born 1959), Irish rugby union coach
- Brian Kidney, hurler for Cork Minor Hurling Team
- Michael Kidney, hurler for Cork Hurling Team
- R. Brian Kidney, Chief Clerk of the California State Assembly
- Bob Kidney, see Tony Maimone

== See also ==
- Kidney bean, named for its resemblance to the human organ
