= Gould Island =

Gould Island may refer to:

- Gould Island (Antarctica), in Marie Byrd Land, Antarctica
- Gould Island (Rhode Island), United States 41°32′0.87″N 71°20′39.99″W
- Gould Island (Western Australia), Australia 33°57′56″S 122°51′25″E
