= Sunday Island =

Sunday Island may refer to:

== Australia ==
- Sunday Islet (Queensland)
- Sunday Island (Victoria)
- Sunday Island (Exmouth Gulf), Western Australia
- Sunday Island (King Sound), Western Australia
- Sunday Island (Shark Bay), Western Australia

== Other ==
- Raoul Island, also called "Sunday Island", Kermadec Islands, New Zealand
- Sunday Island (Sri Lanka), a Sri Lankan newspaper
