= Bridled Island =

Island on the Pilbara coast of Western Australia

- Location within Western Australia

Geography
- Location: Indian Ocean
- Coordinates: 20°38′23″S 115°33′22″E

Administration
- Australia
- State: Western Australia
- LGA: Shire of Ashburton

Bridled Island is located approximately 120 kilometres (75 mi) off the coast from Onslow in the Pilbara region of Western Australia.

== Description ==
The island is part of the Lowendal Islands archipelago, it is located just north of Varanus Island and approximately 12 kilometres (7 mi) east of the much larger Barrow Island.

The island has an area of 27 hectares (67 acres) and is made up of raised limestone rocks with sparse vegetation.

The Bridled tern is known to inhabit the island with 3000-4000 pairs being estimated from a survey in 1996.

The island is part of the Lowendal Islands Nature Reserve, which was established in 1976 and has a size of 179 hectares (440 acres).

== See also ==
- List of islands of Western Australia
