= Mistaken Island (Pilbara) =

Island in Western Australia

Coordinates: 20°39′19″S 116°39′42″E

Location of Mistaken Island

Mistaken Island is an uninhabited island in the Dampier Archipelago, in the Pilbara, Western Australia.

Its area is about 10 hectares (25 acres). It is connected to East Mid Intercourse Island, and thence to the mainland, by a causeway/bridge.

The island is adjacent to the Dampier salt evaporation pond and has been used as a salt port by Dampier Salt since 1972. Over 3.5 million tonnes (7.7 billion pounds) are exported annually, with the bulk of this going to industrial use.

== Nearby islands ==
- Intercourse Island
- Haycock Island (Western Australia)
- East Lewis Island
- East Intercourse Island
- East Mid Intercourse Island
- West Mid Intercourse Island
- West Intercourse Island
