= North West Twin Island =

Island of Kimberley region in Western Australia

Coordinates: 16°16′39″S 123°03′41″E

North West Twin Island on the map

North West Twin Island is an island in the Kimberley (Western Australia).

== See also ==
- List of islands of Western Australia
