= Burnside Island =

Island in Western Australia

- Location within Western Australia

Geography
- Coordinates: 22°06′21″S 114°30′31″E
- Area: 59 ha (150 acres)

Administration
- Australia

Burnside Island lies on the eastern side of Exmouth Gulf on the coast of Western Australia.

The southern tip of Burnside Island is located 1 kilometre (0.62 mi) due east of the northern end of Simpson Island. The low, straight, narrow 2-kilometre-long (1.2 mi) island faces west-northwest into the gulf. It consists of the narrow high-tide beach backed by low scarped calcarenite bluffs, and a low grassy ridge widening to 200 metres (660 ft) towards the northern end of the island. A 2-kilometre-wide (1.2 mi) mangrove-lined tidal creek backs the island. 1 kilometre (0.62 mi) to the north is Wilderness Island which is a more irregular, low 200-hectare (490-acre) island consisting of a more exposed west-facing side. Burnside Island is a popular bird watching and fishing location.

Burnside Island was named while the Royal Australian Navy was surveying the area in 1954.

== See also ==
- List of islands of Western Australia
