= Quoin Bluff =

Headland in Western Australia

Coordinates: 25°53′42″S 113°09′06″E

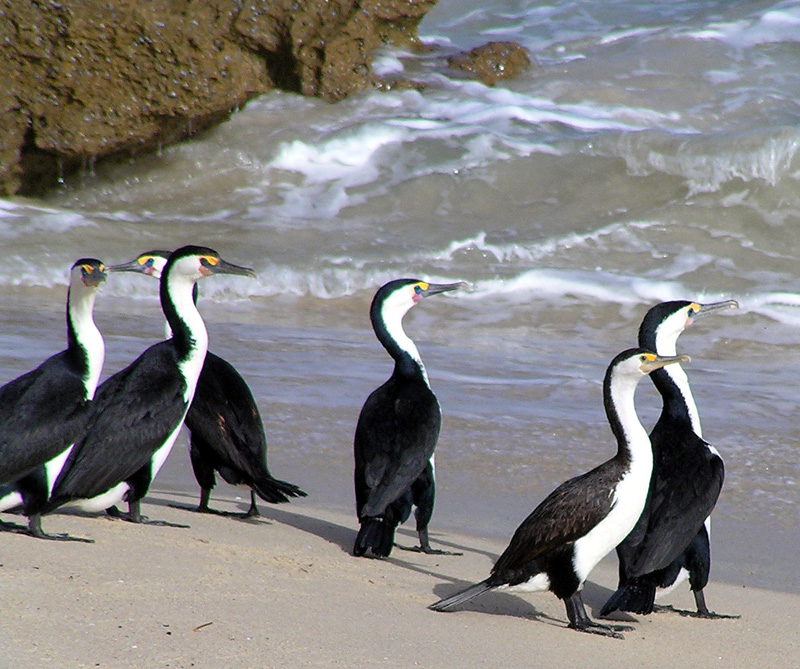
The headland holds an important nesting colony of pied cormorants

Quoin Bluff, also known as Quoin Bluff South, is an elevated limestone headland midway along the eastern side of Dirk Hartog Island, in Shark Bay, on the-west coast of Western Australia. It extends into Shark Bay between Herald Bay to the north and Tetrodon Loop to the south, and serves as a prominent navigation point with an all-round view of the approaches to Egg Island.

== History ==
The bluff was the site of a small garrison placed there by the Governor of Western Australia in 1850 to protect the guano deposits on Egg Island and other small islands nearby from being illegally exploited by foreign vessels while it was being legally mined. The garrison of 15 soldiers of the 99th Regiment, under the command of Lieutenant L. R. Elliot, arrived from Champion Bay in October and established a camp, named Irwin Station, consisting of a wooden building and tents. They subsequently constructed at least one building from local stone. They were armed with two cannons emplaced at the top of the bluff with a clear view of the bay. A 100-metre (330 ft) stone jetty was built into Herald Bay at the same time, the remains of which are now submerged at high tide. The camp was moved in May and, as the guano deposits were becoming exhausted, the garrison was recalled to Fremantle in July 1851.

== Birds ==
Quoin Bluff is one component of the Quoin Bluff and Freycinet Island Important Bird Area (IBA), identified as such by BirdLife International because it holds an important nesting colony of pied cormorants. Together with a similar colony on Freycinet Island some 80 kilometres (50 mi) to the south-east, it supports between 5,000 and 10,000 birds – over one per cent of the world population of the species.
