= Mermaid Island (album) =

Studio album by Mermaid Island
- Released: June 12, 2026
- Genres: Punk rock; skate punk
- Length: 33:23
- Labels: Anxious and Angry; No Dad Records
- Producers: Alexandra MacDonald; David Westerhout

Singles from Mermaid Island
- 1. "Freaks" Released: September 9, 2025; 2. "Perfectly Happy" Released: November 21, 2025; 3. "He Started It" Released: January 6, 2026; 4. "The Shit Split" Released: March 17, 2026; 5. "Ice Cream" Released: April 22, 2026; 6. "Panic Button" Released: June 2, 2026

Mermaid Island is the self-titled debut album by the punk rock band Mermaid Island. The album was released on vinyl by Anxious and Angry, and released digitally by No Dad Records. This is the band's only album recorded with bassist Rowen Kahn and drummer David Westerhout in the lineup, which lasted from 2023 to 2024.

== Critical reception ==
FemMetal gave the album 8/10 stars.

== Track listing ==
All tracks are written by Alexandra MacDonald, except "Mona Lisa" (MacDonald, Rafael Awada).

No.	Title	Length
1.	"Freaks"	3:03
2.	"Perfectly Happy"	3:08
3.	"Don't Ask"	2:14
4.	"He Started It"	3:16
5.	"Horse Shit"	3:33
6.	"Earth Is Boring"	1:14
7.	"Panic Button"	3:35
8.	"Ice Cream"	3:09
9.	"Subtitles"	2:59
10.	"Shit Out of Luck"	4:02
11.	"Mona Lisa"	3:10
Total length:		33:23

== Personnel ==
Credits are adapted from the album's liner notes.

Mermaid Island

- Alexandra MacDonald – lead vocals, guitar, production
- Rowen Kahn – bass, backing vocals
- David Westerhout – drums, backing vocals, production

Additional musicians

- Javier Pecos – additional guitar on all tracks except "Don't Ask," "Subtitles," and "Mona Lisa"

Technical

- Pat Dicenso – mastering
- Jordan Kulp – mixing
- Jacob Johnston – recording engineer

Artwork

- Benjamin Keefe – artwork
