= Molema Island =

Island in the Kimberley, Western Australia

- Location within Western Australia

Geography
- Location: Western Australia
- Coordinates: 16.2619°S 123.9045°E
- Area: 915 ha (2,260 acres)

Administration
- Australia

Demographics
- Population: 0

Molema Island is an island off the Kimberley coast of Western Australia.

Situated at the edge of Talbot Bay, Molema is connected to the mainland by Turtle Reef, one of the largest reef systems in the Kimberley. The island is surrounded by many mud flats, and the ria landscape is typical of the bioregion. Its geology is intensely faulted and folded and was later inundated by the Holocene post glacial transgression.

The island occupies an area of 915 hectares (2,261 acres).

The traditional owners of the area are the Worrorran peoples.

A population of the endangered northern quoll were found to be living on the island during surveys conducted in 2013.
