= Middle Island (King Sound) =

Island on Kimberley coast, Western Australia

- Location within Western Australia

Geography
- Coordinates: 16°26′55″S 123°05′02″E

Administration
- Australia

Middle Island is an island in King Sound in the Kimberley region of Western Australia.
