= Y Island =

Island in Western Australia

- Location within Western Australia

Geography
- Location: Indian Ocean
- Coordinates: 21.9°S 114.4°E

Administration
- Australia
- State: Western Australia

Y Island is a small island located in the Exmouth Gulf of Western Australia. The area is a popular one for Kayak fishing.
