= Bessieres Island =

Island in Western Australia

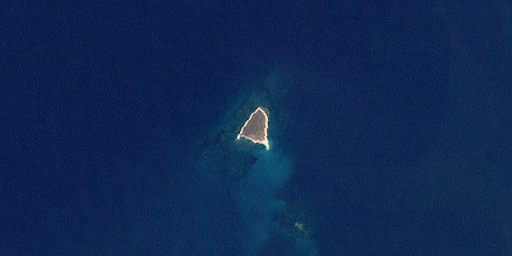
- LANDSAT image of Bessieres Island

- Location within Western Australia

Geography
- Coordinates: 21°31′29″S 114°45′46″E
- Area: 55 ha (140 acres)
- Length: 1.1 km (0.68 mi)
- Width: 0.8 km (0.5 mi)

Administration
- Australia
- State: Western Australia
- Region: Pilbara
- LGA: Shire of Ashburton

Demographics
- Population: Uninhabited

Bessieres Island is a small island off the Pilbara coast of north-west Australia. It is uninhabited, however it does contain a lighthouse.

The most recent total Solar eclipse visible from Western Australia could be seen from Bessieres Island, on April 20, 2023.

The Bessieres Island Nature Reserve was declared in 2000 and has a size of 55 hectares (140 acres).
