= Thevenard Island =

Island in Western Australia

- Location of Thevenard Island in Western Australia
- Location within Western Australia

Geography
- Location: Indian Ocean
- Coordinates: 21°27′24″S 114°59′59″E

Administration
- Australia
- State: Western Australia
- LGA: Shire of Ashburton

Thevenard Island is located approximately 22 kilometres (14 mi) off the coast of Onslow in the Pilbara region of Western Australia. The majority of the island and the waters around it are covered by the Thevenard Island Nature Reserve, which was declared a protected area in 1975 and had a size of 2,172 hectares (5,370 acres).

== Description ==
Thevenard Island is the largest of a group of ten islands and atolls unofficially called the Mackerel Islands. Two islands in the group, Thevenard Island and Direction Island, have accommodation for tourists. There is a 1,000-metre (3,281 ft) brick paved runway on Thevenard. The island can be reached by a ferry service operating from the mainland at Onslow, recreational boats, helicopter and light scenic plane.

Thevenard Island is approximately 6 kilometres (4 mi) in length and occupies a total area of 550 hectares (1,359 acres). It is surrounded by limestone reefs and platforms, with diverse coral assemblages on the northern side. Areas of deep sandy soil are found on the island supporting Acacia and Triodia shrubland and coastal heath scrub.

Tourism facilities exist in a resort on Thevenard Island including accommodation, a general store, barbeques, boat moorings, an airstrip and fuel facilities. There is also a solar power and desalination plant providing fresh water to the island. Available activities include fishing, diving and snorkelling.

== Fauna ==
Extend of the Thevenard Island Nature Reserve

Classified as a C class nature reserve, Thevenard Island is visited by green sea turtles, flatback sea turtles, loggerhead sea turtles and hawksbill sea turtles who lay their eggs on the beaches between November and March.

The waters off-shore are also home to several species of dolphins including bottlenose, spinner, striped, common and humpback dolphins.

Whales that have been observed in the area include the pilot whale, false killer whale, sei whale, bryde's whale and humpback whales. Humpbacks migrate south from June to October, with calving taking place in August.

Dugongs (sea cows) are also found in waters around the island and can be observed feeding and calving in waters less than 5 metres (16 ft) deep. Dugong breeding occurs between September and April.

Twenty-four species of land birds have been recorded on Thevenard Island. In addition, there are up to 31 species of migratory birds occurring in the Mackerel Islands area, including kestrels, quails, godwits, plovers, sandpipers and harriers. Some birds migrate from remote northern hemisphere locations as far as Siberia, and are protected by international treaties. Seabirds, such as terns and shearwaters, nest from October to January.

A total of nine reptile species have been recorded on the island including goannas, dragons, skinks, geckos and ta-ta lizards. No rare or endangered reptiles have been recorded.

The only native land mammal on the island is the endangered forrest's mouse or short-tailed mouse. The domestic mouse also inhabits the island and is most likely to have been introduced.

== History ==
The island was visited by indigenous Australians before and after its separation from the mainland, approximately 8,000 years ago.

Thevenard Island was named in 1801 by the Baudin expedition to Australia after French naval officer Antoine-Jean-Marie Thévenard (1733–1815).

In 1964, Onslow local residents Ian Blair and Adrian Day were granted a lease on Thevenard Island and Direction Island by the Government of Western Australia. In 1973, a group of local farmers purchased the business. From there, the accommodation and facilities on the islands developed from beach shacks used by fishermen to a fully fledged tourism operation. The same group of farmers developed the Onslow Mackerel Motel on the mainland in 1997.

WAPET (WA Petroleum) discovered the Saladin oil field just off Thevenard Island in 1985, followed by further discoveries including a series of gas fields, leading to the North West Shelf Project on the Burrup Peninsula, the Gorgon project on Barrow Island and the Wheatstone Project on the mainland in Onslow. The company was granted a 25 hectares (62 acres) lease to build production facilities on Thevenard Island; the first oil was produced from the project in 1989. Other fields were brought online between 1991 and 1998 using facilities both off-shore and on Thevenard itself. In 2000, Chevron Australia became the operator of the oil and gas exploration and production assets previously managed by WAPET. Production from off-shore oil fields including Saladin ceased in 2014. The new owners, Chevron Corporation, tried to sell the facilities on Thevenard without success. The decision was made in 2015 to decommission the site, with the removal of all plant, road and footing expected to take two years. The operators of the remaining land lease and tourism business on Thevenard and Direction Islands, Mackerel Islands Pty Ltd, state as of 2017 "The Mackerel Islands and WA Petroleum have maintained a harmonious and collaborative association throughout the past 30 years of operation. Currently decommissioning of the projects is under way, where some of the infrastructure still stands on Thevenard Island. In the coming years this will be removed, leaving Mackerel Islands to devote sole use of Thevenard Nature Reserve to developing eco-tourism facilities and activities."

The MV Boa Force was shipwrecked off the island when the anchor handling tug supply vessel struck a wellhead in 1994. All eleven crew were rescued; Boa Force was later raised and subsequently scuttled in deep water.

== Turtle monitoring project ==
The Government of Western Australia's Department of Parks and Wildlife (now the Department of Biodiversity, Conservation and Attractions) conducted a pilot flatback turtle monitoring project on Thevenard Island in 2016, which continues annually, having identified Thevenard Island as an important turtle nesting site. The pilot project was part of the North West Shelf Flatback Turtle Conservation Program's monitoring program, which was established to help understand the ecology and demography of the North West Shelf flatback stock, which includes populations found off the Pilbara and south-west Kimberley coasts.

Flatbacks are listed as vulnerable under the Western Australian Wildlife Conservation Act 1950. Internationally they are considered data deficient, meaning that more research is required to determine their abundance and distribution.

The North West Shelf Flatback Conservation Program is a $32.5 million, 30-year program funded by the Chevron-operated Gorgon gas project and is administered by Parks and Wildlife.
