= Don Island =

Island in British Columbia

- Interactive map of Don Island

Geography
- Location: Fraser River
- Coordinates: 49.16021°N 122.99075°W

Administration
- Canada
- British Columbia

Demographics
- Population: 0

Don Island is a small uninhabited island in the Fraser River within metropolitan Vancouver, British Columbia, located just west of Annacis Island. While currently devoid of any permanent settlement, between 1901 and the 1940s Don Island and its neighbor Lion Island were home to over 400 Japanese Canadians, who were mainly employed at the Ewen Cannery, which was one of the largest salmon canneries in British Columbia.

They were known to the Japanese Canadians as Oikawa-Jima and Sato-Jima. At one point, a 600ft long wharf stood facing the main channel.

The majority of these workers left after 1924, to pursue work in other areas of the city. A few families remained throughout the 1930s, but they were all forcibly removed in 1942 and sent to internment camps. The islands have remained uninhabited since, with the rundown ruins of the cannery, the wharf and other buildings all that remains.

In 2013, students from SFU conducted a research field-study on Don and Lion Islands, studying the remains of various buildings used by workers at the Ewen Cannery, as well as a Japanese fishing camp.
