= Pumpkin Islands =

Island in New Brunswick, Canada

Geography
- Location: Bay of Fundy

Administration
- Canada
- Province: New Brunswick
- County: Charlotte
- Parish: Grand Manan Parish

The Pumpkin Islands are undeveloped islands in the Grand Manan Parish of Charlotte County, New Brunswick, Canada in the Bay of Fundy.

There is West Pumpkin Island and Pumpkin Islet, half a mile north of White Head Island.

As of 2011, Admiral Fish Farms had salmon weirs off Pumpkin Island.
