= Oliver Island (Western Australia) =

Island in Kimberley region of Western Australia

Oliver Island (14°05′38″S 125°44′23″E) is located off the Kimberley coast of Western Australia.
