= Long Island (Western Australia) =

- Location within Western Australia

Geography
- Coordinates: 16.5697°S 123.3690°E
- Area: 1,136 ha (2,810 acres)

Administration
- Australia

Demographics
- Population: 0

Long Island is an island off the Kimberley coast of Western Australia.

It is situated about at the northern end of King Sound approximately 40 kilometres (25 mi) east of Bardi, it is a part of the Buccaneer Archipelago.

The island occupies an area of 1,136 hectares (2,807 acres).
