= Dicks Island =

Island in New Brunswick, Canada

- Interactive map of Dicks Island

Geography
- Location: Bay of Fundy
- Coordinates: 45°08′25″N 66°59′50″W
- Area: 1.65 ha (4.1 acres)

Administration
- Canada
- Province: New Brunswick
- County: Charlotte
- Parish: Saint Patrick Parish

Dicks Island is an undeveloped island in the St. Patrick Parish of Charlotte County, New Brunswick, Canada, in the Bay of Fundy.

The Nature Trust of New Brunswick owns the island as a nature preserve since 2003, when it was donated by Jack and Anne Disher In 2020, a parcel of land in Bocabec was donated to the Nature Trust in honour of the Dishers' memory.
