= East Intercourse Island =

Island in Western Australia

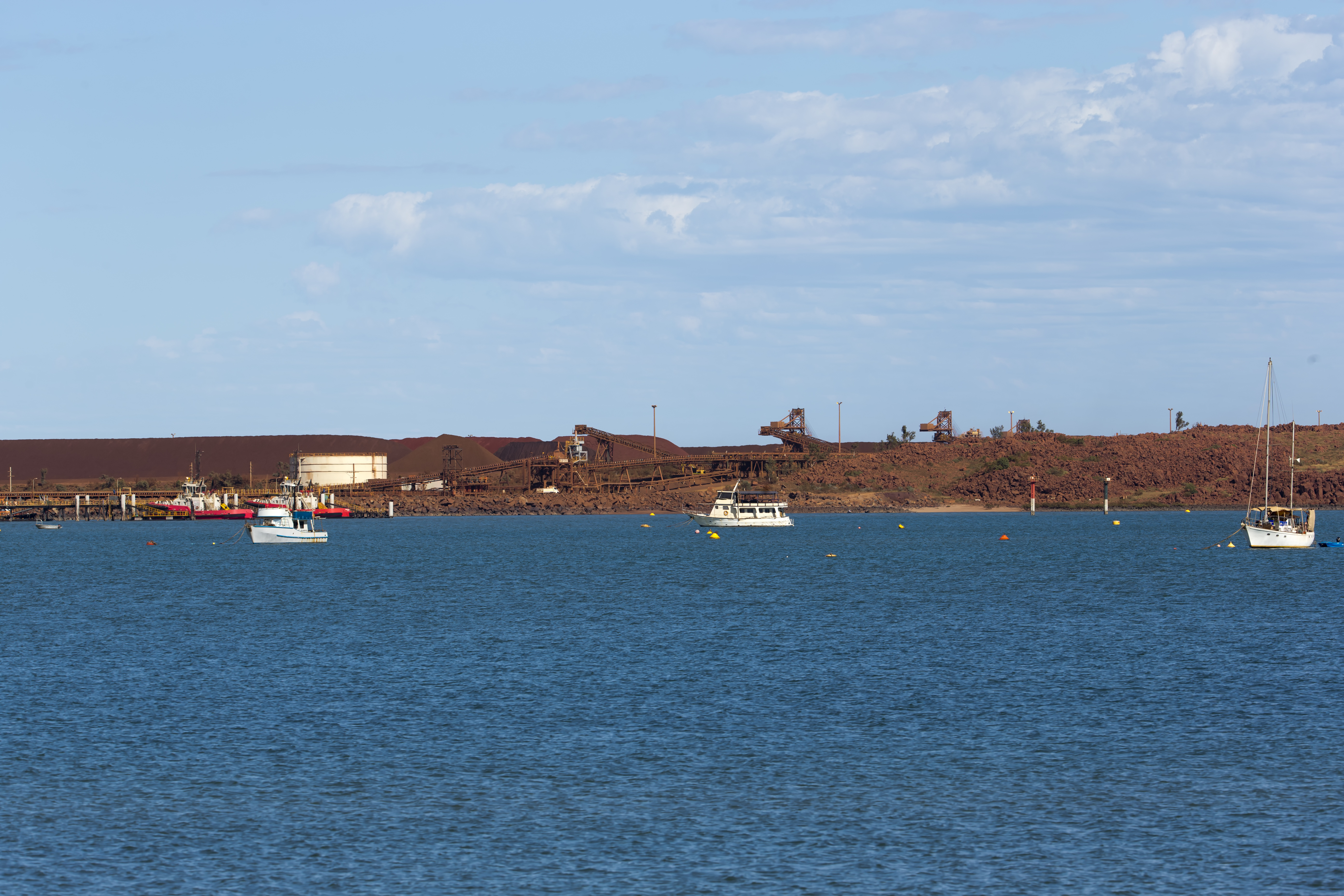
- East Intercourse Island, as seen in the background on 3 March 2014

- Location within Western Australia

Geography
- Location: Indian Ocean
- Coordinates: 20.65339°S 116.6844°E
- Area: 2.5 km^{2} (0.97 sq mi)

Administration
- Australia
- State: Western Australia

East Intercourse Island is an uninhabited island in the Dampier Archipelago, in the Pilbara, Western Australia. It is around 250 hectares (620 acres) in size.

The island is a major iron ore loading port owned and operated by Pilbara Iron, a subsidiary of Rio Tinto Iron and Titanium (RTIT).

The lay-by berth can be considered a normal berth without a jetty structure that allows up to 50 vessels per year to berth without having to wait for a tidal vessel to sail.

In 1984, MV Shinho Maru loaded at East Intercourse Island with the first cargo greater than 200,000 tonnes (440 million pounds) to be dispatched from any Australian port.

On 4 June 2011, the port was the scene of the workplace death of Irish scaffolder Shaun McBride. He fell into the port and drowned after his work platform collapsed.

== Nearby Islands ==
- Mistaken Island
- Haycock Island (Western Australia)
- East Lewis Island
- Intercourse Island
- East Mid Intercourse Island
- West Mid Intercourse Island
- West Intercourse Island
