= Gregory Island (Antarctica) =

Ice-free island of Antarctica

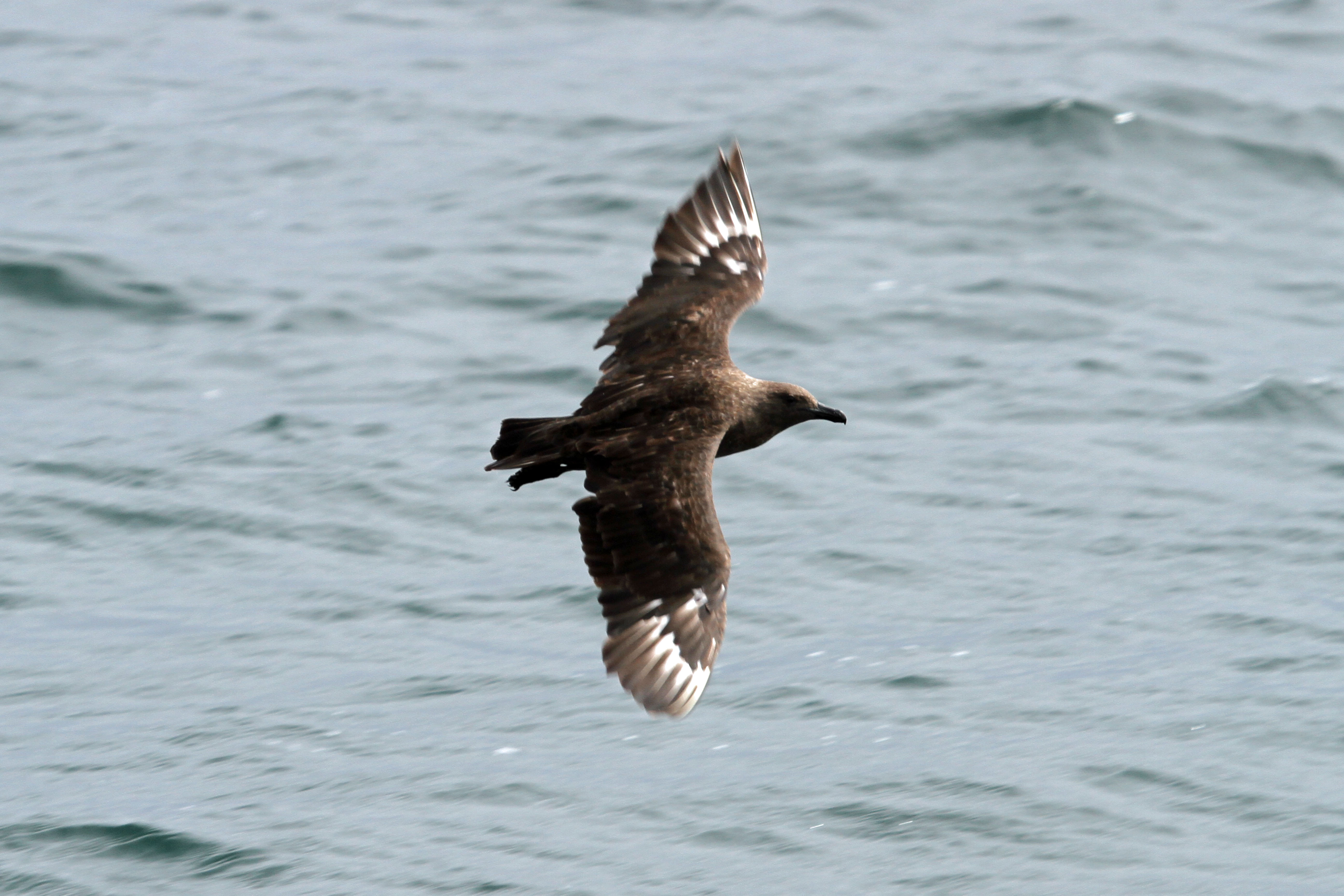
- South polar skuas breed on the island

- Location within Antarctica

Geography
- Location: Victoria Land, Antarctica
- Coordinates: 76°48′51″S 162°57′44″E
- Area: 70 ha (170 acres)
- Length: 1.2 km (0.75 mi)
- Width: 0.8 km (0.5 mi)
- Highest elevation: 100 m (300 ft)

Administration
- Administered under the Antarctic Treaty System

Demographics
- Population: Uninhabited

Gregory Island is a small ice-free island lying just off the east coast of Victoria Land, Antarctica, 5 km (3.1 mi) north-east of Cape Archer and 8 km (5.0 mi) south of Cape Ross. It was discovered by the British National Antarctic Expedition (1901–04), at which time it was thought to be a coastal point and was named "Gregory Point," for John Walter Gregory, director of the civilian staff of the expedition. It was determined to be an island by the British Antarctic Expedition, 1910–13.

== Important Bird Area ==
A 51 ha site comprising the whole island has been designated an Important Bird Area (IBA) by BirdLife International because it supports a colony of south polar skuas, with an estimate of about 120 breeding pairs made in 1983. The nearest permanent research station the USA's McMurdo Station and New Zealand's Scott Base lying about 150 km to the south-east on Ross Island.

== See also ==
- List of Antarctic and Subantarctic islands
