= Baudin Island (Shark Bay) =

Island in Western Australia

Baudin
- Location within Western Australia

Geography
- Location: Indian Ocean
- Coordinates: 26°30′54″S 113°39′00″E
- Area: 0.20 km^{2} (0.077 sq mi)

Administration
- Australia
- Territory: Western Australia

Baudin Island is a small island (20 hectares or 49 acres) in Henri Freycinet Harbour, the southern part of Shark Bay in Western Australia. The island was named after the French explorer Nicolas Baudin, who passed through the region.

It is also a reserve with the name Baudin Island Nature Reserve within the Shark Bay Marine Park and Shark Bay World Heritage area.

== See also ==
- List of islands in Shark Bay

Map of the Shark Bay region
