= Seal Island (Hopetoun, Western Australia) =

Island in Western Australia

Seal Island (33°57′46″S 120°7′40″E) is located near Hopetoun in the Goldfields–Esperance region of Western Australia.
