= Intercourse Island =

Island in Western Australia

- Location within Western Australia

Geography
- Location: Indian Ocean
- Coordinates: 20°39′12.204″S 116°38′45.96″E
- Archipelago: Dampier
- Area: 25 ha (62 acres)
- Length: 1 km (0.6 mi)
- Width: 0.6 km (0.37 mi)

Administration
- Australia
- Electoral Division: Division of Durack
- State electorate: Pilbara
- LGA: City of Karratha

Demographics
- Population: 0
- Ethnic groups: Yinidbarndi, Yaburara, Mardudhunera, Woon-goo-tt-oo

Additional information
- Time zone: AWST (UTC+8)

Intercourse Island is an uninhabited island in the Dampier Archipelago, in the Pilbara region of Western Australia. It is about 1,300 kilometres (810 mi) north of the state capital Perth.

Although Intercourse Island and its surrounding area are almost uninhabited, with a density of less than two people per one square kilometre (0.39 sq mi), it is located in a major minerals export area. The climate conditions in the area are arid. The average annual rainfall is 409 millimetres (16.1 in). The wettest month is January, with an average of 148 millimetres (5.8 in) of precipitation, and the driest is August, with 1 millimetre (0.039 in) of precipitation.

== Naming ==
The island was named after the intercourse (communication, dealings) between the explorer Captain Philip Parker King, and the natives.

== Nearby islands ==
- Mistaken Island
- Haycock Island (Western Australia)
- East Lewis Island
- East Intercourse Island
- East Mid Intercourse Island
- West Mid Intercourse Island
- West Intercourse Island
