= Saddle Island (Western Australia) =

Island in Western Australia

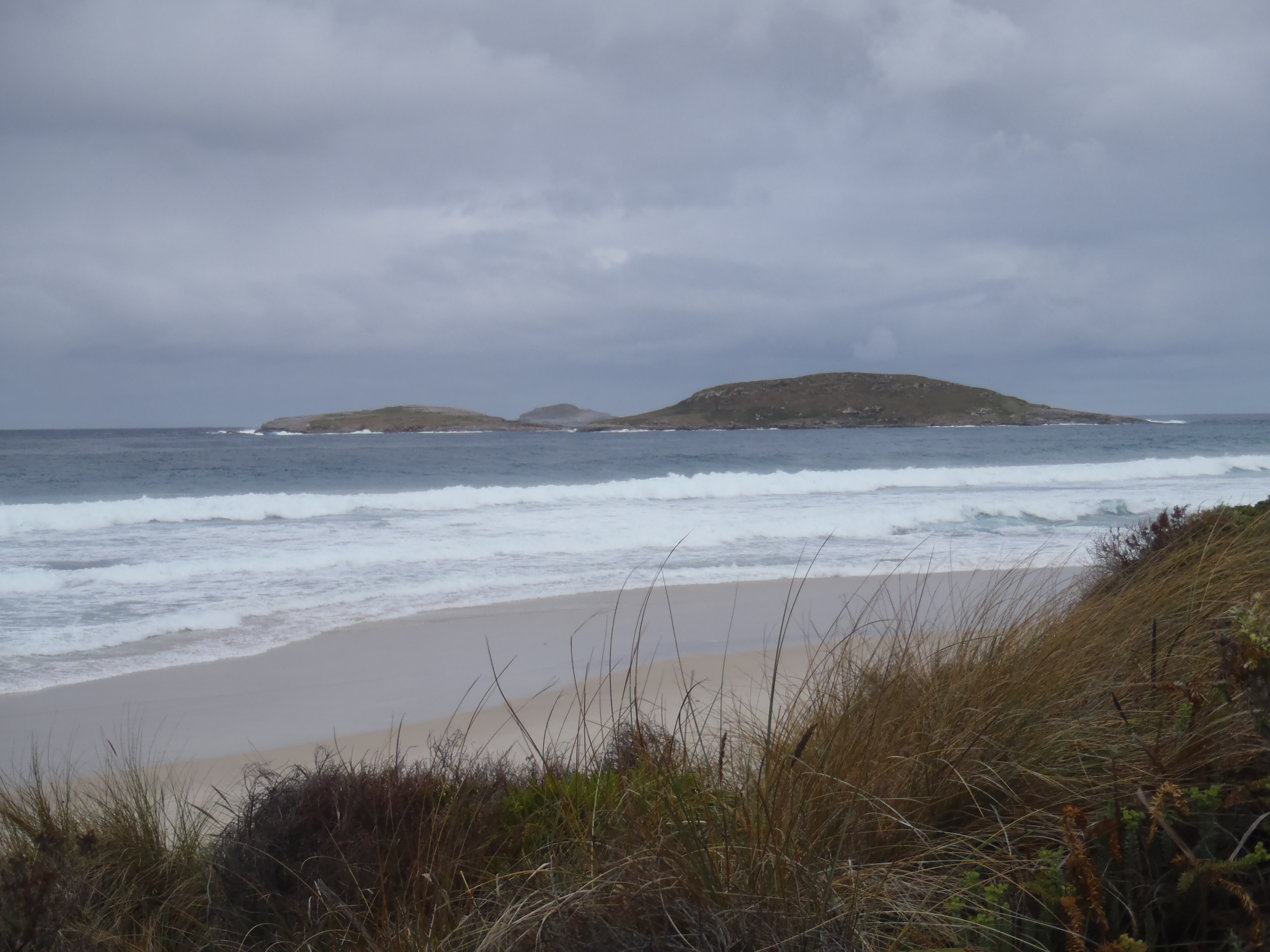
- Saddle Island from the beach at Walpole-Nornalup National Park

Geography
- Coordinates: 36°03′02″S 116°43′50″E

Administration
- Australia

Saddle Island is an island located in the Great Southern region of Western Australia. The island is situated approximately 1 km (0.62 mi) off shore and is about 26 ha (64 acres) in area.

Situated in the Southern Ocean, the island is adjacent to Nornalup Inlet and the Walpole-Nornalup National Park.

Saddle Island is the largest of the nearby islands that are all gazetted as part of Class A Reserve 31362. Other islands that make up part of the reserve are Goose Island (directly south of Saddle Island) and the Casurina Islands.

The flesh-footed shearwater and the little shearwater are both known to inhabit the island and use it as a breeding ground.
