= Alexander Island (Texas) =

Island in Harris County, Texas, United States

Coordinates: 29.718°N 95.034°W

Alexander Island is an island in the Houston Ship Channel in Harris County, Texas. It is located near Baytown and La Porte and is viewable on the Fred Hartman Bridge.

In September 2013, the U.S. Army Corps of Engineers Galveston District awarded a contract in the amount $1,369,515.74 to Integris Projects for dewatering of the Alexander Island Placement Area relating to the Houston Ship Channel in Harris County.

Dewatering allows for the outflow of excess water and increases the placement area's capacity to hold more dredge material. This process is part of the district's Dredged Area Management Program (DAMP) which ensures placement areas are prepared for future dredging activities.
