= Eagle Island (Western Australia) =

Island in Western Australia

Coordinates: 26°05′S 113°35′E

Location of Eagle Island (Western Australia)

Eagle Island is about 200 metres (660 ft) from Eagle Bluff on the Peron Peninsula in Shark Bay World Heritage Site in the Gascoyne region of Western Australia.

It is a sand island with an area of about 1,000 square metres (11,000 sq ft), and an elevation of 8 metres (26 ft).

The island's vegetation is a closed heath, of which the dominant plant species is Nitraria billardierei (nitre bush). Other plant species include Limonium salicorniaceum; Sporobulus virginicus; species of Calandrinia, Pelargonium, Poa and Selenothamnus; and an introduced species of Chenopodium. Silver gulls nest on the island, and a small number of pied cormorants roost there.

== See also ==
- List of islands of Western Australia
