= Mermaid Island =

American punk rock band

- Origin: Los Angeles, California, U.S.
- Genres: Punk rock; skate punk
- Years active: 2022–present
- Labels: Anxious and Angry; No Dad Records
- Members: Alexandra MacDonald; Jenna Terranova; Jesse Shafer; Judah Bell
- Past members: Rowen Kahn; Sander Bryce; David Westerhout; Cameron Nino; Danté Thurkill; Andy Hoopes; Rachel Moon
- Website: mermaidislandband.com

Mermaid Island is an American punk rock band from Los Angeles, California.

== History ==
The band was founded in October 2022 by Canadian lead vocalist and guitarist Alexandra MacDonald, Canadian-American bassist Rowen Kahn, and American drummer Sander Bryce. MacDonald grew up in Cape Breton, Nova Scotia. Bryce was replaced on drums by David Westerhout, who frontwoman Alexandra MacDonald met during a vocal session shortly before the band was founded. The lineup of MacDonald, Kahn, and Westerhout recorded their self-titled debut album, released on June 12, 2026.

Westerhout left the band in 2024 and was replaced by his predecessor, Bryce. Kahn left the band in late 2025 and was replaced by Danté Thurkill. Bryce left the band again in late 2024 and was replaced by Jenna Terranova. Guitarist Jesse Shafer joined the band in early 2026. Thurkill left the band in May 2026 and was replaced by Judah Bell.

The band released the third single, "Ice Cream," on April 22, 2026.

The band's self-titled debut album was released on June 12, 2026.

The sixth and final single and music video for the self-titled debut album, "Panic Button," was released on June 2, 2026.

== Members ==
Current members

- Alexandra MacDonald – lead vocals, guitar (2022–present)
- Jenna Terranova – drums, backing vocals (2025–present)
- Jesse Shafer – guitar, backing vocals (2026–present)
- Judah Bell – bass, backing vocals (2026–present)

Former members

- Rowen Kahn – bass, backing vocals (2022–2025)
- Sander Bryce – drums (2022–2023, 2024)
- David Westerhout – drums, backing vocals (2023–2024)
- Cameron Nino – guitar (2024)
- Danté Thurkill – bass, backing vocals (2025–2026; substitute 2026)
- Andy Hoopes – guitar (2025)
- Rachel Moon – guitar, backing vocals (2026)

== Discography ==
=== Studio albums ===
- Mermaid Island (June 12, 2026) (Anxious and Angry/No Dad Records)

=== Singles ===
Title	Release date		Album
"Freaks" (No Dad Records)	September 9	2025	Mermaid Island
"Perfectly Happy"	October 21	2025	Mermaid Island
"He Started It" (No Dad Records)	January 6	2026	Mermaid Island
The Shit Split	March 17	2026	Mermaid Island
"Ice Cream" (No Dad Records)	April 22	2026	Mermaid Island
"Panic Button" (No Dad Records)	June 2	2026	Mermaid Island
