= Cohen Island =

Island in Alaska, United States

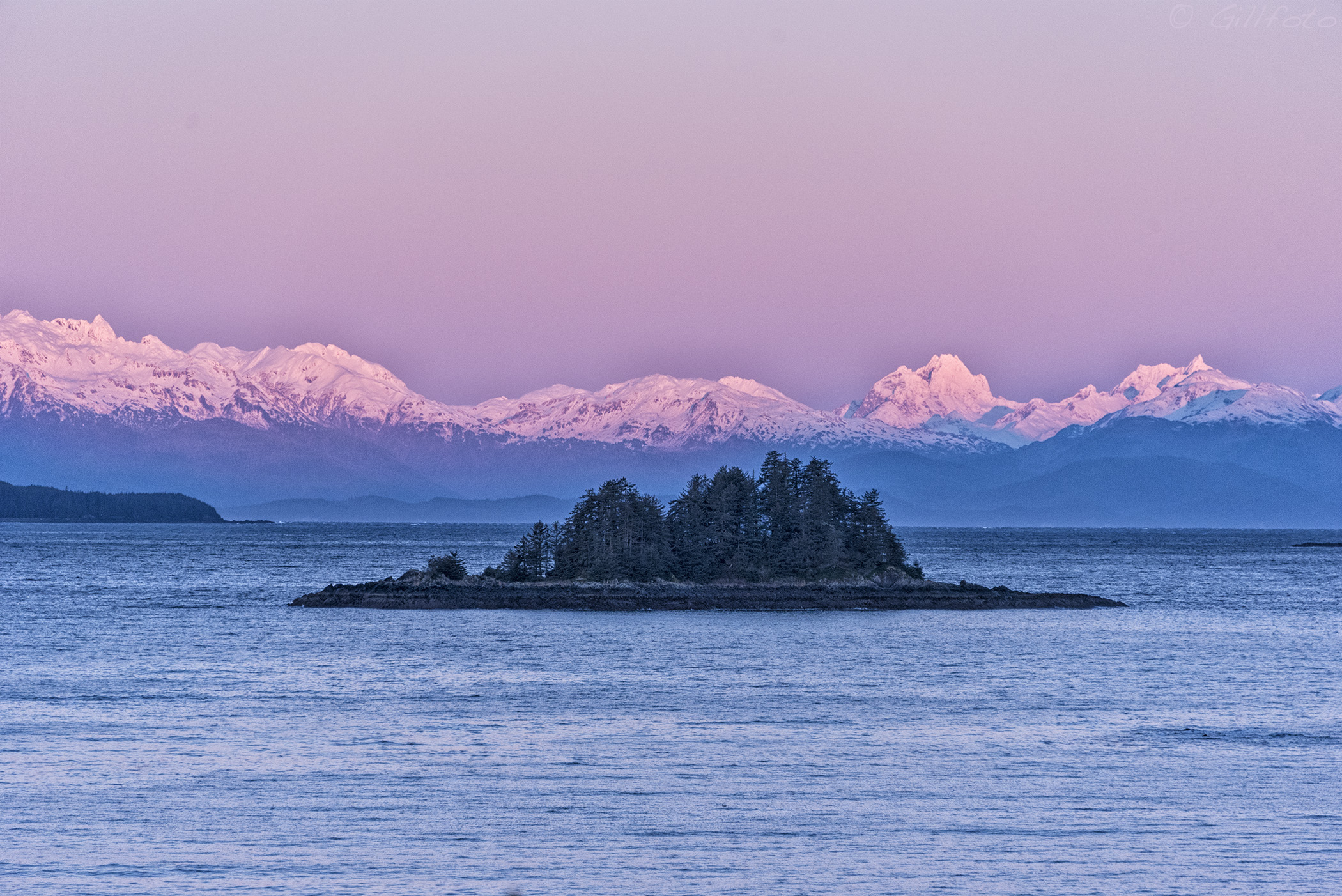
- Interactive map of Cohen Island

Geography
- Location: Juneau City and Borough, Alaska
- Coordinates: 58°26′00″N 134°46′47″W
- Archipelago: Alexander Archipelago
- Length: 0.1 mi (0.2 km)
- Highest elevation: 0 ft (0 m)

Administration
- United States
- State: Alaska
- Borough: Juneau

Cohen Island is an island within the borders of the City and Borough of Juneau, Alaska, United States. Located off the eastern shore of Favorite Channel, it is 1 mile (1.6 km) northwest of Point Stephens and 16 miles (26 km) northwest of the city of Juneau. It is a part of the Channel Islands State Marine Park.

Cohen Island is forested and characterized by cliffs and headlands around its perimeter, lacking any sufficient landing sites. Black oystercatchers are often seen looking for food in the vicinity of the island. According to the Juneau State Land Plan, commercial recreation leasing is prohibited on Cohen Island.

It was named by the United States Coast and Geodetic Survey and first published on a chart in 1893. Historian R. N. DeArmond believed Cohen Island was named after a resident of Juneau and Sitka.
