= East Mid Intercourse Island =

Island in Western Australia

Coordinates: 20°40′2″S 116°40′1″E

Location of East Mid Intercourse Island

East Mid Intercourse Island is an uninhabited island in the Dampier Archipelago, in the Pilbara, Western Australia. It has an area about 41 hectares (100 acres); it is connected by a causeway bridge to the mainland and also to Mistaken Island further out.

The island is adjacent to the Dampier saltern and is used by Dampier Salt to carry salt to the port at Mistaken Island.

== Nearby islands ==
- Intercourse Island
- Haycock Island (Western Australia)
- East Lewis Island
- East Intercourse Island
- Mistaken Island
- West Mid Intercourse Island
- West Intercourse Island
