= Glauert Island =

Island in Western Australia

- Location within Indian Ocean

Geography
- Coordinates: 15.0661°S 124.9689°E
- Area: 856 ha (2,120 acres)

Administration
- Australia

Demographics
- Population: 0

Glauert Island is an island off the Kimberley coast of Western Australia.

The island occupies an area of 856 hectares (2,115 acres).
