= Direction Island (Exmouth Gulf) =

Island of Western Australia

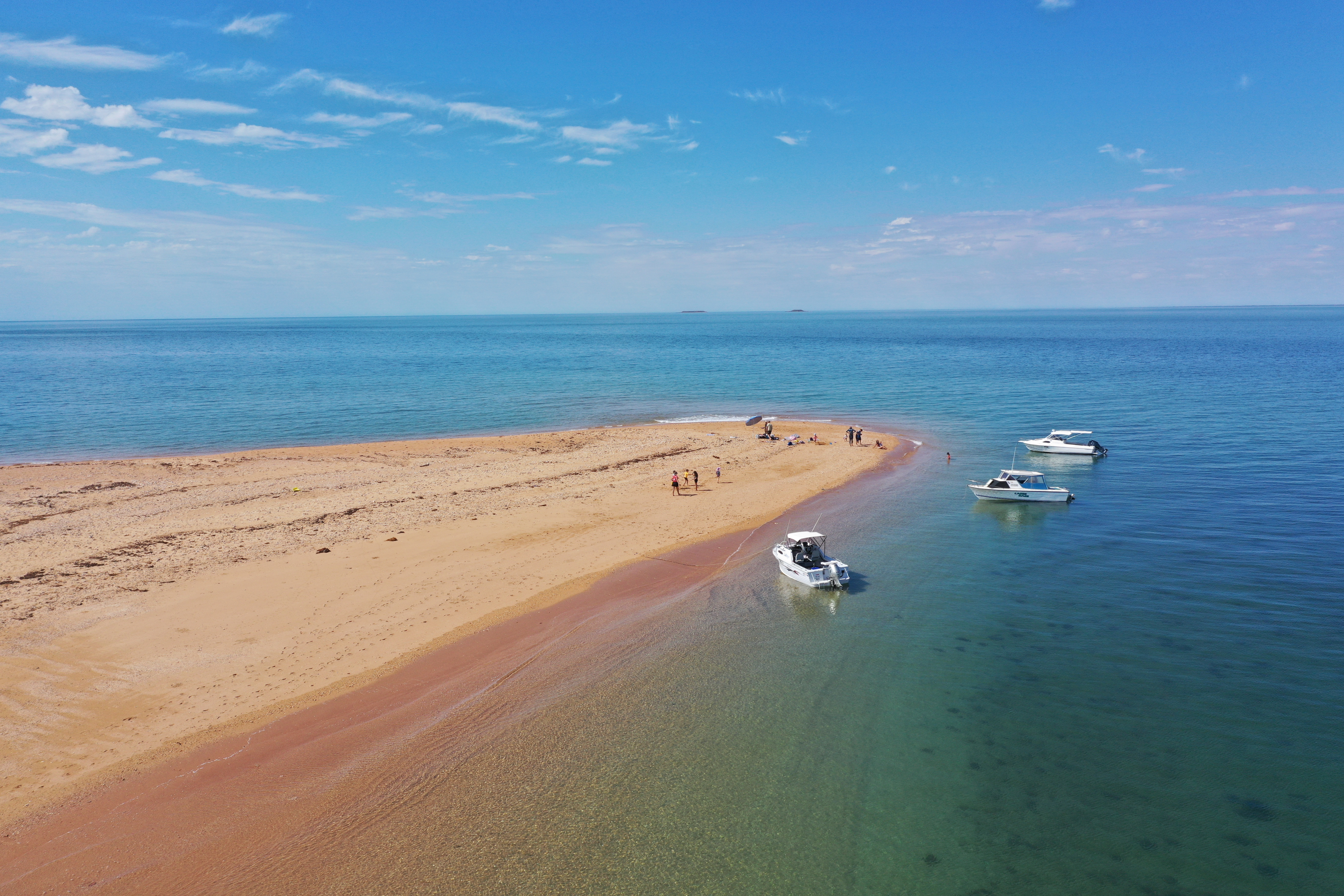
- Direction Island in August 2021

- Location within Western Australia

Geography
- Location: Indian Ocean
- Coordinates: 21°32′06″S 115°07′42″E

Administration
- Australia
- State: Western Australia
- LGA: Shire of Ashburton

Direction Island is located approximately 10 kilometres (6 miles) off the coast of Onslow in the Pilbara region of Western Australia.

== Description ==
Direction Island is the second largest of a group of ten islands and atolls unofficially called the Mackerel Islands. Two of the islands, Thevenard Island and Direction Island, have accommodation for tourists. It is one of the few places in the world where people can rent their own island for a holiday or vacation stay. Direction Island can be reached by a ferry service operating from the mainland at Onslow or by recreational boats. For vessels under 6 metres (20 foot) in length, there is a private boat mooring at the island.

Direction Island is approximately 1 kilometre (0.6 mi) in length and is surrounded by a coral reef. Areas of deep sandy soil are found on the island supporting Acacia and Triodia shrubland and coastal heath scrub.

Tourism facilities at Direction Island include a single self-contained beach shack which is built in an A-frame cabin style and is the only man-made structure on the island. The shack is solar powered with a backup generator and has a fresh water supply. Available activities include fishing, diving and snorkelling.

== Fauna ==
Direction Island is a breeding and resting place for sea turtles, waders and seabirds.

Marine life in the waters and reefs surrounding the island is extremely diverse and includes dolphins, whales, dugongs, stingrays, reef sharks, wobbegongs, crabs, crayfish, squid, octopus, starfish, sea snakes, moray eels, nudibranchs, groper and colourful tropical fish and coral reef fish including fusiliers, lionfish, cardinalfish, batfish and butterfly fish.

Over 70 species of reef fish, pelagic fish and school fish live in the island's waters. Species include spanish mackerel, billfish, sailfish, marlin, wahoo, cobia, golden trevally, giant trevally, queenfish, north west snapper, rankin cod, long tom, coral trout, red emperor, spangled emperor, crimson sea perch, pearl perch, silver drummer and yellowfin tuna.

Hard corals, soft corals, gorgonians, sponges and black coral trees are also found.

== History ==
In 1964, Onslow local residents Ian Blair and Adrian Day were granted a lease on Thevenard Island and Direction Island by the Government of Western Australia. In 1973, a group of local farmers purchased the business. From there, the accommodation and facilities on the islands developed from beach shacks used by fishermen to a fully-fledged tourism operation. In 1982 the cabin on Direction Island was extended to provide for tourist accommodation, and has since been refurbished. The same group of farmers developed the Onslow Mackerel Motel on the mainland in 1997 in an effort to provide a gateway to the Mackerel Islands.

== See also ==
- Thevenard Island
