= Camp Island (Western Australia) =

Island in Western Australia

Coordinates: 24°41′42″S 115°19′14″E

Camp Island is located in the Lyons River, a tributary of the Gascoyne River in the Gascoyne region of Western Australia.
