= Freycinet Island =

Island in Western Australia

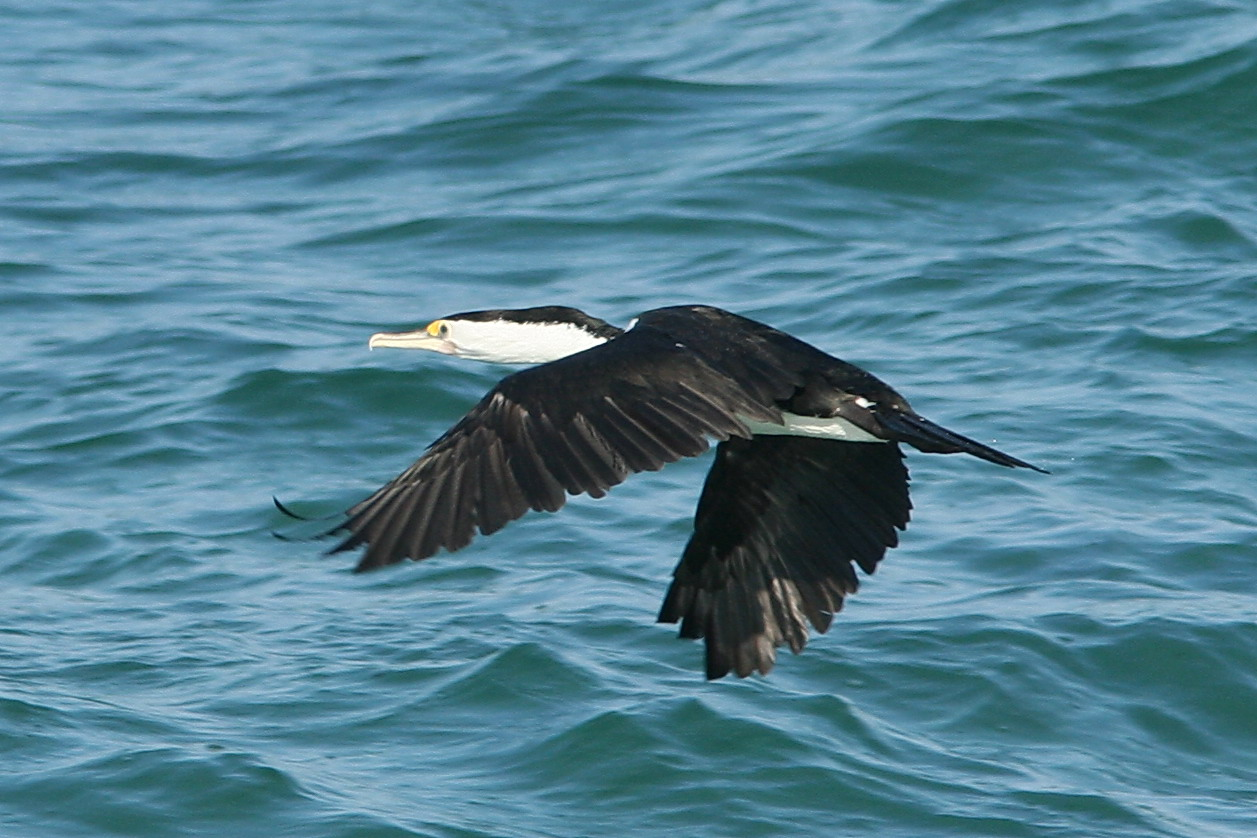
- The island holds an important nesting colony of pied cormorants

- Location within Western Australia

Geography
- Location: Indian Ocean
- Coordinates: 26.4064°S 113.6186°E
- Area: 0.030 km^{2} (0.012 sq mi)

Administration
- Australia
- State: Western Australia

Freycinet Island is a small island (3 hectares or 7 acres) in Henri Freycinet Harbour, lying off the Carrarang peninsula in the southern part of Shark Bay, on the-west coast of Western Australia. It is an elevated limestone plateau with scree slopes, vegetated with nitre bush shrubland.

== Birds ==
Freycinet Island is one component of the Quoin Bluff and Freycinet Island Important Bird Area (IBA), identified as such by BirdLife International because it holds an important nesting colony of pied cormorants. Together with a similar colony on Quoin Bluff some 80 kilometres (50 mi) to the north-west, it supports between 5,000 and 10,000 birds – over one per cent of the world population of the species. Small numbers of wedge-tailed shearwaters and silver gulls also nest on the island, and rock parrots have been recorded there.

== See also ==
- List of islands in Shark Bay
