= Gregory Island (Kimberley coast) =

Island in Western Australia

Gregory Island (16°18′59″S 123°18′31″E) is located off the Kimberley coast of Western Australia.
