= Henri Freycinet Harbour =

Bay in Western Australia

Coordinates: 26°20′S 113°40′E

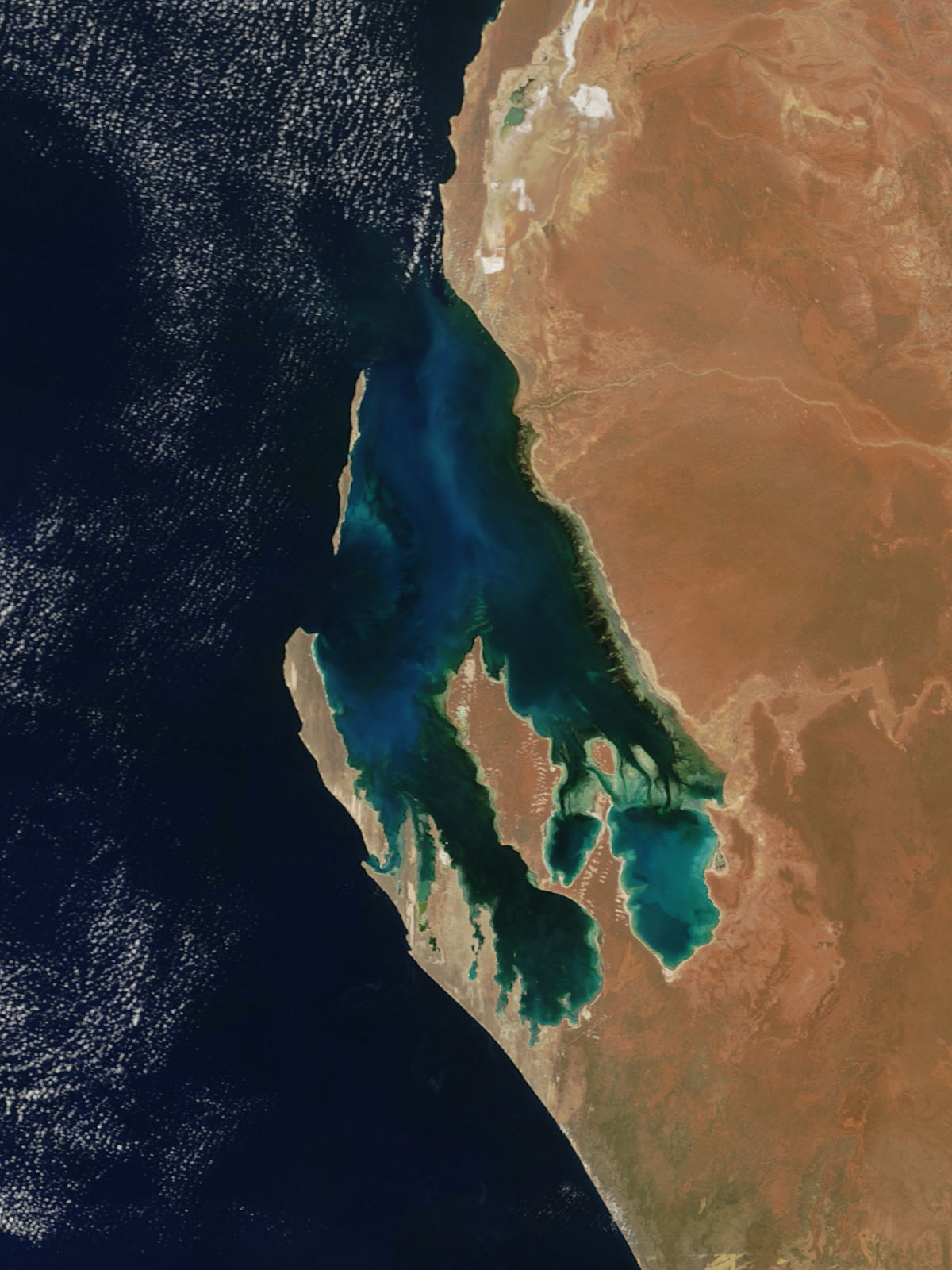
Satellite image of Shark Bay. Freycinet Harbour is southwest of the Peron Peninsula in the centre.

Henri Freycinet Harbour (French: [ɑ̃ʁi fʁɛsinɛ]), also known as Freycinet Estuary, is one of the inner gulfs of the Shark Bay World Heritage Site in Western Australia. It lies to the southwest of the Peron Peninsula. It has a significantly larger number of islands than Hamelin Pool, and has a number of smaller peninsulas known as prongs on its northern area.

It was named in 1801 by Louis Claude de Saulces de Freycinet after his older brother and fellow naval officer Louis Henri de Saulces de Freycinet (1777–1840). Both were on the Baudin expedition to Australia; Louis Henri went on to serve as Major General of the French Navy from 1832 to 1834.

Situated within the Shark Bay Marine Park, it has been identified as a critical dugong habitat area. Nevertheless the estuary has been dredged as part of works related to the Shark Bay Salt Joint Venture.

== Islands ==
- Baudin Island
- Charles Island
- Freycinet Island
- Lefebre Island
- Salutation Island
