= Direction Island (Kimberley coast) =

Island in Western Australia

- Location within Western Australia

Geography
- Location: Kimberley, Western Australia
- Coordinates: 16°25′40″S 123°08′56″E

Administration
- Australia
- State: Western Australia

Direction Island (16°25′40″S 123°08′56″E) is located off the Kimberley coast of Western Australia.
