= Lamarck Island, Western Australia =

Island in Western Australia

Lamarck Island (14°47′03″S 125°01′30″E) is located off the Kimberley coast of Western Australia.

== History ==
On 26 June 1913, three men were reportedly killed by the Benbah people on Lamarck Island. Eric and John McGuire and Thomas Newton were said to have landed on the island with two prisoners, Colin and Bert, and were met by women of the native tribe. The McGuires and Newton interfered with the women, drawing the ire of the native men. A skirmish broke out, resulting in the death of woman named Coolawich. Colin and Bert fled the island on the dinghy their group had arrived on and the McGuires and Newton were subsequently killed. The SS Penguin under the command of Captain Steele undertook an investigation into these events between July and August 1914.
