= Gould Island (Western Australia) =

Island in Western Australia

Gould Island (33°57′56″S 122°51′25″E) is located off the Great Southern region of Western Australia.
