= Alexander Island (Fitzroy River) =

Island in Western Australia

Coordinates: 18°23′56″S 125°21′57″E

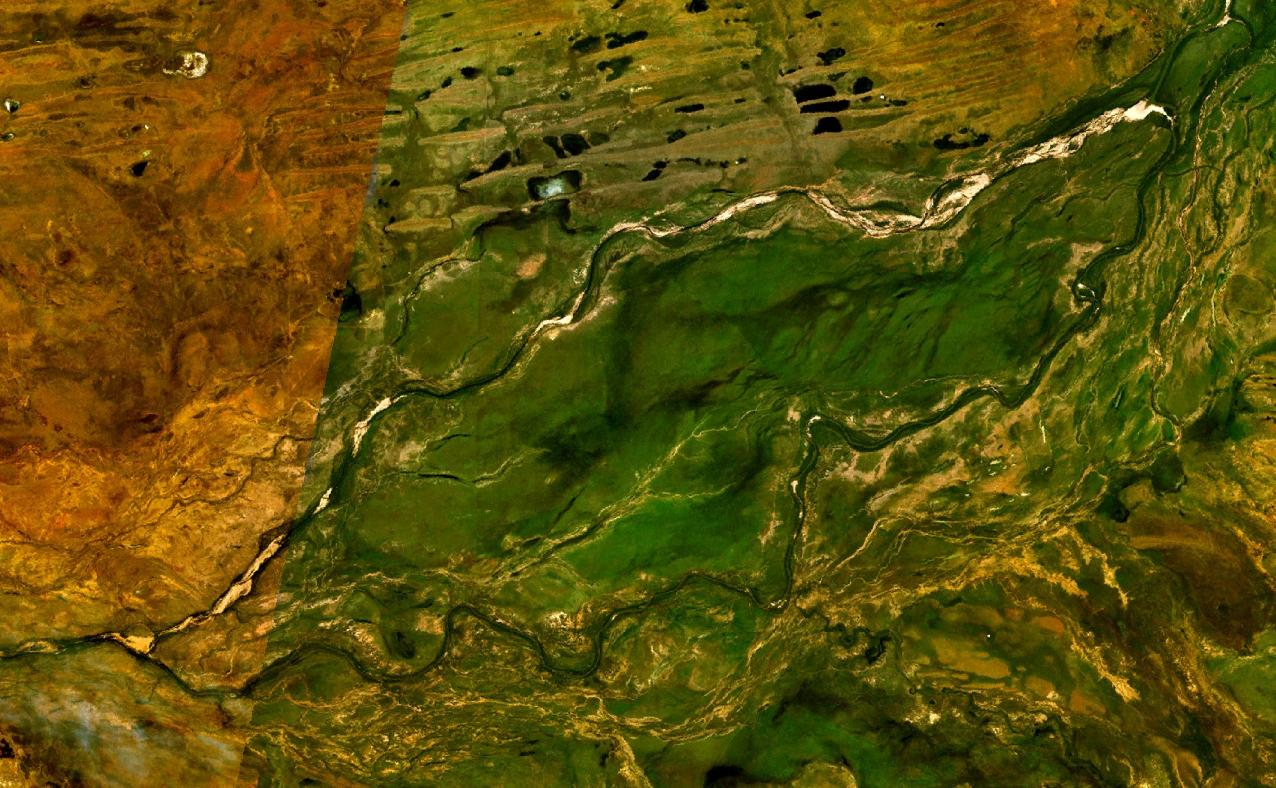
Alexander Island from space

Alexander Island in the Kimberley region of Western Australia is the area of land between the two arms of the Fitzroy River from where the river splits, about 10 kilometres south of Fitzroy Crossing, to where the arms merge about 80 kilometres south-west of Fitzroy Crossing.
