= Alexander Island (Collie River) =

Island in the Collie River, in Western Australia

Alexander Island is a 5.4 hectare island in the Collie River, Western Australia. It is located at 33°18′44″S 115°42′3″E, a few hundred metres east of the Collie Bridge in Australind, a suburb of Greater Bunbury.

The island was part of a 120 hectare land grant made to George Leake in 1839. Because it was located in the middle of the river, it was left in a relatively undisturbed state. In 2005, it was recognised as an important wildlife habitat, and purchased by the Government of Western Australia for $110,000. It is now reserved as open space under the Greater Bunbury Region Scheme.
