= Sunday Island (Shark Bay) =

Island in Shark Bay, Western Australia

- Location within Western Australia

Geography
- Location: Indian Ocean
- Coordinates: 26.124295°S 113.236538°E
- Length: 80.2 m (263.1 ft)
- Width: 33 m (108 ft)

Administration
- Australia
- Territory: Western Australia

Demographics
- Population: Uninhabited

Sunday Island is located in the Indian Ocean 530 ft (161.5 m) southeast of Dirk Hartog Island and 23 miles (37 km) southwest of Denham in Western Australia at -26.124295 south latitude and 113.236538 east longitude. It measures approximately 263 ft (80.2 m) by 108 ft (33 m). In the 19th century, it was a source of guano for British traders. It is now part of the Shark Bay World Heritage Site.
