= List of islands of Western Australia =

For lists of islands of Western Australia, please see:

- List of islands of Western Australia, 0–9, A–C
- List of islands of Western Australia, D–G
- List of islands of Western Australia, H–L
- List of islands of Western Australia, M–Q
- List of islands of Western Australia, R–T
- List of islands of Western Australia, U–Z
- Sortable list of islands of Western Australia

== See also ==
- Coastal regions of Western Australia
- List of islands of Australia
- Islands of Lake Argyle
- Islands of Perth, Western Australia
