= List of things named after Isaac Newton =

This is a list of things named after Sir Isaac Newton.

== Science and mathematics ==
- Newtonianism, the philosophical principle of applying Newton's methods in a variety of fields

=== Mathematics ===
- Gauss–Newton algorithm
- Newton–Cotes formulas
- Newton–Gauss line
- Newton–Leibniz axiom
- Newton–Okounkov body
- Newton–Pepys problem
- Newton–Puiseux theorem
- Newton fractal
- Newton's identities also known as Girard-Newton
- Newton's inequalities
- Newton's method also known as Newton–Raphson
- Newton's method in optimization
- Newton's notation
- Newton number, another name for Kissing number
- Newton polygon
- Newton polynomial
- Newton polytope
- Newton series (finite differences) also known as Newton interpolation, see Newton polynomial
- Newton's theorem about ovals
- Truncated Newton method

=== Physics ===
- Newton's bucket, see bucket argument
- Newton's cannonball
- Newton's constant, see universal gravitational constant
- Newton's cradle
- Newton disc
- Newton–Cartan theory
- Newton–Euler equations
- Newton's law of cooling
- Newton's laws of motion
- Newton's law of universal gravitation
- Newton–Laplace equation
- Newton's metal
- Newton's minimal resistance problem
- Newton's reflector, see also Newtonian telescope – a different design
- Newton's reflecting quadrant
- Newton number, another name for Power number
- Newton's rings
- Newton's rotating sphere argument, see rotating spheres
- Newton scale
- Newton's sphere theorem, see shell theorem
- Newton's theorem of revolving orbits
- Schrödinger–Newton equations
- Newton (unit), the International System of Units (SI) derived unit of force.
- Newton's approximation for impact depth
- Newtonian cosmology
- Newtonian dynamics
- Newtonian fluid, a fluid that flows like water—its shear stress is linearly proportional to the velocity gradient in the direction perpendicular to the plane of shear
  - Non-Newtonian fluids, in which the viscosity changes with the applied shear force
- Newtonian mechanics, also known as classical mechanics
- Newtonian potential
- Newtonian telescope, a type of reflecting telescope
- Post-Newtonian expansion

== Places ==
- Newton Township, Miami County, Ohio, United States
- Newtontoppen, the highest mountain in Svalbard
- Newton Island (Antarctica), near Lagrange Island, Descartes Island (Antarctica), Laplace Island (Antarctica), Pascal Island and Monge Island
- 8000 Isaac Newton, a minor planet
- Newton (Martian crater)
- Newton (lunar crater), an impact crater

== Schools ==
- Isaac Newton Institute
- Statal Institute of Higher Education Isaac Newton
- Sir Isaac Newton Sixth Form, a specialist maths and science school

== Artwork ==
- Newton, 1795 (reworked in 1805) painting by William Blake about Isaac Newton
- Newton, 1995 sculpture by Eduardo Paolozzi inspired by Blake's painting
- Isaac Newton Gargoyle, 1989 hammered copper sheet depiction of Newton on the exterior of Willamette Hall, University of Oregon

== Other ==
- Isaac Newton Group of Telescopes, three optical telescopes on the Canary Islands
  - Isaac Newton Telescope
- Newton Gateway to Mathematics
- Newton (platform), a 1990s personal digital assistant by Apple Inc
- Institute of Physics Isaac Newton Medal, an annual award
- XMM-Newton

== See also ==
- Newtonian (disambiguation)
