= Isaac Newton (disambiguation) =

Isaac Newton (1642–1726) was an English mathematician and physicist.

Isaac Newton may also refer to:

== Places ==
- 8000 Isaac Newton, a main-belt asteroid
- Isaac Newton University Lodge, a masonic temple in Cambridge, England
- Isaac Newton Institute for Mathematical Sciences at the University of Cambridge
- Sir Isaac Newton Sixth Form, a specialist college in Norwich, England
- Statal Institute of Higher Education Isaac Newton, a secondary school in Varese, Italy
- Isaac Newton Group of Telescopes, Spain
  - Isaac Newton Telescope

== Other uses ==
- Isaac Newton (agriculturalist) (1800–1867), a U.S. agriculturalist
- Isaac Newton Gargoyle, University of Oregon, Eugene, Oregon, USA; a sculpture, a gargoyle of Isaac Newton
- Institute of Physics Isaac Newton Medal, an annual award presented by the Institute of Physics
- Isaac Newton Jr., First Assistant Engineer of the USS Monitor

== See also ==
- List of things named after Isaac Newton
- Isaac Newton in popular culture
- Newton (disambiguation)
- Isaac (disambiguation)
