= Isaac Newton in popular culture =

Cultural depictions of Isaac Newton

Isaac Newton was an English mathematician, natural philosopher, theologian, alchemist and one of the most influential scientists in human history. His Philosophiae Naturalis Principia Mathematica is considered to be one of the most influential books in the history of science, laying the groundwork for most of classical mechanics by describing universal gravitation and the three laws of motion. In mathematics, Newton shares the credit with Gottfried Leibniz for the development of the differential and integral calculus.

Because of the resounding impact of his work, Newton became a science icon, as did Albert Einstein after publishing his theory of relativity more than 200 years later. Many books, plays, and films focus on Newton or use Newton as a literary device. Newton's stature among scientists remains at the very top rank, as demonstrated by a 2005 dual survey of scientists in Britain's Royal Society (formerly headed by Newton) and the general public asking who had the greater effect on the history of science and on the history of humanity, Newton or Einstein, Newton was deemed the more influential for both questions by both the public and scientists. In 1999, leading physicists voted Albert Einstein "greatest physicist ever"; Newton was the runner-up. A parallel survey of rank-and-file physicists gave the top spot to Newton.

== Visual arts ==
- William Blake created a colour copper engraving entitled Newton, in 1795. The engraving would serve as the basis for bronze statue Newton, made in 1995 by the sculptor Eduardo Paolozzi.
- French architect Étienne-Louis Boullée designed an unbuilt monumental Cénotaphe à Newton (1784), which he intended as an unadorned 500ft tall sphere encompassed by trees. Points of light would penetrate through the sphere in such a way as to replicate positions of the stars and planets in the night sky.
- The original logo of Apple Inc., designed by Ronald Wayne in 1976, depicted Newton sitting beneath an apple tree.

== Poetry ==
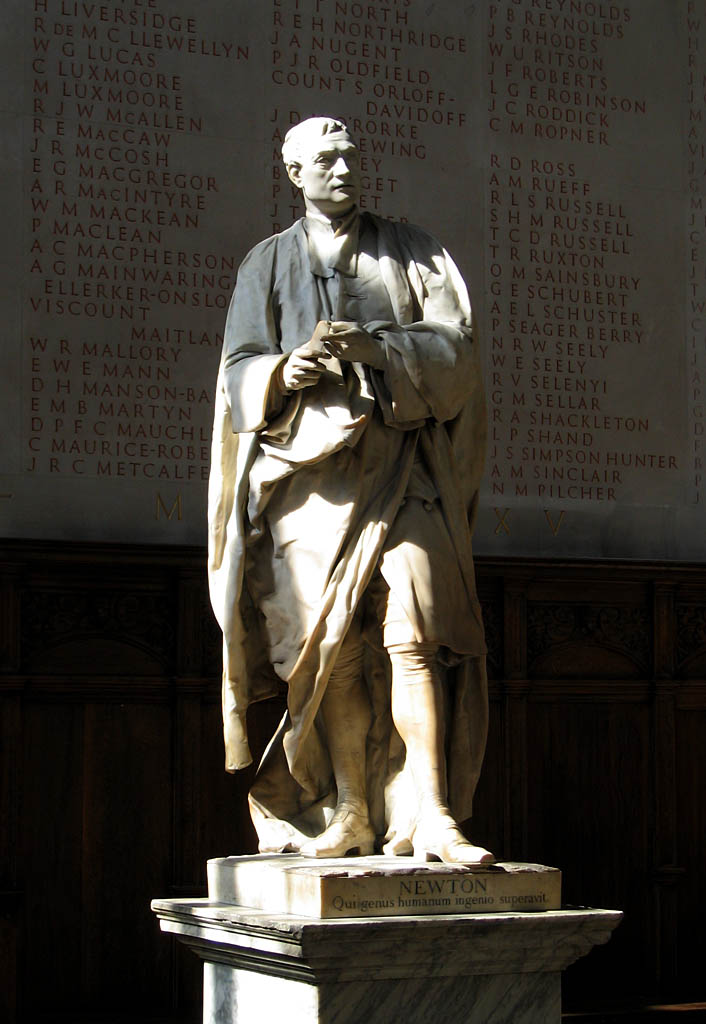
The statue of Newton, located in the chapel of Trinity College, Cambridge

English poet Alexander Pope was moved by Newton's accomplishments to write the famous epitaph:

Nature and nature's laws lay hid in night;
God said "Let Newton be" and all was light.

English poet J. C. Squire satirised this:

It could not last; the Devil shouting "Ho!
Let Einstein be!" restored the status quo.

The following passage is from William Wordsworth's The Prelude, in which he describes a marble statue of Newton at Trinity College, Cambridge:

And from my pillow, looking forth by light
Of moon or favouring stars, I could behold
The antechapel where the statue stood
Of Newton with his prism and silent face,
The marble index of a mind for ever
Voyaging through strange seas of Thought, alone.

- Jerusalem: The Emanation of the Giant Albion, William Blake
- A Poem Sacred to the Memory of Sir Isaac Newton, James Thomson
- The Movement of Bodies, Sheenagh Pugh

== Literature ==
=== Books about Newton ===
- Maureen McNeil (2007). "Newton as a national hero". Feminist Cultural Studies of Science and Technology. Routledge. pp. 27–43. ISBN 978-0-415-44537-5.
- A. Bowdoin Van Ripper (2002). Science in Popular Culture. Greenwood Press. ISBN 978-0-313-31822-1.
- Mordechai Feingold (2004). The Newtonian Moment: Isaac Newton and the Making of Modern Culture. Oxford University Press. ISBN 978-0-19-517734-3.

=== Books featuring Newton as a character ===
- Newton and his alchemical experiments play a central role in the 2012 young adult novels The Prince of Soul and The Lighthouse by Fredrik Brounéus.
- Isaac Newton plays a significant role in The Age of Unreason, a series of four alternate history novels written by American science fiction and fantasy author Gregory Keyes.
- Newton is an important character in The Baroque Cycle by Neal Stephenson. A major theme of these novels is the emergence of modern science, with Newton's work in the Principia being prominent. Newton's interest in alchemy and the dispute over the discovery of calculus are prominent plot points, and there is a (fictional) debate on metaphysics between Newton and Gottfried Leibniz moderated by Caroline of Ansbach. The development of an economy based on money and credit is also a major theme, with Newton's time with the Royal Mint and intrigues against counterfeit leading to a Trial of the Pyx.
- Newton is a recurring character in Gotlib's Rubrique-à-Brac series of comics, where he repeatedly discovers gravity or randomly bizarre laws after being (often very heavily) hit on the head by various objects, including the famous apple.
- Newton is the protagonist of the 2002 Philip Kerr novel Dark Matter, set during the Great Recoinage.
- Newton is a major character in Michael White's 2006 novel Equinox.
- 'Sir Isaac Newton' is a newt in The Tale of Mr. Jeremy Fisher by Beatrix Potter.
- The 2017 novel A Dragon's Guide to Making Your Human Smarter by Laurence Yep features Newton as a character, having lived to the present day due to finding the Philosopher's Stone. He is a teacher at the Spriggs Academy for ordinary humans and magical beings, and continues to create innovations such as a wormhole generator. Newton also displays a wry sense of humor, using his invention to prank Charles II, supposedly on the grounds of refusing to knight him.
- Newton is a significant historical character in Marvel's 616 universe, first as an inductee and subsequent member of the Brotherhood of the Shield, then as the sorcerer supreme of his era. He is shown to be super-intelligent and inventive and often plays a villainous role.

=== Books featuring Newton as a plot element ===
- Newton's alleged participation in the Priory of Sion; Newton's grave in Westminster Abbey provides the crucial clue in the mystery thriller The Da Vinci Code.
- Newton is credited as having invented the pet door (cat flap) as a monumental life achievement in Douglas Adams’s Dirk Gently's Holistic Detective Agency (1987).
- "Ghostwalk" is a story mainly about the mystery between Newton and Ezekiel Foxcroft's crime.
- In Ben Aaronovitch's Peter Grant series of novels, Newton formalised the system and practice of magic in the United Kingdom in a process referred to as "The Newtonian Synthesis". Newton was also a founder of The Folly, the United Kingdom's state magical institution.

== Plays ==
- Arcadia, Tom Stoppard, includes long discussions of topics of mathematical interest including: Fermat's Last Theorem and Newtonian determinism
- Five Fugues For Isaac Newton, Rae Davis
- Calculus, Carl Djerassi
- Small Infinities, Alan Brody, MIT
- Character in the play In Good King Charles's Glorious Days - by George Bernard Shaw
- The Physicists, a satiric drama by Friedrich Dürrenmatt
- Let Newton Be!, a verbatim play constructed from the published and unpublished words of Newton and his immediate contemporaries by Craig Baxter

== TV and radio ==
- In 1982, Dan Kern played Newton in an episode of Voyagers!, "Cleo and the Babe".
- From 1983 until 1998, Newton's Apple ran on PBS and was based around answering science questions for children.
- Trevor Howard appeared as Newton in the 1986 mini-series Peter the Great.
- In 1993, John Neville played Newton in an episode of Star Trek: The Next Generation, "Descent".
- In 1996, Newton was the main villain of the anime The Vision of Escaflowne as Emperor Dornkirk.
- In 1996 and 1997, Newton was played by Peter Dennis in the Star Trek: Voyager episodes "Death Wish" and "Darkling".
- In 2023, Newton appears in a cameo in the Doctor Who 2023 special Wild Blue Yonder, as played by mixed race actor Nathaniel Curtis.

== Audio drama ==
- In 2007, David Warner portrayed Newton in the licensed Big Finish Productions Doctor Who drama Circular Time. The Fourth Doctor had previously mentioned his acquaintance with Newton in the TV serials Shada and "The Five Doctors" (the same footage reused).
- In the Japanese television show, Kamen Rider Ghost, the ghost of Isaac Newton helps the main character Takeru Tenkuji/Kamen Rider Ghost to access his gravity-controlling Newton Damashii form. Newton's ghost also helps him on his journey to unite the 15 Heroic souls.

== Films and video ==
- Harpo Marx played Newton in a comic appearance in the film The Story of Mankind.
- Me & Isaac Newton, (1999) is a documentary, by Michael Apted, about seven scientists.
- "Weird Al" Yankovic portrayed Newton in a third-season episode of the web series Epic Rap Battles of History.
- Newton appears in the web series Super Science Friends where he is the hero of a teenage Albert Einstein.

== Video games ==
- In Mario's Time Machine, Isaac Newton appears in the game. Bowser steals the apple from the tree, and Mario returns it so it may fall and Newton can make his discoveries.
- Empire: Total War features Newton, to Britain in the Grand Campaign.
- In Bioshock Infinite, in the passive upgrade system, there is a gear called "Newton's Law". He is also referenced to in the DLC BioShock Infinite: Burial at Sea by Rosalind Lutece, and later by Andrew Ryan.
- In The Battle Cats, Newton appears as a Zero Legends boss and a unit in the game.

== Newtonmas ==
25 December is the birthday of one of the truly great men ever to walk the earth. His achievements might justly be celebrated wherever his truths hold sway. And that means from one end of the universe to the other. Happy Newton Day!

— Richard Dawkins, evolutionary biologist and prominent atheist

Some atheists, sceptics, and others have referred to 25 December as Newtonmas, a tongue-in-cheek reference to Christmas. Celebrants send cards with "Reason's Greetings!" printed inside, and exchange boxes of apples and science-related items as gifts. The celebration may have had its origin in a meeting of the Newton Association at Christmas 1890 to talk, distribute gifts, and share laughter and good cheer. The name Newtonmas can be attributed to The Skeptics Society, which needed an alternative name for its Christmas party. Another name for this holiday is Gravmas (also spelt Gravmass or Grav-mass) which is an abbreviation of "gravitational mass" due to Newton's Theory of Gravitation.

On 25 December 2014, American astrophysicist Neil deGrasse Tyson tweeted:

On this day long ago, a child was born who, by age 30, would transform the world. Happy Birthday Isaac Newton b. Dec. 25, 1642.

In a subsequent interview, Tyson denied being "anti-Christian", noting that Jesus' true birthdate is unknown.

Newton's birthday was 25 December under the Old Style Julian Calendar used in Protestant England at the time, but was 4 January under the New Style Gregorian Calendar used simultaneously in Catholic Europe. The period between has been proposed for a holiday season called "10 Days of Newton" to commemorate this.

== See also ==
- Category:Cultural depictions of scientists
- List of things named after Isaac Newton
