= Laplace Island =

Laplace Island may refer to:

- Laplace Island (Antarctica) 66°47′S 141°28′E
- Laplace Island (Western Australia) 14°11′26″S 125°39′28″E
