= Horowitz (disambiguation) =

Horowitz is a Yiddish surname.

Horowitz may also refer to:

- Horowitz family
- Hořovice, Bohemia (German: Horschowitz or Horowitz)
- Horowitz (crater), on Mars
- Horowitz index, used in medical diagnostics
