= Acacia dissimilis =

Mitchell Plateau wattle

Scientific classification
- Kingdom: Plantae
- Clade: Tracheophytes
- Clade: Angiosperms
- Clade: Eudicots
- Clade: Rosids
- Order: Fabales
- Family: Fabaceae
- Subfamily: Caesalpinioideae
- Clade: Mimosoid clade
- Genus: Acacia
- Species: A. dissimilis

Binomial name
- Acacia dissimilis M.W.McDonald

Synonyms
- Acacia dissimilis M.W.McDonald & Maslin nom. inval.; Racosperma dissimile (M.W.McDonald) Pedley

Species of legume

Acacia dissimilis, also known as the Mitchell Plateau wattle, is a species of flowering plant in the family Fabaceae and is endemic to a small area of northern Western Australia. It is an openly branched shrub with smooth, grey bark, dimidiate or slightly sickle-shaped, thinly leathery phyllodes, spikes of flowers and linear, crusty pods.

== Description ==
Acacia dissimilis is an openly branched shrub that typically grows to a height of up to 2.5 m (8 ft 2 in) and has smooth grey bark. Its new shoots are covered with long, soft, lemon yellow hairs. The branchlets are terete, slightly flattened near the outer ends, and can be sparsely or densely covered with soft, silvery hairs. The phyllodes are dimidiate or slightly sickle-shaped, 90–150 mm (3.5–5.9 in) long and 25–45 mm (0.98–1.77 in) wide with many parallel longitudinal veins, with three to seven more prominent than the others. There are stipules 4–5 mm (0.16–0.20 in) long at the base of the phyllodes. The flowers have not been seen, apart from two spikes 80 mm (3.1 in) long on densely hairy peduncles 8–10 mm (0.31–0.39 in) long. The pods are linear, crusty, 2–7 mm (0.079–0.276 in) wide, slightly constricted between the seeds, wrinkled and sparsely covered with soft hairs. The seeds are elliptic to egg-shaped, 3–4 mm (0.12–0.16 in) long and 2–3 mm (0.079–0.118 in) wide with a cream-coloured aril.

== Taxonomy ==
Acacia dissimilis was first formally described in 2003 by Maurice W. MacDonald in Australian Systematic Botany from specimens collected 11 km (6.8 mi) south-south-west of Mitchell Falls. The specific epithet (dissimilis) means 'unalike' or 'different', alluding to its unusual fruiting time from May to June.

== Distribution and habitat ==
Mitchell Plateau Wattle is native to an area in the Kimberley region of Western Australia where it is often found growing in disturbed lateritic soils. It is known in only two locations in the northern Kimberley the first being the Mitchell Plateau where it is found growing in lateritic soils and the other being on Laplace Island where it is found growing in basalt.

== See also ==
- List of Acacia species
