= Newtonian =

Newtonian refers to the work of Isaac Newton, in particular:

- Newtonian mechanics, i.e. classical mechanics
- Newtonian telescope, a type of reflecting telescope
- Newtonian cosmology
- Newtonian dynamics
- Newtonianism, the philosophical principle of applying Newton's methods in a variety of fields
- Newtonian fluid, a fluid that flows like water—its shear stress is linearly proportional to the velocity gradient in the direction perpendicular to the plane of shear
  - Non-Newtonian fluids, in which the viscosity changes with the applied shear force

== Supplementary material ==
- List of things named after Isaac Newton
