= Orbital Mechanics for Engineering Students =

Aerospace engineering textbook

- Third edition
- Author: Howard D. Curtis
- Series: Elsevier Aerospace Engineering Series
- Subject: Orbital mechanics
- Published: 2010 (Butterworth-Heinemann)
- Pages: 792 (4th ed.)
- ISBN: 978-0-08-102133-0 (4th ed.)

Orbital Mechanics for Engineering Students is an aerospace engineering textbook by Howard D. Curtis, in its fourth edition as of 2019. The book provides an introduction to orbital mechanics, while assuming an undergraduate-level background in physics, rigid body dynamics, differential equations, and linear algebra.

Topics covered by the text include a review of kinematics and Newtonian dynamics, the two-body problem, Kepler's laws of planetary motion, orbit determination, orbital maneuvers, relative motion and rendezvous, and interplanetary trajectories. The text focuses primarily on orbital mechanics, but also includes material on rigid body dynamics, rocket vehicle dynamics, and attitude control. Control theory and spacecraft control systems are less thoroughly covered.

The textbook includes exercises at the end of each chapter, and supplemental material is available online, including MATLAB code for orbital mechanics projects.
