= Descartes Island (Antarctica) =

Island in Adélie Land, Antarctica

- Location within Antarctica

Geography
- Location: Antarctica
- Coordinates: 66°47′S 141°29′E

Administration
- Administered under the Antarctic Treaty System

Demographics
- Population: Uninhabited

Descartes Island is a rocky island 0.2 kilometres (0.1 nmi) long, midway between Lagrange Island and La Conchee and 1.7 kilometres (0.9 nmi) north-northeast of Cape Mousse. It was charted in 1951 by the French Antarctic Expedition and named after René Descartes, the French mathematician and philosopher.

== See also ==
- List of Antarctic and sub-Antarctic islands
