= Horowitz (crater) =

Crater on Mars

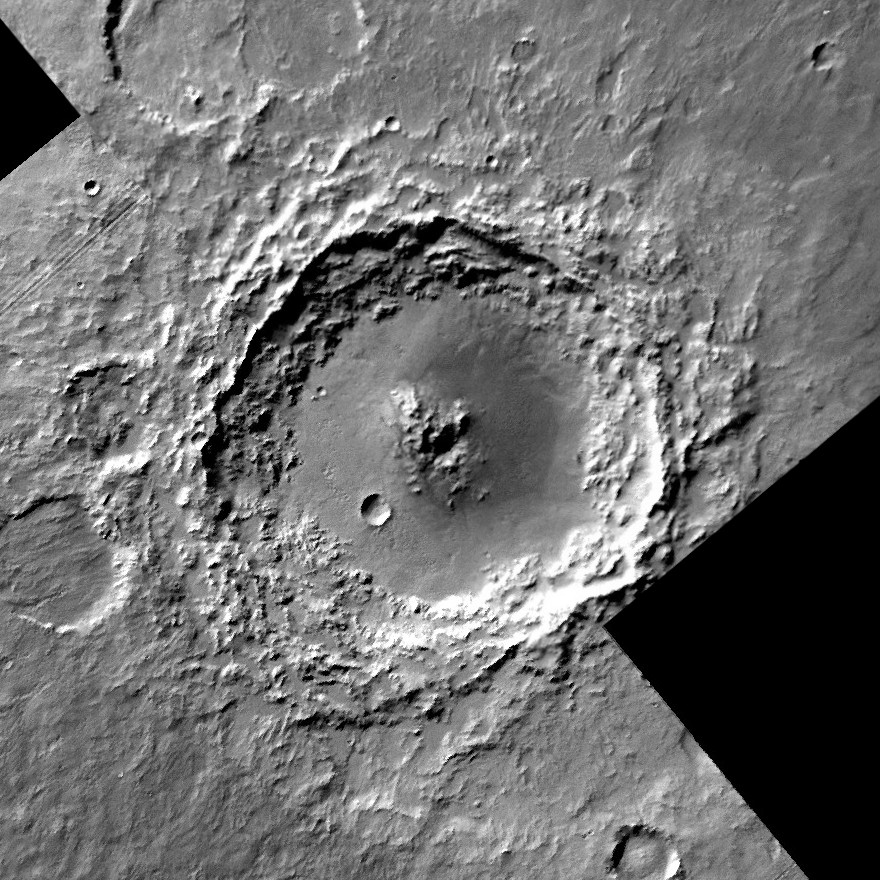
- Viking Orbiter 1 mosaic
- Planet: Mars
- Coordinates: 32.06°S 140.75°E
- Quadrangle: Eridania
- Diameter: 65 km (40 mi)
- Eponym: Norman H. Horowitz

Horowitz is a crater in the Terra Cimmeria region of the southern highlands of Mars. Cartographically, it is located within the Eridania quadrangle. Horowitz crater has a diameter of 65 km. Its name refers to the American geneticist Norman H. Horowitz.

== Geology ==
Poleward-facing gullies have been identified against the northern rim of Horowitz crater.

=== Recurring slope lineae ===
In 2011 it was announced that images captured by NASA's Mars Reconnaissance Orbiter have suggested the presence of possible flowing water during the warmest months on Mars, as shown in images taken of Newton and Horowitz craters among others.

== See also ==
- List of craters on Mars: H-N
