= Laplace Island (Antarctica) =

Island in Adélie Land, Antarctica

- Location within Antarctica

Geography
- Location: Antarctica
- Coordinates: 66°47′S 141°28′E

Administration
- Administered under the Antarctic Treaty System

Demographics
- Population: Uninhabited

Laplace Island is a small rocky island 0.6 kilometres (0.3 nmi) west-northwest of La Conchée and 1.4 kilometres (0.75 nmi) north of Cape Mousse, Antarctica. It was charted in 1951 by the French Antarctic Expedition and named by them for Pierre-Simon Laplace, the French astronomer and mathematician.

== See also ==
- List of Antarctic and sub-Antarctic islands
- Laplace Island (disambiguation)
