= Pascal Island (Antarctica) =

Island in Adélie Land, Antarctica

- Location within Antarctica

Geography
- Location: Antarctica
- Coordinates: 66°47′S 141°29′E

Administration
- Administered under the Antarctic Treaty System

Demographics
- Population: Uninhabited

Pascal Island in the Antarctic is a small rocky island 0.37 kilometres (0.2 nmi) east-southeast of Descartes Island and 1.9 kilometres (1 nmi) northeast of Cape Mousse. Charted in 1951 by the French Antarctic Expedition and named by them for Blaise Pascal (1623–1662), French physician and philosopher.

== See also ==
- List of Antarctic and sub-Antarctic islands
