= Newton Island (Antarctica) =

Island in Adélie Land, Antarctica

- Location within Antarctica

Geography
- Location: Antarctica
- Coordinates: 66°46′S 141°27′E

Administration
- Administered under the Antarctic Treaty System

Demographics
- Population: Uninhabited

Newton Island is a rocky island 0.9 kilometres (0.5 nmi) northwest of Laplace Island and 2 kilometres (1.2 nmi) north-northwest of Cape Mousse, Adélie Coast, Antarctica. It was charted in 1951 by the French Antarctic Expedition and named after Sir Isaac Newton, English philosopher and mathematician.

== See also ==
- List of Antarctic and sub-Antarctic islands
