= La Conchée =

Island in Adélie Land, Antarctica

- Location within Antarctica

Geography
- Location: Antarctica
- Coordinates: 66°47′S 141°29′E

Administration
- Administered under the Antarctic Treaty System

Demographics
- Population: Uninhabited

La Conchée is a rocky island 0.5 kilometres (0.25 nmi) long lying between Pascal Island and Monge Island, 1.3 kilometres (0.7 nmi) northeast of Cape Mousse, Adélie Coast, Antarctica. It was charted in 1950 by the French Antarctic Expedition and named after the Fort de la Conchée, one of the forts guarding the approaches to Saint-Malo, France.
