= Monge Island =

Island in Adélie Land, Antarctica

- Location within Antarctica

Geography
- Location: Antarctica
- Coordinates: 66°47′S 141°29′E

Administration
- Administered under the Antarctic Treaty System

Demographics
- Population: Uninhabited

Monge Island is a small rocky island off the coast of Antarctica, lying immediately south of La Conchée and 0.9 kilometres (0.5 nmi) northeast of Cape Mousse. It was charted in 1951 by the French Antarctic Expedition and named after French mathematician Gaspard Monge.

== See also ==
- List of Antarctic and sub-Antarctic islands
