= Lagrange Island =

Island in Adélie Land, Antarctica

- Location within Antarctica

Geography
- Location: Antarctica
- Coordinates: 66°46′S 141°28′E

Administration
- Administered under the Antarctic Treaty System

Demographics
- Population: Uninhabited

Lagrange Island is a small rocky island 0.7 kilometres (0.4 nmi) northeast of Newton Island and 3 kilometres (1.5 nmi) north of Cape Mousse, Adélie Coast, Antarctica. It was charted in 1951 by the French Antarctic Expedition and named after Joseph-Louis Lagrange, the French mathematician.

== See also ==
- List of Antarctic and sub-Antarctic islands
