= Seasonal flows on warm Martian slopes =

Surface features on Mars

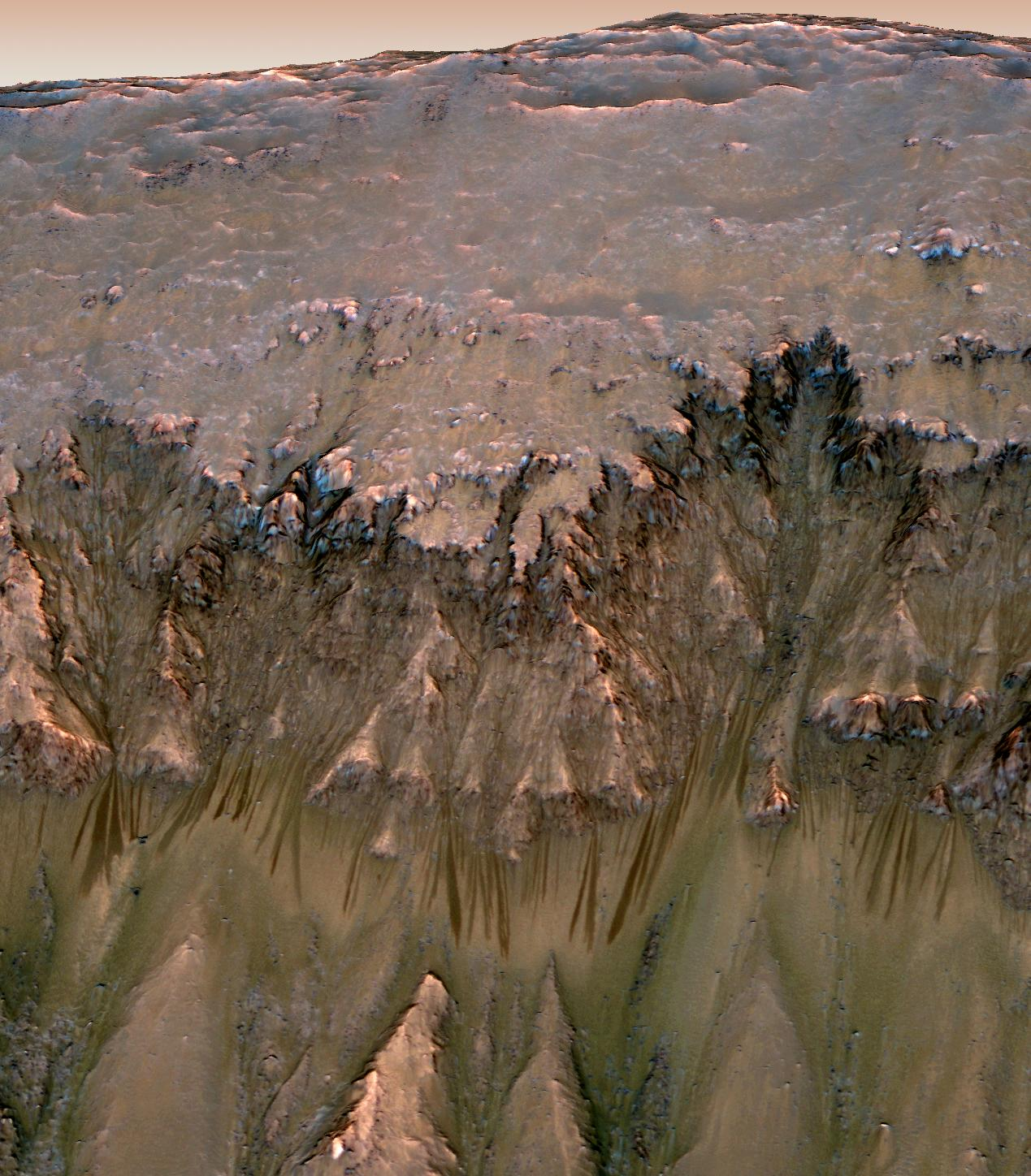
Reprojected view of warm-season flows in Newton Crater

Seasonal flows on warm Martian slopes (also called recurring slope lineae, recurrent slope lineae and RSL) are thought to be either salty water flows occurring during the warmest months on Mars, or dry grains that "flow" downslope of at least 27 degrees.

The flows are narrow (0.5 to 5 meters) and exhibit relatively dark markings on steep (25° to 40°) slopes, appear and incrementally grow during warm seasons and fade in cold seasons. Liquid brines near the surface have been proposed to explain this activity, or interactions between sulfates and chlorine salts that interact under to produce landslides.

== Overview ==
Research indicates that in the past there was liquid water flowing on the surface of Mars, creating large areas similar to Earth's oceans. However, the question remains as to where the water has gone.

The Mars Reconnaissance Orbiter (MRO) is a multipurpose spacecraft launched in 2005 designed to conduct reconnaissance and exploration of Mars from orbit. The spacecraft is managed by the Jet Propulsion Laboratory (JPL). The HiRISE camera onboard the MRO is at the forefront of the ongoing RSL studies as it helps chart the features with images of closely monitored sites typically taken every few weeks. The 2001 Mars Odyssey orbiter has been using spectrometers and a thermal imager for over 16 years to detect evidence of past or present water and ice. It has detected none at the RSL. On October 5, 2015, possible RSL were reported on Mount Sharp near the Curiosity rover.

== Features ==
Warm season flows on slope in Newton Crater (video-gif)

Distinctive properties of recurring slope lineae (RSL) include slow incremental growth, formation on warm slopes in warm seasons, and annual fading and recurrence, showing a strong correlation with solar heating. RSL extend down slope from bedrock outcrops often following small gullies about 0.5 to 5 meters (1 ft 8 in to 16 ft 5 in) wide, with lengths up to hundreds of meters, and some of the locations display more than 1,000 individual flows. RSL advance rates are highest at the beginning of each season, followed by much slower lengthening. RSL appear and lengthen in the late southern spring and summer from 48°S to 32°S latitudes that favor equator-facing slopes, which are times and places with peak surface temperatures from −23 °C to 27 °C. Active RSL also occur in equatorial regions (0–15°S), most commonly in the Valles Marineris troughs.

Researchers surveyed flow-marked slopes with the Mars Reconnaissance Orbiter's CRISM and although there is no spectrographic evidence for actual water, the instrument has directly imaged perchlorate salts thought to be dissolved in water brines in the subsurface. This may indicate the water quickly evaporates upon reaching the surface, leaving only the salts. The cause of the surface darkening and lightening is poorly understood: a flow initiated by salty water (brine) could rearrange grains or change surface roughness in a way that darkens the appearance, but the way the features brighten again when temperatures drop is harder to explain. However, in November 2018, it was announced that CRISM had fabricated some additional pixels representing the minerals alunite, kieserite, serpentine and perchlorate. The instrument team found that some false positives were caused by a filtering step when the detector switches from a high luminosity area to shadows. Reportedly, 0.05% of the pixels were indicating perchlorate, now known to be a false high estimate by this instrument. Reduced content of salts on the slopes reduces the chances of the presence of brines.

== Hypotheses ==
A number of different hypotheses for RSL formation have been proposed. The seasonality, latitude distribution, and brightness changes strongly indicate a volatile material—such as water or liquid CO_{2}—is involved. One hypothesis is that RSL could form by rapid heating of nocturnal frost in agreement with experimental results. Another one proposes flows of carbon dioxide, but the settings in which the flows occur are too warm for carbon-dioxide frost (CO_{2}), and at some sites is too cold for pure water. Other hypotheses include dry granular flows, but no entirely dry process can explain seasonal flows that progressively grow over weeks and months. Cornice avalanches is another hypothesis. The idea is that wind collects snow or frost just past the peak of a mountain and then this becomes an avalanche after it warms up. Seasonal melting of shallow ice would explain the RSL observations, but it would be difficult to replenish such ice annually. However, as of 2015, direct observations of seasonal deposition of soluble salts strongly suggest that RSL involve brine (hydrated salts).

=== Brines ===
The leading hypothesis involves the flow of brines (very salty water). Salt deposits over much of Mars indicate that brine was abundant in Mars's past. Salinity lowers the freezing point of water to sustain a liquid flow. Less saline water would freeze at the observed temperatures. Thermal infrared data from the Thermal Emission Imaging System (THEMIS) on board the 2001 Mars Odyssey orbiter, have allowed the temperature conditions under which RSL form to be constrained. While a small number of RSL are visible at temperatures above the freezing point of water, most are not, and many appear at temperatures as low as −43 °C (230 K). Some scientists think that under these cold conditions, a brine of iron(III) sulfate (Fe_{2}(SO_{4})_{3}) or calcium chloride (CaCl_{2}) is the most likely mode of RSL formation. Another team of scientists, using the CRISM instrument onboard MRO, reported that the evidence for hydrated salts is most consistent with the spectral absorption features of magnesium perchlorate (Mg(ClO_{4})_{2}), magnesium chloride (MgCl_{2}(H_{2}O)_{x}) and sodium perchlorate (NaClO_{4}).

Experiments and calculations demonstrated that recurring slope lineae could be produced by the deliquescence and rehydration of hydrous chlorides and oxychlorine salts. However, under present Martian atmospheric conditions there is not enough water to complete this process.

These observations are the closest scientists have come to finding evidence of liquid water on the planet's surface today. Frozen water, however, has been detected near the surface in many middle to high-latitude regions. Purported droplets of brine also appeared on struts of the Phoenix Mars Lander in 2008.

=== Source of water ===
Liquid brine flows near the surface might explain this activity, but the exact source of the water and the mechanism behind its motion are not understood. A hypothesis proposes that the needed water could originate in the seasonal oscillations of near-surface adsorbed water provided by the atmosphere; perchlorates and other salts known to be present on the surface are able to attract and hold water molecules from the surrounding environment (hygroscopic salts), but the dryness of the Martian air is a challenge. Water vapor must be efficiently trapped over very small areas, and seasonal variation in the atmospheric column abundance of water vapor does not match the RSL activity over active locations.

Deeper groundwater may exist and could reach the surface at springs or seeps, but this cannot explain the wide distribution of RSL, extending from the tops of ridges and peaks. Also, there are apparent RSL on equatorial dunes composed of permeable sand, unlikely to be a groundwater source.

An analysis of near-subsurface data from the Mars Odyssey neutron spectrometer revealed that the RSL sites do not contain any more water than found at anywhere else at similar latitudes. The authors concluded that RSL are not supplied by large, near-surface briny aquifers. It is still possible with this data that water vapor is from deeply buried ice, from the atmosphere, or from small deeply buried aquifers.

=== Dry sand flows ===
Dry granular flow was proposed since the first observations of RSLs but this interpretation was ruled out because of the seasonality of the process. The first proposition of a seasonal triggering in a dry context was published in March 2017 using a Knudsen pump effect. The authors demonstrated that the RSLs stopped at an angle of 28° in Garni crater, in agreement with dry granular avalanche. In addition, the authors pointed out several limitations of the wet hypothesis, such as the fact that the detection of water was only indirect (salt detection but not water). This theory pushed back the dry flow theory. Research published in November 2017 concludes that the observations are best explained by dry flow processes, and remark that there is no actual spectrographic evidence for water. Their research shows RSL exist only on slopes steeper than 27 degrees, enough for dry grains to descend the way they do on faces of active dunes. The RSL do not flow onto shallower than 27 degree slopes, which is inconsistent with models for water. A 2016 report also cast doubt on possible sources of underground water at RSL sites, but the new research article acknowledged that hydrated salts could draw some humidity from the atmosphere and seasonal changes in hydration of salt-containing grains might result in some trigger mechanism for RSL grainflows, such as expansion, contraction, or release of some water, that would change the cohesion of grains and cause them to fall or "flow" downslope. Furthermore, neutron spectrometer data by the Mars Odyssey orbiter obtained over one decade, was published in December 2017, and shows no evidence of water (hydrogenated regolith) at the active sites, so its authors also support the hypotheses of either short-lived atmospheric water vapour deliquescence, or dry granular flows. Nevertheless, the footprint of this instrument (~100 km) is much larger than the RSLs (~100m).

== Habitability and planetary protection ==
These features form on Sun-facing slopes at times of the year when the local temperatures reach above the melting point for ice. The streaks grow in spring, widen in late summer and then fade away in autumn. Since these features could involve water in some form, and even though this water could still be too cold or too salty for life, the corresponding areas are currently treated as potentially habitable. Hence they are categorized in planetary protection recommendations as "Uncertain Regions, to be treated as Special Regions" (i.e. a region on the Mars surface where Earth life could potentially survive).

While the wet flows hypothesis has lost some ground since 2015, these regions are still amongst the most favoured candidate sites to support Earth bacteria brought by contaminated landers. Some recurring slope lineae are in reach of the Curiosity rover but planetary protection rules have prevented close exploration by the rover. This has led to some debate about whether these rules should be loosened.

== Recurrent slope lineae near equator ==
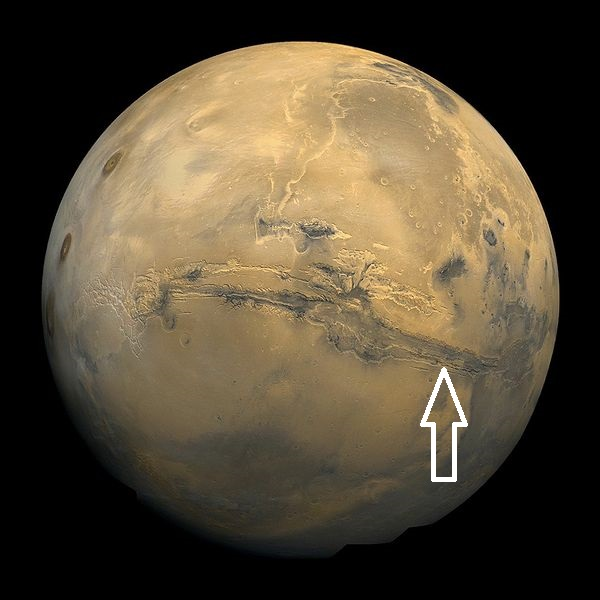
Image of disk of Mars taken by Viking. Arrow shows location of recurrent slope lineae in following HiRISE images.

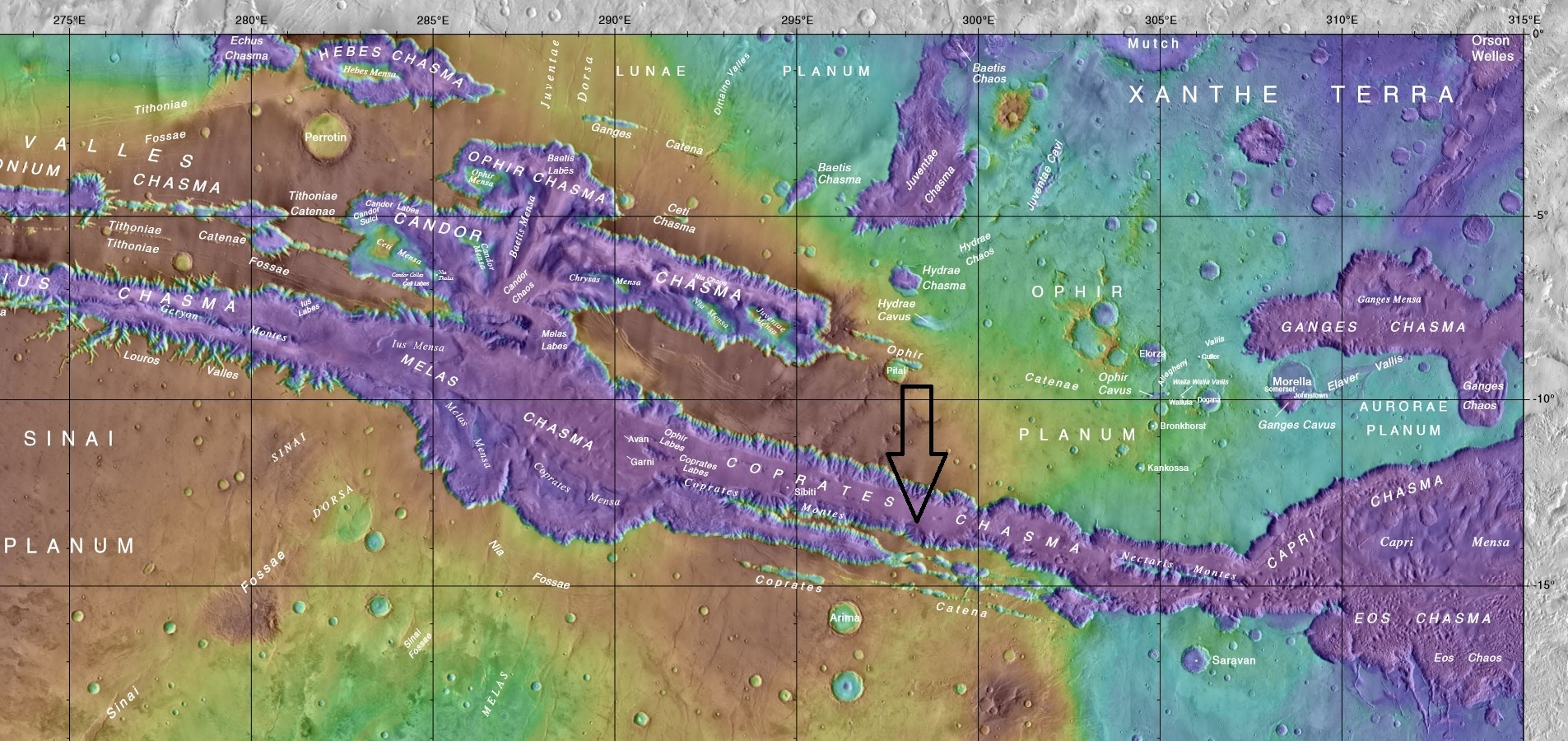
Labeled map of features near to Coprates Chasma. Arrow shows location of recurrent slope lineae in following HiRISE images.

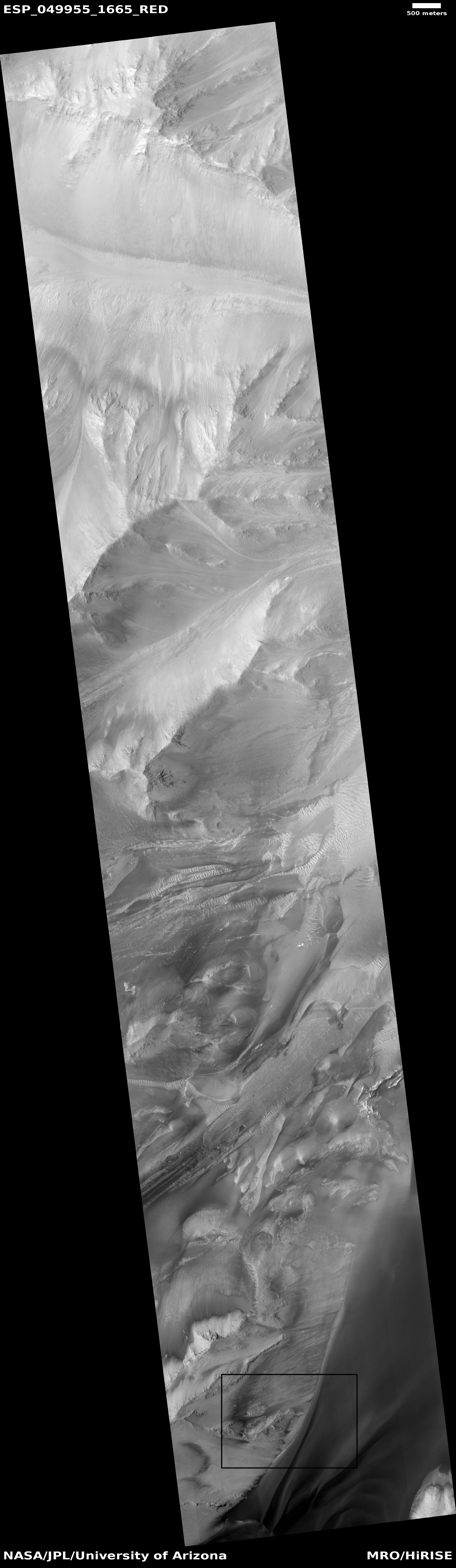
Wide view of part of Valles Marineris, as seen by HiRISE under HiWish program Box shows location of recurrent slope lineae that are enlarged in next image.

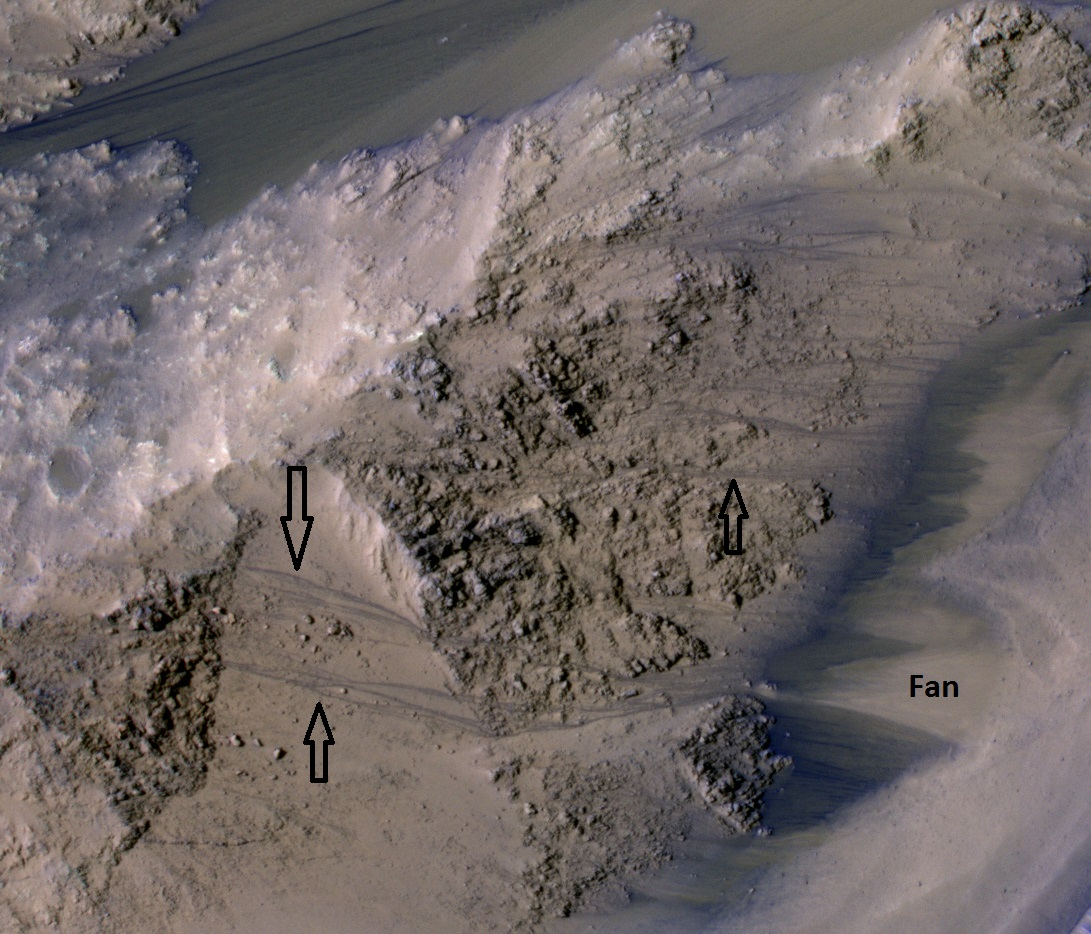
Close, color view of recurrent slope lineae, as seen by HiRISE under HiWish program Arrows point to some of the recurrent slope lineae. Fan may have been built up by past recurrent slope lineae.

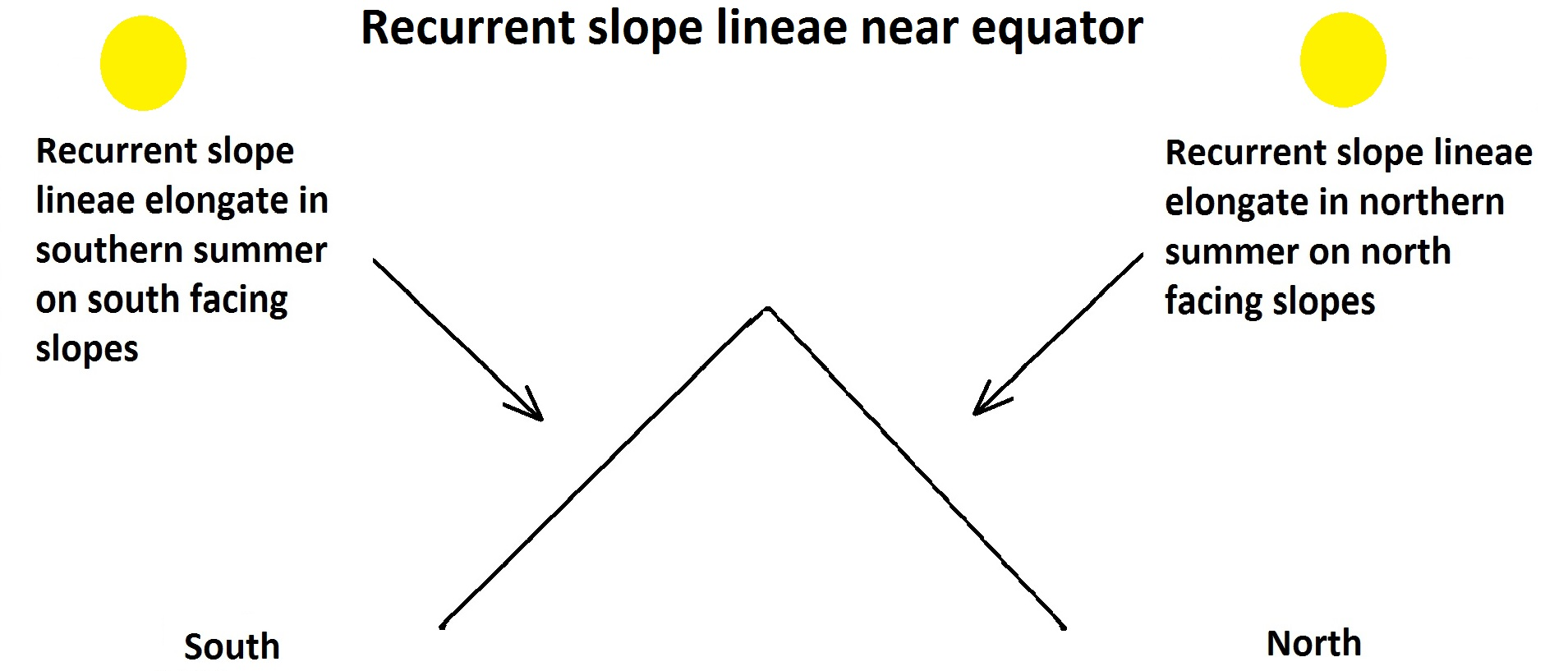
Recurrent slope lineae elongate when the slopes are at their warmest. Near the equator, RSL elongate on northern slopes in the northern summer and on the southern slopes in the southern summer.

== Gallery ==
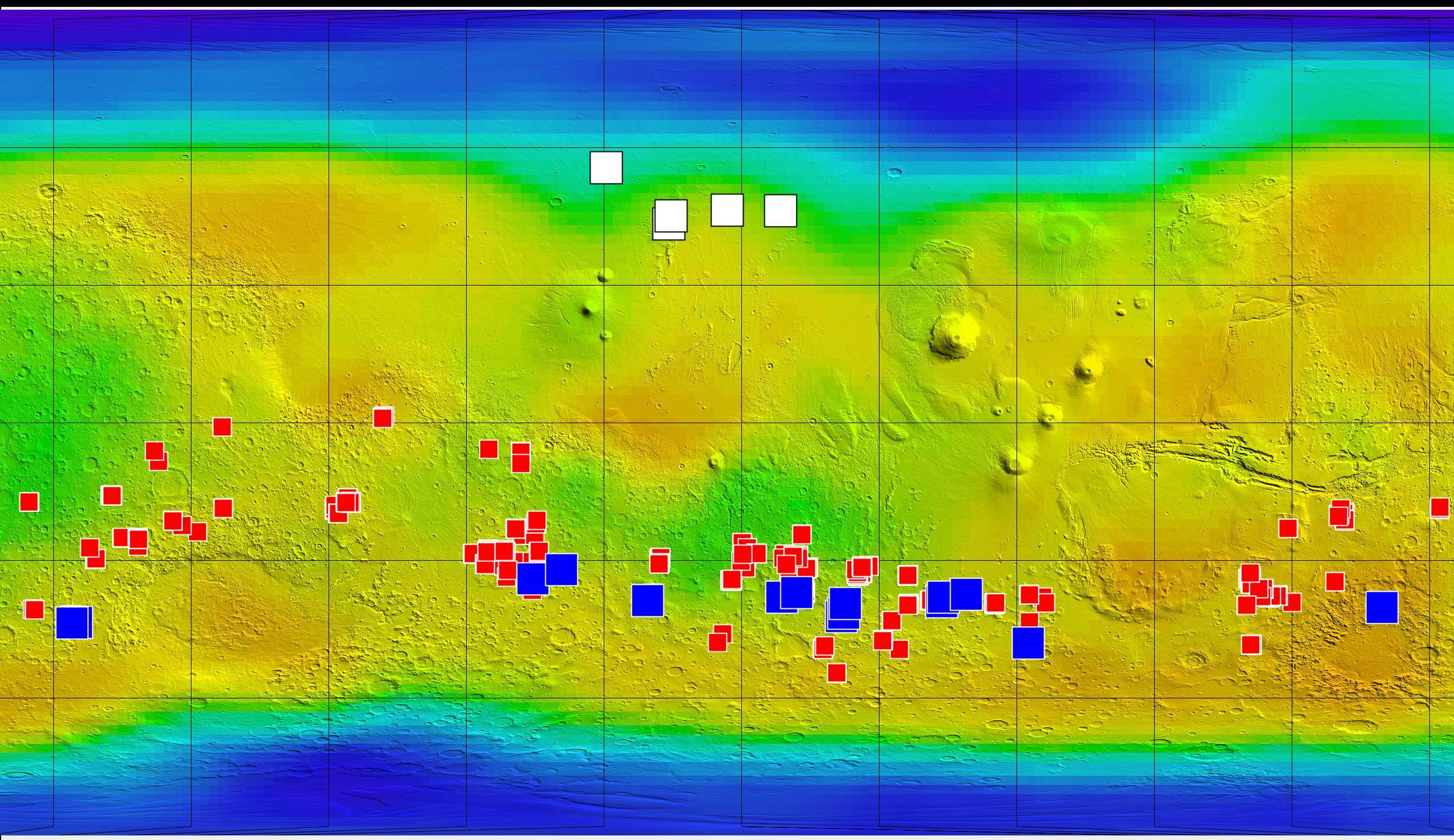
Ice (white), salt (red) and warm-season flows (blue) on Mars

Dark flows in Newton Crater extending during summer (video-gif).

Warm season flows on slope in Horowitz Crater (video-gif).

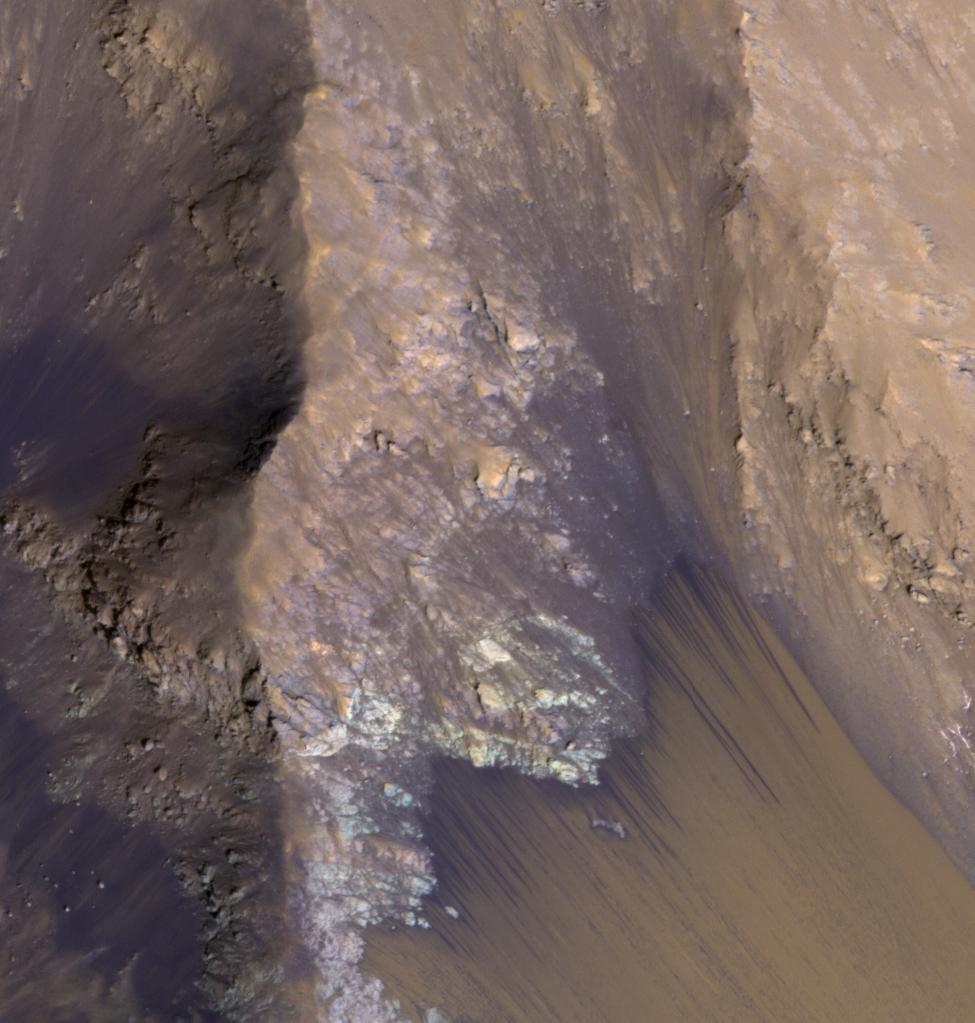
Seasonal flows on Coprates Chasma in Valles Marineris.

== See also ==
- Climate of Mars
- Evolution of water on Mars and Earth
- Geology of Mars
- Gullies on Mars
- Life on Mars
- Mars Ocean Hypothesis
- Outflow channels
- Planetary protection
- Water on Mars
