= Newton (Martian crater) =

Martian crater Newton
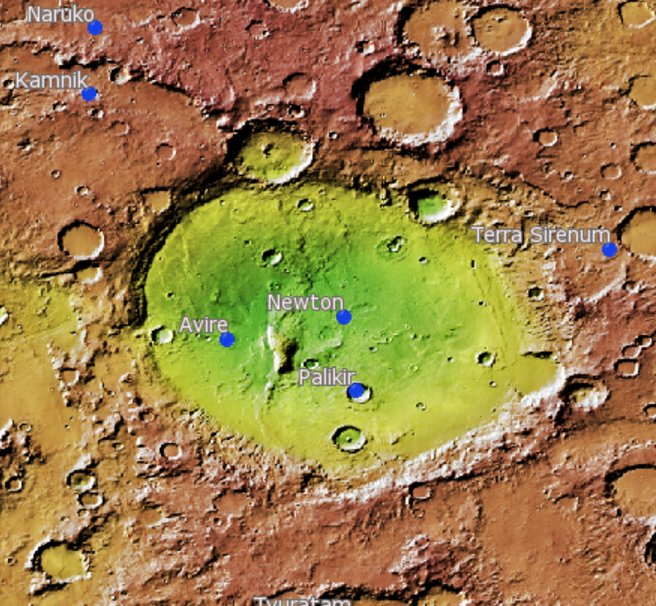
- Topographic map of Newton crater
- Planet: Mars
- Coordinates: 40.8°S 201.9°E
- Quadrangle: Phaethontis
- Diameter: 298 km
- Eponym: Isaac Newton

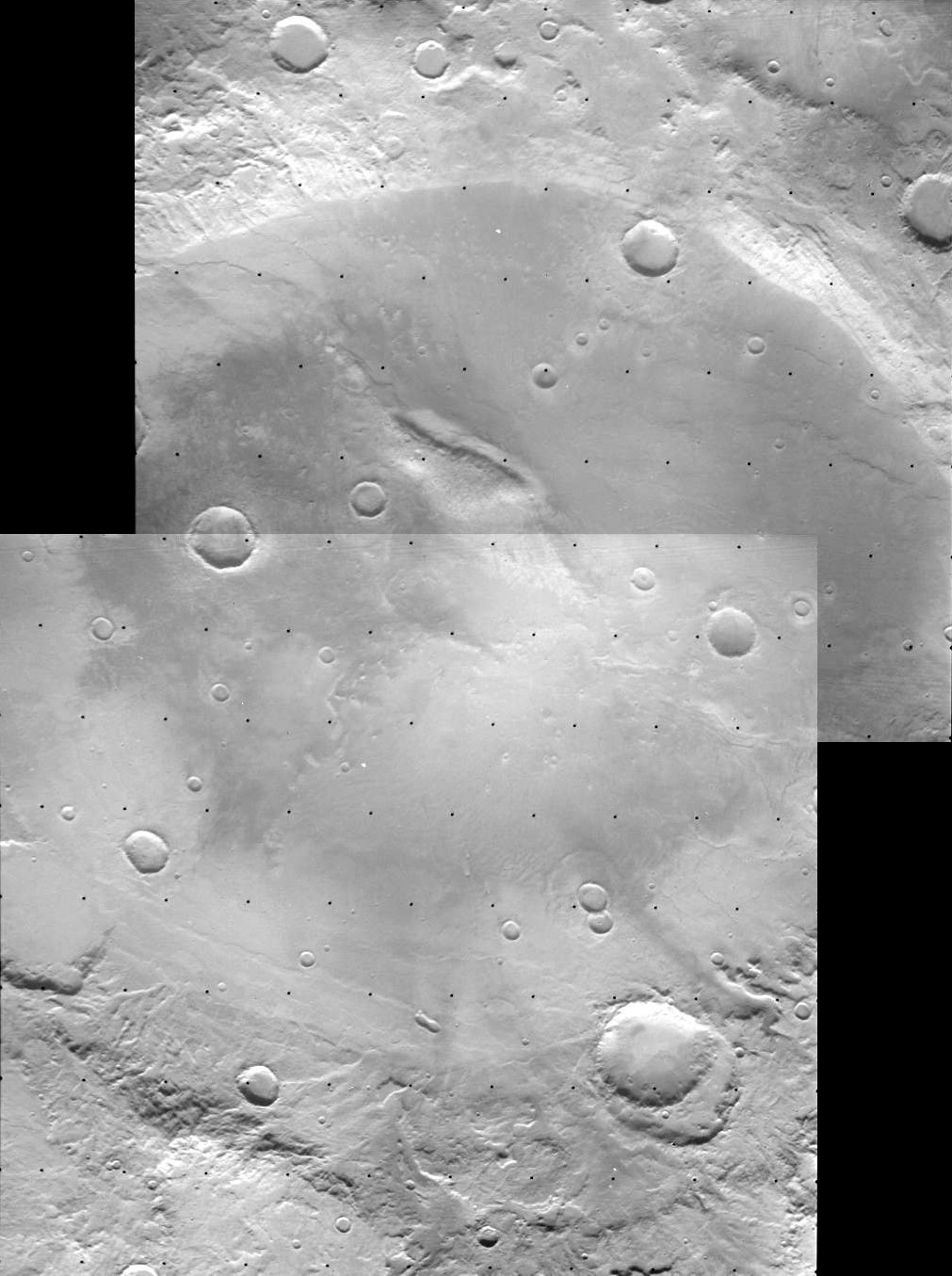
Viking Orbiter mosaic of most of Newton. Oblique view looking southwest.

Newton is a large crater on Mars, with a diameter close to 300 km. It is located south of the planet's equator in the heavily cratered highlands of Terra Sirenum in the Phaethontis quadrangle. The crater was named in 1973 by the International Astronomical Union (IAU) Working Group for Planetary System Nomenclature (WGPSN) in honor of British physicist Sir Isaac Newton.

Three smaller craters within Newton have been named. Avire is to the west of the central peak. Palikir and Dechu are to the southeast of the central peak.

== Description ==
The impact that formed Newton likely occurred more than 3 billion years ago. The crater contains smaller craters within its basin and is particularly notable for gully formations that are presumed to be indicative of past liquid water flows. Many small channels exist in this area; they are further evidence of liquid water. On the basis of their form, aspects, positions, and location amongst and apparent interaction with features thought to be rich in water ice, many researchers believed that the processes carving the gullies involve liquid water. However, this remains a topic of active research. As soon as gullies were discovered, researchers began to image many gullies over and over, looking for possible changes. By 2006, some changes were found. Later, with further analysis it was determined that the changes could have occurred by dry granular flows rather than being driven by flowing water. With continued observations many more changes were found in Gasa Crater and others. With more repeated observations, more and more changes have been found; since the changes occur in the winter and spring, experts are tending to believe that gullies were formed from dry ice. Before-and-after images demonstrated the timing of this activity coincided with seasonal carbon-dioxide frost and temperatures that would not have allowed for liquid water. When dry ice frost changes to a gas, it may lubricate dry material to flow especially on steep slopes. In some years frost, perhaps as thick as 1 meter.

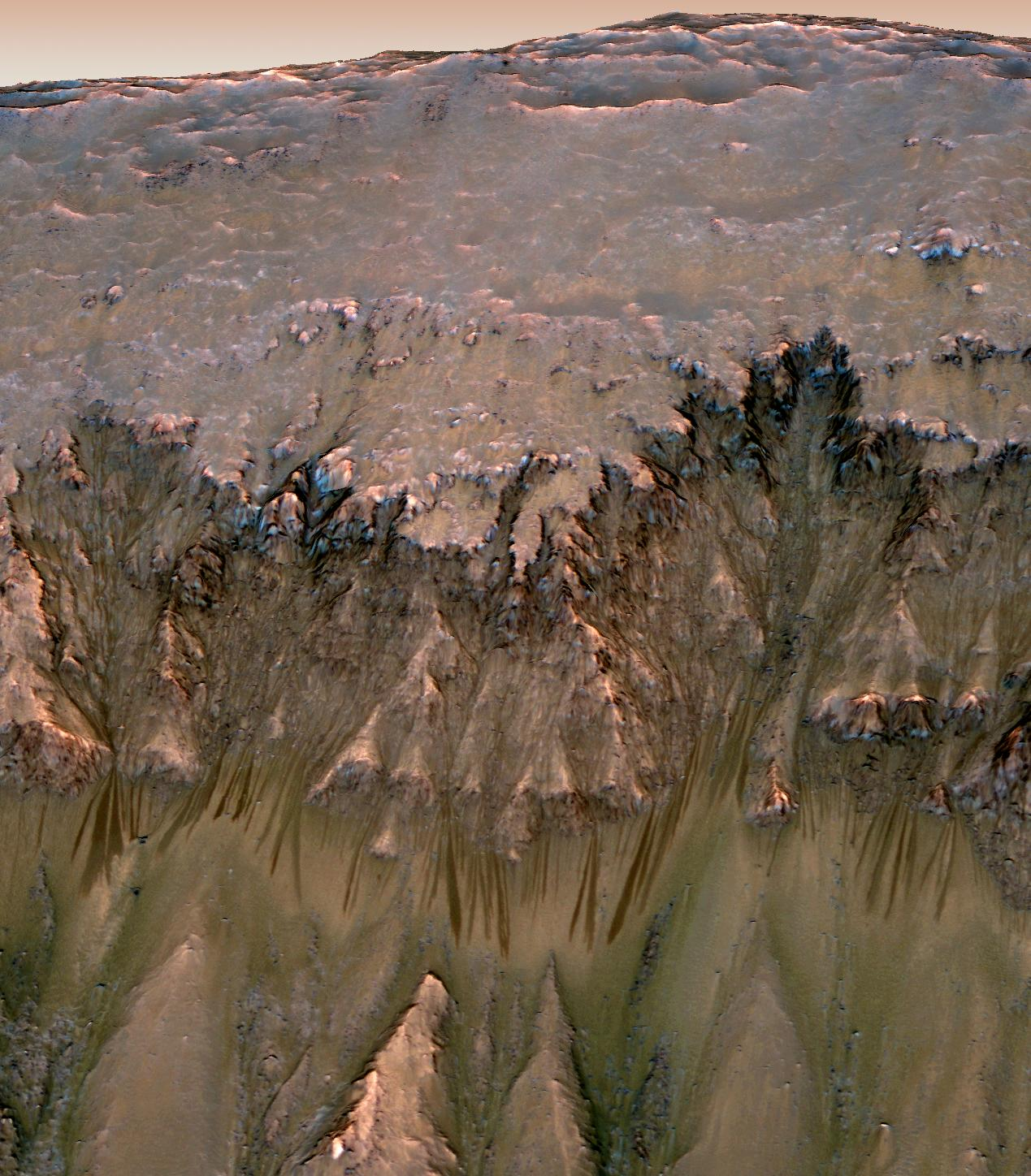
Oblique view of warm season flows in Newton Crater

In 2011 it was announced that images captured by NASA's Mars Reconnaissance Orbiter have suggested the presence of possible flowing water during the warmest months on Mars, as shown in images taken of Newton Crater and Horowitz Crater among others.

== Channels ==
There is enormous evidence that water once flowed in river valleys on Mars. Images of curved channels have been seen in images from Mars spacecraft dating back to the early seventies with the Mariner 9 orbiter. Indeed, a study published in June 2017, calculated that the volume of water needed to carve all the channels on Mars was even larger than the proposed ocean that the planet may have had. Water was probably recycled many times from the ocean to rainfall around Mars. The pictures below show a channels in Newton Crater.

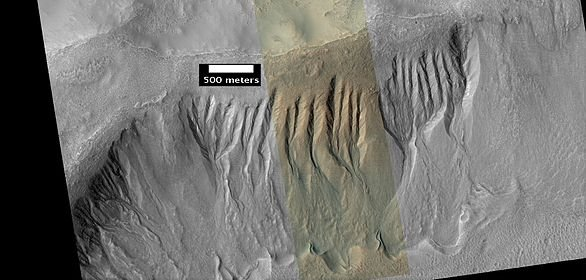
Gullies near Newton Crater, as seen by HiRISE

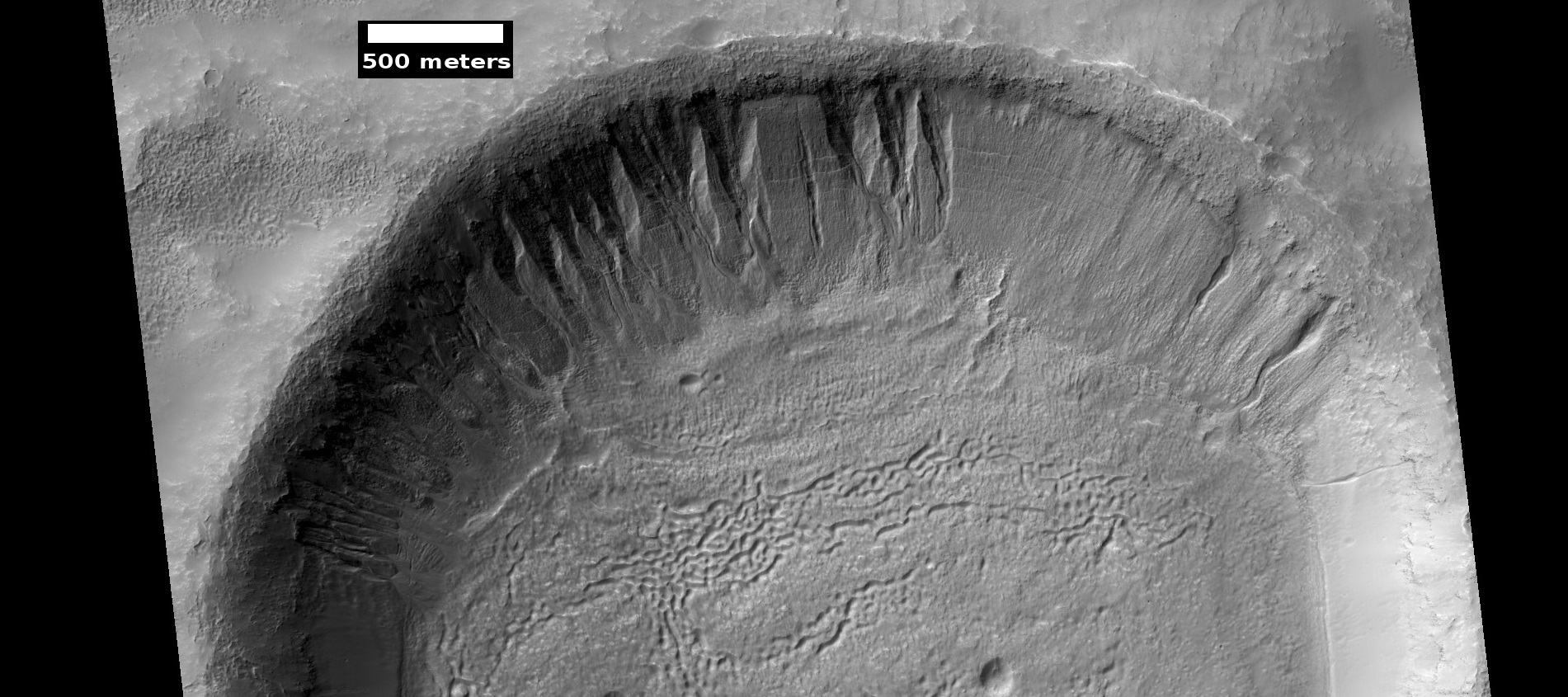
Gullies in crater on rim of unnamed crater within Newton crater, as seen by HiRISE

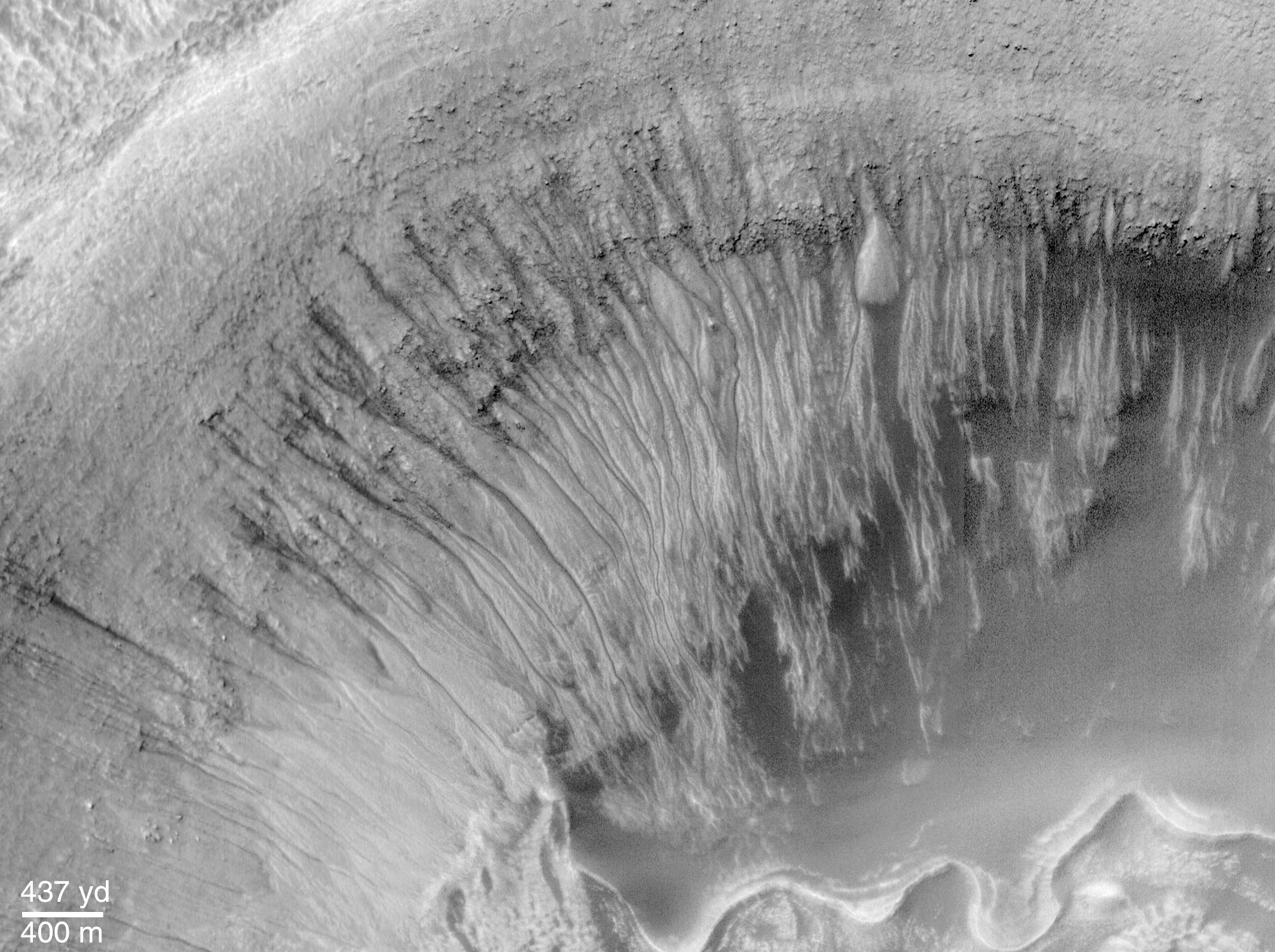
Gullies inside Avire crater within Newton crater

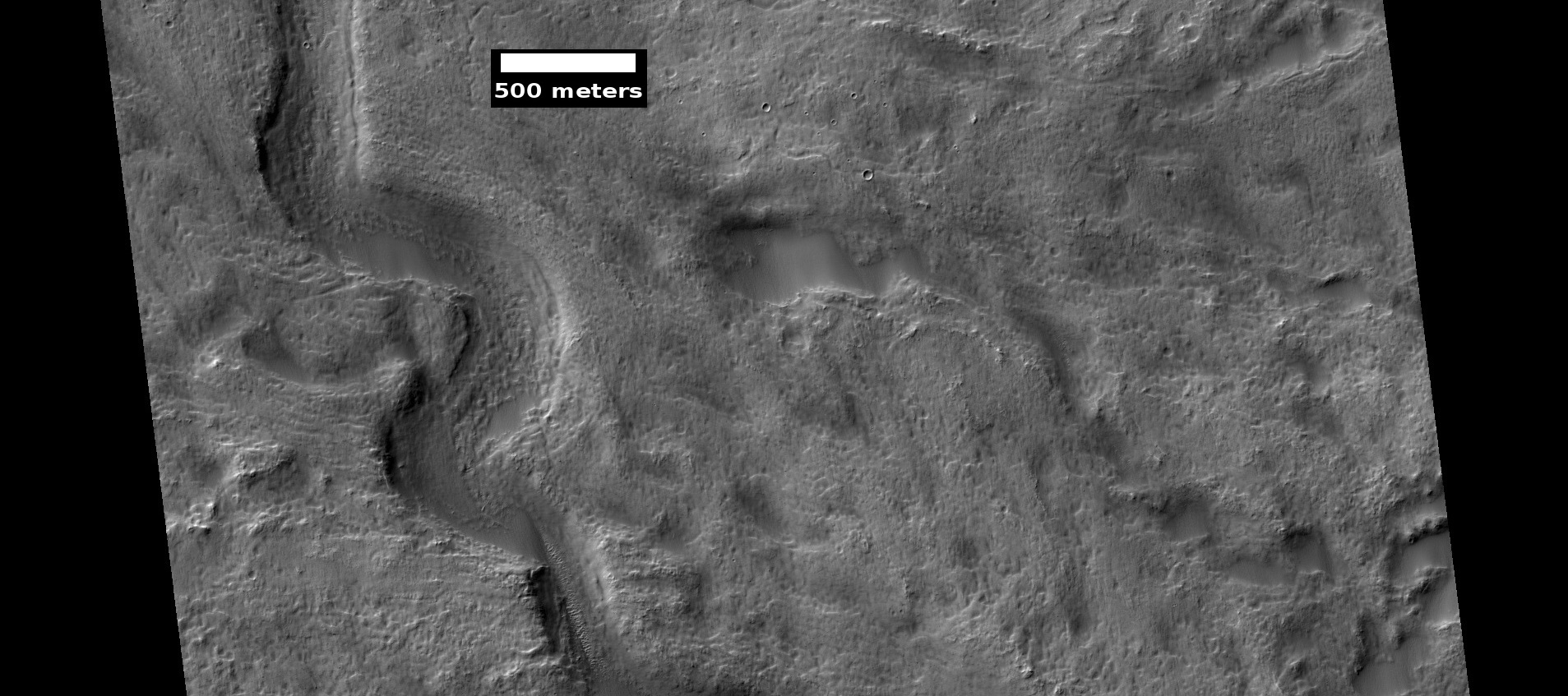
Channel on floor of Newton crater, as seen by HiRISE

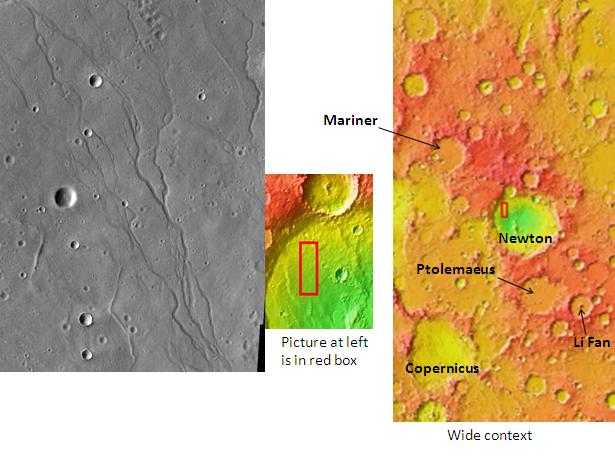
Channels on the floor of Newton crater, as seen by THEMIS

== Dunes ==
Dunes are also dominant in the middle of the large crater.

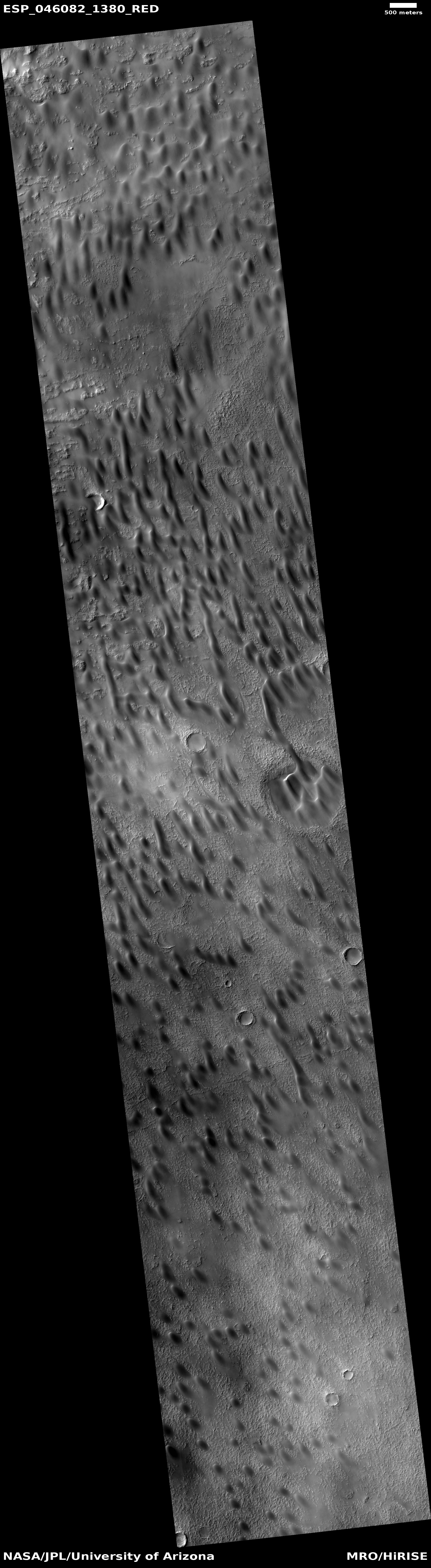
Dunes in Newton crater, as seen by HiRISE under HiWish program

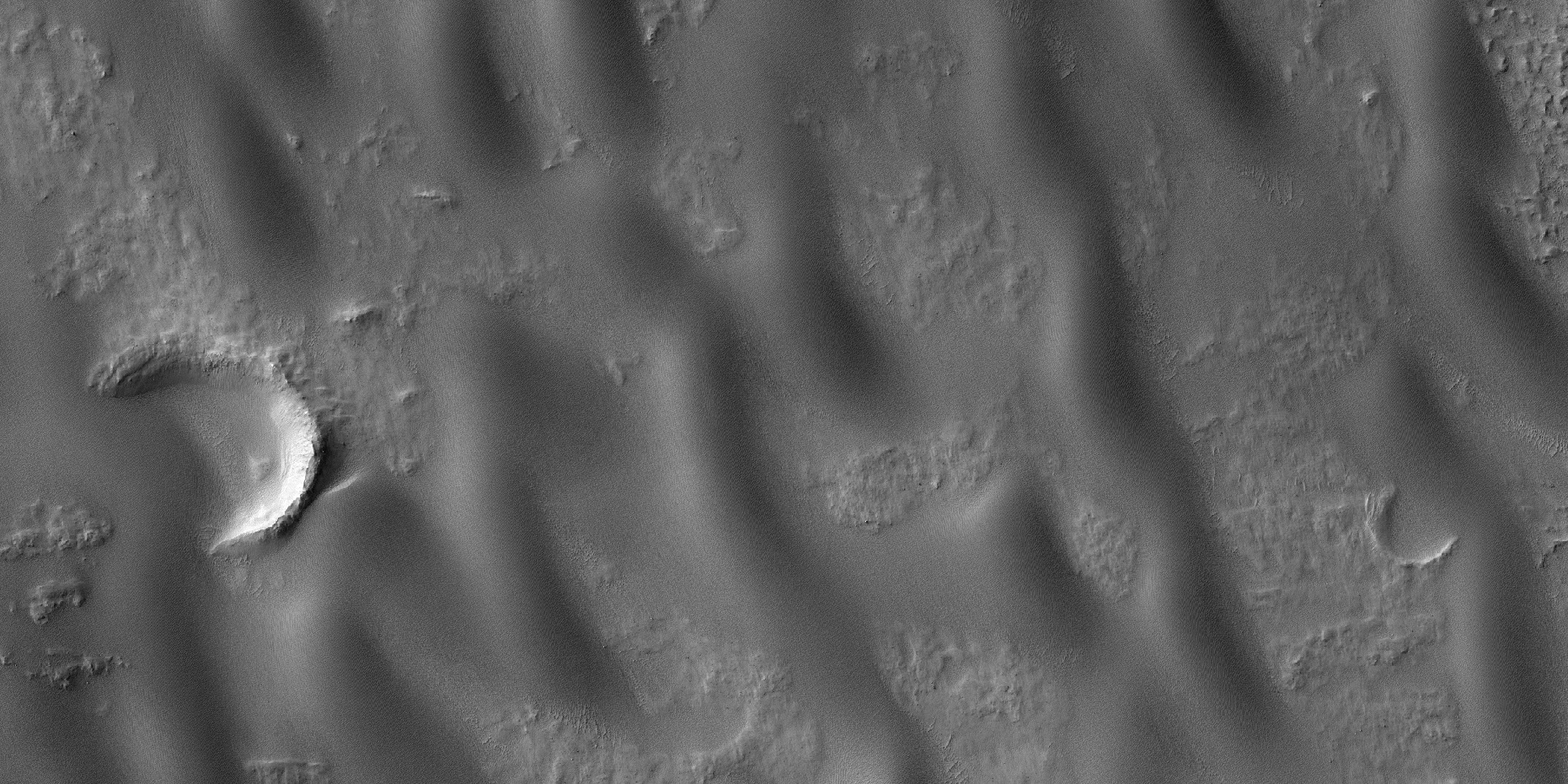
Close view of dunes in Newton crater, as seen by HiRISE under HiWish program

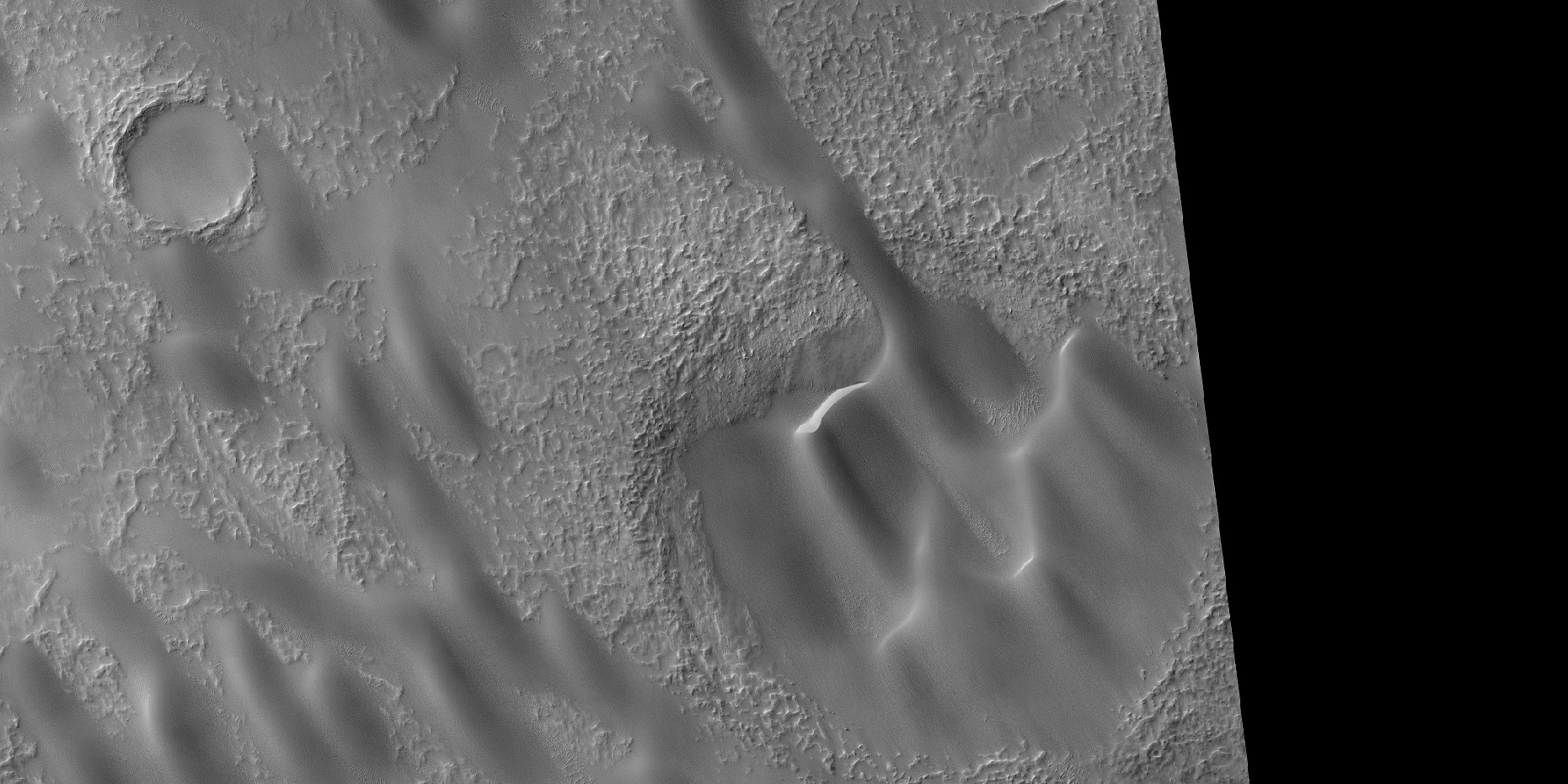
Close view of dunes in Newton crater, as seen by HiRISE under HiWish program

== See also ==
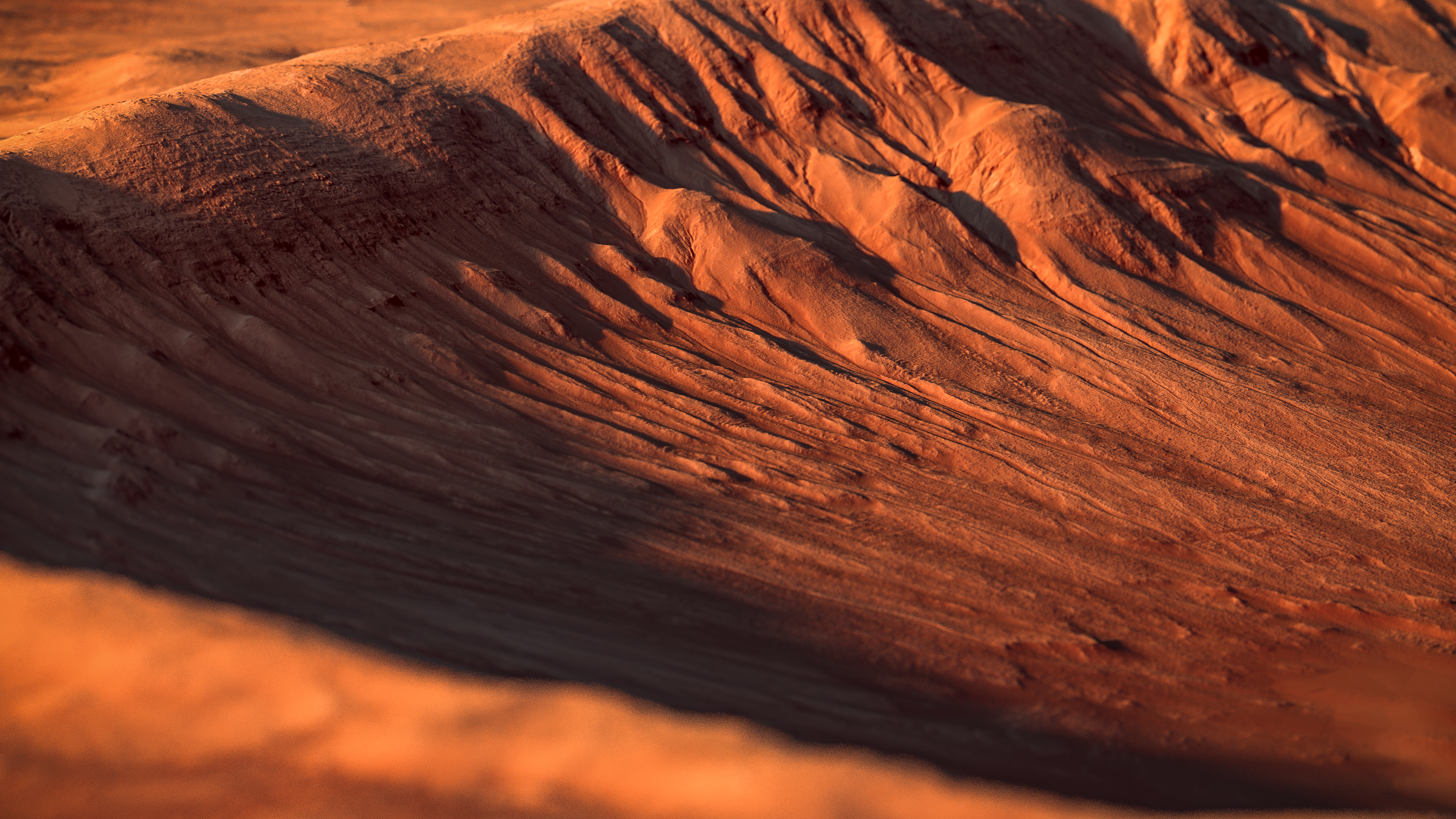
Western Rim of Palikir Crater, showing gullies and water erosion features. HiRISE image.

- Climate of Mars
- Dunes
- HiRISE
- HiWish
- Impact event
- List of craters on Mars
- Martian Gullies
- Ore resources on Mars
- Planetary nomenclature
- Seasonal flows on warm Martian slopes
- Water on Mars
