= Newton (Paolozzi) =

Sculpture by Eduardo Paolozzi in the British Library, London

Coordinates: 51.5290°N 0.1276°W

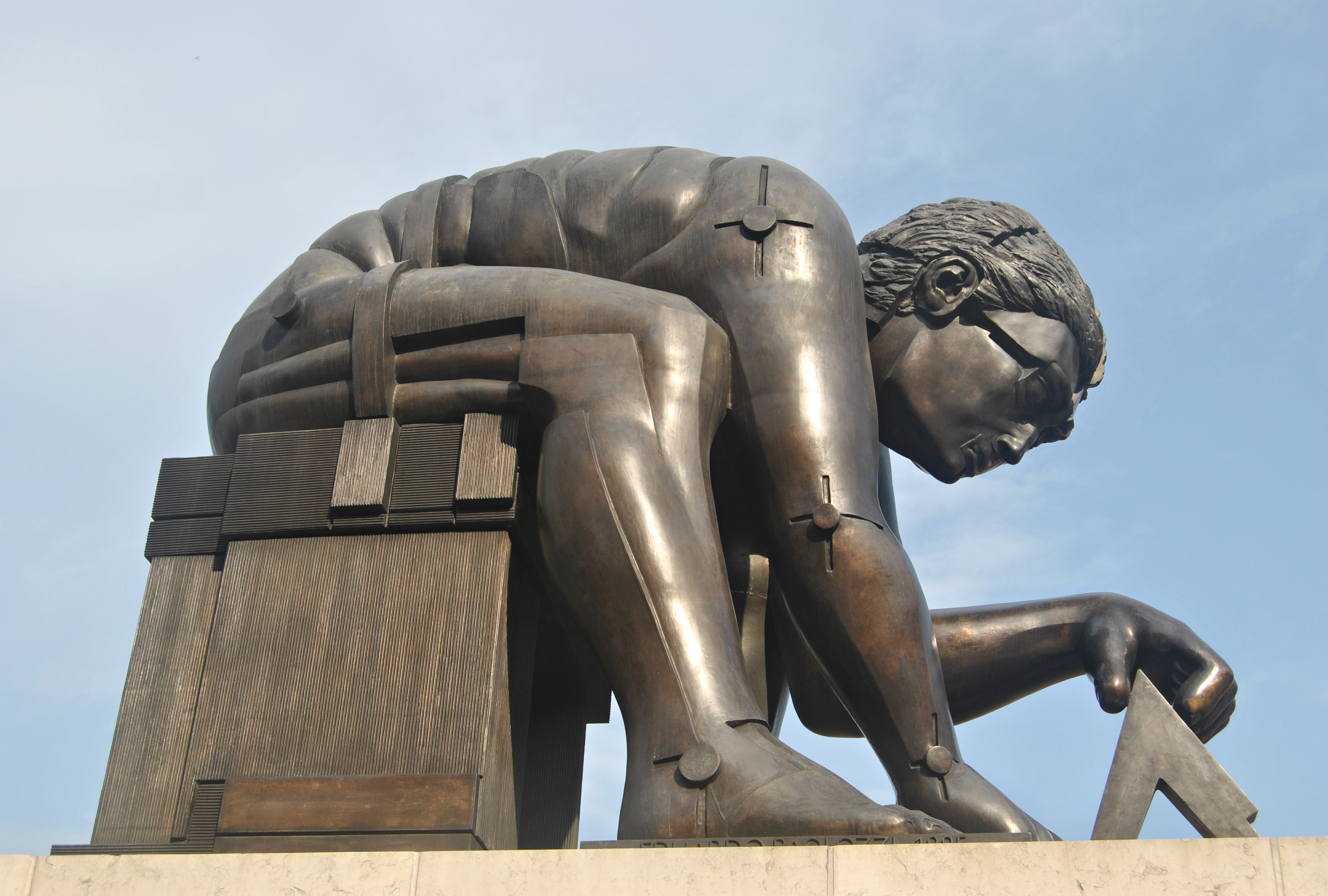
Paolozzi's Newton (1995)

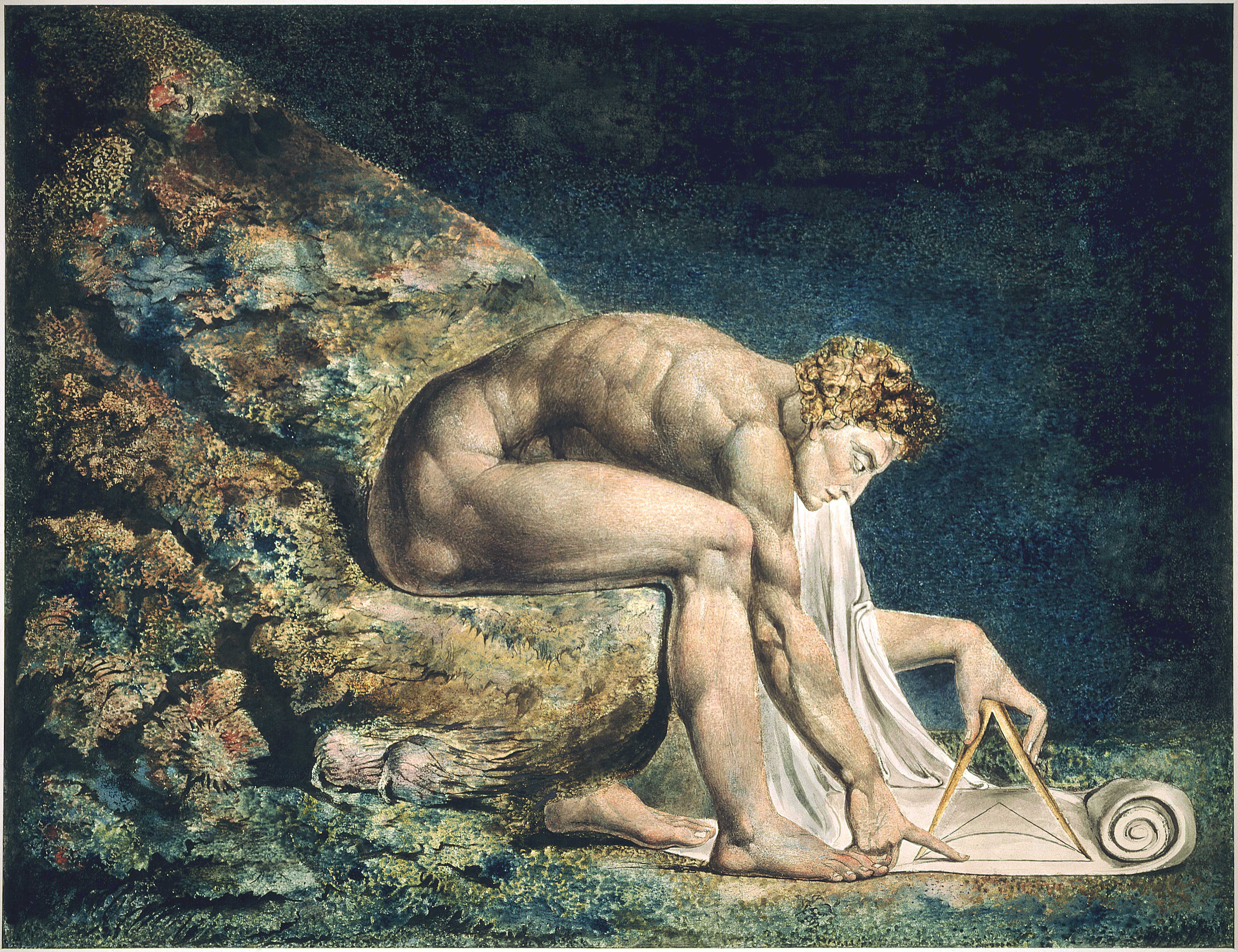
William Blake's Newton (1795)

Newton, sometimes known as Newton after Blake, is a 1995 work by the sculptor Eduardo Paolozzi. The large bronze sculpture is displayed on a high plinth in the piazza outside the British Library in London.

The sculpture is based on William Blake's 1795 print of Newton, which depicts a nude Isaac Newton sitting on ledge beside a mossy rock face while measuring with a pair of compasses or dividers. The print was intended by Blake to criticise Newton's profane knowledge, usurping the sacred knowledge and power of the creator Urizen, with the scientist turning away from nature to focus on his books.

Paolozzi had admired Blake since viewing a large print of Newton at the Tate Gallery in the 1940s. He was also a friend of Colin St John Wilson, the architect of the British Library, since they both participated in the This is Tomorrow exhibition at the Whitechapel Gallery in 1956. Wilson intended to site a seated sculpture at the junction of the two main axes in the piazza of his library. Paolozzi was then working on a sculpture of Newton, and he was commissioned to create the sculpture for the library. The new library was constructed from 1982 to 1999, and the sculpture was installed in 1995.

The sculpture includes Paolozzi's self-portrait as the naked Newton, measuring the universe with his dividers. The eyes were copied from Michelangelo's David. It can be interpreted as symbolising a confluence of the two cultures, the arts and the sciences, and illustrating how Newton changed our view of the world to one determined by mathematical laws. The sculpture makes the body resemble a mechanical object, joined with bolts at the shoulders, elbows, knees and ankles. The sculptures shows the visible seams of Paolozzi's technique of dividing his model and reassembling the pieces, for example on the head.

The final full-size sculpture stands 12 feet (3.7 m) high, and is mounted on a high plinth. The bronze was cast by the Morris Singer foundry, and funded by the Foundation for Sport and the Arts. It was included in the Grade I listing of the library, granted in 2015.

A maquette was donated by the artist to the Isaac Newton Institute for Mathematical Sciences at the University of Cambridge. A bronze model cast in 1988 "from the model made to show the Library committee", has been held by the Tate Gallery since 1995.

A similar sculpture by Paolozzi from 1989, Master of the Universe, is on display at the Scottish National Gallery in Edinburgh; while another example, Concept of Newton, is in Kowloon Park, Hong Kong.

== Gallery ==
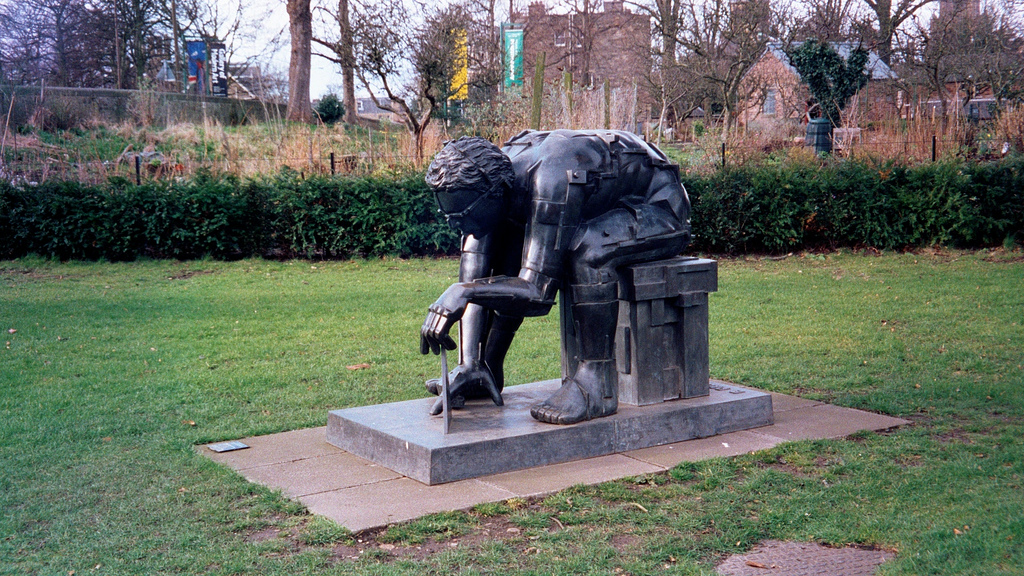
Master of the Universe (1989) at Modern Two, Edinburgh

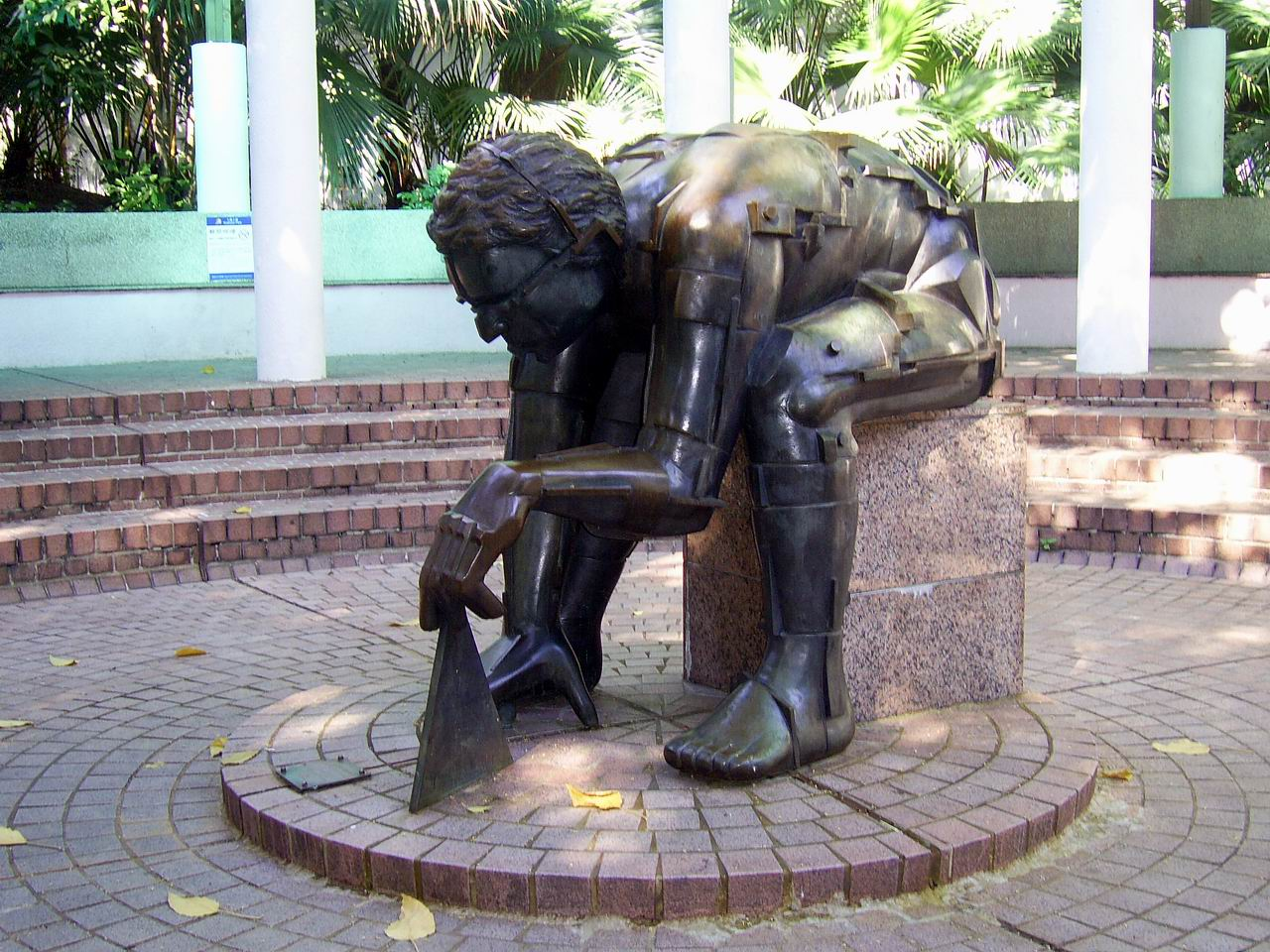
Concept of Newton in Kowloon Park, Hong Kong
