= Statal Institute of Higher Education Isaac Newton =

Istituto Statale di Istruzione Superiore Isaac Newton

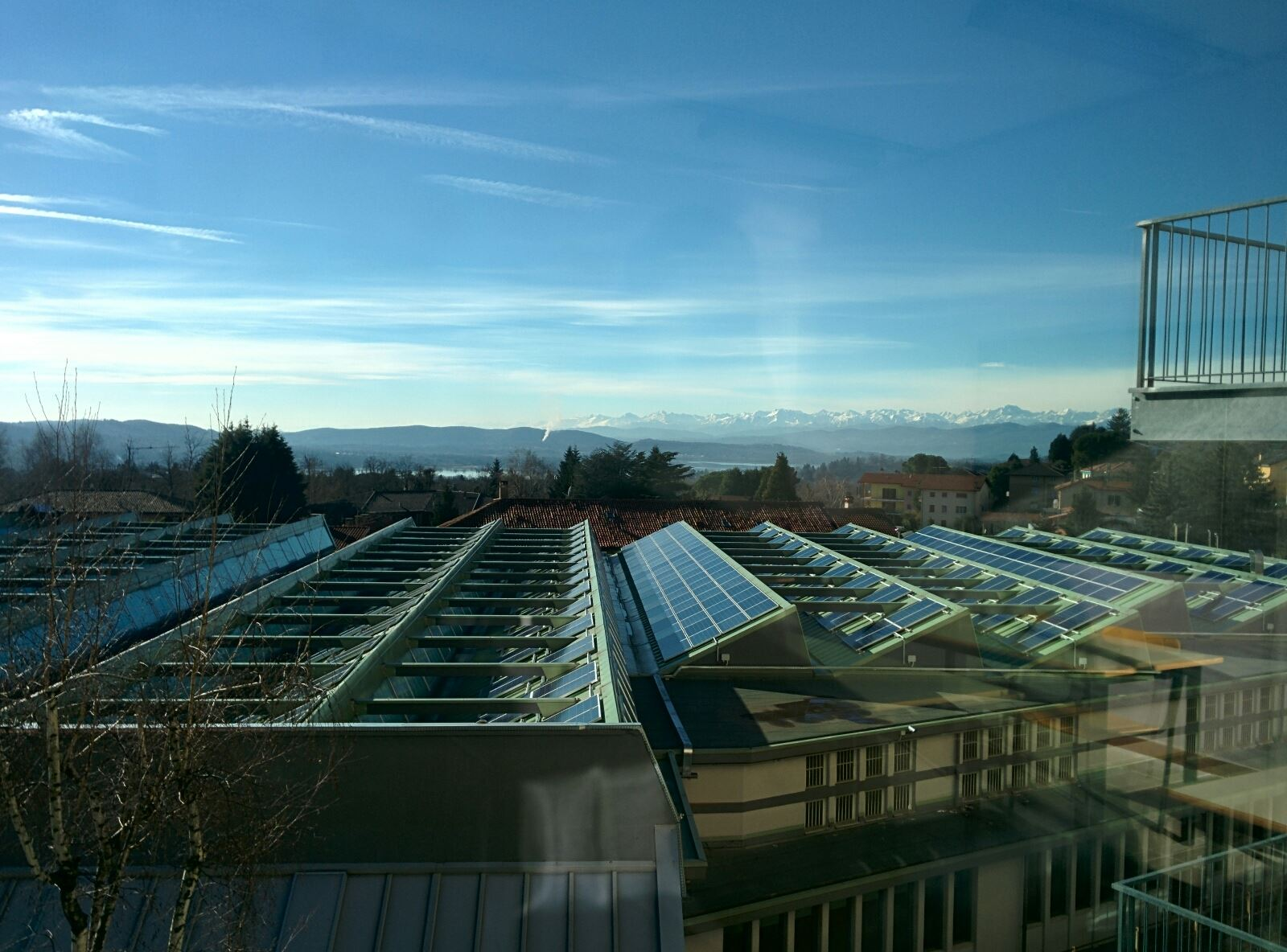

Location
- Via Gianluigi Zucchi, 3-5; Lombardy; Varese, Italy, Province of Varese, 21100
- Coordinates: 45°49′01.5″N 8°48′37.4″E

Information
- Funding type: statal
- Head of school: Daniele Marzagalli
- Schedule type: day, evening

The Statal Institute of Higher Education Isaac Newton (Italian: Istituto Statale di Istruzione Superiore Isaac Newton) is an Italian secondary school in the city of Varese. It is a technical-professional school. It assumed the current name in 2007, with the union of the Technical Industrial School of Varese (ITIS) and the Professional Institute of State for Industry and Handicrafts of Varese (IPSIA). It is located in Casbeno, in Via Gianluigi Zucchi.

== History ==
The IPSIA of Varese was born between 1960 and 1961 with the courses for the mechanical, electrical and ceramic in Laveno Mombello. Closed the headquarters of Laveno, the headquarters moved to the company Mazzucchelli in Castiglione Olona. In 2007, ITIS and IPSIA become a single multi-purpose center.

== Courses ==
Mechanical, mechatronics and energy; Chemistry, materials and biotechnology; Fashion System; Electronics and Electrical Engineering; Mechanical operator; Industrial production and craft; Maintenance and technical assistance; Services for agriculture and rural development; Evening course in Information and Communication Technology; Evening course in Mechanics and Mechatronics; Evening Course Maintenance and Technical Support
