= Laplace Island (Western Australia) =

Island in Western Australia

Laplace Island (14°11′26″S 125°39′28″E) is located off the Kimberley coast of Western Australia.
