= Newtonian dynamics =

Formulation of physics

In physics, Newtonian dynamics (also known as Newtonian mechanics) is the study of the dynamics of a particle or a small body according to Newton's laws of motion.

== Mathematical generalizations ==
Typically, the Newtonian dynamics occurs in a three-dimensional Euclidean space, which is flat. However, in mathematics Newton's laws of motion can be generalized to multidimensional and curved spaces. Often the term Newtonian dynamics is narrowed to Newton's second law $\displaystyle m\,\mathbf a=\mathbf F$.

== Newton's second law in a multidimensional space ==
Consider $\displaystyle N$ particles with masses $\displaystyle m_1,\,\ldots,\,m_N$ in the regular three-dimensional Euclidean space. Let $\displaystyle \mathbf r_1,\,\ldots,\,\mathbf r_N$ be their radius-vectors in some inertial coordinate system. Then the motion of these particles is governed by Newton's second law applied to each of them

$\frac{d\mathbf r_i}{dt}=\mathbf v_i,\qquad\frac{d\mathbf v_i}{dt}=\frac{\mathbf F_i(\mathbf r_1,\ldots,\mathbf r_N,\mathbf v_1,\ldots,\mathbf v_N,t)}{m_i},\quad i=1,\ldots,N.$	1

The three-dimensional radius-vectors $\displaystyle\mathbf r_1,\,\ldots,\,\mathbf r_N$ can be built into a single $\displaystyle n=3N$-dimensional radius-vector. Similarly, three-dimensional velocity vectors $\displaystyle\mathbf v_1,\,\ldots,\,\mathbf v_N$ can be built into a single $\displaystyle n=3N$-dimensional velocity vector:

$\mathbf r=\begin{Vmatrix} \mathbf r_1\\ \vdots\\ \mathbf r_N\end{Vmatrix},\qquad\qquad \mathbf v=\begin{Vmatrix} \mathbf v_1\\ \vdots\\ \mathbf v_N\end{Vmatrix}.$	2

In terms of the multidimensional vectors (2) the equations (1) are written as

$\frac{d\mathbf r}{dt}=\mathbf v,\qquad\frac{d\mathbf v}{dt}=\mathbf F(\mathbf r,\mathbf v,t),$	3

i.e. they take the form of Newton's second law applied to a single particle with the unit mass $\displaystyle m=1$.

Definition. The equations (3) are called the equations of a Newtonian dynamical system in a flat multidimensional Euclidean space, which is called the configuration space of this system. Its points are marked by the radius-vector $\displaystyle\mathbf r$. The space whose points are marked by the pair of vectors $\displaystyle(\mathbf r,\mathbf v)$ is called the phase space of the dynamical system (3).

== Euclidean structure ==
The configuration space and the phase space of the dynamical system (3) both are Euclidean spaces, i. e. they are equipped with a Euclidean structure. The Euclidean structure of them is defined so that the kinetic energy of the single multidimensional particle with the unit mass $\displaystyle m=1$ is equal to the sum of kinetic energies of the three-dimensional particles with the masses $\displaystyle m_1,\,\ldots,\,m_N$:

$T=\frac{\Vert\mathbf v\Vert^2}{2}=\sum^N_{i=1}m_i\,\frac{\Vert\mathbf v_i\Vert^2}{2}$.	4

== Constraints and internal coordinates ==
In some cases the motion of the particles with the masses $\displaystyle m_1,\,\ldots,\,m_N$ can be constrained. Typical constraints look like scalar equations of the form

$\displaystyle\varphi_i(\mathbf r_1,\ldots,\mathbf r_N)=0,\quad i=1,\,\ldots,\,K$.	5

Constraints of the form (5) are called holonomic and scleronomic. In terms of the radius-vector $\displaystyle\mathbf r$ of the Newtonian dynamical system (3) they are written as

$\displaystyle\varphi_i(\mathbf r)=0,\quad i=1,\,\ldots,\,K$.	6

Each such constraint reduces by one the number of degrees of freedom of the Newtonian dynamical system (3). Therefore, the constrained system has $\displaystyle n=3\,N-K$ degrees of freedom.

Definition. The constraint equations (6) define an $\displaystyle n$-dimensional manifold $\displaystyle M$ within the configuration space of the Newtonian dynamical system (3). This manifold $\displaystyle M$ is called the configuration space of the constrained system. Its tangent bundle $\displaystyle TM$ is called the phase space of the constrained system.

Let $\displaystyle q^1,\,\ldots,\,q^n$ be the internal coordinates of a point of $\displaystyle M$. Their usage is typical for the Lagrangian mechanics. The radius-vector $\displaystyle\mathbf r$ is expressed as some definite function of $\displaystyle q^1,\,\ldots,\,q^n$:

$\displaystyle\mathbf r=\mathbf r(q^1,\,\ldots,\,q^n)$.	7

The vector-function (7) resolves the constraint equations (6) in the sense that upon substituting (7) into (6) the equations (6) are fulfilled identically in $\displaystyle q^1,\,\ldots,\,q^n$.

== Internal presentation of the velocity vector ==
The velocity vector of the constrained Newtonian dynamical system is expressed in terms of the partial derivatives of the vector-function (7):

$\displaystyle\mathbf v=\sum^n_{i=1}\frac{\partial\mathbf r}{\partial q^i}\,\dot q^i$.	8

The quantities $\displaystyle\dot q^1,\,\ldots,\,\dot q^n$ are called internal components of the velocity vector. Sometimes they are denoted with the use of a separate symbol

$\displaystyle\dot q^i=w^i,\qquad i=1,\,\ldots,\,n$	9

and then treated as independent variables. The quantities

$\displaystyle q^1,\,\ldots,\,q^n,\,w^1,\,\ldots,\,w^n$	10

are used as internal coordinates of a point of the phase space $\displaystyle TM$ of the constrained Newtonian dynamical system.

== Embedding and the induced Riemannian metric ==
Geometrically, the vector-function (7) implements an embedding of the configuration space $\displaystyle M$ of the constrained Newtonian dynamical system into the $\displaystyle 3\,N$-dimensional flat configuration space of the unconstrained Newtonian dynamical system (3). Due to this embedding the Euclidean structure of the ambient space induces the Riemannian metric onto the manifold $\displaystyle M$. The components of the metric tensor of this induced metric are given by the formula

$\displaystyle g_{ij}=\left(\frac{\partial\mathbf r}{\partial q^i},\frac{\partial\mathbf r}{\partial q^j}\right)$,	11

where $\displaystyle(\ ,\ )$ is the scalar product associated with the Euclidean structure (4).

== Kinetic energy of a constrained Newtonian dynamical system ==
Since the Euclidean structure of an unconstrained system of $\displaystyle N$ particles is introduced through their kinetic energy, the induced Riemannian structure on the configuration space $\displaystyle N$ of a constrained system preserves this relation to the kinetic energy:

$T=\frac{1}{2}\sum^n_{i=1}\sum^n_{j=1}g_{ij}\,w^i\,w^j$.	12

The formula (12) is derived by substituting (8) into (4) and taking into account (11).

== Constraint forces ==
For a constrained Newtonian dynamical system the constraints described by the equations (6) are usually implemented by some mechanical framework. This framework produces some auxiliary forces including the force that maintains the system within its configuration manifold $\displaystyle M$. Such a maintaining force is perpendicular to $\displaystyle M$. It is called the normal force. The force $\displaystyle\mathbf F$ from (6) is subdivided into two components

$\mathbf F=\mathbf F_\parallel+\mathbf F_\perp$.	13

The first component in (13) is tangent to the configuration manifold $\displaystyle M$. The second component is perpendicular to $\displaystyle M$. In coincides with the normal force $\displaystyle\mathbf N$.
Like the velocity vector (8), the tangent force $\displaystyle\mathbf F_\parallel$ has its internal presentation

$\displaystyle\mathbf F_\parallel=\sum^n_{i=1}\frac{\partial\mathbf r}{\partial q^i}\,F^i$.	14

The quantities $F^1,\,\ldots,\,F^n$ in (14) are called the internal components of the force vector.

== Newton's second law in a curved space ==
The Newtonian dynamical system (3) constrained to the configuration manifold $\displaystyle M$ by the constraint equations (6) is described by the differential equations

$\frac{dq^s}{dt}=w^s,\qquad\frac{d w^s}{dt}+\sum^n_{i=1}\sum^n_{j=1}\Gamma^s_{ij}\,w^i\,w^j=F^s,\qquad s=1,\,\ldots,\,n$,	15

where $\Gamma^s_{ij}$ are Christoffel symbols of the metric connection produced by the Riemannian metric (11).

== Relation to Lagrange equations ==
Mechanical systems with constraints are usually described by Lagrange equations:

$\frac{dq^s}{dt}=w^s,\qquad\frac{d}{dt}\left(\frac{\partial T}{\partial w^s}\right)-\frac{\partial T}{\partial q^s}=Q_s,\qquad s=1,\,\ldots,\,n$,	16

where $T=T(q^1,\ldots,q^n,w^1,\ldots,w^n)$ is the kinetic energy the constrained dynamical system given by the formula (12). The quantities $Q_1,\,\ldots,\,Q_n$ in (16) are the inner covariant components of the tangent force vector $\mathbf F_\parallel$ (see (13) and (14)). They are produced from the inner contravariant components $F^1,\,\ldots,\,F^n$ of the vector $\mathbf F_\parallel$ by means of the standard index lowering procedure using the metric (11):

$Q_s=\sum^n_{r=1}g_{sr}\,F^r,\qquad s=1,\,\ldots,\,n$,	17

The equations (16) are equivalent to the equations (15). However, the metric (11) and other geometric features of the configuration manifold $\displaystyle M$ are not explicit in (16). The metric (11) can be recovered from the kinetic energy $\displaystyle T$ by means of the formula

$g_{ij}=\frac{\partial^2T}{\partial w^i\,\partial w^j}$.	18

== See also ==
- Modified Newtonian dynamics
