= Cape Mousse =

Antarctic rocky cape

Cape Mousse (66°48′S 141°28′E) is a small rocky cape, fringed by many small islands and backed by moraine close to the south, protruding through the coastal icecap 4.6 kilometres (2.5 nmi) southwest of Cape Decouverte. Photographed from the air by U.S. Navy Operation Highjump, 1946–47. Charted by the French Antarctic Expedition, 1949–51, and so named by them because several patches of lichens were found on the exposed rocky surfaces. Mousse is French for 'moss'.
