= Salisbury Island =

Salisbury Island may refer to:

- Salisbury Island (California), United States
- Salisbury Island (Nunavut), Canada
- Salisbury Island (Russia)
- Salisbury Island (Western Australia), Australia
- Iona Island (New York), once known as Salisbury Island
- Salisbury Island, Durban, a former island now part of the Port of Durban in South Africa, it is home to Naval Station Durban
