= Gulch Island =

Gulch Island may refer to:

- Gulch Island (Antarctica) 63°59′S 61°29′W
- Gulch Island (Western Australia) 34°01′31″S 123°14′50″E
