= Recherche Archipelago =

Group of 105 islands in southern Western Australia

Location of the Recherche Archipelago

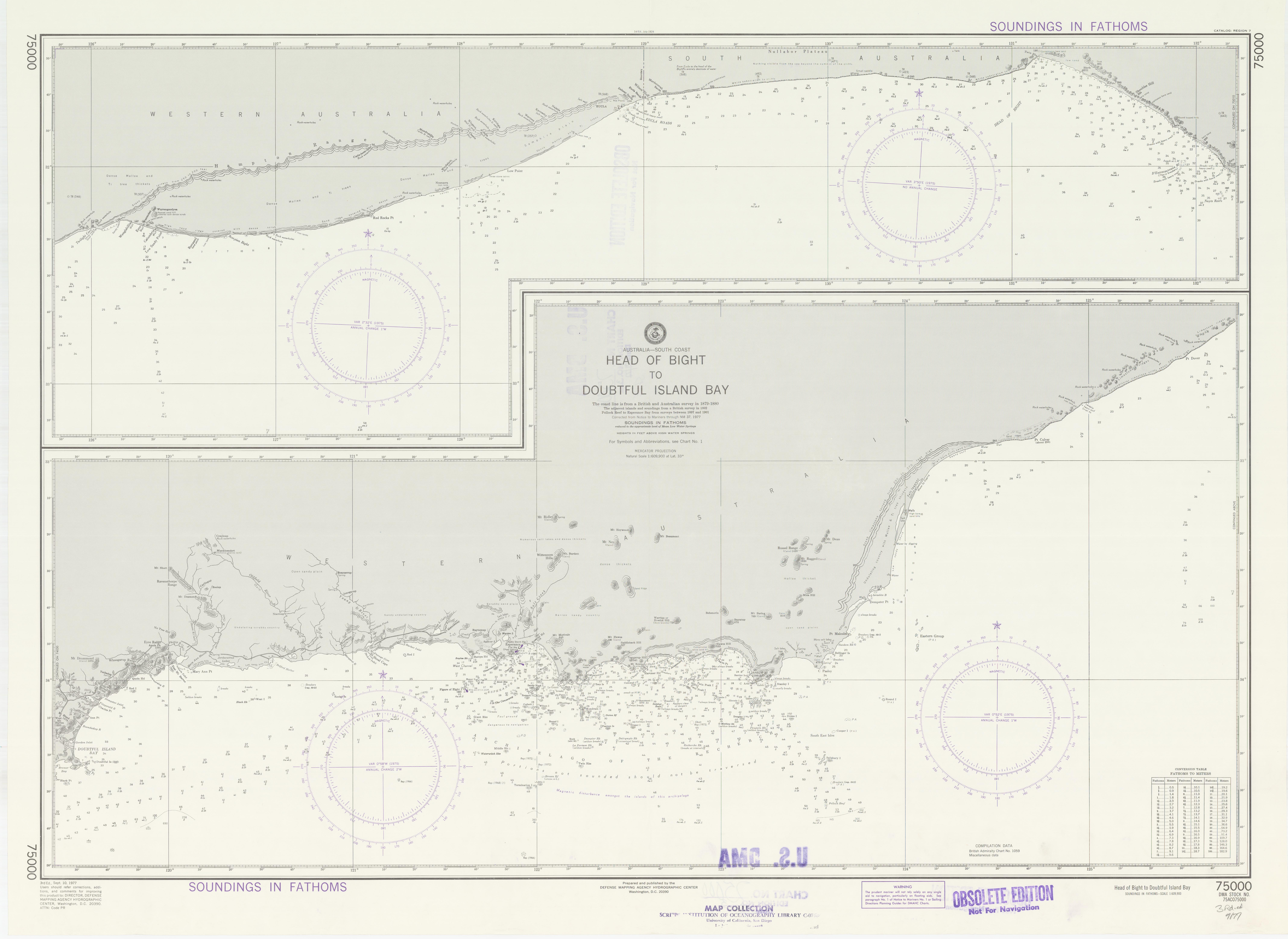
Nautical Chart showing the archipelago

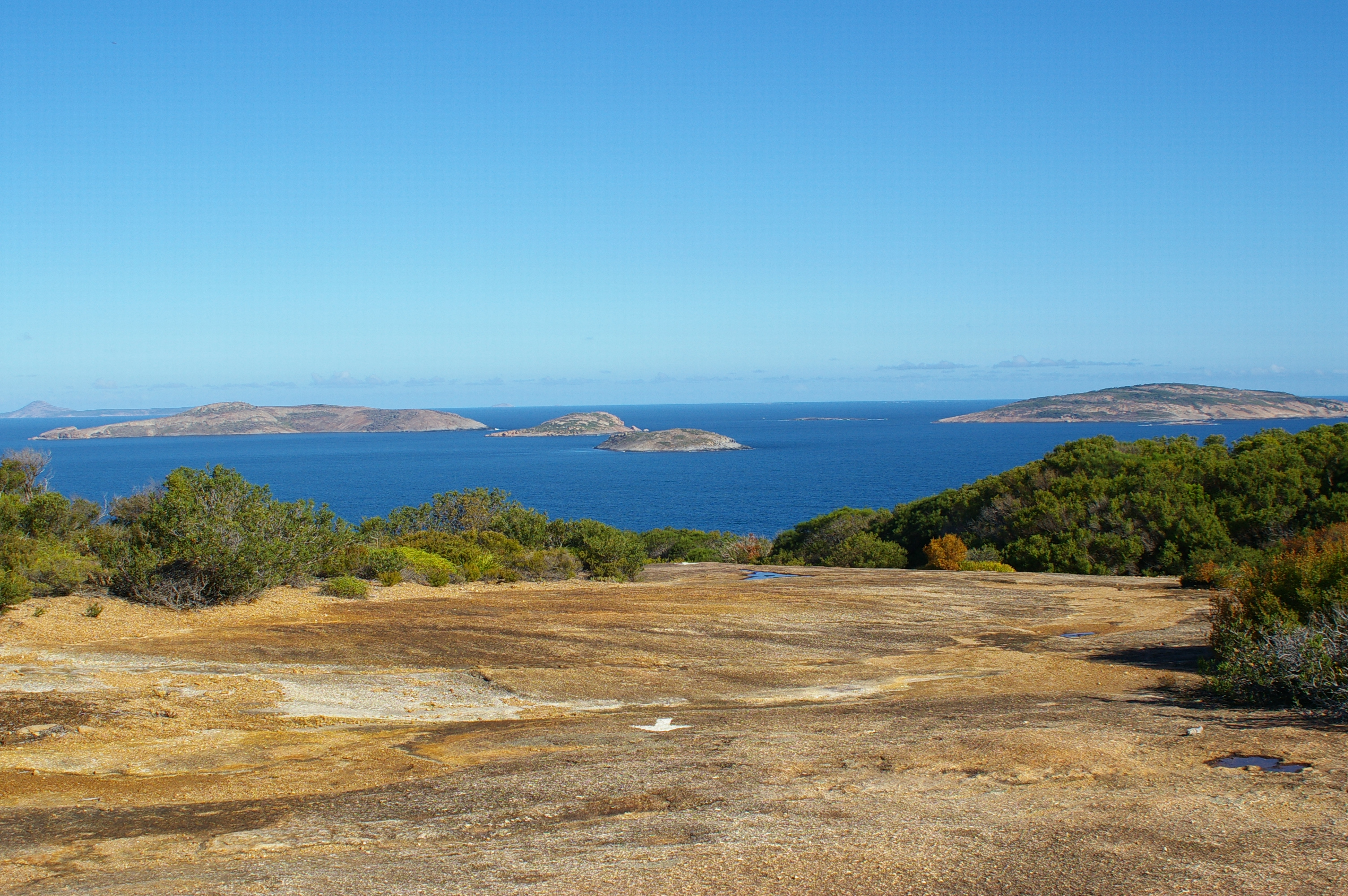
View of the Recherche Archipelago from Dempster Head

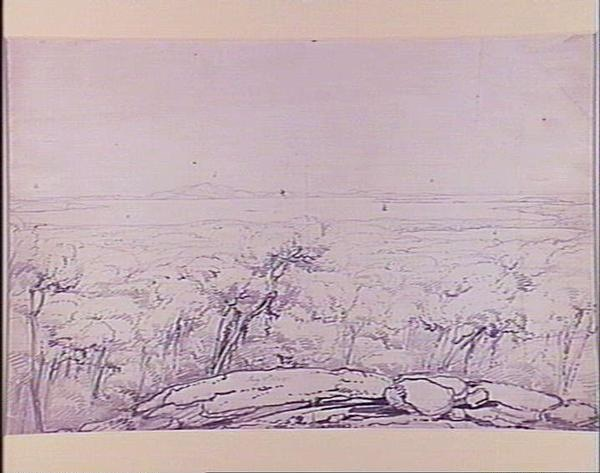
A drawing from the Westall collection with the title "Middle Island, view north to Cape Arid".

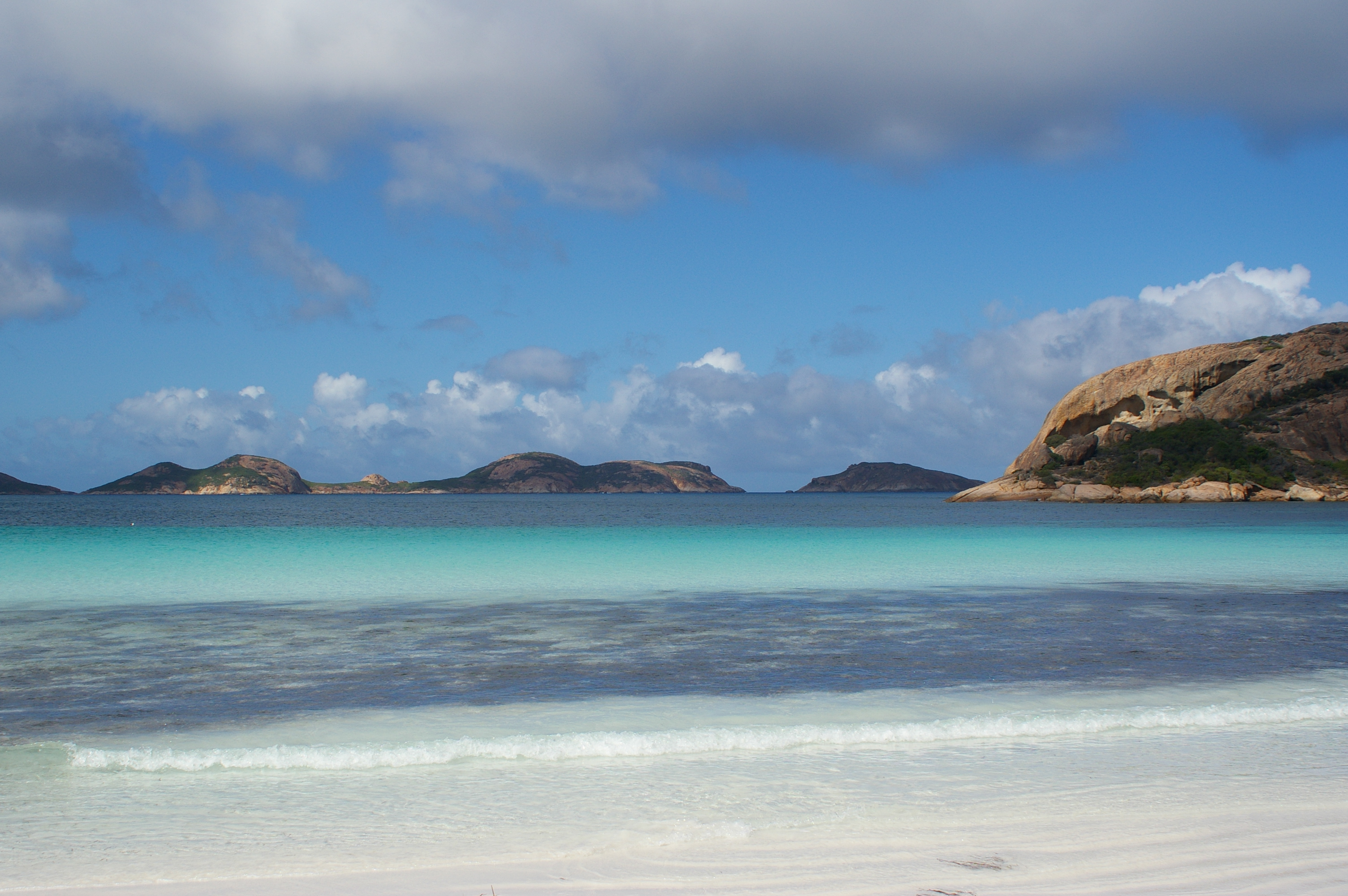
View of the Recherche Archipelago from Lucky Bay, Cape Le Grand National Park

The Archipelago of the Recherche, known locally as the Bay of Isles, is a group of 105 islands, and over 1200 "obstacles to shipping", off the south coast of Western Australia. The islands stretch 230 km (140 mi) from east to west and to 50 km (31 mi) off-shore encompassing an area of approximately 4,000 square kilometres (1,544 sq mi). The western group is near Esperance and the eastern group at Israelite Bay. They are located in coastal waters, part of which is designated the Recherche Archipelago Nature Reserve.

== History ==
=== Pre-European ===
Recherche Archipelago exhibits evidence of human occupation dated to 13,000 years ago. Archeologists have found ancient artefacts on Salisbury Island, a massive limestone remnant sitting on a granite dome 60 kilometres (37 mi) offshore, that included stone blades, lizard traps, axe heads, grinding stones and granite watering holes. The objects are believed to extend up to 13,000 years before present, from a time of lower sea levels when many of the islands were joined to the mainland.

=== European discovery and naming ===
The islands became known to Europeans when François Thijssen and Pieter Nuyts, sailing on Gulden Zeepaert, charted the coast in 1627. George Vancouver also passed through the archipelago as part of his expedition in HMS Discovery in 1791. The area was named Archipelago of the Recherche (French: l'Archipel de la Recherche, IPA: [laʁʃipɛl də la ʁəʃɛʁʃ]) by Rear-admiral Antoine Bruni d'Entrecasteaux in 1792 during a French expedition in search of the vanished navigator Jean-François de Galaup, comte de Lapérouse. The name was taken from one of the admiral's ships, Recherche ("Research"). The bay containing the current town of Esperance was named for his other ship, Espérance. Matthew Flinders was the first to explore and chart the islands of the archipelago in 1802 as part of his voyage in the Investigator.

=== Maritime history ===
Flinders abandoned two anchors when leaving Middle Island in 1803. These were found and recovered in 1973 by divers. The bower anchor is on display at the South Australian Maritime Museum while the stream anchor can be seen at the National Museum of Australia.

Sealers and whalers from other British colonies on the Australian continent frequented the area since at least the early 1820s. Australia's only recorded pirate, Black Jack Anderson, frequented the archipelago in the 1830s. A former whaler, he turned to piracy and wreaked havoc in the area until being murdered by his crew. Middle Island was regarded as the right whale hunting station of the bight in the 1830s and 1840s.

The archipelago is recorded as the site of shipwrecks and other maritime incidents. The brig Belinda was wrecked off Middle Island while sealing in late 1824. The crew unsuccessfully attempted to reach Sydney in two boats, and were eventually rescued by the Nereus. The schooner Liberty salvaged the wreck the following year collecting metal stores and both the anchors. The Mountaineer was sunk off Thistle Cove near Cape Le Grand in 1835 while attempting to find shelter from a gale. The Rodondo was thought to be wrecked on Polloch Reef off Salisbury Island in 1895. The SS Penguin was wrecked in 1920 off Middle Island while trying to shelter from a gale. The vessel was salvaged later the following year. On 14 February 1991 the Sanko Harvest a bulk carrier of 33,024 tons sank in the archipelago – and it became the second largest wreck that can be dived on in the world. The response to pollution caused by the wreck was reported upon soon after.

Uses of the area now include recreational and commercial fishing, and shipping from the Port of Esperance. Commercial fishing is primarily for abalone, southern rock lobsters, pilchards, and sharks, and fishing tourism is an established industry. The area is proposed for other applications of aquaculture, including farming trials of bluefin tuna.

== Geography ==
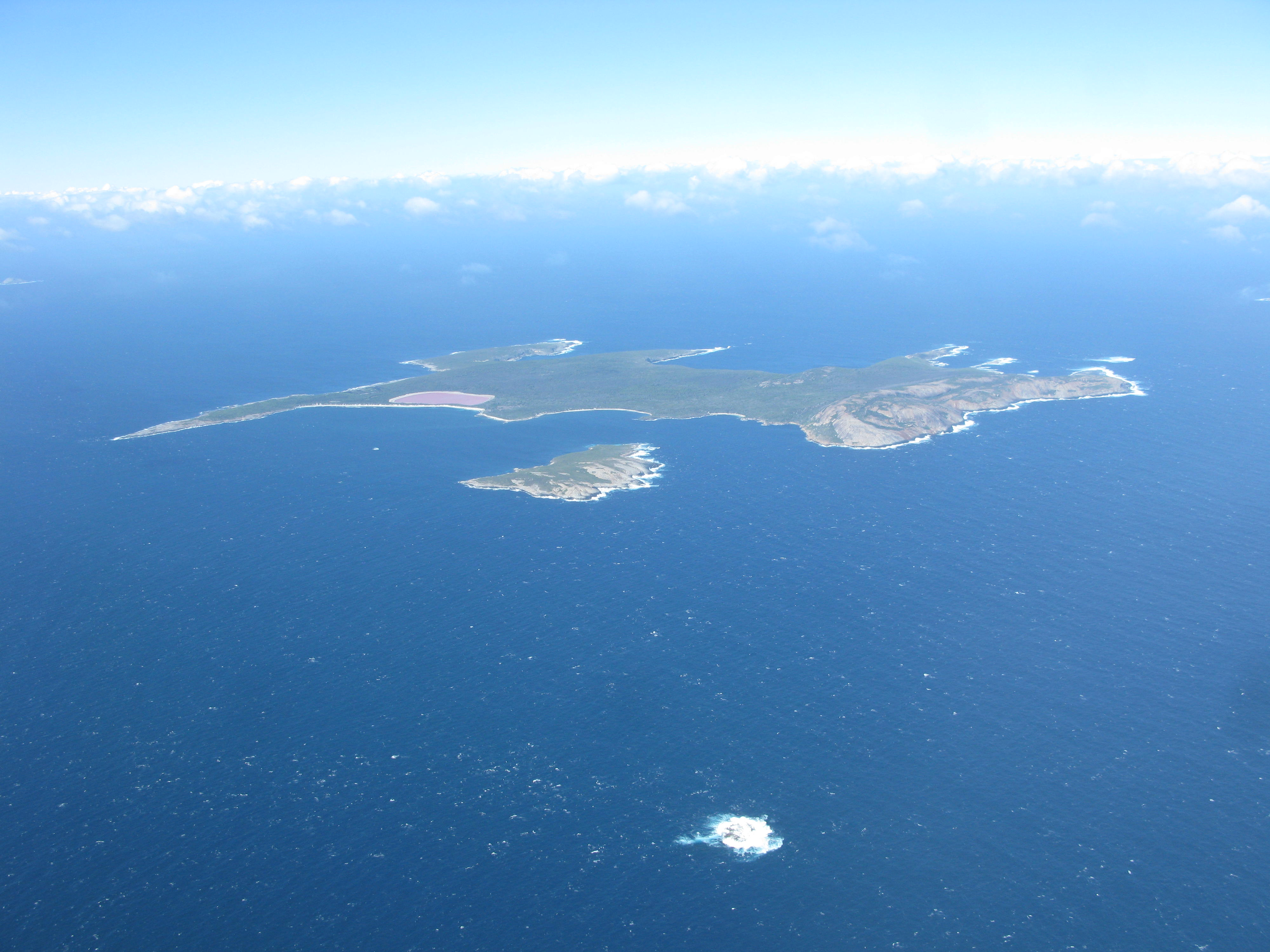
Middle Island, Recherche Archipelago 2011

The archipelago includes 105 features classed as islands, and more than 1500 islets. The islands of the archipelago have a combined area of 9,720 hectares (24,019 acres). The islands are generally composed of granite outcrops, often with steep slopes and usually lacking beaches. A large number of features are submerged, some becoming exposed by tides. The coast is subject to some of the most extreme wave energy in all of Australia, with the wave energy causing abrasion as far down as 100 metres (328 ft) during storms. The inner shelf of the archipelago has an average depth of 40 metres (131 ft) with most of the islands being in 60 metres (197 ft) of water. Middle Island with an area of 1,080 hectares (2,669 acres) is the largest island in the Archipelago.

=== Groups ===
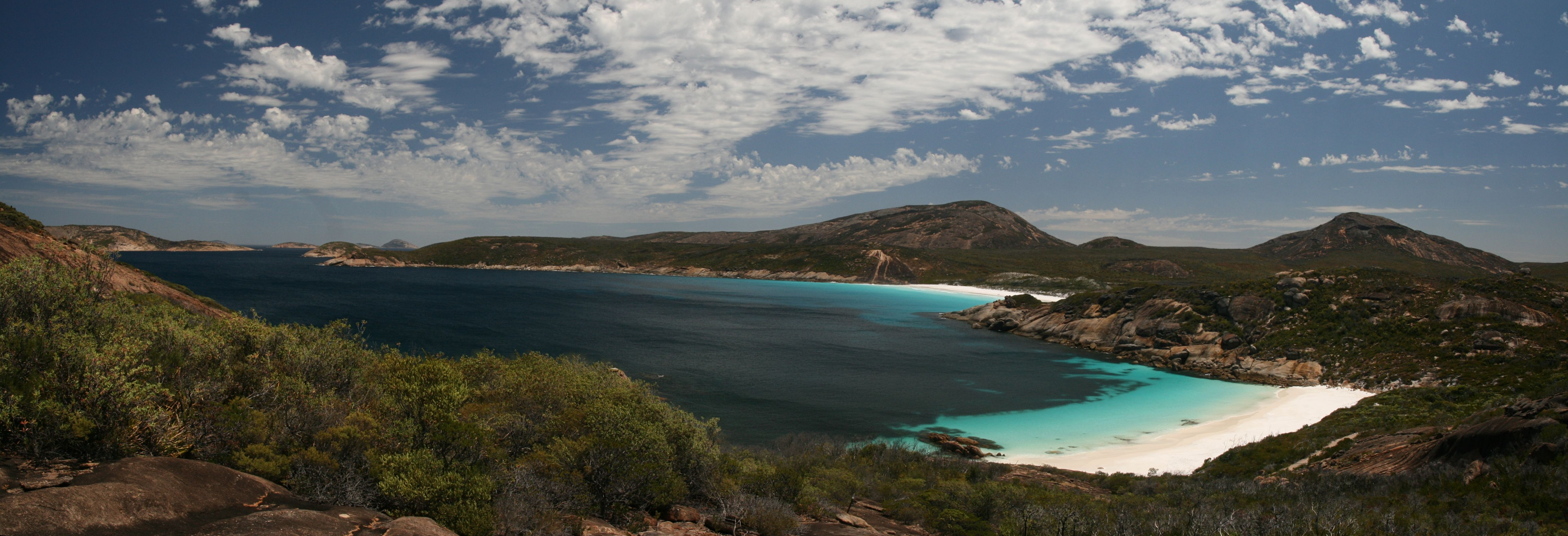
Cape Le Grande panorama

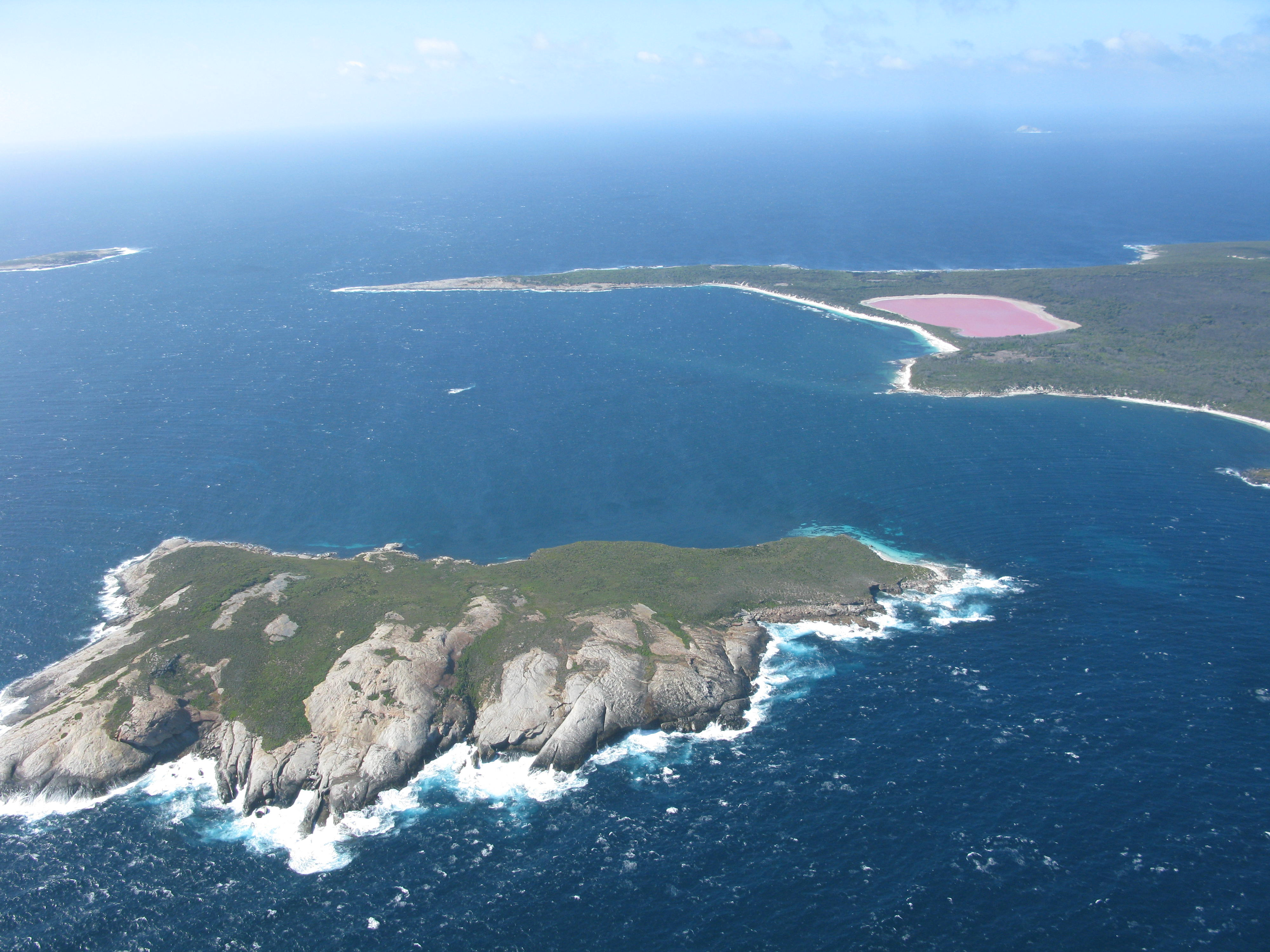
Goose Island and Middle Island, Recherche Archipelago 2011

The islands are usually considered as being either in the western group, near Esperance and Woody Island and Cape Le Grand National Park, or in the eastern group where Middle Island is most prominent, near Cape Arid National Park. Some surveys of the archipelago go further than the eastern and western distinction and consider groupings around named islands, such as the Woody Group and the Remark Group.

Part of the area is included in the bioregion described as Esperance 2 (ESP2), the 'Recherche subregion', which contains Cape Le Grand National Park at its western end, and the Cape Arid National Park at the eastern end. This area is named the Recherche Archipelago Nature Reserve.

=== Islands ===
Tour operator Don MacKenzie was granted permission to land passengers on Woody Island in 1973. The MacKenzie family built the jetty that is still used for visitors to disembark from tourist boats.

Name	Location	Area (ha)	Notes
Anvil Island	33°44′17″S 124°05′39″E	38	A haul-out site for the Australian sea lion.
Barrier Island	33°58′48″S 123°08′13″E	10	Composed of gneiss and providing protection for some of the beaches near Cape Arid. Also a haul-out site for the Australian sea lion.
Beaumont Island	34°05′25″S 122°32′22″E	36	Possible breeding site for the Australian sea lion
Bellinger Island	33°53′09″S 123°38′36″E	38	Possible breeding site for the Australian sea lion. The schooner Mary Ann was wrecked in 1876 while anchored under the lee of the island.
Ben Island	33°54′01″S 122°45′12″E	30	Scientific research has been conducted on the island.
Boxer Island	34°00′02″S 121°40′42″E	162	A haul-out site for the Australian sea lion.
Capps Island	33°59′19″S 121°40′55″E	35	A haul-out site for the Australian sea lion.
Canning Island	33°55′05″S 121°46′20″E	16	Supports a population of 2000-3000 pairs of the white-faced storm-petrel.
Charley Island	33°55′23″S 121°52′31″E	83	Supports a small population of the bush rat.
Cooper Island	34°13′55″S 123°36′22″E	42	A breeding site for the Australian sea lion and the New Zealand fur seal.
Corbett Island	34°07′05″S 121°58′40″E	84	A haul-out site for the Australian sea lion.
Cranny Island	33°43′51″S 124°04′40″E	4	A haul-out site for the Australian sea lion.
Cull Island	33°55′22″S 121°54′07″E	68	Supports a population of 30 Cape Barren geese
Daw Island	33°50′45″S 124°08′02″E	206	A possible breeding site for the Australian sea lion. The island supports a small population of the bush rat and is the only island in the archipelago to have a quenda colony. The island is also known to be inhabited by Death Adder snakes.
Draper Island	34°11′45″S 122°29′45″E	20	A haul-out site for the Australian sea lion.
Figure of Eight Island	34°01′37″S 121°36′25″E	233	A possible breeding site for the Australian sea lion.
Finger Island	34°06′17″S 122°20′38″E		A possible breeding site for the Australian sea lion.
Forrest Island	33°54′59″S 122°42′38″E		
Frederick Island	34°04′02″S 122°00′19″E	77	Supports 500-100 pairs flesh-footed shearwater and 5000-8000 pairs white-faced storm-petrel
Glennie Island	34°05′45″S 123°06′18″E		A possible breeding site for the Australian sea lion.
Gulch Island	34°01′31″S 123°14′50″E		The granite island is approximately 2 kilometres (1 mi) in length and rises to a height of about 20 metres (66 ft). It is situated about 3 kilometres (2 mi) off-shore from the beaches west of Cape Arid.
Halfway Island	33°46′12″S 124°02′24″E		A possible breeding site for the Australian sea lion. Locally known as Ford Island.
Hasler Island	34°07′01″S 123°04′01″E		A haul-out site for the Australian sea lion.
Hastings Island	34°06′05″S 122°07′01″E		A haul-out site for the Australian sea lion.
Hector Island	34°00′00″S 121°43′01″E		A haul-out site for the Australian sea lion.
Helby Island	34°07′01″S 123°04′01″E		A haul-out site for the Australian sea lion.
High North Island	33°43′01″S 124°05′59″E		A haul-out site for the Australian sea lion.
Hood Island	34°08′34″S 122°02′53″E	131	Supports a small population of the bush rat.
Hope Island	34°04′44″S 122°09′46″E		A haul-out site for the Australian sea lion.
Hugo Island	34°08′42″S 122°19′01″E		A haul-out site for the Australian sea lion.
Kermadec Island	34°05′16″S 122°50′02″E		Also known locally as Wedge Island, a breeding site for the Australian sea lion.
Little Island	34°27′25″S 121°59′23″E		A breeding site for the Australian sea lion.
Long Island	34°02′57″S 121°57′42″E	138	Supports hundreds of flesh-footed shearwater
Lorraine Island	33°57′00″S 122°33′46″E	9	Supports 2000-3000 pairs white-faced storm-petrel
MacKenzie Island	34°12′01″S 122°06′43″E	48	A breeding site for the Australian sea lion.
Manicom Island	34°07′01″S 123°01′58″E		A haul-out site for the Australian sea lion.
Middle Island	34°05′58″S 123°11′23″E	1080	There have been historical activities on the island. It is the largest island in the archipelago. It was named by d'Entrecasteaux. Matthew Flinders visited in January 1802 and climbed the 185 metres (607 ft) peak (subsequently named Flinders Peak) to survey the surrounding islands. The island contains a pink lake, Lake Hillier, from which John Thistle, the Investigator's master, collected some salt samples. The pirate, Black Jack Anderson, based himself on this island to launch raids on vessels making their way between Adelaide and Albany. The Belinda was wrecked off Middle Island in 1824, the SS Penguin was wrecked off the island while sheltering from a gale in 1920. The island supports a population of the tammar wallaby and was thought to be home to the bush rat based on a single skull find in the 1970s however subsequent trips in 2008 and 2011 failed to find any evidence. The island is 6.5 kilometres (4 mi) in length and approximately 9 kilometres (6 mi) off shore from Cape Arid.
Mondrain Island	34°08′14″S 122°14′45″E	810	Supports a population of Recherche rock-wallabies, black-flanked rock-wallaby and the bush rat. The highest point is Baudin Peak. (222 metres (728 ft))
Nares Island	33°56′01″S 122°35′35″E	6	Known to have 3-4 pairs of white-faced storm-petrel
New Year Island	33°51′21″S 124°07′37″E		A haul-out site for the Australian sea lion.
Nook Island	33°46′22″S 124°05′59″E		A breeding site for the Australian sea lion.
North Twin Peak Island	33°59′27″S 122°50′18″E		Supports a small population of the bush rat.
Observatory Island	33°55′27″S 121°47′31″E	101	Captains Bruni d’Entrecasteaux and Huon de Kermandec sheltered on the lee side of this island in 1792 during a wild storm. While their ships, Le Recherche and L’Esperance, were at anchor, Captain d'Entrecasteaux decided to name the bay after the first ship to enter it – L’Esperance. The island supports a colony of 20-30 pairs little penguins.
Pasley Island	34°00′39″S 123°31′55″E		Also known as Paisley Island, a possible breeding site for the Australian sea lion.
Passage Island	33°58′58″S 122°25′58″E		A haul-out site for the Australian sea lion.
Pearson Island	34°13′01″S 122°20′59″E		A haul-out site for the Australian sea lion.
Ram Island	34°01′55″S 122°08′29″E	142	Supports a colony of 300-500 pairs flesh-footed shearwater
Red Island	33°52′15″S 121°20′59″E		A haul-out site for the Australian sea lion.
Remark Island	34°03′52″S 121°59′03″E	101	Ten nests of the black-faced cormorant are known on the island
Rocky Island	34°04′58″S 120°52′01″E		A breeding site for the Australian sea lion.
Rodonia Island	33°49′58″S 123°55′01″E		A haul-out site for the Australian sea lion.
Round Island	34°06′17″S 123°53′16″E		A breeding site for the Australian sea lion.
Salisbury Island	34°21′39″S 123°33′01″E	320	A breeding ground for the Australian fur seal and the New Zealand fur seal. Also supports a population of the black-flanked rock-wallaby. the bush rat.
Sandy Hook Island	34°02′04″S 121°59′32″E	285	Flesh-footed shearwater common on this island.
Slipper Island	34°02′45″S 122°45′10″E		A possible breeding site for the Australian sea lion.
Stanley Island	34°01′02″S 123°17′27″E		Also known as Wickham Island, a breeding site for the Australian sea lion.
Tadpole Island	33°43′58″S 124°01′58″E		A haul-out site for the Australian sea lion.
Taylor Island	33°55′17″S 122°52′17″E		A breeding site for the Australian sea lion.
Termination Island	34°28′15″S 121°59′31″E		A possible breeding site for the Australian sea lion.
Tizard Island	34°01′01″S 122°40′58″E		A haul-out site for the Australian sea lion.
Westall Island	34°04′50″S 122°58′03″E	70	Supports a population of the Recherche rock-wallaby and black-flanked rock-wallaby
Wickham Island	34°01′16″S 123°17′23″E		
Wilson Island	34°06′57″S 121°59′40″E	90	Supports a population of Recherche the rock-wallaby and black-flanked rock-wallaby
Woody Island	33°57′43″S 122°00′40″E	188	The only island within the reserve with public access and usage.

== Flora and fauna ==
The area is a biodiversity hotspot with high biodiversity and a large number of species that are native to the region. The environment contains a diverse array of subtropical and temperate flora and fauna. This is partly due to the Leeuwin current that flows in an easterly direction, this warms the cold seas to over 20 °C (68 °F) in summer. Larger islands have a substrate that supports vegetation, nesting birds, and other animals. A complex marine environment is found in the surrounding waters, the benthic habitat is various densities of seagrass meadows, reefs, or bare sand.

=== Marine ===
The waters around the islands meet often steep faces of granite, the extensive reefs and other features form habitat which supports a rich diversity of marine life. This includes 263 known species of fish, 347 known species of mollusc, and over 450 types of sponge, sea grasses, and soft corals. A coral-like algae species, rhodoliths, form beds which support marine species of spiders, snails, and worms, also acting as a creche for scallops. Marine mammals associated with the islands include two species of seal, large groups of common dolphins (Delphinus delphis), and minke whales (Balaenoptera acutorostrata).

Seagrasses found at the island include: Amphibolis antarctica, Amphibolis griffithii, Halophila decipiens, Halophila ovalis, Posidonia angustifolia, Posidonia australis, Posidonia coriacea, Posidonia denhartogii, Posidonia kirkmani, Posidonia ostenfeldii, Posidonia sinuosa, Syringodium isoetifolium, and Thalassodendron pachyrhizum.

=== Terrestrial ===
The islands support populations of terrestrial flora and fauna, some of which are unique to the archipelago. New Zealand fur seal (Arctocephalus forsteri) and Australian sea-lion (Neophoca cinerea) breeding colonies are found on some islands, with haul-out sites on many. Marsupials include tammars (Macropus eugenii derbianus), a species of bandicoot (Isoodon obesulus), and two subspecies of rock wallabies (Petrogale lateralis lateralis and Petrogale lateralis hacketti). Snakes include the Recherche Island dugite (Pseudonaja affinis tanneri) on Cull Island, and the python Morelia spilota imbricata. Other reptiles include the barking gecko (Underwoodisaurus milii), ornate dragon (Ctenophorus ornatus), and the southern heath monitor (Varanus rosenbergi). Two species of frog are also found on the islands; the quacking frog Crinia georgiana and spotted-thighed frog Litoria cyclorhyncha.:

Many of the animals and plants are in refugia, where they are remote from factors that threaten mainland populations.

=== Birds ===
The archipelago has been identified by BirdLife International as an Important Bird Area (IBA) because it is the only breeding site for the western subspecies of Cape Barren goose known as the Recherche Cape Barren goose. It also supports over 1% of the world populations of flesh-footed shearwaters, sooty oystercatchers, fairy terns and, probably, white-faced storm-petrels. Rock parrots (Neophema petrophila) and red-eared firetails (Stagonopleura oculata) have also been recorded.

== Gallery ==
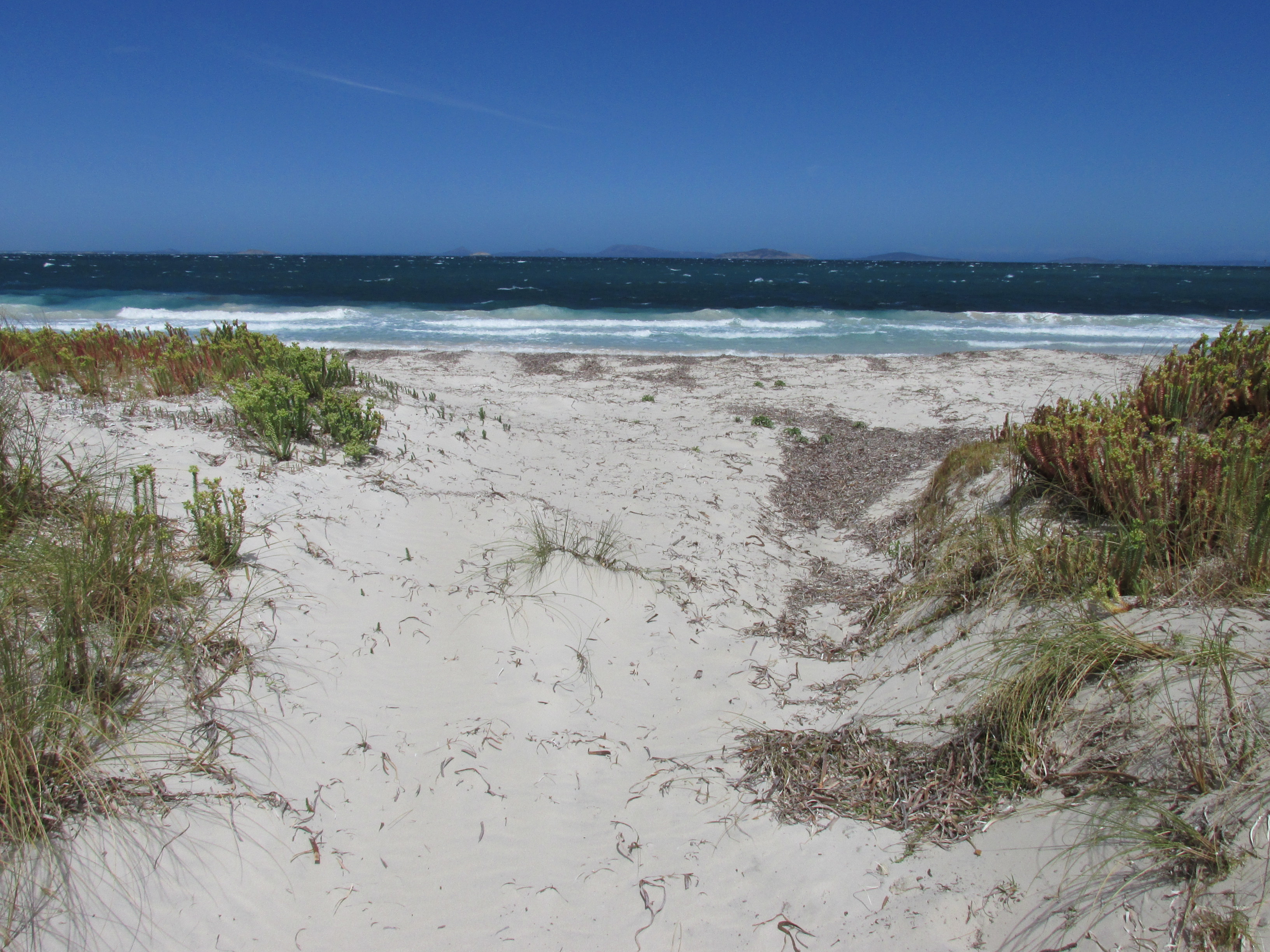
Recherche Archipelago from Castletown Beach in Esperance

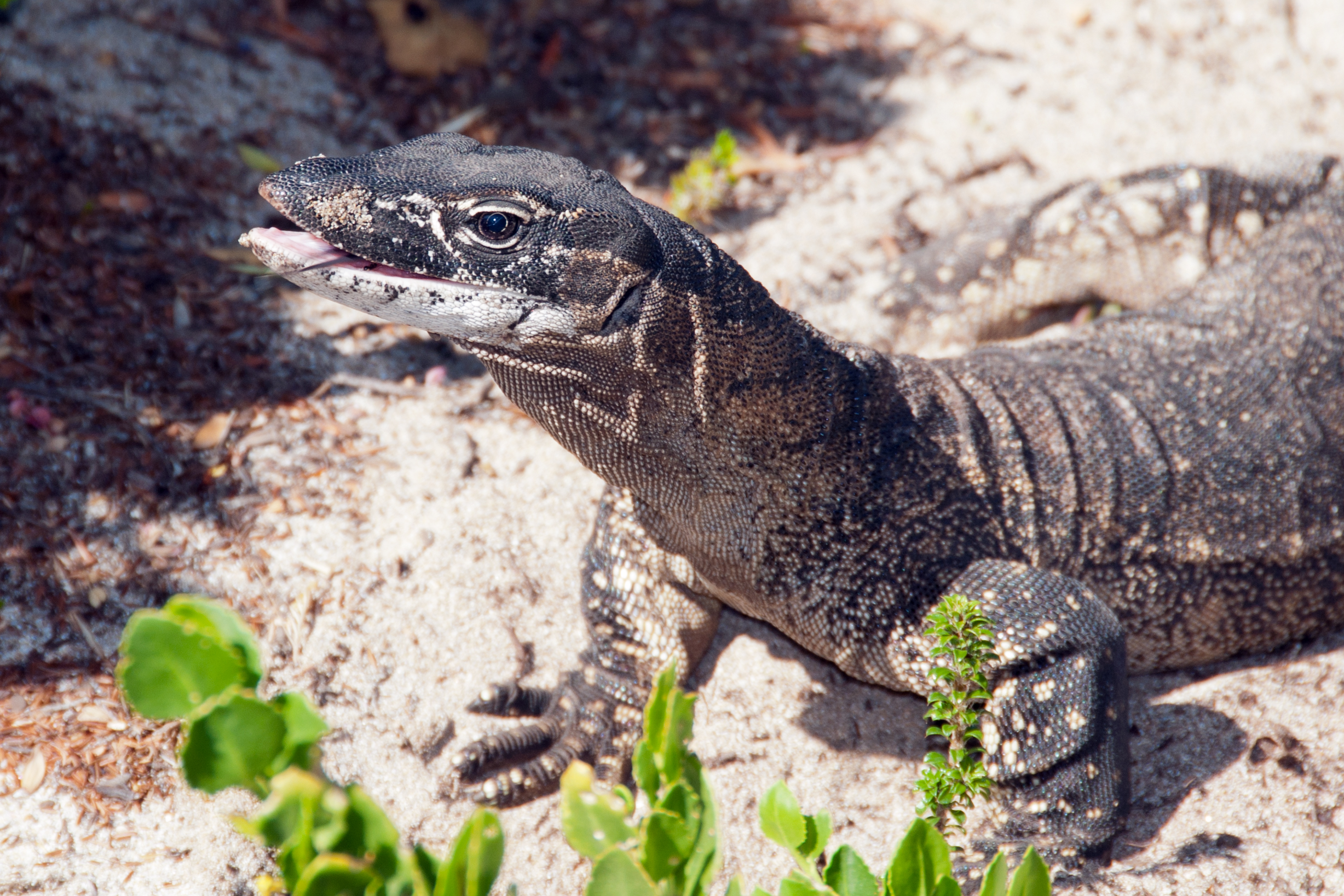
Rosenberg's monitor found on the Archipelago

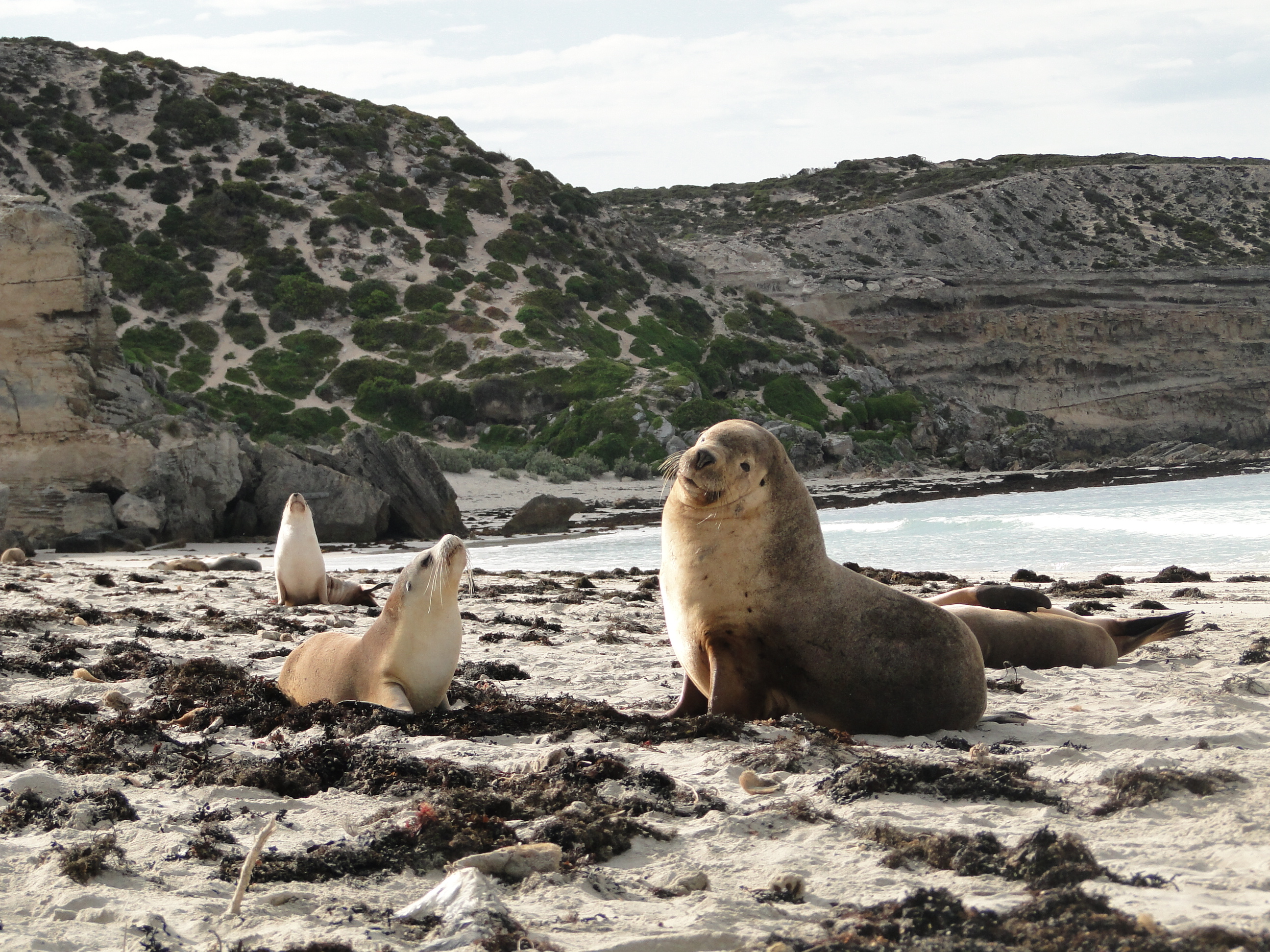
Australian sea lions are common on islands of the Archipelago

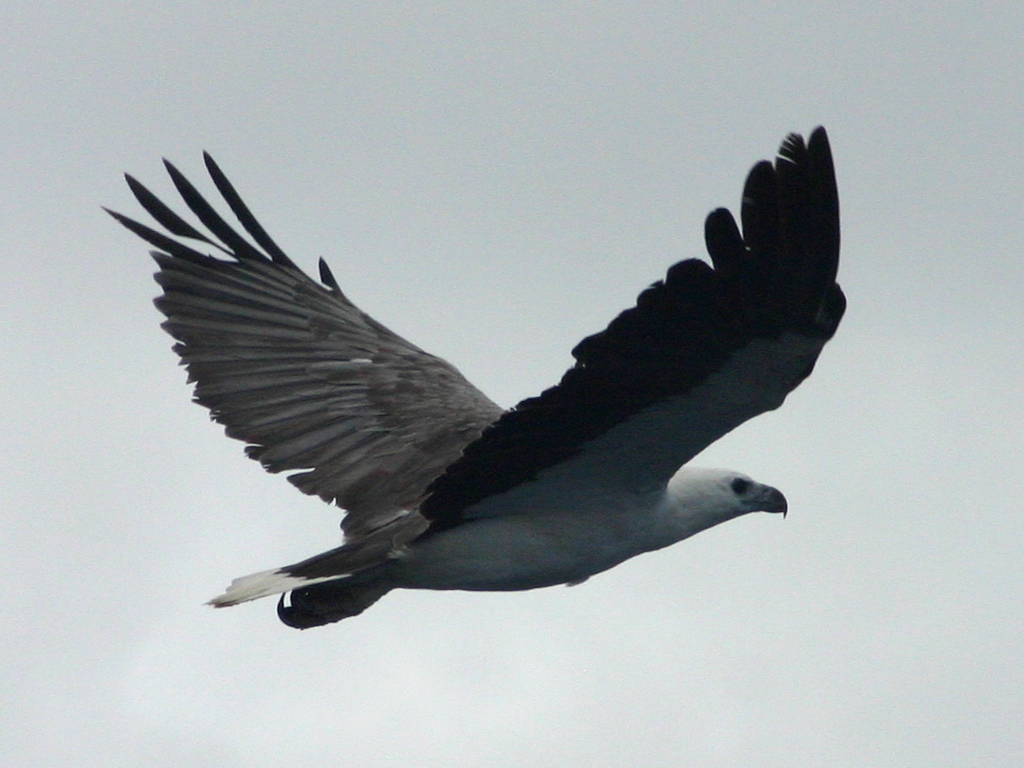
White-bellied sea eagle in flight, Recherche Archipelago, Esperance

== Early cartography ==
- Beautemps-Beaupré, C. F. (1807) Carte de l'archipel de la Recherche, situé à la partie occidentale de la terre de Nuyts, reconnu par le contre amiral Bruny-Dentrecasteaux, en décembre 1792 (an 1er de l'ere Française) Paris : Dépôt général des cartes et plans de la marine et des colonies], Battye Library Map Stack B/23/17 Scale [ca. 1:436,000] (Map of Recherche Archipelago showing track of Recherche and Espérance in December 1792). (Battye copy reduced to approximately 1:812,000 and 25 x 38.4 cm)
