= Cull Island =

Island in Western Australia

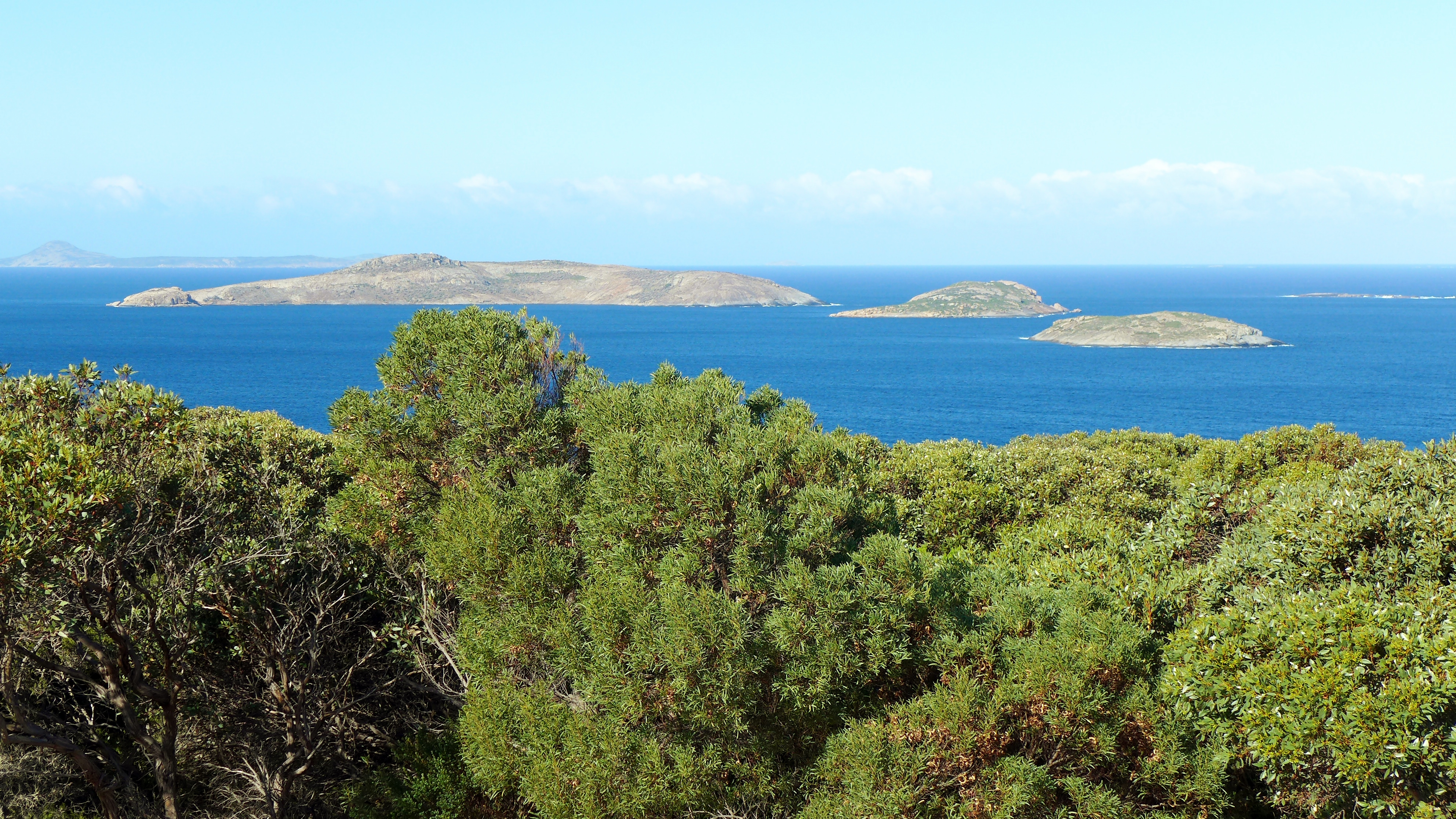
- View of Esperance Bay from Esperance. The large island at left is Cull Island.

- Location within Western Australia

Geography
- Location: Off the south coast of Western Australia
- Coordinates: 33°55′22″S 121°54′07″E
- Archipelago: Recherche Archipelago
- Area: 68 ha (170 acres)

Administration
- Australia

Demographics
- Population: Uninhabited

Cull Island, also known as Culls Island and Gull Island, is an island off the south coast of Western Australia in the Recherche Archipelago. It is located about 6.5 kilometres (4 mi) southeast of Esperance and occupies an area of 68 hectares (168 acres).

Cull Island is uninhabited but is home to a group of wild goats which roam the island. It also has a colony of little penguins and is one of the main nesting grounds for the Cape Barren goose.

An unmanned lighthouse is located in the centre of the island on a white hut about 3 metres (10 ft) high. It was installed with an acetylene-powered light in 1965 but was converted to an automatic solar-powered flashing light in 1984.

On 5 January 2020, Gary Johnson a local Esperance diver was killed by a great white shark while diving at Cull Island.

== See also ==
- List of islands of Western Australia
- List of islands of Australia
