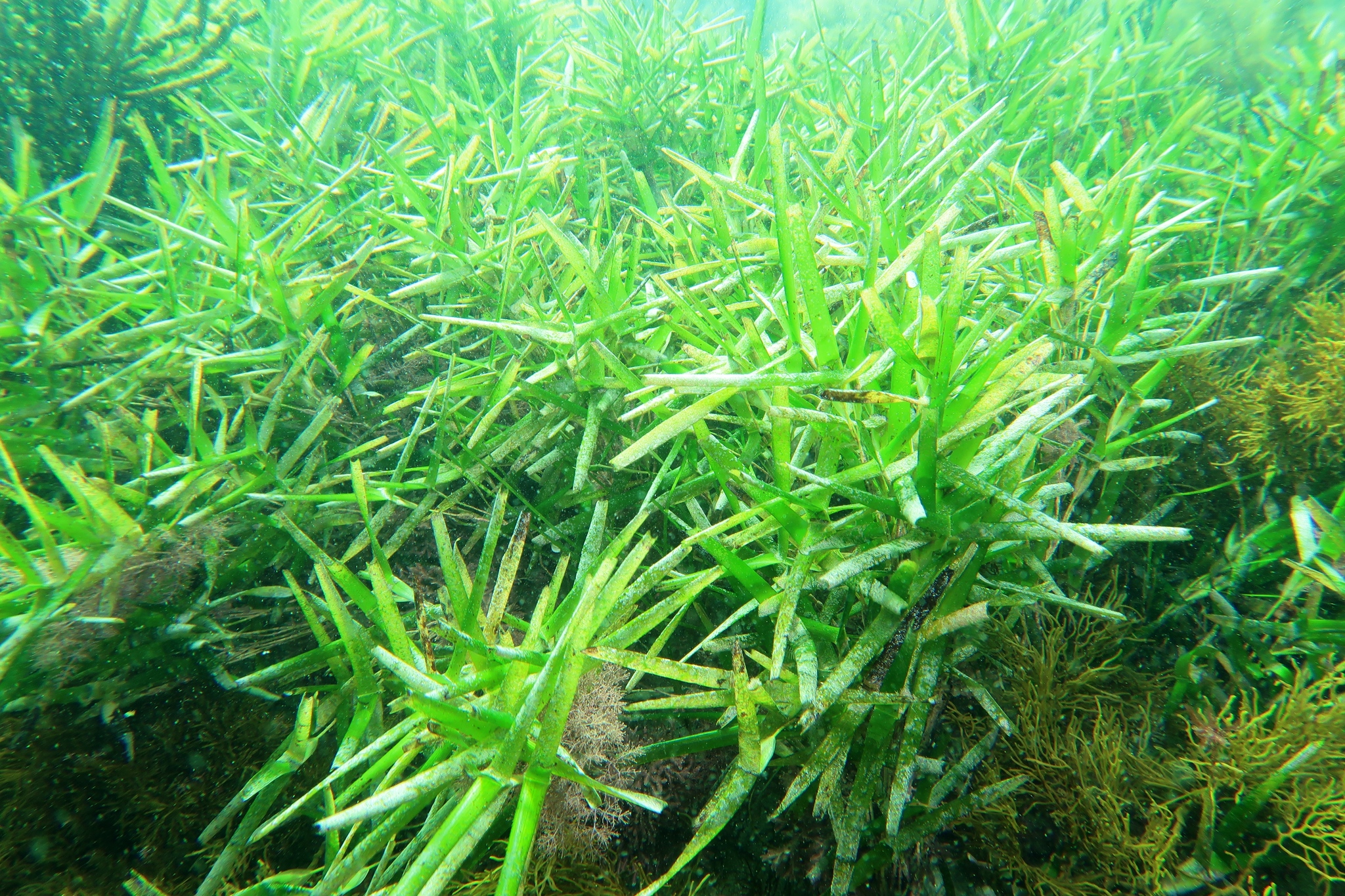
- A. griffithii in Yankalilla, Australia

Conservation status
- Least Concern (IUCN 3.1)

Scientific classification
- Kingdom: Plantae
- Clade: Tracheophytes
- Clade: Angiosperms
- Clade: Monocots
- Order: Alismatales
- Family: Cymodoceaceae
- Genus: Amphibolis
- Species: A. griffithii

Binomial name
- Amphibolis griffithii (J.M.Black) Hartog

= Amphibolis griffithii =

Species of plant

Amphibolis griffithii is a seagrass found in waters along the southwestern coasts of Western Australia, extending to Encounter Bay in South Australia.

== Etymology ==
Amphibolis griffithii is named in honour of Adelaide naturalist Hubert H.D. Griffith (1877–1958), who collected specimens of the species from Henley Beach, South Australia in November 1913.

== Description ==
A common marine herb, the rhizomatous plant forms meadows which stabilise sands; the intertwining roots and leaves protects the substrate from ocean currents. The species is perennial, bears its male and female flowers on separate plants, and produces fruit on the leaves. The plant reproduces by viviparous means, the seed germinating before leaving the plant and floating freely. The seedling forms a comb of bristles that can anchor it at the new site before the development of roots and a rhizome allow the plant to fully establish itself.

The leaves are arranged at the end of its many branches, attached in an overlapping sheath, and are bright green, perhaps with red patches. These assist in maintaining the meadows cohesion by protecting against erosion from the ocean's currents. Each leaf blade may be up to 75mm long, with a uniform width of 2.5 to 6mm, four or five of the ribbon-like leaves rise upward from the many branches. The form of the sheath, and the longer leaves, differentiate this species from its cogener Amphibolis antarctica, and it is found in rougher oceans than that species.

== Distribution ==
Found along the western coast of Australia, south of Geraldton, and along the southern coastlines to Victor Harbor, South Australia. The occurrence of Amphibolis griffithii is also recorded near island groups of Houtman Abrolhos and the Archipelago of the Recherche. The species is found in areas of fast and constant ocean currents, the rhizomes forming dense mats on soft sand substrates. It is restricted to depths less than 16 metres in its distribution range, and it is often associated with limestone or reef ecologies. The detritus is frequently found in rotting piles along the shoreline, forming a rich habitat for other plant and animal species. The distribution range is smaller than that of Amphibolis antarctica, occupying a narrower range of habitat, possibly due to less tolerance of water temperatures and salinity.

== Taxonomy ==
John McConnell Black provisionally gave this species its name in 1948, the accepted species description was published by Cornelis den Hartog in 1970.
