= Salisbury Island (Western Australia) =

Island in Western Australia

Coordinates: 34°21′39″S 123°33′01″E

Location of Salisbury Island in Western Australia

Salisbury Island is located in the Recherche Archipelago off the south coast of Western Australia.

The island occupies an area of 320 hectares (791 acres), the third largest island in the Recherche Archipelago. It is situated approximately 140 kilometres (87 mi) east of Esperance and 60 kilometres (37 mi) off the coast near the edge of the continental shelf, making it one of the southernmost islands in the archipelago.

The island is formed from a massive limestone scarp that sits atop a granite dome. Many caves are found throughout the island both above and below water.

Indigenous Australians are thought to have inhabited the island up to 18,000 years ago. Archeologists have found ancient artefacts on the island such as stone blades, lizard traps, axe heads, grinding stones and granite watering holes. The objects are believed to be 5,000 to 18,000 years old from a time when many of the islands were joined to the mainland.

Rodondo was thought to be wrecked on Polloch Reef off Salisbury Island in 1895.

The island is a breeding ground for the Australian fur seal and the New Zealand fur seal and also supports a population of the black-flanked rock-wallaby and the bush rat.

In the waters surrounding the island great white sharks are known to congregate in large numbers, preying on the seals and the many schools of fish that live among the limestone reefs and granite outcrops.
