= Black Jack Anderson =

American pirate active in Australia

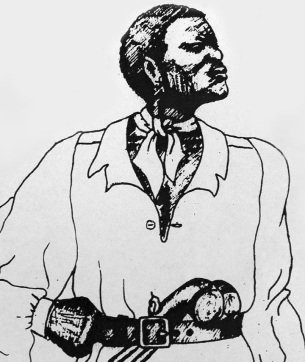
A sketch of Black Jack Anderson which appeared in the Perth Gazette in 1842

John "Black Jack" Anderson (died 1837) was an African-American sealer and pirate active in the Recherche Archipelago off the south coast of Western Australia.

== Arrival in Western Australia ==
Anderson arrived in Western Australia's Recherche Archipelago on the cutter Mountaineer in 1835 from Kangaroo Island in what was to become South Australia, setting up base on Middle Island (near modern day Esperance).

== Piracy ==
Anderson and his fellows established an encampment on Middle Island as it was one of the few islands with a source of fresh water. The archipelago was heavily populated by Australian sea lions and New Zealand fur seals, and Anderson's band soon enriched themselves by trading furs to settlements along the coast; they are noted as visiting Kangaroo Island and the Althorpe Islands in South Australia. They supplemented their sealing income by robbing vessels travelling between Western Australia and the east coast colonies. They are also said to have murdered Indigenous Kaurna men and abducted women to take as sex slaves. The Recherche Archipelago was treacherous and uncharted, making it an ideal hideout for the pirates.

In September 1834 Anderson and another black man, John Bathurst, arrived at Kangaroo Island from Long Island and clashed with whalers and Aboriginals.

According to an 1842 report complaining about the lawlessness of sealers:

One of the most daring of these people was a man of color of the name of Anderson, and lawless as these men were, they looked up to him with a sort of dread. Anderson usually carried a brace of pistols about him, knowing that he held his life by a very precarious tenure. By persevering exertions he had amassed a considerable sum of money, and usually kept one or two black women to attend on him and minister to his wants, when not engaged in sealing.

=== Death ===
Anderson was eventually murdered by his fellow pirates, and is thought to be buried somewhere on Middle Island. According to a contemporary report:

They got quite disgusted with Anderson's harshness, and determined to remove him, but were puzzled how to accomplish it, as he was a stout, powerful man, and being armed was always on his guard. At last, one day when he was asleep in the tent, one of them entered and, taking deliberate aim, blew his brains out. The corpse was thrown into a hole, and covered over with earth, they then shared the booty, and killed the native woman [he was with] in case she should afterwards tell the tale.

The reputation of the island as a lawless place continued for some time; in 1848 The Inquirer called it "the resort of a set of lawless desperadoes, composed of runaway convicts, sealers, etc."

== In fiction ==
- Skins, by Sarah Hay - winner of the 2001 The Australian/Vogel Literary Award
- Black Jack Anderson: Australia's Most Notorious Pirate, by Elaine Forrestal
- Black Anderson A 1929 story by "Polygon" in The West Australian
