= Woody Island (Western Australia) =

Island in Western Australia

Woody Island Nature Reserve
- IUCN category Ia (strict nature reserve)
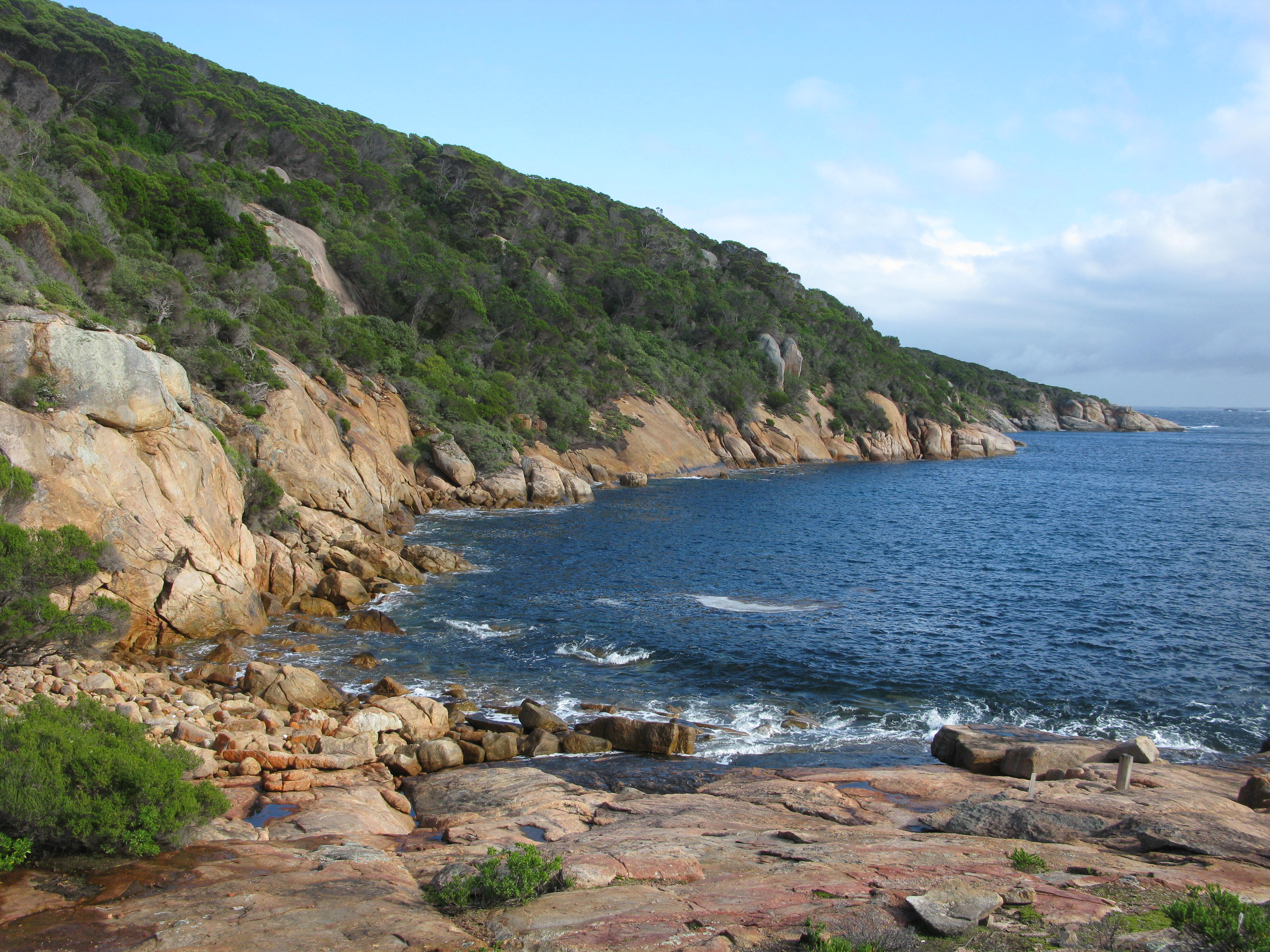
- Skinny Dip Bay on Woody Island Nature Reserve in August 2012

- Location within Western Australia
- Location: Western Australia
- Nearest city: Esperance
- Coordinates: 33°57′43.45″S 122°00′43.74″E
- Area: 2.4 km^{2} (0.93 sq mi)
- Visitors: 16000 (in 2003-04)
- Governing body: Department of Parks and Wildlife

Woody Island is an island off the south coast in the Goldfields-Esperance region of Western Australia.

== Location and size ==
The island located 15 kilometres (9 mi) from the town of Esperance. The island is part of the Recherche Archipelago and is listed as a nature reserve. It is about 1.5 kilometres (0.93 mi) in length with a total area of 240 hectares (593 acres).

== History ==
The island was being used by settlers to graze sheep and collect wood since before 1896 with goods being transported to Esperance for sale.

Sheep continued to be grazed on the island until 1954 when the Recherche Archipelago was declared a Nature Reserve.

Woody Island is the only island of the archipelago that is open to visitors, it is accessible by daily island cruises and has accommodation available. Tour operator, Dan MacKenzie, was granted permission to land passengers on the island in 1973. The MacKenzie family built the jetty on the island that was used for visitors to disembark from tourist boats. Since then a new jetty has been constructed to accommodate larger boats, with the older jetty still visible on the opposite side of the cove.

A license to operate overnight tourism on Woody Island was granted to the MacKenzies in 1985.

A A$500,000 visitor centre was opened on the island in 1999.

Over 16,000 tourists visit the island each year.

== Facilities ==
Facilities on the island include an interpretive centre, a cafe, a swimming platform with a slide and a snorkelling trail. Woody Island received over 16,000 visitors in 2003/2004.

== Flora ==
The name of the island is derived from all of the trees that grow there. The island has a diverse flora for its size with 7 species of carnations and sedges, 20 species of daises, 12 grass species, 11 myrtle species, 9 species of peas and wattles, 4 species of trigger plants, 3 saltbush species of saltbush and 2 species of hakeas.

There are five species of Acacia including Acacia conniana and Acacia acuminata. Other large shrubs and trees found on the island include; Callitris preissii, Calothamnus quadrifidus, Eucalyptus conferruminata, Eucalyptus cornuta, Hakea clavata, Melaleuca elliptica, Paraserianthes lophantha and Taxandria marginata.

Flowers such as the sticky tailflower Anthocercis viscosa subsp caudata, Astartea fascicularis, Centaurium spicatum and Billardiera fusiformis are found amongst outcrops of granite.
