= Wickham Island (Recherche Archipelago) =

Island in Western Australia

Coordinates: 34°01′16″S 123°17′23″E

Wickham Island is located in the Recherche Archipelago off the south coast of Western Australia.
