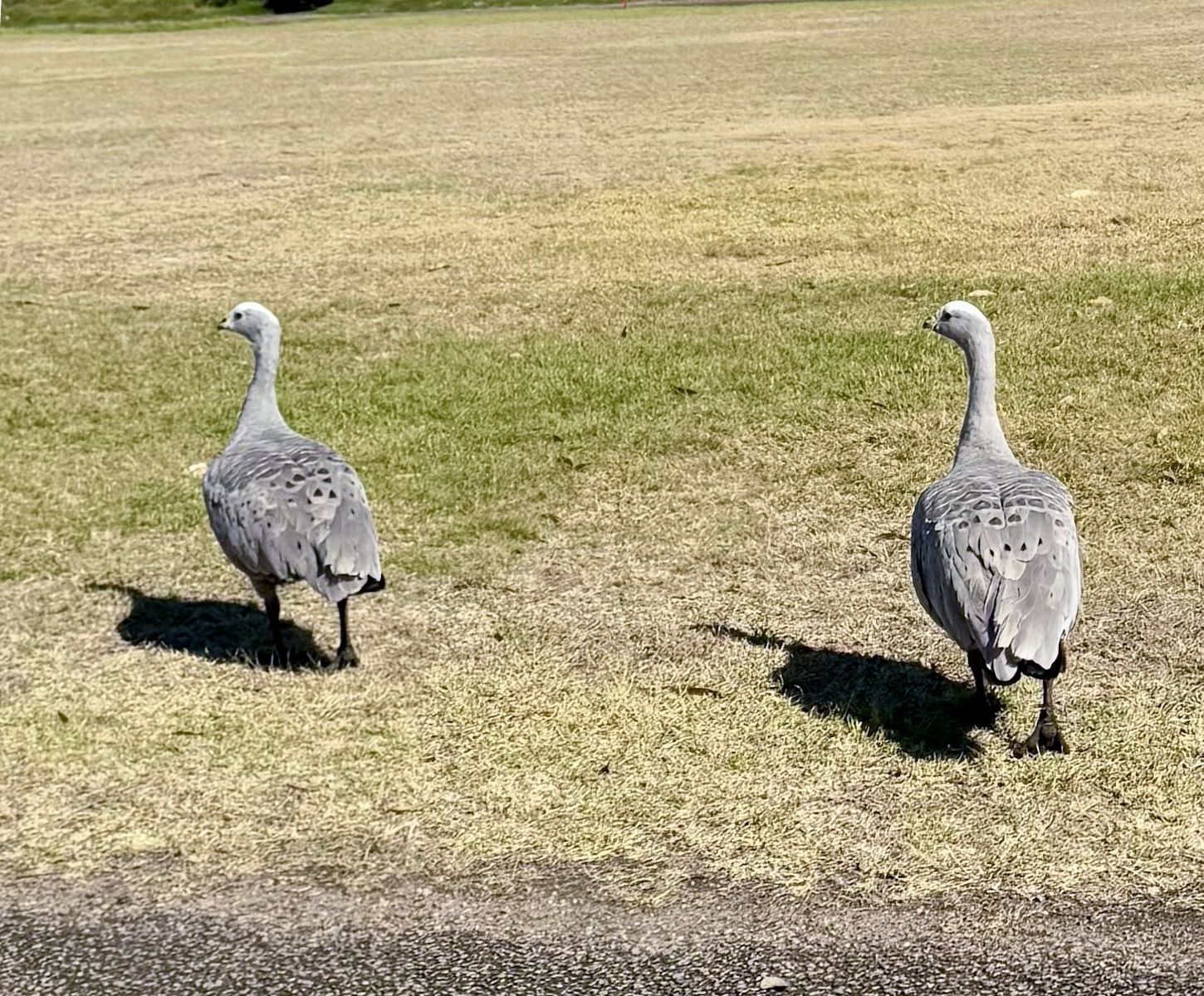
- Cereopsis novaehollandiae grisea near Pink Lake, Western Australia

Conservation status
- Vulnerable (EPBC Act)

Scientific classification
- Kingdom: Animalia
- Phylum: Chordata
- Class: Aves
- Order: Anseriformes
- Family: Anatidae
- Genus: Cereopsis
- Species: C. novaehollandiae
- Subspecies: C. n. grisea

Trinomial name
- Cereopsis novaehollandiae grisea Vieillot, 1818

= Cereopsis novaehollandiae grisea =

Subspecies of bird

The Recherche Cape Barren goose (Cereopsis novaehollandiae grisea) is large grazing bird found along the southern coast of Western Australia. It is a subspecies of the Cape Barren goose, the other subspecies of which inhabits islands and coastal regions of Bass Strait in south-eastern Australia. It is distinguished by its larger size and variant colouring.

== Distribution and habitat ==
The subspecies is found on the beaches, pasture, rocky areas, and islands of the Recherche Archipelago, which is its only breeding site. It also visits Pink Lake and Red islet. The Cape Arid, Stokes, and Cape Le Grand National Parks are also occupied in summer months.

== Behaviour ==
The geese feed by grazing and rarely swim. Nesting takes place mainly on the larger scrub-covered islands of the Archipelago, notably Cull Island.

== Status and conservation ==
Historically the population of the western subspecies was about 1000 individuals, declining in the early 1990s, with the current population considered stable. Its relative rarity of the subspecies makes it vulnerable to extinction.
