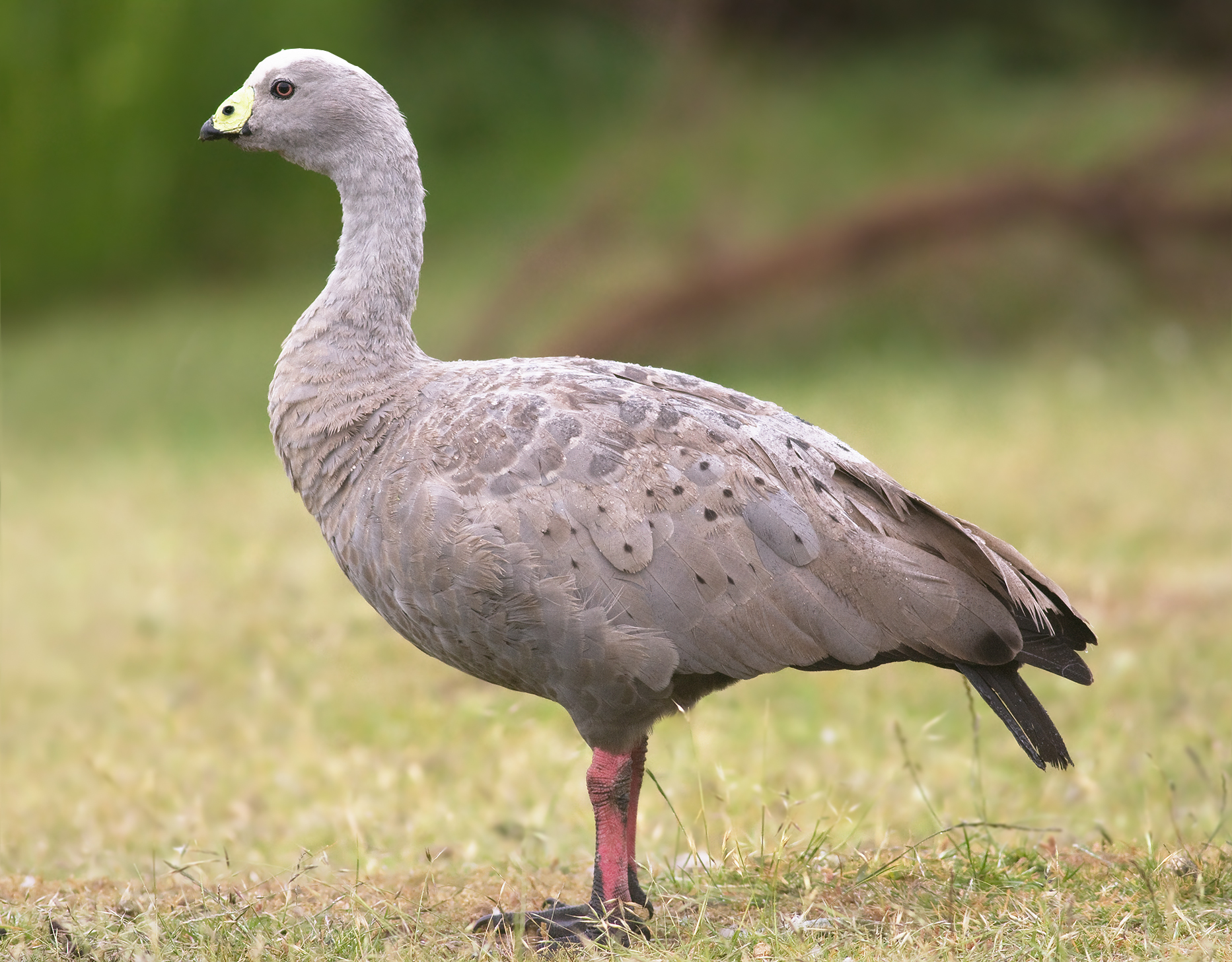

Conservation status
- Least Concern (IUCN 3.1)

Scientific classification
- Kingdom: Animalia
- Phylum: Chordata
- Class: Aves
- Order: Anseriformes
- Family: Anatidae
- Subfamily: Anserinae
- Genus: Cereopsis; Latham, 1801
- Species: C. novaehollandiae

Binomial name
- Cereopsis novaehollandiae Latham, 1801

Subspecies
- C. n. novaehollandiae Latham, 1801; C. n. grisea (Vieillot, 1818)
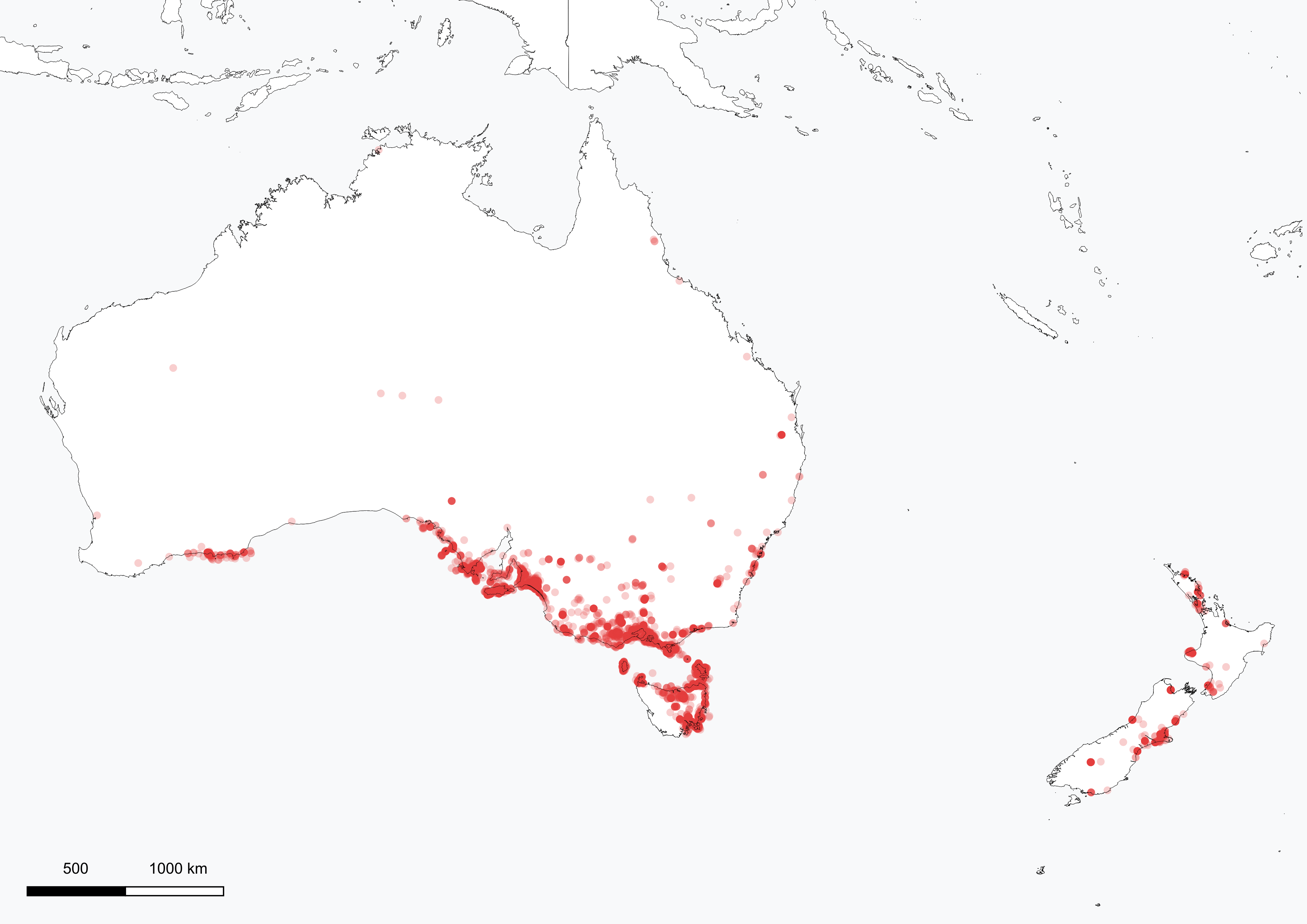
- Species distribution

= Cape Barren goose =

Species of bird native to southern Australia

The Cape Barren goose (Cereopsis novaehollandiae), sometimes also known as the pig goose, is a species of goose endemic to southern Australia. It is a distinctive large, grey bird that is mostly terrestrial and is not closely related to other extant members of the subfamily Anserinae.

== Taxonomy and history ==
The Indigenous Jardwadjali people of western Victoria refer to this species as toolka. The Noongar people of south-western Western Australia use the name bibib.

The common name "Cape Barren goose" was first ascribed to this species by shipwreck survivors in 1797. When Sydney Cove was wrecked off Preservation Island, south of Cape Barren Island, the sailors who survived the wreck used the geese as one of few sources of food on the island, and named it after Cape Barren, which was the name of the south-eastern tip of the island at that time, named by Tobias Furneaux in 1773.

The Cape Barren goose was first formally described by English ornithologist John Latham in 1801 as Cereopsis N. Hollandiae. The species had been earlier reported from the Bass Strait by George Bass and Matthew Flinders in 1798, who referred to it as a "Brent or Barnacle Goose".

The taxonomic placement of this species is not yet fully resolved. It is now generally recognised as being a member of the subfamily Anserinae, however, it has also been associated with Tadorninae. When placed within Anserinae it may be considered a member of the tribe Anserini (alongside Anser and Branta) or placed in its own tribe, Cereopsini. It is the only living representative of Cereopsini, however, fossil relatives of the Cape Barren goose are known from New Zealand and South America.

Two subspecies of Cape Barren goose are currently recognised:

- Cereopsis novaehollandiae novaehollandiae (Latham, 1801) – south-eastern Australia (southern Victoria, eastern South Australia, Tasmania, and Bass Strait islands)
- Cereopsis novaehollandiae grisea (Vieillot, 1818) – south-western Australia (Recherche Archipelago and adjacent coast of mainland Western Australia)

== Description ==
Adult Cape Barren geese are large birds, typically measuring 75–100 cm (30–39 in) long and weighing between 3.7–5.2 kg (8.2–11.5 lb), with males generally being larger than females. The plumage is mostly pale grey with a slight brown tint. The head is somewhat small in proportion to the body and mostly grey in colour, save for a pale whitish patch on the forehead and crown. The bill is short, measuring 56–63 mm (2.2–2.5 in) in length, triangular in shape and black in colour with a prominent pale yellow-green cere covering more than half the length of the bill. Feathers on the breast and back have pale margins, while the upperwing coverts and scapular feathers each have a brownish grey spot near the tip. The flight feathers are grey with black tips, with the black extending to cover the distal half of the outer primaries, giving the appearance of a dark trailing edge to the wings when in flight. The tail feathers are black, and the legs are pink with black feet.

Newly-hatched goslings are white with broad, dark stripes and a dark cere. Older juveniles are a paler grey with heavier spotting on the wings and scapular feathers than adults. The cere turns a light yellow-green colour at around 70 days old, with juveniles molting into adult plumage at around 6 months old.

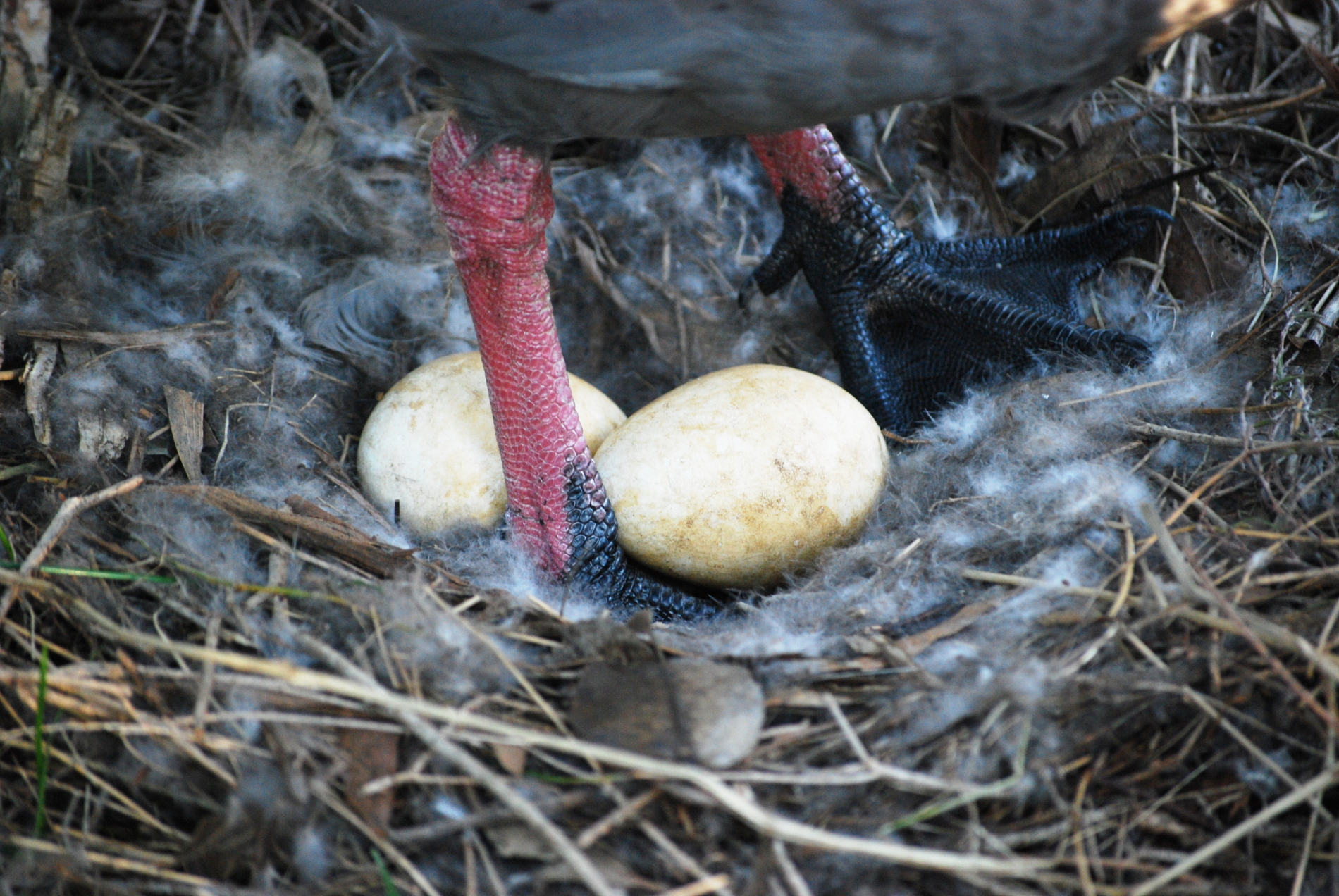
Nest with eggs, Cleland Wildlife Park

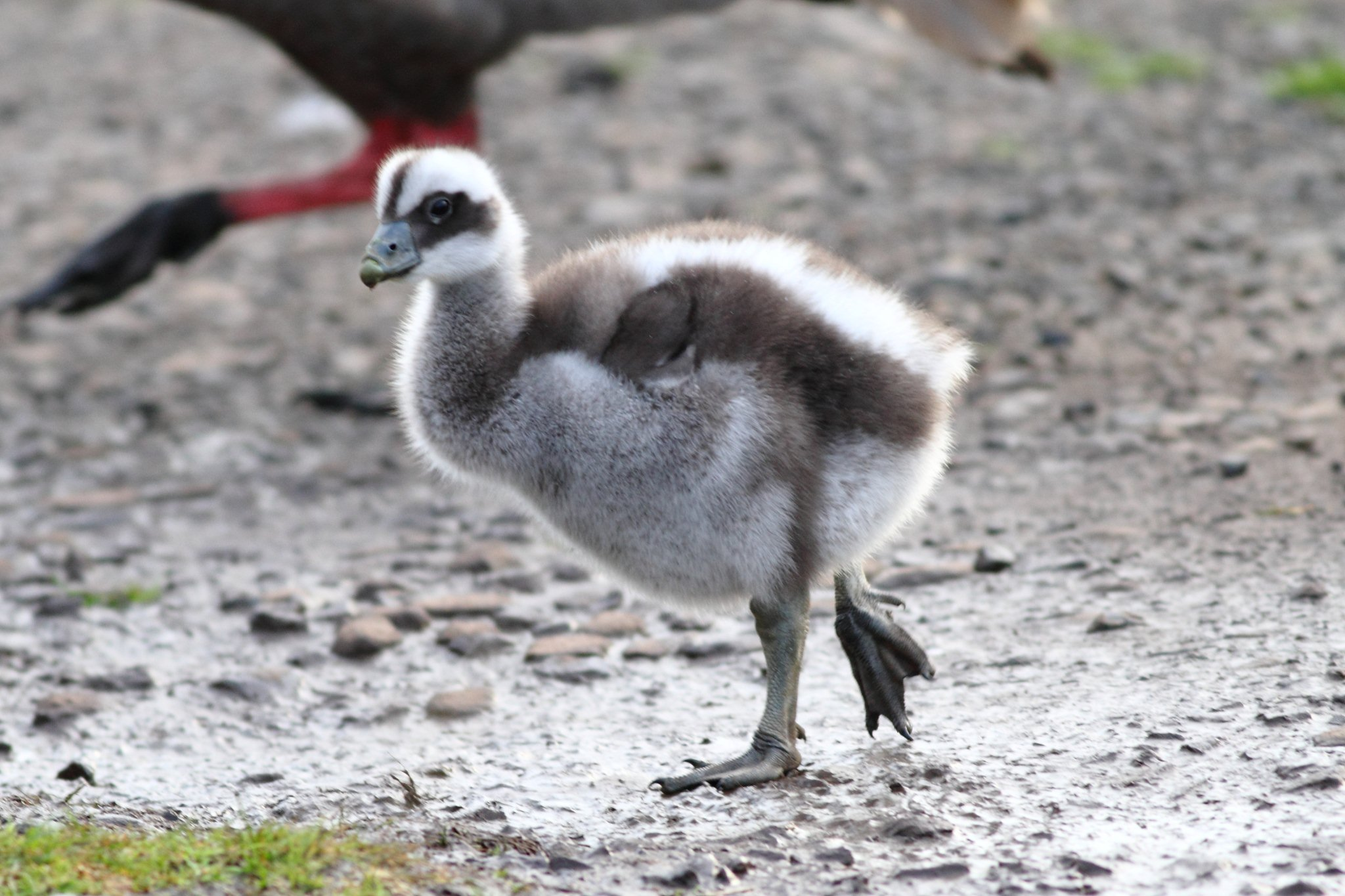
Gosling, Phillip Island

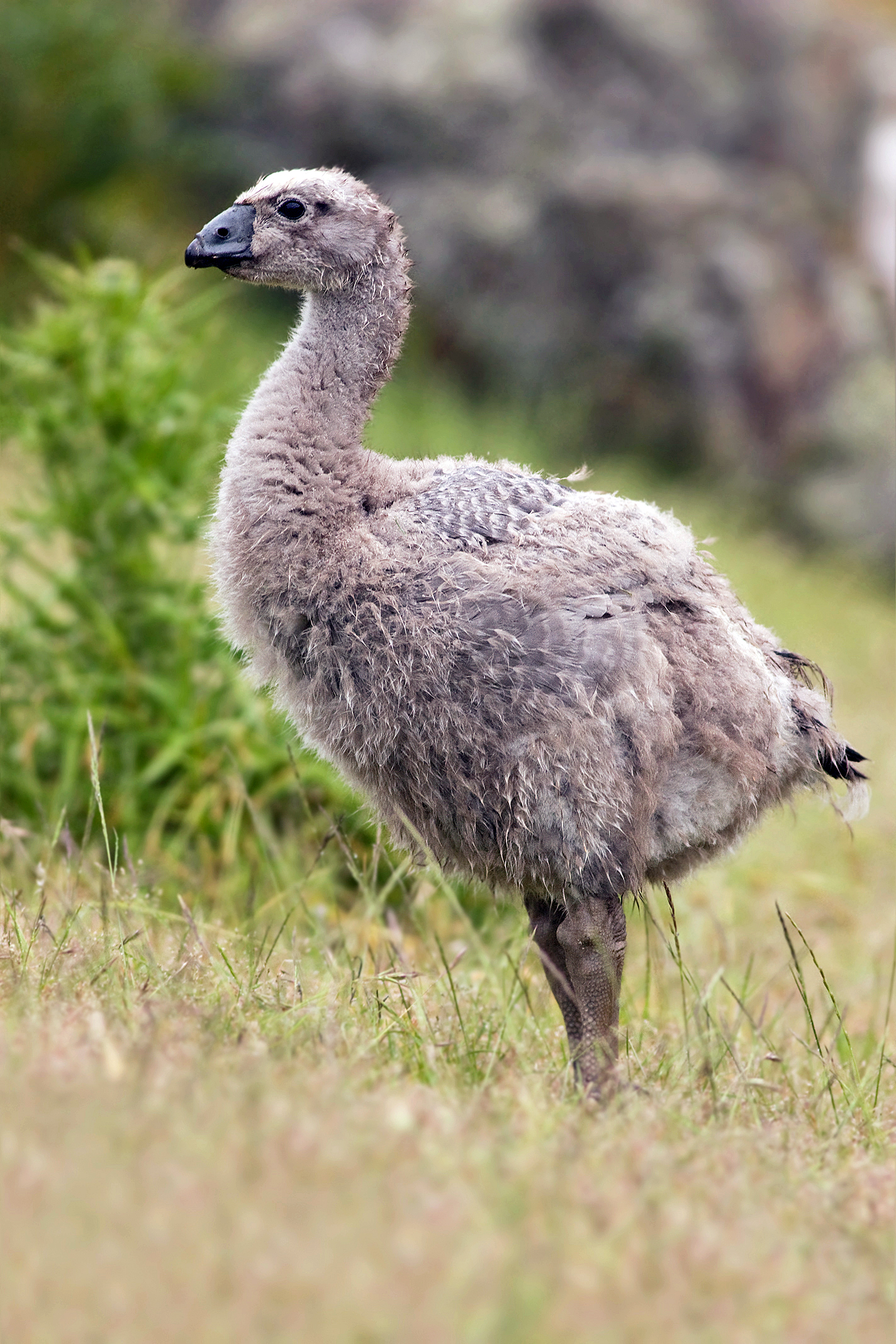
Juvenile, Maria Island

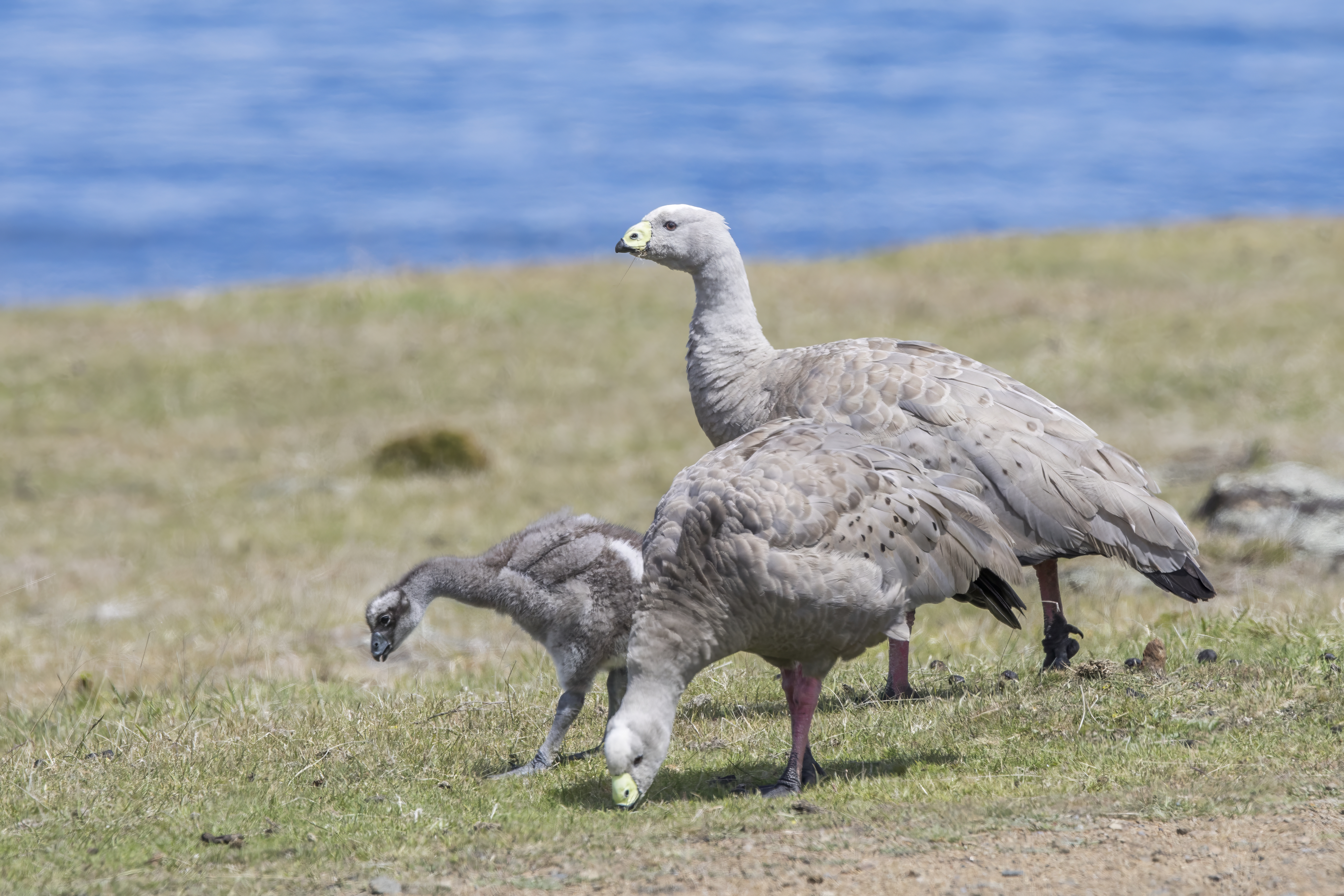
Pair with juvenile, Maria Island

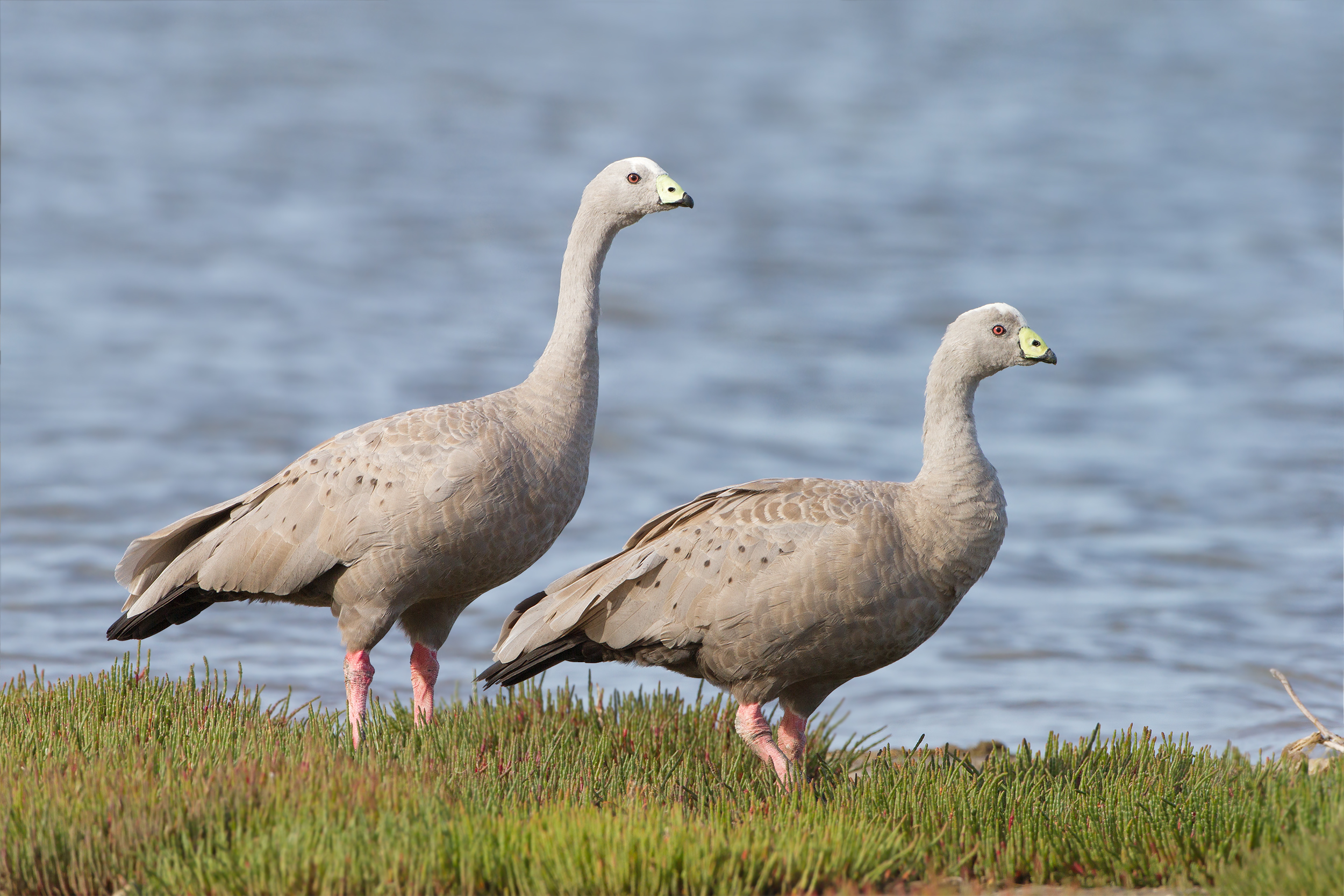
Pair, Orielton Lagoon

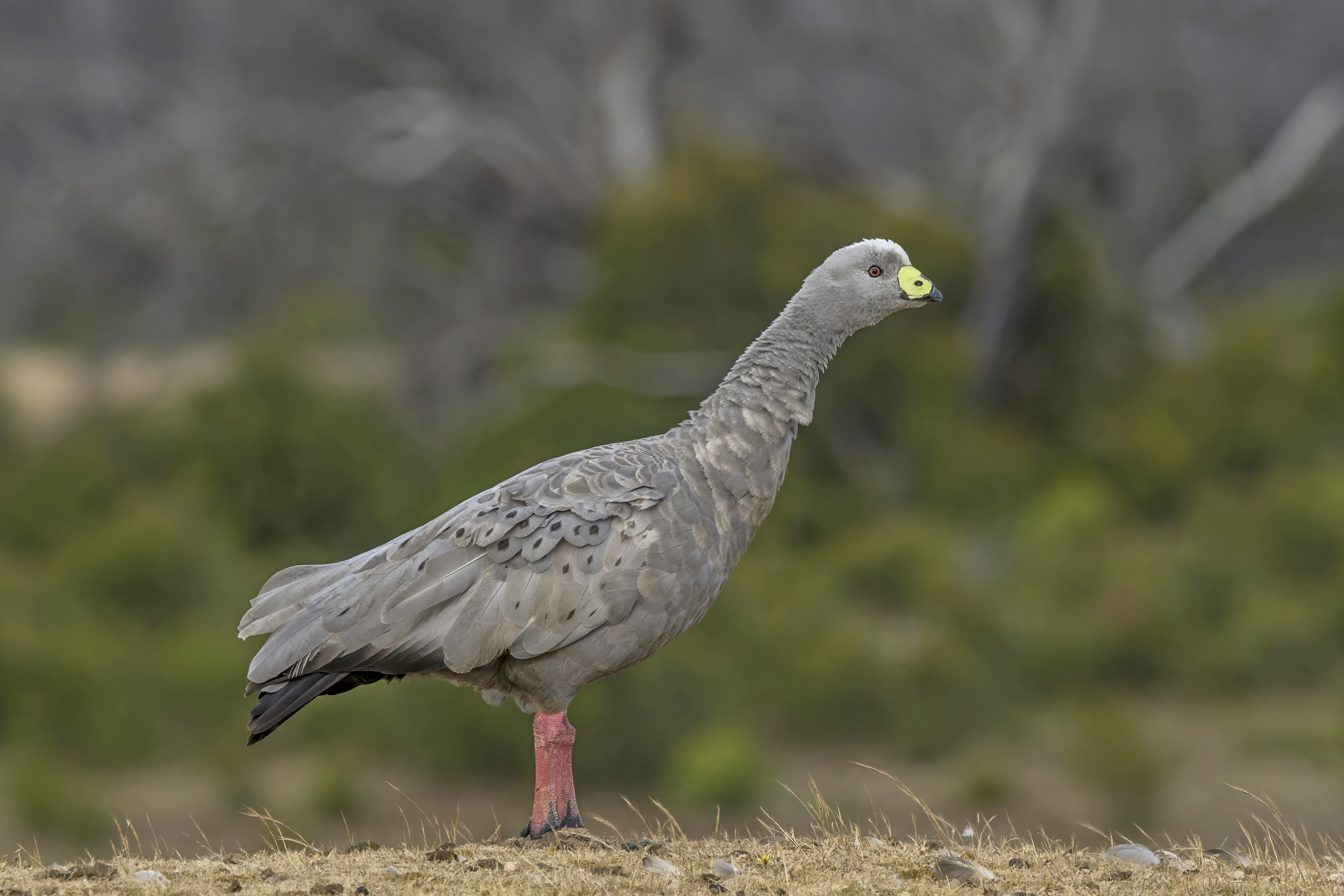
Adult, Kangaroo Island

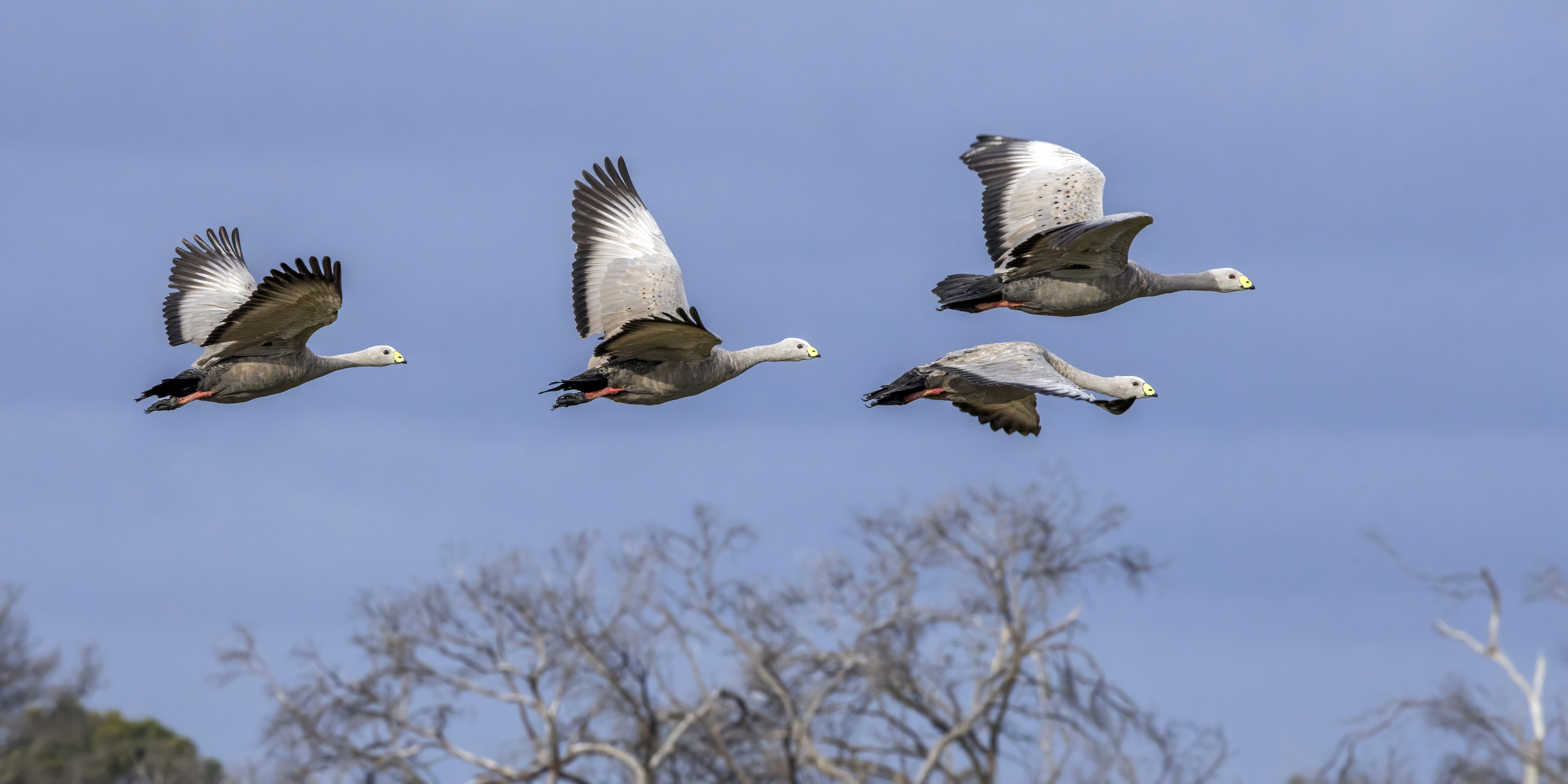
Adults in flight, Kangaroo Island

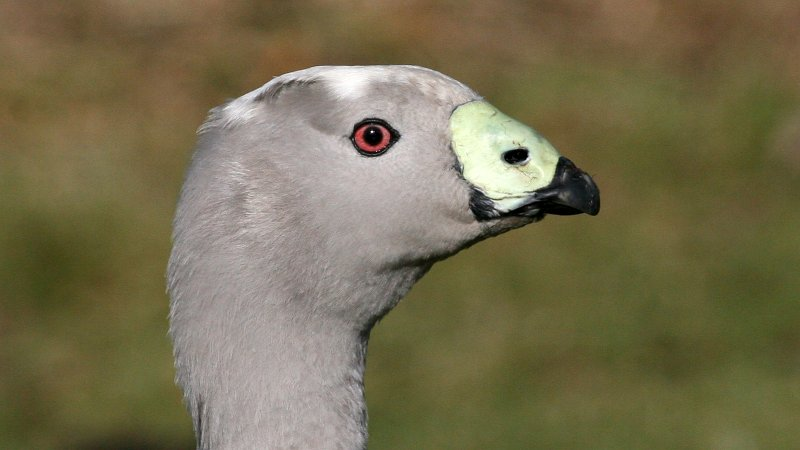
Head of adult, showing distinct bill

== Behaviour ==
Cape Barren geese are largely terrestrial, only occasionally swimming. They predominantly graze on grasses, sedges, legumes, herbs, and succulents. Their diet may include plants such as Poa poiformis, Disphyma australe, Myoporum insulare, and species of Trifolium and Juncus.

Males can produce a rapid, high-pitched honking call, often during takeoff or in flight. Both sexes make low, pig-like grunting sounds and hisses when alarmed. Goslings produce whistling distress calls.

Cape Barren geese are monogamous and typically mate for life. After mating, the pair will perform a "triumph ceremony" in which they raise and lower their heads while facing each other and calling loudly. Pairs establish territories in autumn and breeding occurs in winter.

Pairs may nest singly or in loose colonies. The nest is a shallow hollow lined with vegetation and down, usually constructed amongst tussock grass, rocks, or bushes. The nest is mainly constructed by the male but lined by the female. The female typically lays four to five creamy white eggs at one-to-three-day intervals. The eggs are incubated only by the female over a period of 34–37 days. The female leaves the nest for only a few minutes each day, and may lose up to 1 kg (2.2 lb) or 20% of her body weight during this period. All eggs in the nest hatch within a few hours of each other. Both parents care for the young once hatched.

Cape Barren geese are capable of drinking salt and brackish water, which allows them to remain on offshore islands year-round.

== Range and habitat ==
A previous decline in numbers appears to have been reversed as birds in the east at least have adapted to feeding on agricultural land. The breeding areas are grassy islands off the Australian coast, where this species nests on the ground. Breeding pairs are strongly territorial. It bears captivity well, quite readily breeding in confinement if large enough paddocks are provided.

In Australia, 19th-century explorers named a number of islands "Goose Island" due to the species' presence there.

The geese were introduced into New Zealand unsuccessfully at least three times between 1869 and 1874. The only successful introduction instance in the region was in 1914–15 at Lake Hāwea and Lake Wānaka which resulted in a small breeding population that persisted until 1946. A few geese were introduced near Christchurch, New Zealand, where the population persists.

In 1968, a small number of geese were introduced to Maria Island.
