= Salisbury Island (California) =

Island in California

- Location within Sacramento-San Joaquin River Delta Location within California

Geography
- Location: California
- Coordinates: 37°51′00″N 121°32′13″W
- Adjacent to: Old River
- Area: 20 acres (8.1 ha)

Administration
- United States
- State: California
- County: Contra Costa

Salisbury Island (also known as Salsbury Island) is an island in the Old River, in the Sacramento–San Joaquin River Delta. It is named after its original owner, tugboat operator Leslie Salsbury, who purchased it in 1945. It is in Contra Costa County, in northern California. Its coordinates are 37°51′00″N 121°32′13″W.
