= Gulch Island (Western Australia) =

Island in Western Australia

Coordinates: 34°01′31″S 123°14′50″E

Gulch Island is located in the Goldfields-Esperance region of Western Australia.

The island is approximately 2 kilometres (1.2 mi) in length and rises to a height of about 20 metres (66 ft). It is situated about 3 kilometres (1.9 mi) off-shore from the beaches west of Cape Arid. Composed of granite, the island is part of the group of islands, islets, and rocks that make up the Recherche Archipelago.
