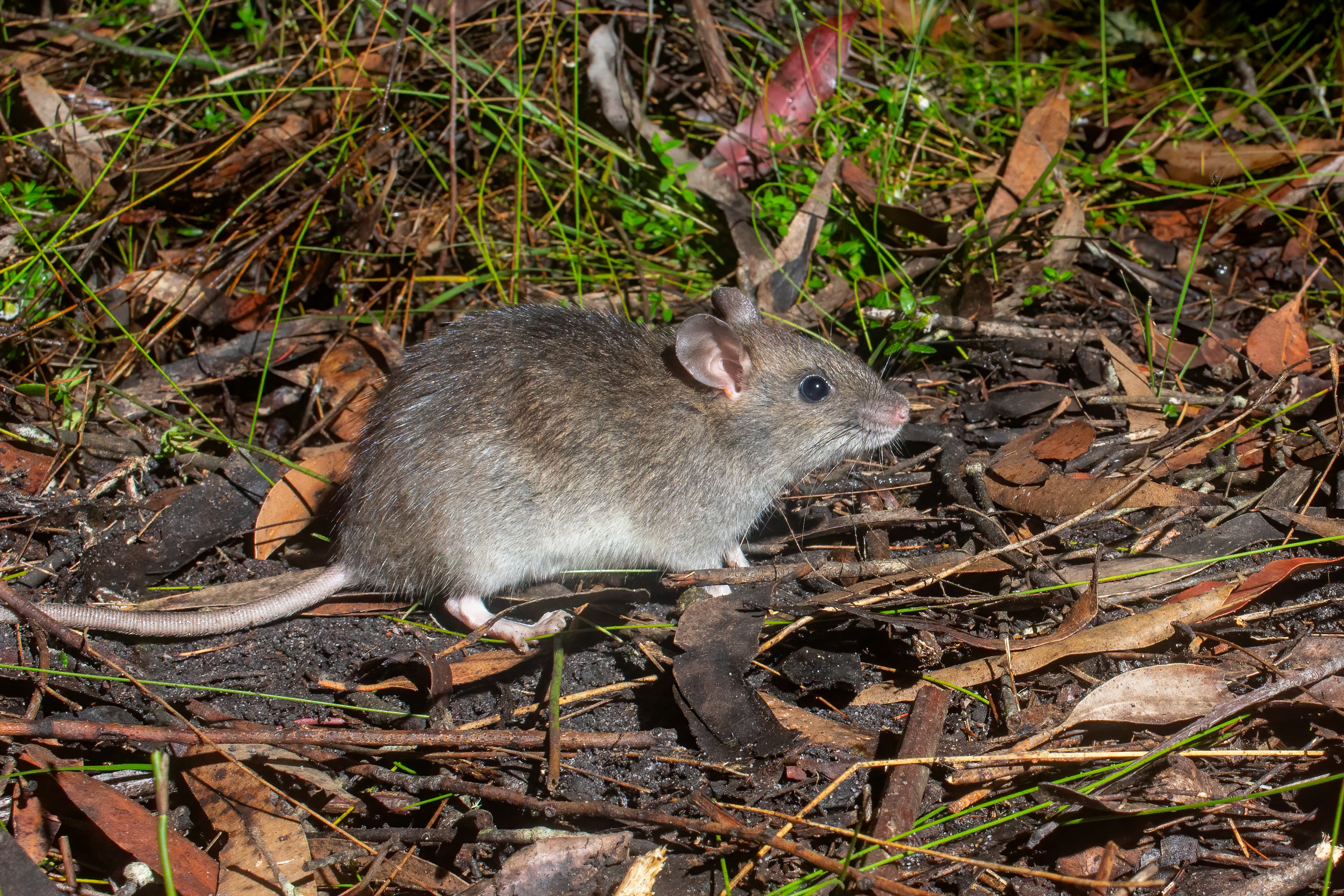

Conservation status
- Least Concern (IUCN 3.1)

Scientific classification
- Kingdom: Animalia
- Phylum: Chordata
- Class: Mammalia
- Order: Rodentia
- Family: Muridae
- Genus: Rattus
- Species: R. fuscipes

Binomial name
- Rattus fuscipes (Waterhouse, 1839)
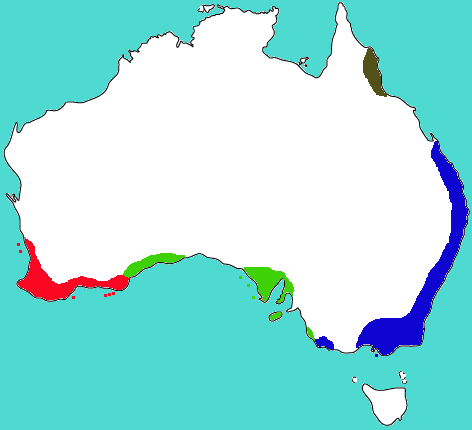
- Distribution on subspecies-level: red=R. f. fuscipes; green=R. f. greyi, blue=R. f. assimilis, brown=R. f. coracius

= Bush rat =

Bush rat Temporal range: Holocene

Species of rodent

The bush rat or Australian bush rat (Rattus fuscipes) is a small Australian nocturnal animal. It is an omnivore and one of the most common indigenous species of rat on the continent, found in many heathland areas of Victoria and New South Wales.

== Taxonomy ==
The description of the species by G. R. Waterhouse was published in the second part of the series Zoology of the Voyage of H.M.S. Beagle, edited by Charles Darwin. The species was assigned to the genus Mus, a once broader classification, and later placed with the genus Rattus. The collection of the type specimen was made when HMS Beagle was anchored at King George Sound, a port at the southwest of the continent. The capture was noted by Darwin as "caught in a trap baited with cheese, amongst the bushes ...". The type locality has been determined as Little Grove, Western Australia, six kilometres (3.7 mi) south of Mount Melville in the city of Albany. The population is regarded as the fuscipes species group, as the species has received various treatments of subspecies.

Four subspecies are recognised, each occurring in different regions or habitat, these are

- R. f. assimilis, common in the coastal region of the south and east of continent, Rockhampton, Queensland to Timboon in Victoria
- R. f. coracius, north-east Queensland, Cooktown and Townsville, in rainforest at low or high altitudes
- R. f. fuscipes, the nominate found in south-west Australia extends from Jurien Bay to Israelite Bay
- R. f. greyii, southern subspecies found from Eyre Peninsula to west of Portland in Victoria

The subspecies R. f. coracius was once supposed to share a closer ancestry with the Cape York species R. leucopus, which share a distribution range, although later evidence has not supported this morphological similarity.

== Description ==
While there are not many characteristics that readily distinguish the bush rat from other Rattus species, it is characterised by having small tympanic bullae and a straight incisive foramen. Adult bush rats are smaller than the Australian swamp rat (R. lutreolus) and in addition, the bush rat's foot pads are a pink colour, whereas the swamp rat's foot pads are dark brown. The hair at the foot is short and pale in colour, subspecies R. f. coracius is notably darker. The feet are pentadactyl and all digits are clawed. The tail is a pink shade of brown, almost free of hair, with scales that overlap and give an obvious ringed appearance. The bush rat exhibits sexual dimorphism: the males are larger than the females in the species. Their prominent eyes are large, and this distinguishes them from the narrower snouted Cape York species Rattus leucopus where their range overlaps.

The species varies greatly in coloration and size. The length of the head and body combined is from 100 to 205 millimetres (3.9 to 8.1 in), the tail is 100 to 195 mm (3.9 to 7.7 in); these measurements are approximately the same in the individuals. The ventral side of the pelage is a light grey or cream colour, which grades with the rufous flank and darker brown of the upper-side; the overall colour is a greyish or reddish brown. The length of the hind foot is 30 to 40 mm (1.2 to 1.6 in) and the ear 18 to 25 mm (0.71 to 0.98 in). The average weight, for a range of 50 to 225 grams (1.8 to 7.9 oz), is 125 g (4.4 oz). The number of teats is variable in the regional populations, the females bears one pair of pectoral teats and four at the inguinal region, except in the north of Queensland where the pectoral teats are absent.

== Distribution and habitat ==
The bush rat is found primarily in the coastal regions of south and eastern Australia. While it is mainly found in the lowlands, the species is also found at higher altitudes in the Australian Alps. The coastal distribution extends to some offshore islands, including Kangaroo Island. The range of the southwestern subspecies R. f. fuscipes is through sclerophyll forest of a high rainfall region. Along the southern coast the subspecies R. f. greyii inhabits arid habitat, while subspecies assimilis is found from Victoria to Queensland.

The habitat of R. fuscipes is terrestrial and favour wetter areas with dense undergrowth. The species constructs a shallow burrow that leads down into a nest chamber lined with grass and other vegetation.

== Threats ==
Some of the biggest threats to the bush rat include red foxes and feral cats, both introduced species. Evidence suggests that the incidence of fire can increase predation of bush rats due to the removal of undergrowth in which they are usually able to hide.

== Diet ==
The bush rat does not show much overlap in diet with other local rodent species. In the summer it consumes primarily fruit, arthropods, and seeds, but in the winter its main source of food is from a particular cyperaceous species. When found in the forest it consumes primarily fungi and various fibrous plant material. Bush rats have been observed feeding on nectar without damaging the blossoms, thus likely aiding in pollination.

== Behaviour ==
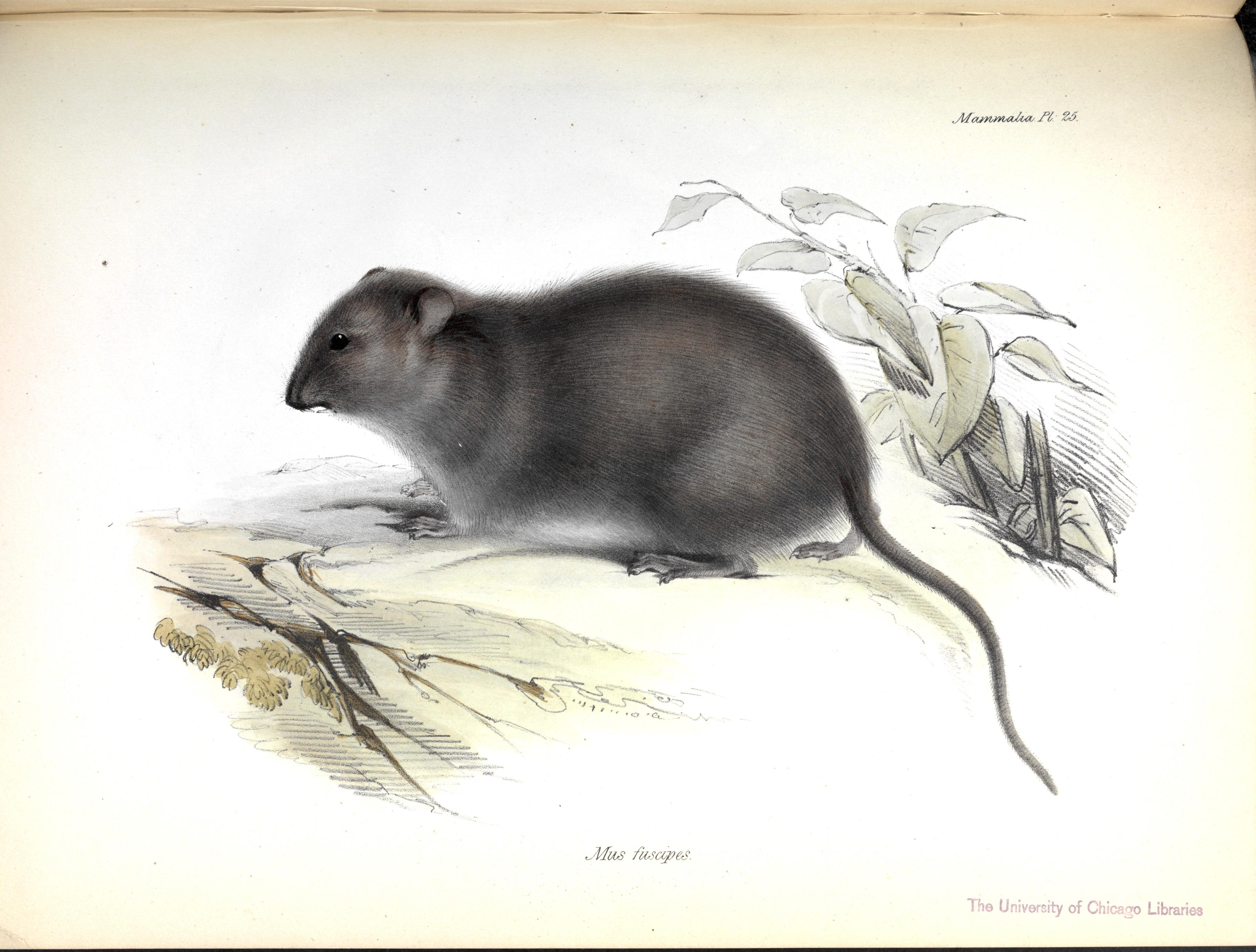
Illustration accompanying the first description

The bush rat is strictly nocturnal and is active year-round. Adults seem to be nomadic, but will rarely leave the forest floor. The species is primarily herbivorous, consuming fungi and plant tissue, but includes arthropods in their diet. It is also the host to more parasites than any other Australian rodent. They exhibit stereotypically normal behaviour when approaching an intruder; boxing, threat-posture, clash, approach. The bush rat is prey to some local predators, including dingos, foxes, birds of prey and reptiles.

Bush rats tend to avoid areas impacted by humans, and populations tend to decline when anthropogenic influences in a region increase.

=== Breeding behaviour ===
The bush rat begins breeding around November and has litter sizes ranging usually between 4–5. The majority of individuals do not live to a second breeding cycle due to their short life span. The gestation period of the bush rat varies between 22 and 24 days. The "nursery" of the bush rat is its burrow. The nursing period lasts for about the first 20–25 days of life.
