= Indian Ocean Drive =

Coastal highway in Western Australia

Indian Ocean Drive Western Australia
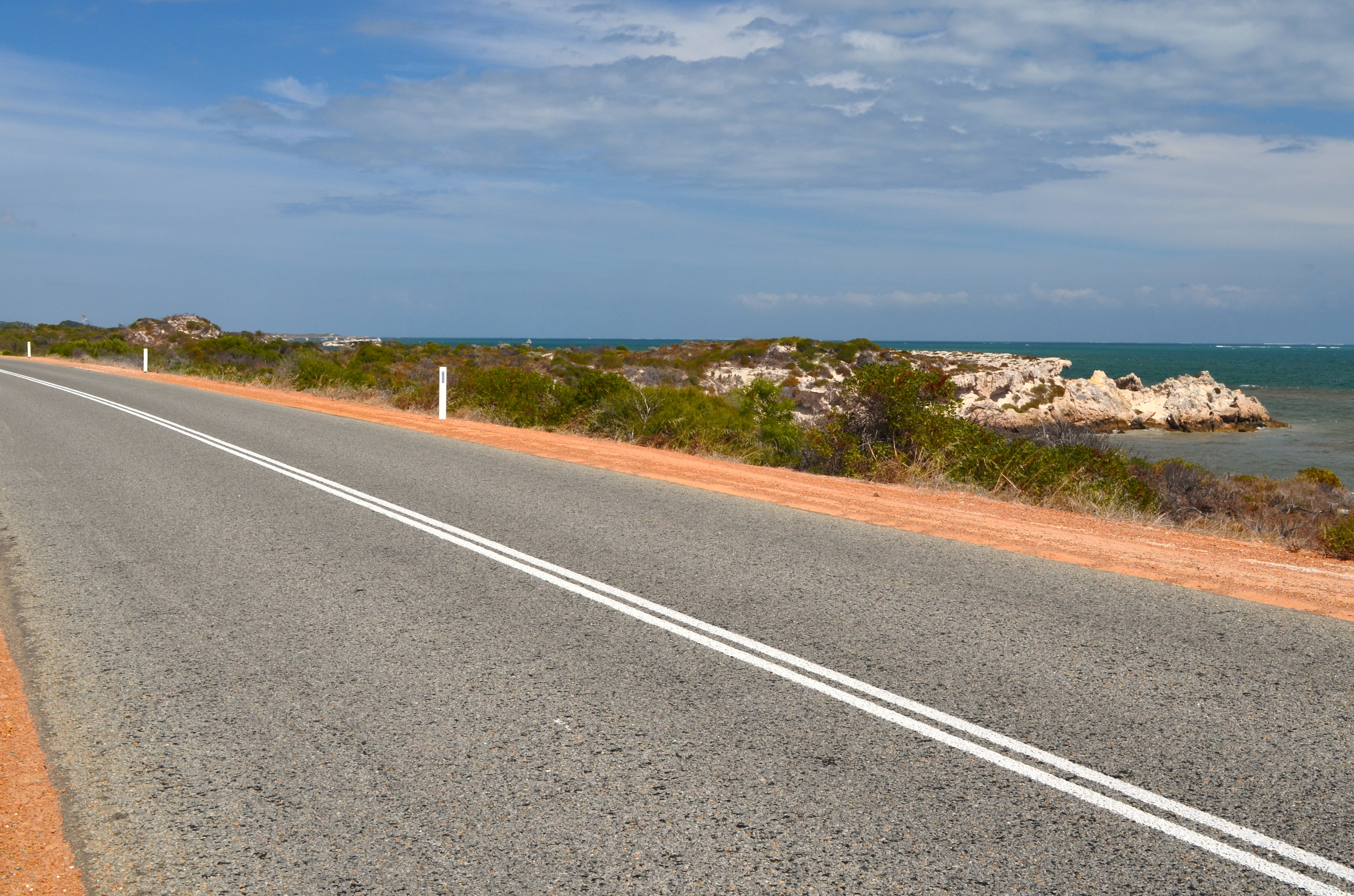
- View south towards Leeman, 2014

General information
- Type: Highway
- Length: 269 km (167 mi)
- Opened: 2010
- Route number(s): State Route 60

Major junctions
- South end: Wanneroo Road, (State Route 60), Yanchep
- North end: Brand Highway, (National Route 1), Arrowsmith

Location(s)
- Major settlements: Woodridge, Gabbadah, Lancelin, Cervantes, Jurien Bay, Green Head, Leeman

Highway system
- Highways in Australia; National Highway • Freeways in Australia; Highways in Western Australia

Indian Ocean Drive is a coastal highway in the Australian state of Western Australia which services the coastal communities along the Indian Ocean immediately north of the state capital Perth, linking the northern suburb of Yanchep with the Brand Highway, just south of Dongara. In terms of regions, most of it exists in the Wheatbelt coastal region. The road provides travellers between Perth and Geraldton a 30-minute shorter and more scenic route than the inland Brand Highway which mainly services heavy traffic. The road also improved access to Wedge Island.

== History ==
On 26 September 2010, the final section of 65 kilometres (40 mi) of sealed road from north of Lancelin to the old Pinnacles Desert Drive, approximately 10 km south of Cervantes, was opened. The section was completed at a cost of $95 million. On completion of the extension, State Route 60 was extended along the length of the road.

In December 2010, the state's Geographic Names Committee, on behalf of the Shire of Gingin, requested that the City of Wanneroo rename the northern section of Wanneroo Road to Indian Ocean Drive. A motion was put forward at the 14 December 2010 council meeting to rename the section from Yanchep Beach Road north to the intersection of Gingin Brook Road, reasoning that terminating Wanneroo Road at Yanchep National Park would "be good for tourism". However, Mayor Jon Kelly considered the proposal a "futile and worthless exercise that was tantamount to heresy". Other councillors called it "offensive to the pioneers" of Wanneroo and wished to retain the name Wanneroo in the area's only main road. An alternative motion stating that the council "does not agree" to renaming the road was passed instead. However, a subsequent renaming request was passed, and the name Indian Ocean Drive was extended down to Yanchep Beach Road in 2011.

=== Safety ===
The road, mainly the section between Yanchep and Lancelin, has been the scene of many car accidents. An 18-month period to June 2017 saw more than 50 serious crashes occurring on the road, while at least nine fatalities and 41 people have been taken to hospital as a result of crashes along Indian Ocean Drive between 2014 and 2019.

Since 2020, Indian Ocean Drive has received over $85 million in upgrades to improve the safety of the route, including widening and realignment works and the addition of overtaking lanes, audible lines and advisory signage in multiple languages. However as of October 2025, the road remains notorious for its rate of accidents and serious crashes.

== Localities on coast ==
From the Perth metropolitan region that ceases before Yanchep:

- Two Rocks
- Guilderton
- Seabird
- Ledge Point
- Lancelin
- Wedge Island
- Grey
- Cervantes
- Jurien Bay
- Green Head
- Leeman
- Coolimba
- Illawong
- Port Denison
- Dongara

== Major intersections ==
LGA	Location	km	mi	Destinations	Notes
Wanneroo	Yanchep	0.00	0.00	Yanchep Beach Road – Yanchep, Two Rocks west / Wanneroo Road (State Route 60) – Neerabup, Wanneroo, Perth south	Southern terminus of Indian Ocean Drive; Road continues south as Wanneroo Road (State Route 60)
Wanneroo	Yanchep	0.2	0.12	Old Yanchep Road – Pinjar, Banksia Grove, Mariginiup	
Wanneroo–Gingin boundary	Two Rocks–Yeal boundary	10	6.2	Breakwater Drive – Two Rocks, Yanchep	
Gingin	Neergabby–Woodridge boundary	30	19	Gingin Brook Road – Gingin	
Gingin	Gabbadah	36	22	Guilderton Road – Guilderton	
Gingin	Breton Bay–Gabbadah boundary	43	27	Seabird Road – Seabird	
Gingin	Karakin–Ledge Point boundary	63	39	Ledge Point Road – Ledge Point	
Gingin	Karakin–Lancelin–Ledge Point tripoint	66	41	KW Road – Ledge Point	Connects to Brand Highway and Gingin Brook Road via Sappers Road and Cowalla Road
Gingin	Karakin–Lancelin boundary	68	42	Lancelin Road – Lancelin	
Gingin–Dandaragan boundary	Cooljarloo–Mimegarra–Wedge Island tripoint	90	56	Meadows Road – Cataby	Connects to Brand Highway via Mimegarra Road
Dandaragan	Nambung	133	83	Pinnacles Drive – The Pinnacles	
Dandaragan	Cervantes–Nambung boundary	145	90	Cervantes Road – Cervantes, Badgingarra	Staggered T junctions. Connects to Brand Highway via Munbinea Road and Bibby Road
Dandaragan	Jurien Bay	171	106	Jurien Road – Hill River	Note Indian Ocean Drive is known as Bashford Street inside the Jurien Bay townsite
Coorow	Green Head	198	123	The Lakes Road – Green Head	
Coorow	Green Head–Leeman boundary	201	125	Coorow–Green Head Road – Warradarge, Coorow northeast / Green Head Road – Green Head southwest	Staggered T junctions
Carnamah	Eneabba	221	137	Eneabba–Coolimba Road – Eneabba	
Irwin	Arrowsmith	269	167	Brand Highway (National Route 1) – Dongara, Geraldton, Eneabba, Perth	Northern terminus of Indian Ocean Drive and State Route 60
1.000 mi = 1.609 km; 1.000 km = 0.621 mi

== See also ==
- The Pinnacles
