= Gabbadah, Western Australia =

Gabbadah
- Town
- Coordinates: 31.29°S 115.52°E
- Country: Australia
- State: Western Australia
- LGA(s): Shire of Gingin
- Location: 90 km (56 mi) NNW of Perth; 44 km (27 mi) WNW of Gingin; 36 km (22 mi) SE of Lancelin

Government
  - State electorate(s): Moore
  - Federal division(s): Durack

Area
  - Total: 65.3 km^{2} (25.2 sq mi)
- Elevation: 38 m (125 ft)

Population
  - Total(s): 764 (SAL 2021)
- Postcode: 6041
Localities around Gabbadah
Seabird	Breton Bay
Indian Ocean	Gabbadah	Neergabby
Guilderton	Caraban	Woodridge

Gabbadah is a locality within the Shire of Gingin, located around 30 km north of Perth metropolitan area's northern limit.

Gabbadah, an Aboriginal term meaning "mouthful of water", was the original name of the location where the Moore River meets the Indian Ocean. The area marks the southern extent of the Yued Noongar country, with white settlement not occurring until 1905 where a 100-acre block owned by Henry Brockman, was made a reserve for picnicking and camping. A well and 3 cottages were built in 1907 and people were charged one shilling per week for the use of these cottages. The settlement continued to develop until it was regazetted as the town of Guilderton in 1951.

Modern day Gabbadah is used to define the postcode boundary for the coastal region separating the towns of Guilderton and Seabird with the eastern limit marking the Moore River State Forest. Indian Ocean Drive bisects the area in two, with the vast majority of the residential development occurring to the east in the form of two semi-rural residential estates. Redfield Park Estate, the more northerly of the two, lies halfway between Indian Ocean Drive's turnoffs to Seabird and Guilderton while Sovereign Hill Estate is situated just east after the latter turnoff (towards Perth). Two sand and limestone quarries are located near the boundary with Guilderton.

The two estates have a combined permanent population of 764 as of the 2021 census. This technically makes Gabbadah the third most populated locality in the Shire of Gingin (after Gingin itself and Lancelin) and is in fact more than twice the combined population of the two gazetted towns the locality separates.
