= Yanchep Beach Road =

Road in Western Australia

Yanchep Beach Road Western Australia

General information
- Type: Road
- Length: 6 km (3.7 mi)
- Opened: 1970s

Major junctions
- East end: Wanneroo Road, Indian Ocean Drive (State Route 60)
- Marmion Avenue
- West end: Two Rocks Road, Brazier Road

Location(s)
- Major suburbs: Yanchep

Yanchep Beach Road is an east-west road in outer northern Perth; it provides access to the outermost northern coastal suburbs of Yanchep and Two Rocks from Wanneroo Road as it leaves the Perth metropolitan area. The road is mostly a single carriageway with one lane in each direction, and commences in the Yanchep National Park near Lake Yonderup. It was built in the early 1970s to service land owned by the Bond Corporation and became a vital route during the operation of Atlantis Marine Park between 1981 and 1990. It has decreased in importance following the opening of the Marmion Avenue extension to Yanchep in 2008.

== History ==
People have travelled to the coast along the route since at least the 1920s. The Wanneroo Road Board in the 1930s endeavoured to improve what was basically a sand track.

The historic Vaz's Store, located midway along Yanchep Beach Road, had serviced the needs of travellers until it was destroyed by a bushfire in December 2019. It had been in continual use since the 1920s, and last had a petrol station in front of the heritage listed shop building.

== Intersections ==
The first 2 km are located within the Yanchep National Park, which contains sites of Aboriginal significance, caves, picnic facilities and a small museum, and the first turnoff provides access to Loch McNess in the park. After crossing the proposed alignment of Mitchell Freeway and passing an old general store, it skirts an 18-hole golf course, Sun City Country Club, before intersecting with St Andrews Drive, which provides access to the residential area adjoining the golf course. A small industrial estate is located just outside Yanchep.

Yanchep Beach Road enters Yanchep at a large roundabout with Marmion Avenue, which until 2008 was simply a 300-metre-long suburban road. The road then forms the northern boundary of the settlement for 1 km, terminating at Two Rocks Road, which continues on to Club Capricorn and Two Rocks.

The eastern end of the road does not quite join with the Old Yanchep Road which is aligned with the original entrance to the park slightly further north.

Location	km	mi	Destinations	Notes
Yanchep	0.0	0.0	Indian Ocean Drive northbound/ Wanneroo Road southbound (State Route 60) – Lancelin, Jurien Bay, Wanneroo, Perth	Eastern terminus of Yanchep Beach Road at t-junction
Yanchep	3.2	2.0	Parkland Drive	Roundabout
Yanchep	3.7	2.3	Saint Andrews Drive northbound / Mapleton Drive southbound	Roundabout. Access to Yanchep railway station
Yanchep	4.1	2.5	Spinnaker Boulevard northbound / Barakee Entrance southbound	Roundabout
Yanchep	5.1– 5.4	3.2– 3.4	Marmion Avenue (State Route 71) – Eglinton, Alkimos, Hillarys, Scarborough	Roundabout. Access to Yanchep railway station
Yanchep	5.7	3.5	Beachside Parade northbound / Wilkie Avenue southbound	Roundabout
Yanchep	6.2	3.9	Two Rocks Road northbound / Brazier Road southbound – Two Rocks, Wilbinga	Western terminus of Yanchep Beach Road at t-junction
1.000 mi = 1.609 km; 1.000 km = 0.621 mi
