= Moore River (disambiguation) =

Moore River in Western Australia can refer to a number of places:

- Moore River, the river itself
- Moore River National Park, national park that the river runs through
- Guilderton, Western Australia, the township at the river mouth, often referred to by locals as Moore River
- Moore River Native Settlement, a disbanded aboriginal settlement 10 km west of Mogumber
