= List of State Register of Heritage Places in the Shire of Gingin =

List of heritage sites in Western Australia

The State Register of Heritage Places is maintained by the Heritage Council of Western Australia. As of 2026, 132 places are heritage-listed in the Shire of Gingin, of which 13 are on the State Register of Heritage Places.

== List ==
The Western Australian State Register of Heritage Places, as of 2026, lists the following 13 state registered places within the Shire of Gingin:

Place name	Place #	Street number	Street name	Suburb or town	Co-ordinates	Notes & former names	Photo
Gingin Post Office	1076	16	Brockman Street	Gingin	31.345688°S 115.904935°E		
Old Junction Hotel	1080	Lot 10	Gingin Brook Road	Neergabby	31.301407°S 115.608287°E	Junction Hotel (former)	
Gingin Railway Station and Quarters	1082	Lot 500	Jones Street	Gingin	31.350884°S 115.904845°E		
Dewar's House	1083	15	Weld Street	Gingin	31.350158°S 115.907793°E	Railway Hotel (former)	
St Luke's Anglican Church, Cemetery and Belfry	1085	Lot 1	Weld Street	Gingin	31.347811°S 115.904197°E		
Cowalla Homestead Group	1088		Cowalla Road	Cowalla	31.056321°S 115.56466°E	Whitfields	
Mogumber Mission (former) & Cemetery	3618	2465	Mogumber Road	Mindarra	31.010158°S 115.928981°E	Mogumber Farm, Mogumber Mission Settlement, Moore River Native Settlement	
Moondah Homestead	3721		Mooliabeenee Road	Mooliabeenee	31.341716°S 115.940686°E	Moondap	
St Luke's (Anglican) Church Rectory	3722	Lot 2	Weld Street	Gingin	31.348392°S 115.903206°E	St Lukes Rectory	
Old Junction Bridge	13064	Lot 10 SL 526		Neergabby	31.302736°S 115.607518°E	Junction Bridge, MRWA 4036 old	
North West Stock Route (former) Stage 1	15873			Yanchep and Gingin		Old North Rd, Coastal Stock Route, Old North, Stock Route, Champion Bay Stock Route This is the 28 km section of the route from Yanchep to Neergabby, through the City of Wanneroo and the Shire of Gingin	
Mogumber Cemetery	17815	2465	Mogumber Road	Mogumber	31.015463°S 115.92624°E	Mogumber Burial Site	
Neergabby	18096			Neergabby	^{[?]}	The Junction Part of the North West Stock Route (former) Stage 1 precinct (15873)	

== Notes ==
- ^[?]No coordinates specified by Inherit database
