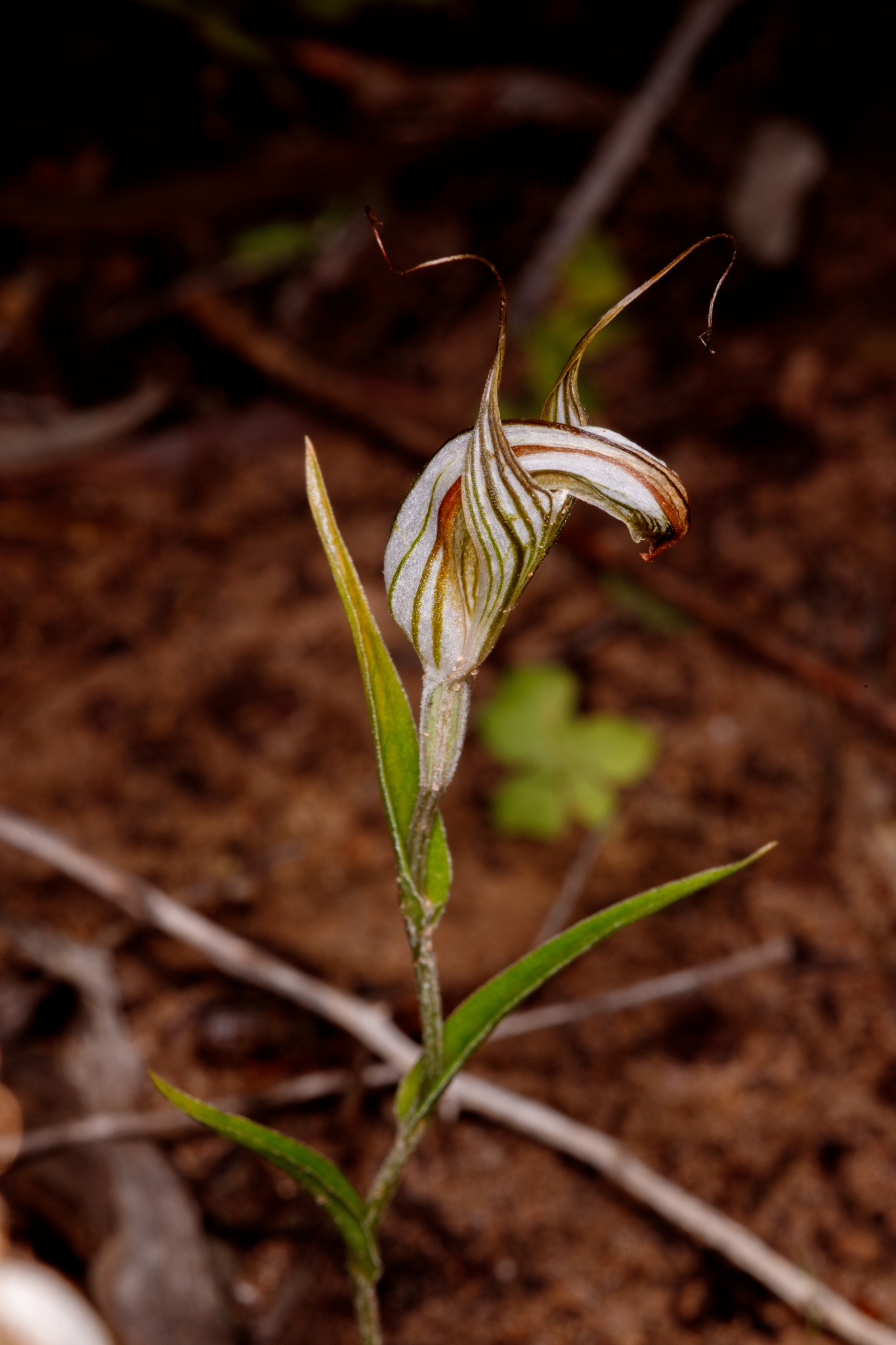

Scientific classification
- Kingdom: Plantae
- Clade: Tracheophytes
- Clade: Angiosperms
- Clade: Monocots
- Order: Asparagales
- Family: Orchidaceae
- Subfamily: Orchidoideae
- Tribe: Cranichideae
- Genus: Pterostylis
- Species: P. microglossa

Binomial name
- Pterostylis microglossa D.L.Jones & C.J.French

Synonyms
- Diplodium microglossum (D.L.Jones & C.J.French) D.L.Jones

= Pterostylis microglossa =

Kalbarri shell orchid

Species of orchid

Pterostylis microglossa, commonly known as Kalbarri shell orchid, is a species of orchid endemic to the south-west of Western Australia. Non-flowering plants have a rosette of leaves flat on the ground but flowering plants lack a rosette and have a flowering stem with leaves and a single green, white and brownish-red flower.

== Description ==
Pterostylis microglossa is a terrestrial, perennial, deciduous, herb with an underground tuber. Non-flowering plants have a rosette of more or less round leaves and sometimes the plants form colonies so that the rosette leaves cover an area of several square metres. Flowering plants lack a rosette but have a single green, white and brownish-red flower 20–25 mm (0.8–1 in) long and 8–10 mm (0.3–0.4 in) wide on a flowering stem 50–120 mm (2–5 in) high. There are between four and six leaves 10–25 mm (0.4–1 in) long and 3–6 mm (0.1–0.2 in) wide on the flowering stem. The dorsal sepal and petals are fused, forming a hood or "galea" over the column, the dorsal sepal with a short point. The lateral sepals are held close to the galea and have erect, tips 12–15 mm (0.5–0.6 in) long. The labellum is short but just visible above the sinus between the lateral sepals. Flowering occurs in June and July.

== Taxonomy and naming ==
Pterostylis microglossa was first formally described in 2012 by David Jones and Christopher French from a specimen collected near Kalbarri National Park and the description was published in Australian Orchid Review. The species had previously been known as Pterostylis sp. 'Kalbarri'. The specific epithet (microglossa) is derived from the Ancient Greek words mikros meaning "small" or "little" and glossa meaning "tongue" referring to the relatively short labellum.

== Distribution and habitat ==
Kalbarri shell orchid grows in shallow soil on granite outcrops and on consolidated sand dunes between Shark Bay and the Moore River in the Geraldton Sandplains and Swan Coastal Plain biogeographic regions.

== Conservation ==
Pterostylis microglossa is listed as "not threatened" by the Government of Western Australia Department of Parks and Wildlife.
