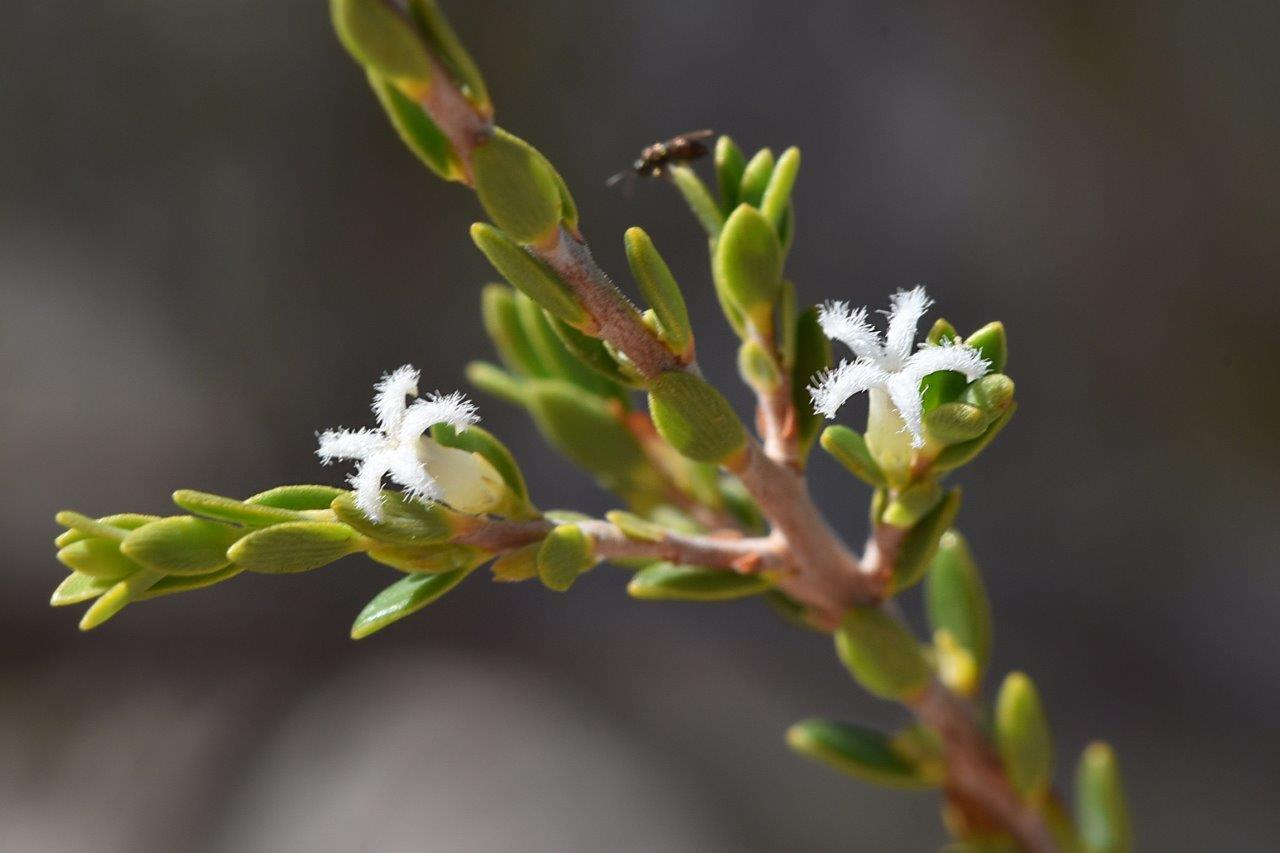

Scientific classification
- Kingdom: Plantae
- Clade: Tracheophytes
- Clade: Angiosperms
- Clade: Eudicots
- Clade: Asterids
- Order: Ericales
- Family: Ericaceae
- Genus: Styphelia
- Species: S. ciliosa

Binomial name
- Styphelia ciliosa Hislop & Puente-Lel.

= Styphelia ciliosa =

Species of plant

Styphelia ciliosa is a species of flowering plant in the heath family Ericaceae and is endemic to a small area of Western Australia. It is usually an erect shrub with narrowly elliptic to narrowly egg-shaped leaves with the narrower end towards the base, and white flowers usually arranged in pairs in leaf axils.

== Description ==
Styphelia ciliosa is usually an erect shrub that typically grows up to 1.5 m (4 ft 11 in) high and wide, its young branchlets hairy. The leaves are directed upwards and are narrowly elliptic to narrowly egg-shaped with the narrower end towards the base, 3.5–9.0 mm (0.14–0.35 in) long and 1.0–2.2 mm (0.039–0.087 in) wide on a petiole 10.3–0.8 mm (0.406–0.031 in) long. Both sides of the leaves are more or less glabrous, but the lower surface is a lighter shade of green. The flowers are usually arranged in pairs in leaf axils with egg-shaped bracts 0.7–1.0 mm (0.028–0.039 in) long and bracteoles 0.5–1.1 mm (0.020–0.043 in) long and 0.4–0.5 mm (0.016–0.020 in) long at the base. The sepals are narrowly egg-shaped, 1.4–1.8 mm (0.055–0.071 in) long and 0.4–0.6 mm (0.016–0.024 in) wide, the petals white, forming a tube 2.0–2.7 mm (0.079–0.106 in) long with lobes 1.8–2.7 mm (0.071–0.106 in) long and bearded on the inside. Flowering mainly occurs from September to November and the fruit is narrowly elliptic, 3.5–5.0 mm (0.14–0.20 in) long and 1.2–1.5 mm (0.047–0.059 in) wide.

== Taxonomy ==
Styphelia ciliosa was first formally described in 2019 by Michael Clyde Hislop and Caroline Puente-Lelievre in the journal Nuytsia from specimens collected by Hislop in the Moore River National Park in 1999. The specific epithet (ciliosa) means "full of fine hairs", referring to the scales on the nectary of this species.

== Distribution and habitat ==
This styphelia grows in Banksia woodland between the Warradarge area and Badgingarra, and around Keysbrook, in the Geraldton Sandplains and Swan Coastal Plain bioregions of south-western Western Australia.

== Conservation status ==
Styphelia ciliosa is listed as "not threatened" by the Western Australian Government Department of Biodiversity, Conservation and Attractions.
