= Woodridge, Western Australia =

Woodridge
- Town
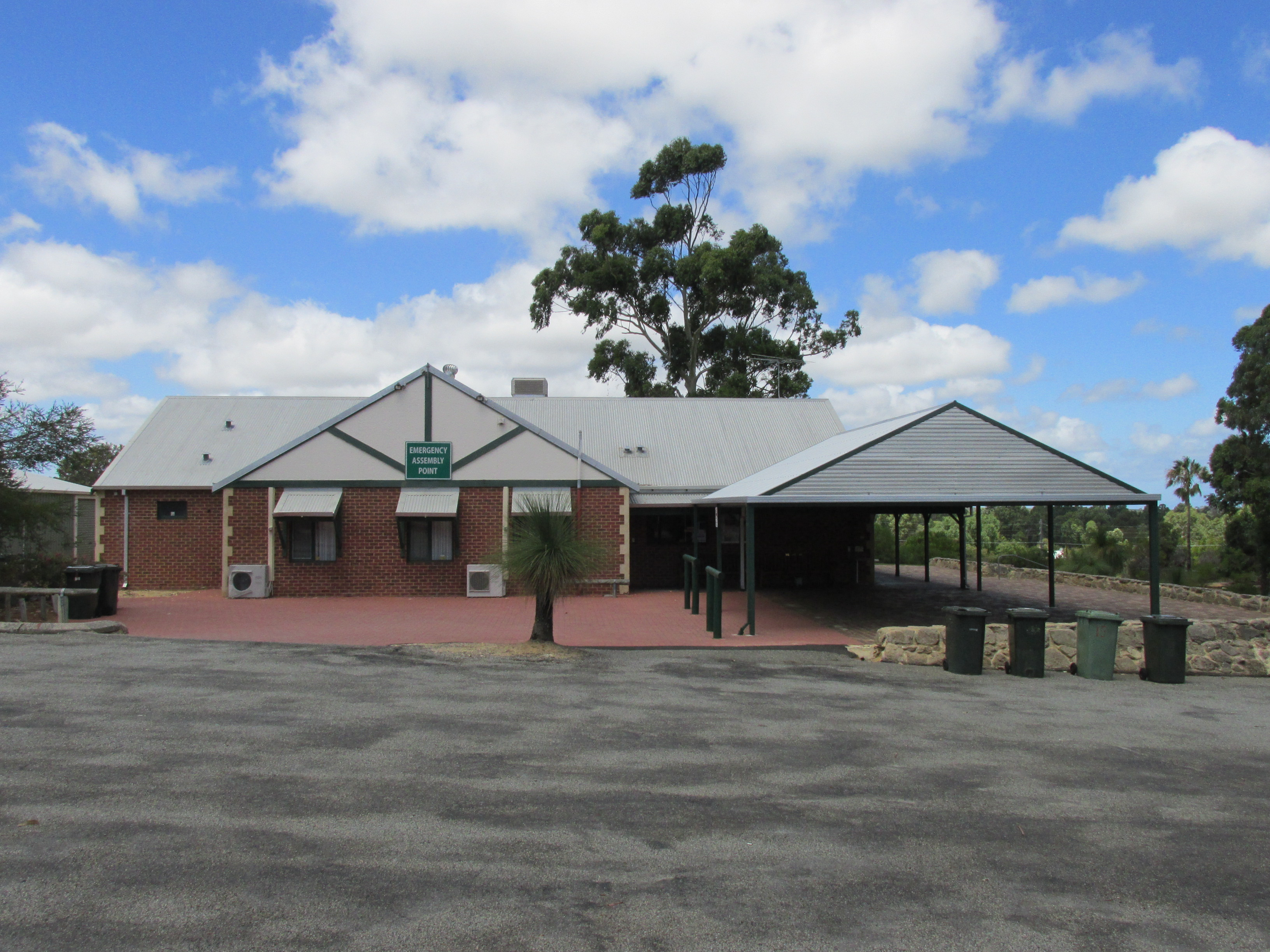
- Woodridge Community Centre

- Coordinates: 31°20′00″S 115°36′00″E
- Country: Australia
- State: Western Australia
- LGA(s): Shire of Gingin
- Location: 75 km (47 mi) NNW of Perth; 28 km (17 mi) W of Gingin

Government
  - State electorate(s): Moore
  - Federal division(s): Pearce

Area
  - Total: 17.3 km^{2} (6.7 sq mi)
- Elevation: 45 m (148 ft)

Population
  - Total(s): 639 (SAL 2021)
- Postcode: 6041
Localities around Woodridge
Gabbadah		Neergabby
Guilderton	Woodridge
Caraban		Wilbinga

Woodridge is a town and rural residential estate located 75 kilometres (47 mi) north of the Perth central business district, the capital city of Western Australia, on the western side of Indian Ocean Drive near the Moore River. It is separated from Perth's residential area by a 13-kilometre (8 mi) wide area of State Forest at Wilbinga. In the 2016 census, it had a population of 645, up from the population of 584 at the 2011 Census, up from 565 at the 2006 Census, and 541 and 485 at the 2001 and 1996 censuses respectively.

There is a community hall and a small art and craft shop with crafts handmade by locals. Each year there are a few community Fairs in the warmer months. There is a well tended local park with old large trees and a pond inhabited by ducks and geese, along with large tennis courts. Woodridge also has a local fire station and an area to lower boats into the Moore river for good fishing. Being close to the Moore River tourist area, it is a relatively hidden gem worth a visit for its sense of country charm. In 2011 the proposed skate park and bmx trail was approved to be started that year. Properties are all acreages the smallest being about one and a half acres and the largest unknown but an estimate would be 20 acres as there are working farms within the community.

According to some long-time locals, Woodridge was established by Mormons in approximately the early 1980s and was a Mormon dominant community, though it is no longer considered to be so with families of various faiths. According to other long-time locals who bought in 1981 (after the original estate developers went bust), Woodridge was never a Mormon community at all, and originally was marketed as semi-rural acreages with the area near the community hall (currently Wooly Bush Loop) originally being a golf course.
