= Leucopogon maritimus =

Conservation status
- Priority One — Poorly Known Taxa (DEC)

Scientific classification
- Kingdom: Plantae
- Clade: Tracheophytes
- Clade: Angiosperms
- Clade: Eudicots
- Clade: Asterids
- Order: Ericales
- Family: Ericaceae
- Genus: Leucopogon
- Species: L. maritimus

Binomial name
- Leucopogon maritimus Hislop
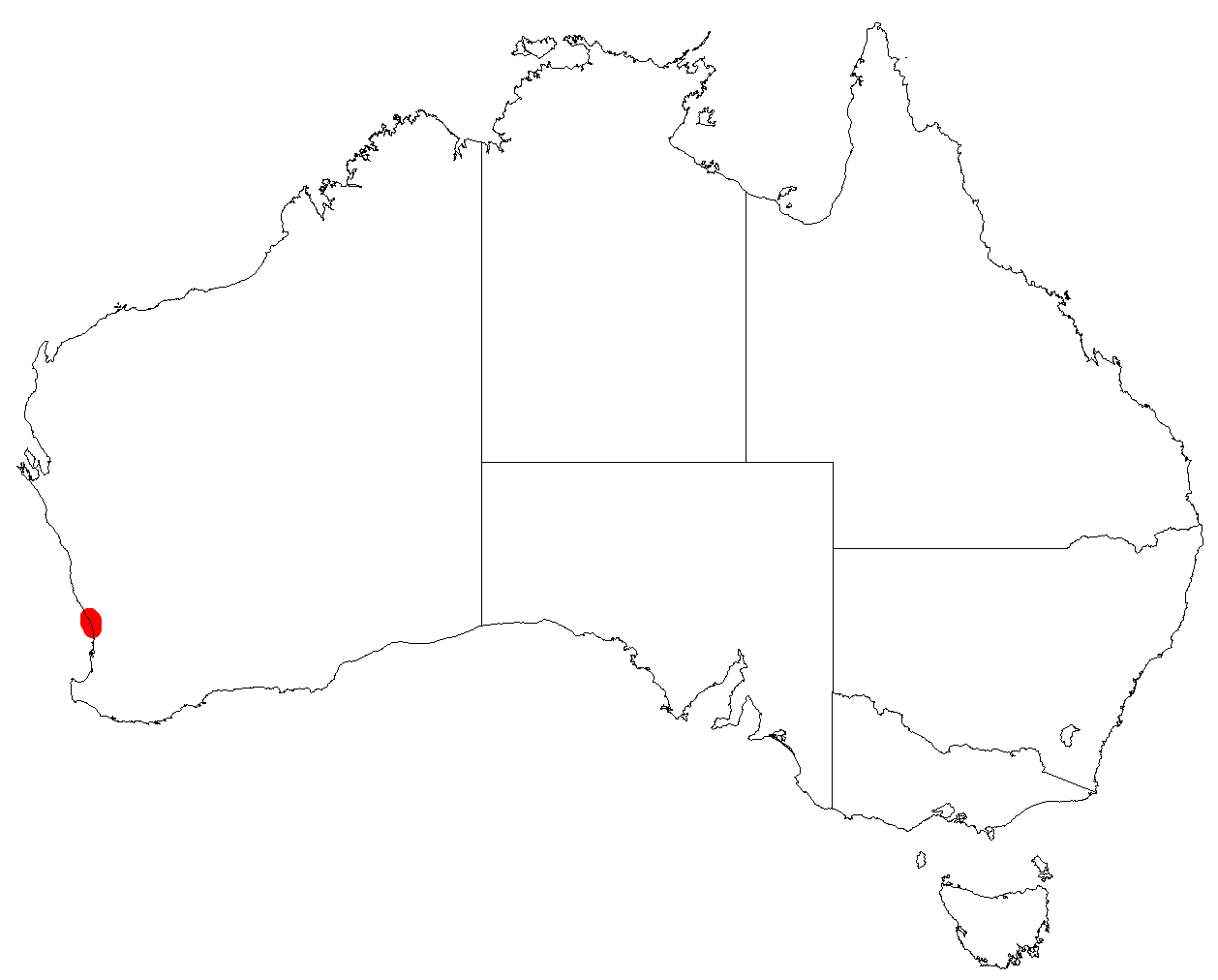
- Occurrence data from AVH

Species of plant

Leucopogon maritimus is a species of flowering plant in the heath family Ericaceae and is endemic to the west coast of Western Australia. It is a low, spreading shrub with hairy young branchlets, erect, narrowly elliptic leaves and erect white, tube-shaped flowers in upper leaf axils or on the ends of branches.

== Description ==
Leucopogon maritimus is a shrub that typically grows up to about 40 cm (16 in) high and 60 cm (24 in) wide, its young branchlets densely covered with hairs up to 0.5 mm (0.020 in) long. The leaves are erect, spirally arranged, narrowly elliptic, 3.9–8.6 mm (0.15–0.34 in) long and 1.2–2.6 mm (0.047–0.102 in) wide on a cream-coloured or yellowish petiole 0.3–0.6 mm (0.012–0.024 in) long. Both surfaces of the leaves are more or less glabrous and shiny. The flowers are arranged in groups of 4 to 12 at the ends of branchlets or in upper leaf axils, with egg-shaped or narrowly egg-shaped bracts 0.9–1.8 mm (0.035–0.071 in) long, and slightly larger bracteoles, the sepals egg-shaped or narrowly egg-shaped and 1.9–3.0 mm (0.075–0.118 in) long. The petals are white, joined at the base to form a broadly bell-shaped tube 0.8–1.2 mm (0.031–0.047 in) long, the lobes widely spreading, curved backwards and 1.9–2.8 mm (0.075–0.110 in) long. Flowering has been observed from November to August and the fruit is an elliptic to oval drupe 1.3–1.8 mm (0.051–0.071 in) long.

== Taxonomy and naming ==
Leucopogon maritimus was first formally described in 2011 by Michael Clyde Hislop in the journal Nuytsia from specimens he collected near Wilbinga in 2008. The specific epithet (maritimus) means "by the sea", referring to this species' distribution.

== Distribution and habitat ==
This leucopogon grows in low, near-coastal heath 40 to 70 km (25 to 43 mi) north of Perth in the Swan Coastal Plain bioregion in the west of Western Australia.

== Conservation status ==
Leucopogon maritimus is listed as "Priority One" by the Government of Western Australia Department of Biodiversity, Conservation and Attractions, meaning that it is known from only one or a few locations that are potentially at risk.
