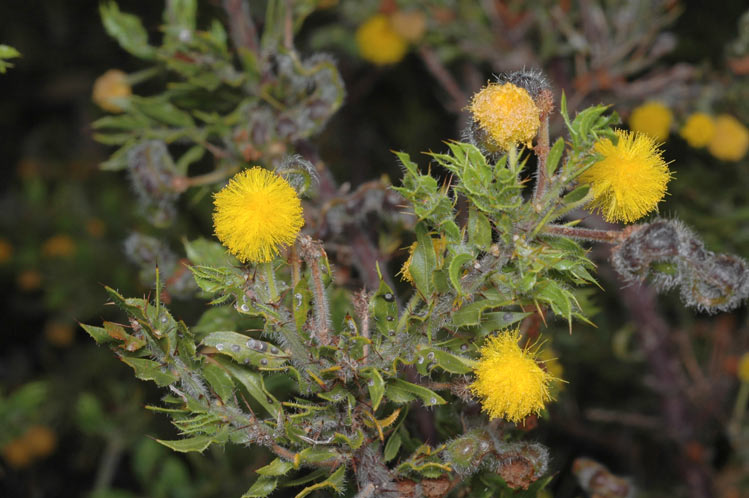

Scientific classification
- Kingdom: Plantae
- Clade: Tracheophytes
- Clade: Angiosperms
- Clade: Eudicots
- Clade: Rosids
- Order: Fabales
- Family: Fabaceae
- Subfamily: Caesalpinioideae
- Clade: Mimosoid clade
- Genus: Acacia
- Species: A. idiomorpha

Binomial name
- Acacia idiomorpha A.Cunn. ex Benth.
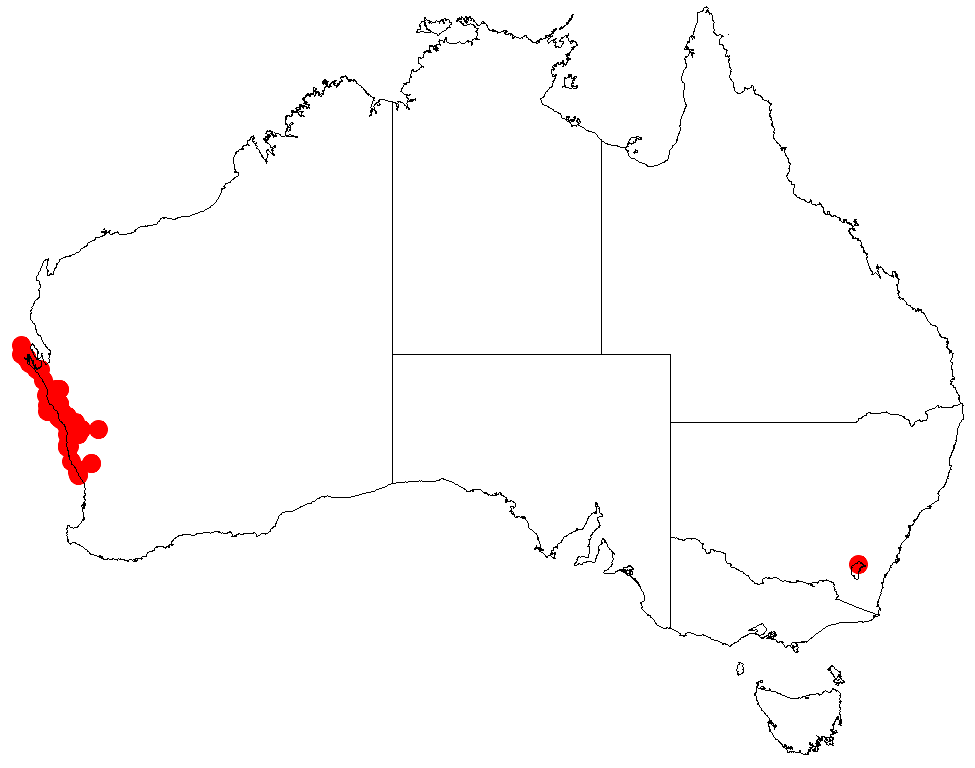
- Occurrence data from AVH

Synonyms
- Racosperma idiomorphum (A.Cunn. ex Benth.) Pedley

= Acacia idiomorpha =

Species of legume

Acacia idiomorpha is a species of flowering plant in the family Fabaceae and is endemic to the south-west of Western Australia. It is a spreading, sprawling, spiny shrub with wavy, asymmetically egg-shaped to narrowly egg-shaped, elliptic to narrowly elliptic or narrowly oblong phyllodes, spherical to slightly oblong heads of golden yellow flowers and wavy, narrowly oblong, often curved pods.

== Description ==
Acacia idiomorpha is a spreading, sprawling, spiny shrub that typically grows to a height of 0.2–1 m (7.9 in – 3 ft 3.4 in) and has branchlets sometimes covered with soft hairs. Its phyllodes are wavy, asymmetically egg-shaped to narrowly egg-shaped, elliptic to narrowly elliptic, or narrowly oblong 5–25 mm (0.20–0.98 in) long and 3–14 mm (0.12–0.55 in) wide and have one prominent vein. There are straight or curved, bristly or spiny stipules at the base of the phyllodes. The flowers are borne in one or two spherical to slightly oblong heads in axils on peduncles 5–25 mm (0.20–0.98 in) long, each head 5–8 mm (0.20–0.31 in) in diameter with 40 to 100 golden yellow flowers. Flowering occurs from June to August, and the pods are wavy, often curved, up to 60 mm (2.4 in) long, 4–5 mm (0.16–0.20 in) wide and densely covers with shaggy hairs. The seeds are oblong to widely egg-shaped or elliptic, 3 mm (0.12 in) long, often mottled, light grey or brown with an aril near the end.

== Taxonomy ==
Acacia idiomorpha was first formally described by George Bentham in Hooker's London Journal of Botany, from an unpublished description by Allan Cunningham of specimens he found on Dirk Hartog Island. The specific epithet (idiomorpha) means 'distinctly shaped', referring to the stipules.

== Distribution and habitat ==
This species of wattle grows in sand or loam, often over sandstone or limestone on coastal cliffs and dunes or along rivers near the coast in coastal and near-coastal areas from Ledge Point to Tamala Station and Dirk Hartog Island in the Avon Wheatbelt, Geraldton Sandplains, Jarrah Forest, Swan Coastal Plain and Yalgoo bioregions of south-western Western Australia.

== Conservation status ==
Acacia idiomorpha is listed as "not threatened" by the Western Australian Government Department of Biodiversity, Conservation and Attractions.

== See also ==
- List of Acacia species
