= Neergabby, Western Australia =

Neergabby
- Town
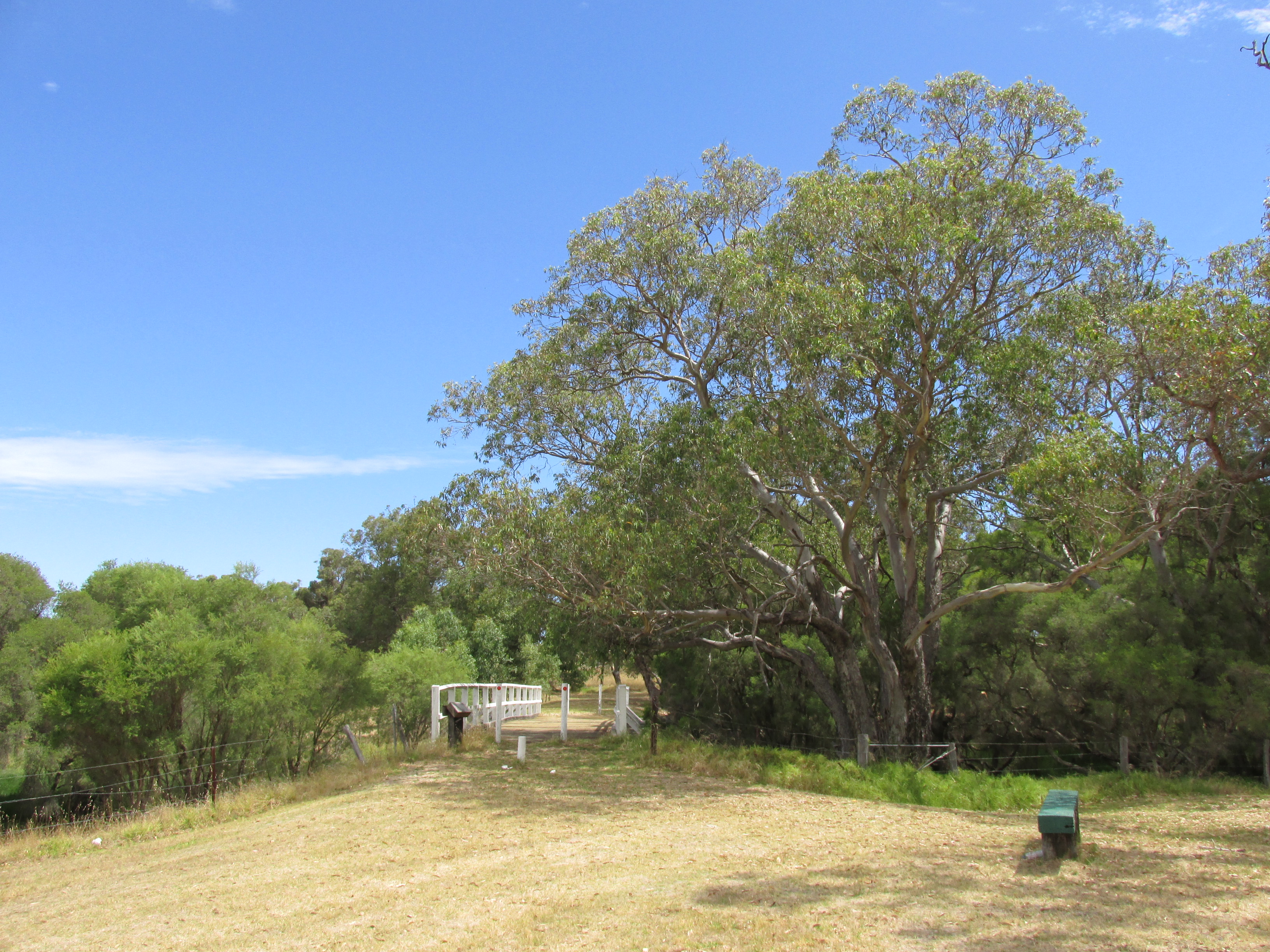
- Old Junction Bridge crossing Gingin Brook in 2015

- Interactive map of Neergabby
- Coordinates: 31.3°S 115.6°E
- Country: Australia
- State: Western Australia
- LGA: Shire of Gingin
- Location: 84 km (52 mi) N of Perth; 26 km (16 mi) WNW of Gingin; 20 km (12 mi) NE of Guilderton

Government
  - State electorate: Mid-West
  - Federal division: Durack

Area
  - Total: 111.9 km^{2} (43.2 sq mi)

Population
  - Total: 268 (SAL 2021)
- Postcode: 6503
Localities around Neergabby
Breton Bay	Wanerie	Beermullah
Gabbadah	Neergabby	Muckenburra
Woodridge	Wilbinga	Yeal

Neergabby is a farming area within the Shire of Gingin in Western Australia, located around 20 km north of the Perth metropolitan area's northern boundary.

Neergabby is situated at the confluence of the Moore River and Gingin Brook, giving it a strategic importance in the development of the North West Stock Route between Perth and Geraldton during the 1850s when it was often known as the Junction. Prior to European settlement, the area was used by women of the Noongar people to gather food and medicinal plants.

A government road connecting Gingin to Neergabby and the Moore River was built in the early 1860s. This included Old Junction Bridge, which dates back to 1863 and was restored by the Neergabby Community Association in 2005 after its western span collapsed three years earlier.

Neergabby and the wider stock route was heavily used until the Midland railway line was constructed in the 1890s several kilometres further east. The line caused the stock route to decline in importance (save for a revival during World War II) until the only people using it were summer holiday makers accessing coastal bays for camping.

Despite its location in the Wheatbelt region, Neergabby's proximity to both the coast and fresh water allows for more intensive agriculture, with numerous citrus orchards and farming retreats along Gingin Brook.
