= Wilbinga, Western Australia =

Wilbinga
- Town
- Coordinates: 31°25′00″S 115°39′00″E
- Country: Australia
- State: Western Australia
- LGA(s): Shire of Gingin
- Location: 69 km (43 mi) N of Perth

Government
  - State electorate(s): Moore
  - Federal division(s): Pearce

Area
  - Total: 133.3 km^{2} (51.5 sq mi)

Population
  - Total(s): 8 (SAL 2021)
- Postcode: 6041
Localities around Wilbinga
Caraban	Woodridge	Neergabby
Indian Ocean	Wilbinga	Yeal
Indian Ocean	Two Rocks	Yanchep

Wilbinga is a locality within the Shire of Gingin, just beyond the Perth metropolitan area's northern limit.

Wilbinga is bounded by the City of Wanneroo to the south, Wanneroo Road and the former Gingin Stock Route to the east, Woodridge to the north and the Indian Ocean to the west. Most of the suburb's area is contained within State Forest No. 65 (South) and, apart from Wanneroo Road, the locality contains no sealed roads. Tracks from Wilbinga Road provide access to isolated Wilbinga Beach. As at the 2021 Census, Wilbinga had a population of 8.

A fire lookout at Wabling Hill, originally constructed in 1959, provides views to the Moore River to the north, the ocean to the west, and generally over the state forest and small pine plantations nearby. Wabling Hill mallee (Eucalyptus argutifolia) is endemic to the area. Many 4WD clubs use the area as access to surrounding tracks. About 1 km south of Wilbinga beach are the shacks built by sheep farmers and then rebuilt by local citizens.
