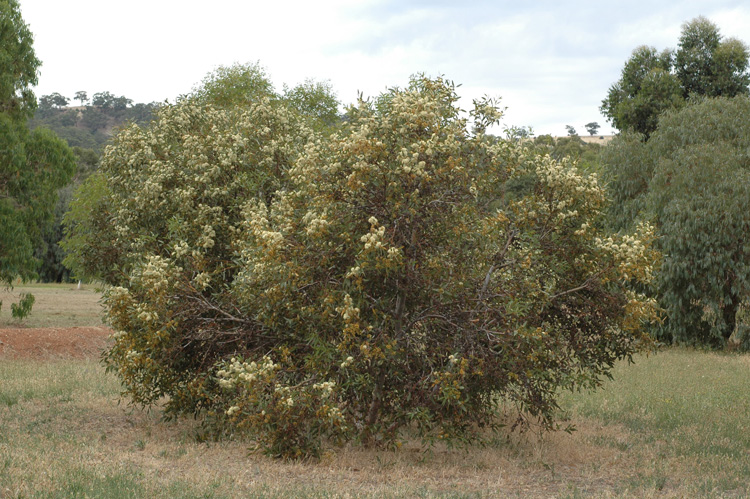

Conservation status
- Near Threatened (IUCN 3.1)

Scientific classification
- Kingdom: Plantae
- Clade: Tracheophytes
- Clade: Angiosperms
- Clade: Eudicots
- Clade: Rosids
- Order: Myrtales
- Family: Myrtaceae
- Genus: Eucalyptus
- Species: E. argutifolia

Binomial name
- Eucalyptus argutifolia Grayling & Brooker

= Eucalyptus argutifolia =

Wabling Hill mallee

Species of eucalyptus

Eucalyptus argutifolia, commonly known as Wabling Hill mallee or Yanchep mallee, is a mallee that is endemic to the south-west of Western Australia. It is a rare species with smooth bark, lance-shaped adult leaves, flower buds arranged in groups of seven or nine, white flowers and cylindrical to conical cup-shaped fruit.

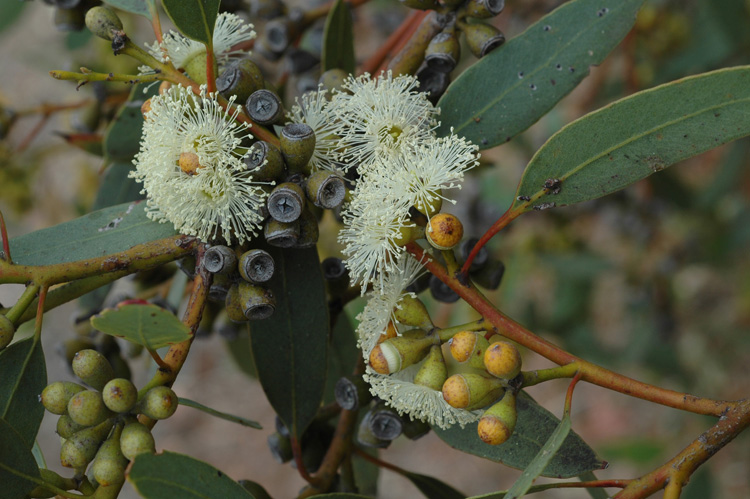
Foliage, flowers and fruit of E. argutifolia

== Description ==
Eucalyptus argutifolia is a mallee that grows to a height of about 4 m (10 ft) with smooth grey or pale copper-coloured bark. Leaves on young plants and on coppice regrowth are egg-shaped to more or less round, 40–70 mm (1.6–2.8 in) long, 30–55 mm (1–2 in) wide, glossy green and have a petiole. Adult leaves are lance-shaped, 73–120 mm (2.9–4.7 in) long and 12–30 mm (0.5–1 in) wide on a petiole 18–25 mm (0.7–1 in) long. The adult leaves are the same glossy green on both sides. Leaves intermediate between juvenile and adult are also usually present. The flower buds are arranged in groups of seven or nine on a thick peduncle 5–15 mm (0.2–0.6 in) long, the individual buds on a pedicel up to 5 mm (0.2 in) long or absent. Mature buds are oval, 7–11 mm (0.28–0.43 in) long and 4–6 mm (0.16–0.24 in) wide with a rounded operculum 3–4 mm (0.1–0.2 in) and about the same width as the floral cup. The flowers are white and appear in the autumn (March to April in areas where they occur naturally) and are followed by fruit that are cylindrical to conical or cup-shaped, 6–11 mm (0.24–0.43 in) long and 7–8 mm (0.28–0.31 in) wide.

== Taxonomy ==
Eucalyptus argutifolia was first formally described in 1992 by Peter Grayling and Ian Brooker from a specimen that was collected at Parrot Ridge near Yanchep in 1987. The description was published in the journal Nuytsia. The specific epithet (argutifolia) is derived from the Latin words argutus meaning "clear", "bright" or "sharp" and folium meaning "leaf", referring to the shiny adult leaves of this species.

It is placed in the Eucalyptus sub-genus Symphyomyrtus, section Dumaria, series Rufispermae.

== Distribution and habitat ==
Wabling Hill mallee occurs naturally on Wabling Hill and Parrot Ridge to the north of Yanchep and to the south of Seabird on shallow soils of limestone ridges, on slopes and in gullies.

== Conservation ==
This eucalypt is classified as "vulnerable" under the Australian Government Environment Protection and Biodiversity Conservation Act 1999 and as "Threatened Flora (Declared Rare Flora — Extant)" by the Department of Environment and Conservation (Western Australia). The main threats to the species include mining activities, inappropriate fire regimes, grazing and weed invasion.

== See also ==
- List of Eucalyptus species
