= Vergulde Draeck =

Dutch trading ship

Coordinates: 31°13.36′S 115°21.48′E

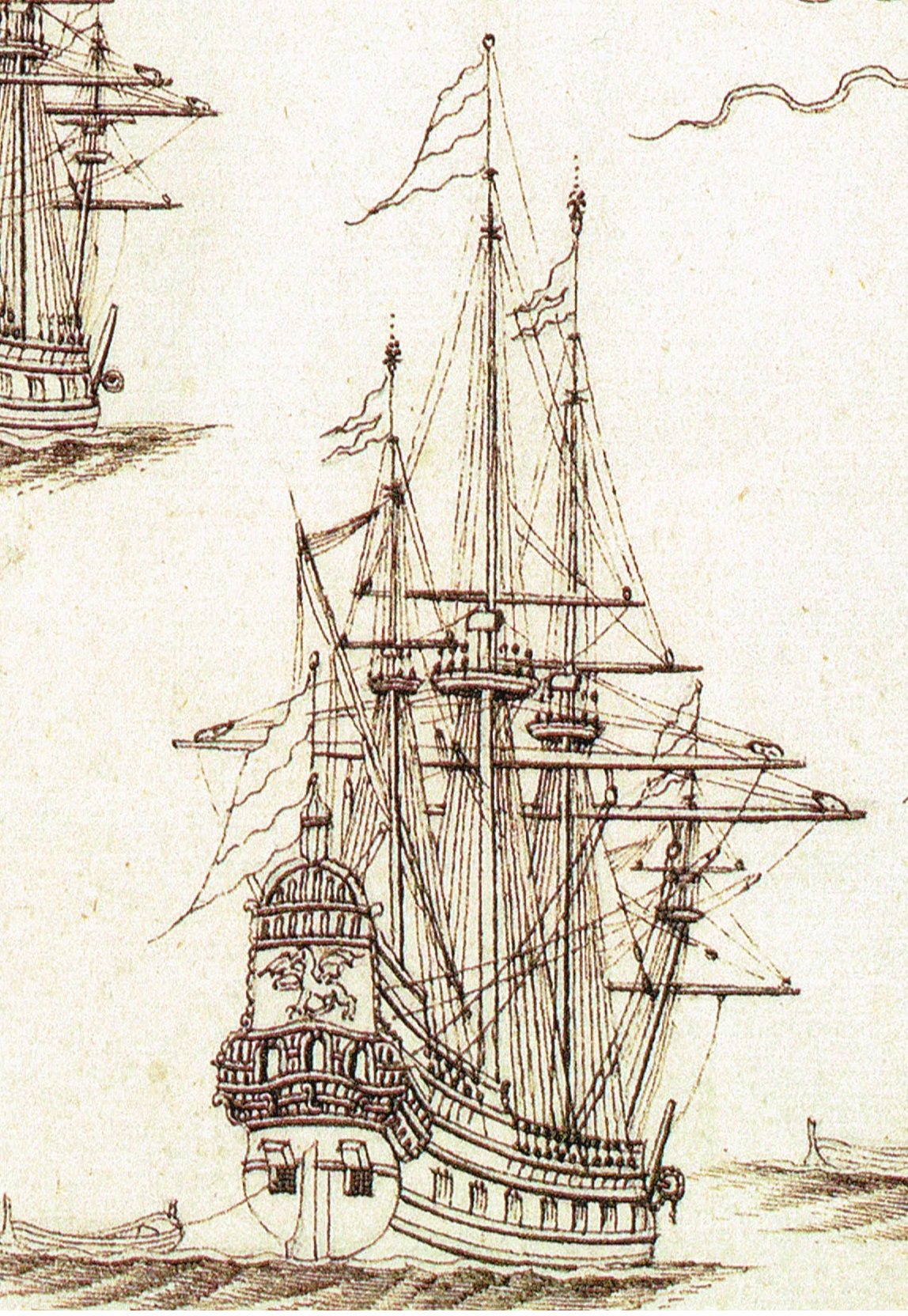
Image of what is believed to be Vergulde Draeck

Vergulde Draeck (pronounced [vɛrˈɣʏldə ˈdraːk]), also spelled Vergulde Draak and Vergulde Draek (meaning Gilt Dragon), was a 38.78-metre (127.2 ft), 260 ton jacht ('yacht') (Note: The word yacht is used in the VOC sense of a small ship, to differentiate them from the larger vessels of over 300 tons that we would think of as Indiamen.) bought in 1653 by the Dutch East India Company (Dutch: Vereenigde Oostindische Compagnie, commonly abbreviated to VOC). The ship was lost off the coast of Western Australia in 1656, with a minority of her crew reaching shore, and only seven subsequently reaching civilization.

The wreck was the first example of a VOC ship to be discovered off the coast of Australia. Archaeological investigations were started in 1972, with further work being done in 1981 and 1983. Though there is very little assembled hull structure remaining, what has been studied suggests that there was only one skin of structural hull planking, unlike the larger Indiamen, which usually had two layers. (Note: See Batavia (1628 ship) § Construction.) The sacrificial external layer of pine planking (a protection from teredo worm) shows marks from the wind-powered sawmill which cut them, providing evidence of the industrialisation of ship-building in the Netherlands.

== The wrecking of Vergulde Draeck ==
Vergulde Draeck was a ship purchased by the Amsterdam Chamber of the Dutch East India Company in 1653. It is likely that she was not a new ship when bought. On 4 October 1655, she departed Texel on her second voyage for the VOC. She was under the command of Pieter Albertszoon, and her destination was Batavia. The ship stopped at the Cape of Good Hope on 9 March 1656, having lost two crewmembers on the journey out. Vergulde Draeck left port four days later to continue on to Batavia.

On the night of the 28 April 1656, Vergulde Draeck struck a submerged coral reef midway between what are now the coastal towns of Seabird and Ledge Point, Western Australia. On board were 193 crew, eight boxes of silver coins worth 78,600 guilders (equivalent to €2.4 million in 2024) and trade goods to the value of 106,400 guilders equivalent to €3.2 million in 2024.

Of the 193 crew, 118 are believed to have perished. The initial 75 survivors, including the ship's captain Pieter Albertszoon, and the under steersman, made it to shore. They had with them the ship's boat, a schuyt, along with a small amount of provisions and stores washed on shore.

== Arrival in Batavia ==
On 7 May 1656, approximately nine days after the loss of Vergulde Draeck, the under steersman and six crew members were dispatched to Batavia to summon help. They carried with them letters written by the crew which described the loss of the schuyt, the crew's decision to await rescue from Batavia, and their steadfast faith in the Lord God.

After a journey of some 1,400 nautical miles (2,600 km; 1,600 mi), lasting 41 days, with little water, little food and suffering from exposure, the under steersman and six crew arrived at Batavia. The alarm was raised and the search for the survivors of Vergulde Draeck and her cargo began.

== Rescue attempts ==
Dutch East India Company mounted a number of rescue attempts once the loss was reported.

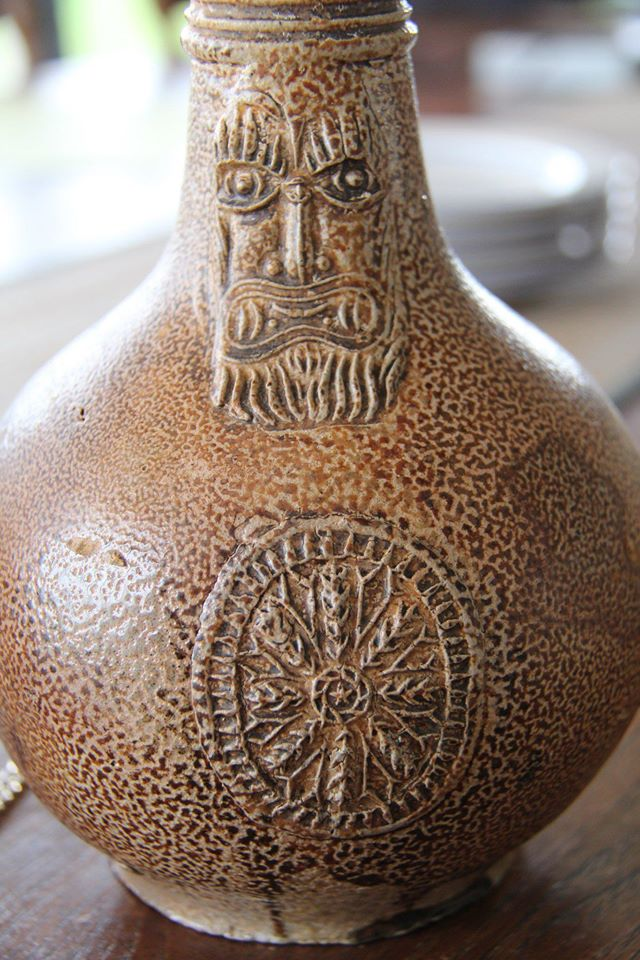
Bartmann jug found on the wreck of Vergulde Draeck

=== Goede Hoop and Witte Valck (1656) ===
On 7 June 1656, two rescue vessels, Goede Hoop and Witte Valck, were dispatched from Batavia. Large storms off the Western Australian coast meant that both ships were unsuccessful.

Witte Valck failed to land men on the coast.

On 18 July 1656, Goede Hoop managed to disembark men upon the shoreline; however, they lost three men along the coast who had wandered into the bush, before losing another eight men who went in search of them.

No sign of the survivors or wreckage was found.

=== Vinck (1657) ===
On 23 April 1657, Vinck in the process of setting sail from the Cape of Good Hope was instructed to search for the survivors on her passage to Batavia.

No sign of the survivors or wreckage was found.

=== Waeckende Boey and Emeloordt (1658) ===
On 1 January 1658, Waeckende Boey and Emeloordt were dispatched from Batavia. This time the rescue attempt was made in the more favourable summer months.

On 23 February 1658, Captain Volkersen of Waeckende Boey sighted the Western Australian coastline, perhaps being the first European to sight what is today Rottnest Island, though it is possible Houtman may have sighted it in 1619.

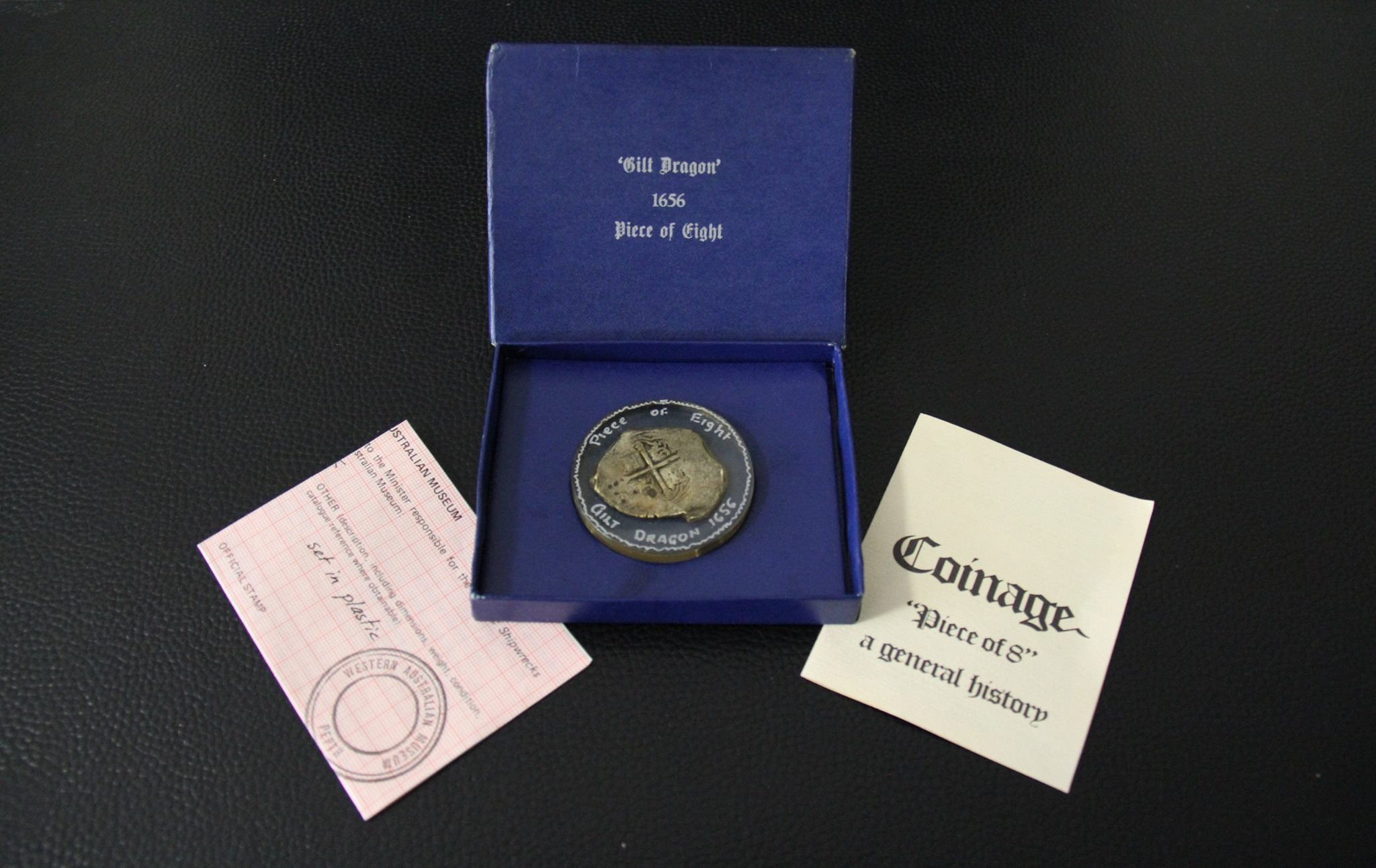
Coin from Vergulde Draeck

On 26 February 1658, a shore party from Waeckende Boey returning from the coast recorded the discovery of wreckage believed to be of Vergulde Draeck. Most notable was a plank circle, a collection of some 12 to 13 planks placed in a circular fashion, dug into the beach sand with their ends facing skyward.

During the various searches, a shore party from Waeckende Boey led by Abraham Leeman became separated from the others. Bad weather prevented the party from returning to the ship; after four days they were presumed lost and Waeckende Boey departed. Leeman and three others sailed to Batavia in a small boat; his diary in the National Maritime Museum in Amsterdam recounts his experience. The town of Leeman, Western Australia was later named after him.

On 9 March 1658, Captain Jonck of Emeloordt managed to send a small party to land. Upon returning, the shore party reported having seen three Aboriginal persons of tall stature who attempted to communicate with them using basic hand signals. This story of first contact was a peaceful exchange, likely with the Yuet people of Western Australia.

=== Emmenhorn (1659) ===
A further rescue attempt was made in 1659 by Emmenhorn but no sign of survivors or wreckage was found.

== Discovery of Vergulde Draeck ==
The wreck of Vergulde Draeck was eventually discovered on 14 April 1963 south of Ledge Point, about 100 kilometres (62 mi) north of Perth.

The identity of the official discoverers of Vergulde Draeck has been a contentious issue over many years, though it is generally accepted that the wreck was found by John Cowen; Jim, Alan and Graeme Henderson; and Alan Robinson. An alternative claim was made by Robinson in his In Australia Treasure is not for the Finder.

Artifacts from the wreckage were salvaged in 1963 and are kept in the Fremantle Maritime Museum in Australia. They include lead, ivory, amber, coral and 10,000 coins.

== Archaeological investigation ==
The wreck was put under control of archaeologists in 1972. Despite the loss of archaeological integrity caused by those salvaging artefacts for financial gain, useful information was gained to add to the small number of recorded excavations of VOC ships. (Note: VOC wrecks are a favoured target for treasure hunting expeditions, since they often carried large amounts of bullion and jewels to pay for the spices they bought in the Far East. The consequence is that many have had items of monetary value retrieved in a way that ignores and destroys archaeological evidence. Of 50 VOC shipwrecks that have been identified around the world, 29 have been systematically destroyed by treasure hunters. The majority of these had the permission of the Dutch government, the legal heir to the VOC.) The sternpost was covered with protective layers of lead sheeting covered by copper sheeting. Some of the copper had been recovered by treasure hunters before 1972, making interpretation of this aspect difficult. The hull construction method was the "bottom first" tradition, which was used in Dutch shipyards after frame-first carvel construction had become common elsewhere in northern Europe. (Note: As well as clinker construction, a "planking first" or "shell first" method of building a hull and carvel, which usually refers to a "frame first" construction sequence, Dutch shipyards of the 17th century continued to use the "bottom-based" technique which had been used to build cogs and earlier craft. The bottom-based tradition involves the shaping and positioning of the lower hull planks, from the keel up to the turn of the bilge. They are temporarily fastened together with cleats, clamps and levers that pull the boards against the keel. The shaping of the individual planks determines the shape of that part of the hull. Only then is the first part (the floor) of each of the frames made and fastened to the planks and the keel. The next section of frame (the first futtock) is then fastened to the planking (but not to the floor – it is therefore termed a "floating futtock") and planking is then continued up the hull in the "plank-on-frame" method used in carvel. The bottom-based tradition arguably goes back to Romano-Celtic boats built in northern Europe.) Below the waterline, the hull was sheathed with a layer of pine planking, applied over a layer of goat hair mixed with tar – this would slow the effect of teredo worm. Study of the small amount of timber excavated from the wreck shows the regular saw marks of windmill-powered sawmills. This technology was a Dutch innovation which greatly reduced the cost of construction of ships and helped make them the leading shipbuilders in northern Europe in the 16th and 17th centuries.

== Letter written by the survivors of the Vergulde Draeck ==
In March 2015, Steve Caffery, of Gilt Dragon Research Group, claimed to have discovered a copy of a letter carried by the seven survivors to Batavia in 1656.
