= Moore River National Park =

National park in Western Australia

- IUCN category II (national park)
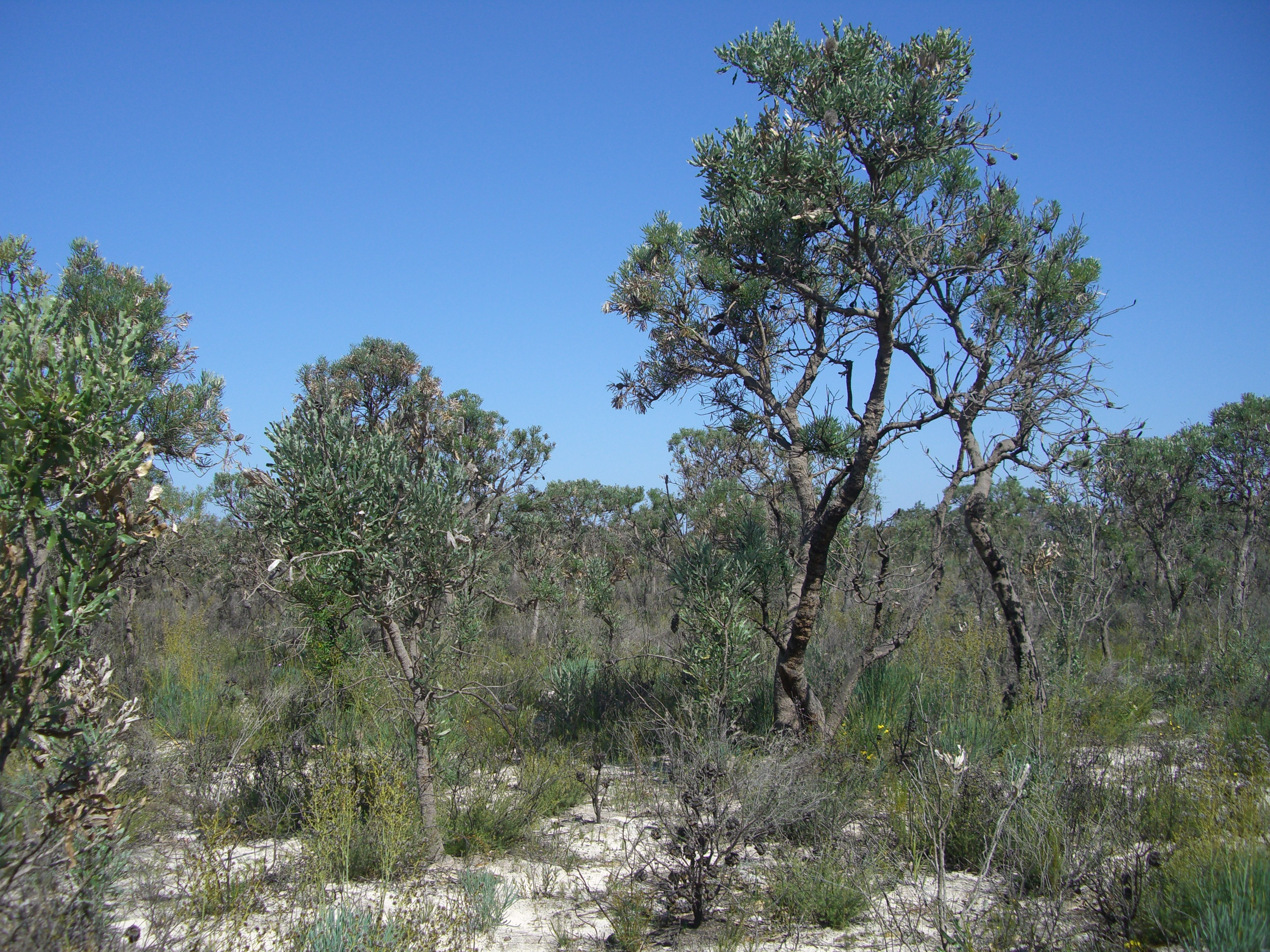

- Location within Western Australia
- Location: Western Australia
- Nearest city: Regans Ford
- Coordinates: 31°05′12″S 115°38′47″E
- Area: 172.54 km^{2} (66.62 sq mi)
- Established: 1969
- Governing body: Department of Parks and Wildlife
- Website: Official website

Moore River National Park is a national park in the Wheatbelt region of Western Australia, 95 km north of Perth. The Moore River runs through the park on its way to the Indian Ocean where the township of Guilderton is situated.

The park is situated west of the Brand Highway near Regans Ford and consists of mainly banksia heathland. There are no facilities in the park.

There is also an eponymous locality of the Shire of Gingin, but the boundaries of the national park and the locality are not identical.

== See also ==
- List of protected areas of Western Australia
