= Guilderton, Western Australia =

Guilderton
- Town
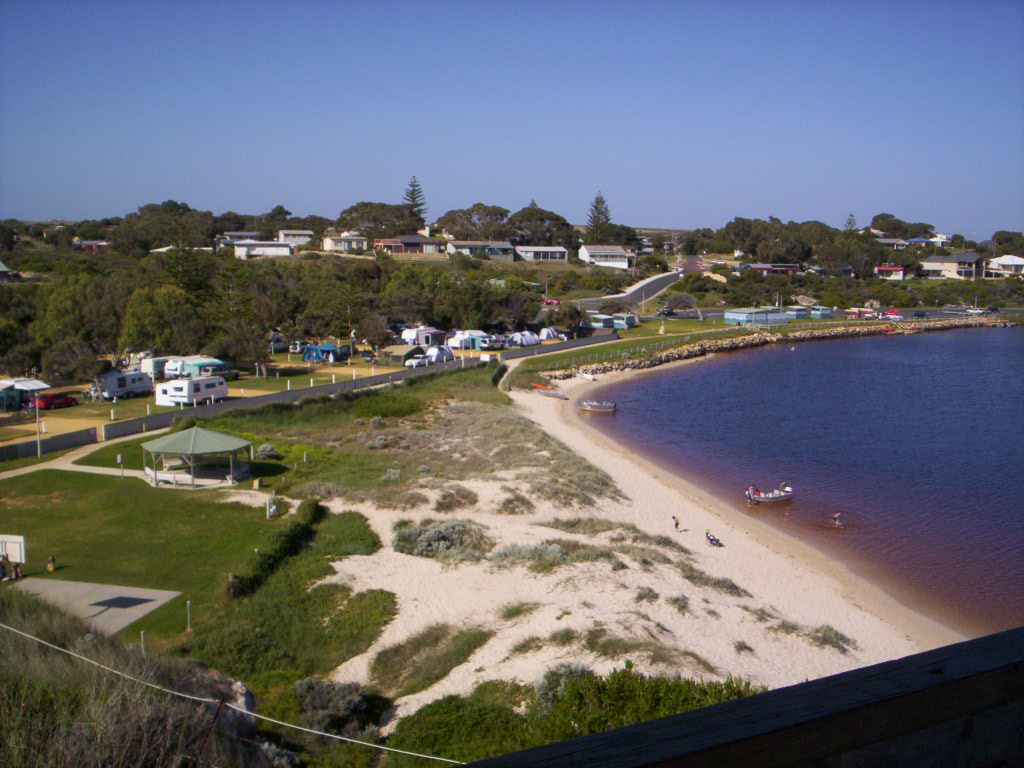
- Lookout view of Guilderton at the Moore River mouth

- Coordinates: 31.35°S 115.50°E
- Country: Australia
- State: Western Australia
- LGA(s): Shire of Gingin
- Location: 94 km (58 mi) north of Perth; 39 km (24 mi) south east of Lancelin; 38 km (24 mi) west of Gingin
- Established: 1951

Government
  - State electorate(s): Mid-West
  - Federal division(s): Pearce

Area
  - Total: 8.6 km^{2} (3.3 sq mi)

Population
  - Total(s): 158 (SAL 2021)
- Postcode: 6041
Localities around Guilderton
Seabird	Gabbadah	Gabbadah
Indian Ocean	Guilderton	Woodridge
Indian Ocean	Caraban	Caraban

Guilderton is a small coastal town north of Perth, Western Australia at the mouth of the Moore River in the Shire of Gingin.

It was originally known as Gabbadah, an Aboriginal term meaning "mouthful of water" until its gazetting as a town in 1951. The river mouth regularly opens and closes depending on the seasons, and alternates between a closed lagoon and a tidal estuary.

The town is a popular holiday destination for Perth residents, who commonly refer to it as Moore River.

== History ==
The area has been used as a camping and recreation spot since 1905 when the residents of nearby Gingin petitioned for a road to be constructed to the area. The area was declared as a recreation area in 1907.

In 1931, 40 silver guilder coins from the 17th century were found in the sandhills near the entrance to the Moore River – thus the name Guilderton. The coins were thought to be from the wreck of the Dutch ship, Vergulde Draeck (Gilt Dragon) that had foundered on a reef north of the river-mouth near Ledge Point in 1656.

Soldiers used the area during World War II both for rest and recreation and as a base for horseback beach patrols.

The township was gazetted and named Guilderton on 28 November 1951; the area was known locally as Moore River until this time.

In 1983, the Federal Department of Transport established a lighthouse at Wreck Point, Guilderton near the river mouth at a cost of $240,000. This was the last brick tower style lighthouse built in Australia.
