= Seabird, Western Australia =

Seabird
- Town
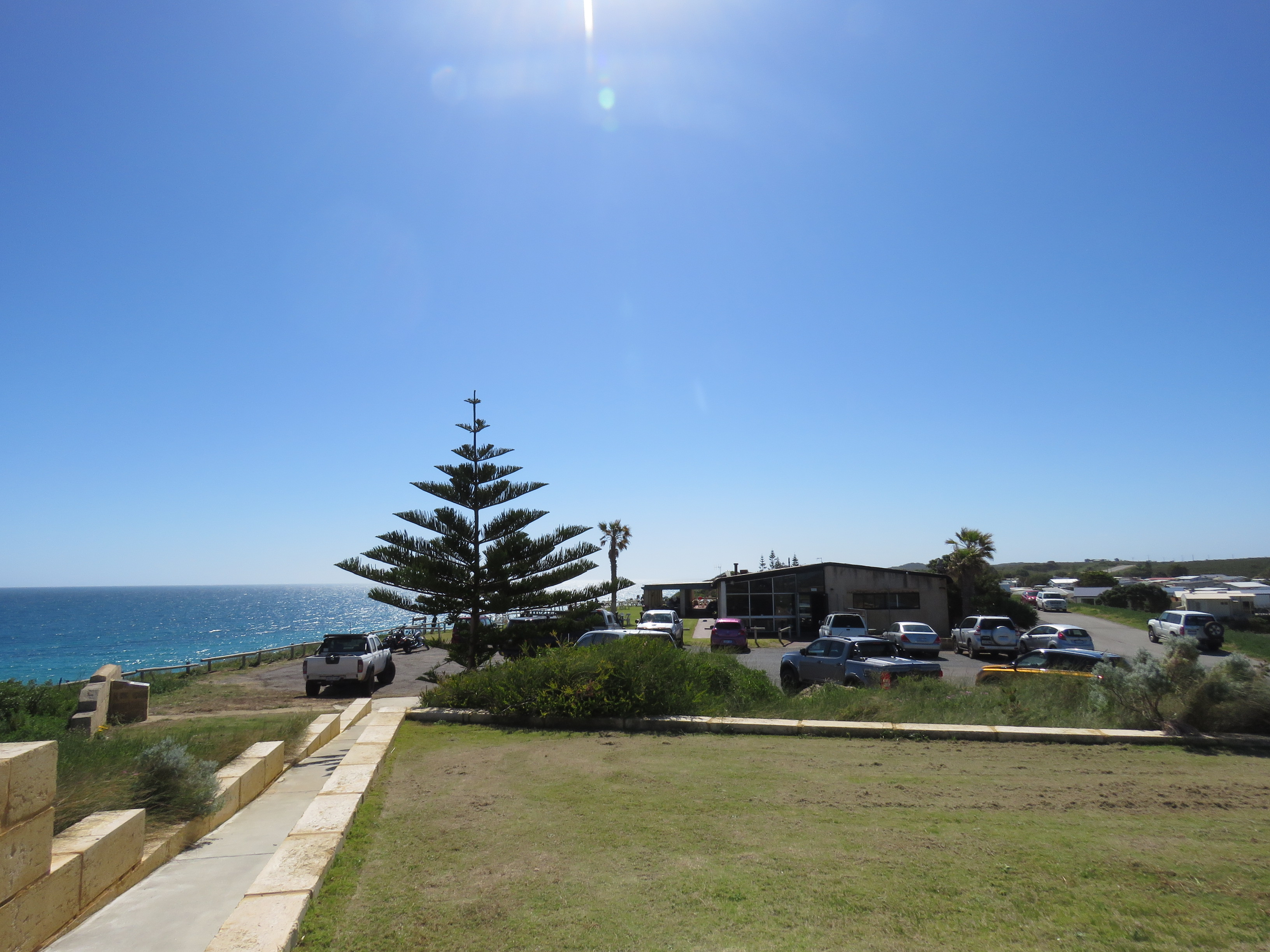
- Seabird Tavern overlooking the coast in September 2021

- Coordinates: 31.265°S 115.43°E
- Country: Australia
- State: Western Australia
- LGA(s): Shire of Gingin
- Location: 100 km (62 mi) north of Perth; 38 km (24 mi) south east of Lancelin; 53 km (33 mi) west of Gingin
- Established: 1968

Government
  - State electorate(s): Moore
  - Federal division(s): Pearce

Area
  - Total: 12.8 km^{2} (4.9 sq mi)

Population
  - Total(s): 107 (SAL 2021)
- Postcode: 6042

Seabird is a small coastal town north of Perth, Western Australia in the Shire of Gingin, situated halfway between Two Rocks and Lancelin overlooking the Indian Ocean.

Seabird is a popular holiday and retirement spot, similar to surrounding settlements such as Guilderton and Ledge Point, but has also become infamous for its struggles with coastal erosion.

== History ==
The area that would become Seabird was first founded on sand dunes as a series of squatter shacks used by rock lobster fisherman during the 1950s. In 1965 the decision was made to gazette the area as a townsite named "Chalon", named after the hometown of the botanist Jean-Baptiste Leschenault de La Tour. The proposed name was unpopular with residents and upon being gazetted in 1968 was renamed "Seabird". Sea Bird (two words) was the name of a schooner which shipwrecked in the area in 1874 and had lent its name to a nearby pastoral lease.

Seabird's fragile location on the foredunes overlooking the beach resulted in a 1970s report by the Coastal Townsites Committee of the now-disbanded Town Planning Department recommending no further development of the settlement shortly after its gazettal. This came to fruition after significant erosion of up to 40 metres (130 ft) resulted in Turner Street, a road built to service the town's beachfront properties, collapsing into the ocean. In 2016 lobbying by residents resulted in a A$2 million sea wall being constructed to protect the exposed properties for another 10–20 years. This was also complemented by the addition of 2,400 native seedlings to help further stabilise the area behind the sea wall.
