= Jurien Bay, Western Australia =

Jurien Bay
- Town
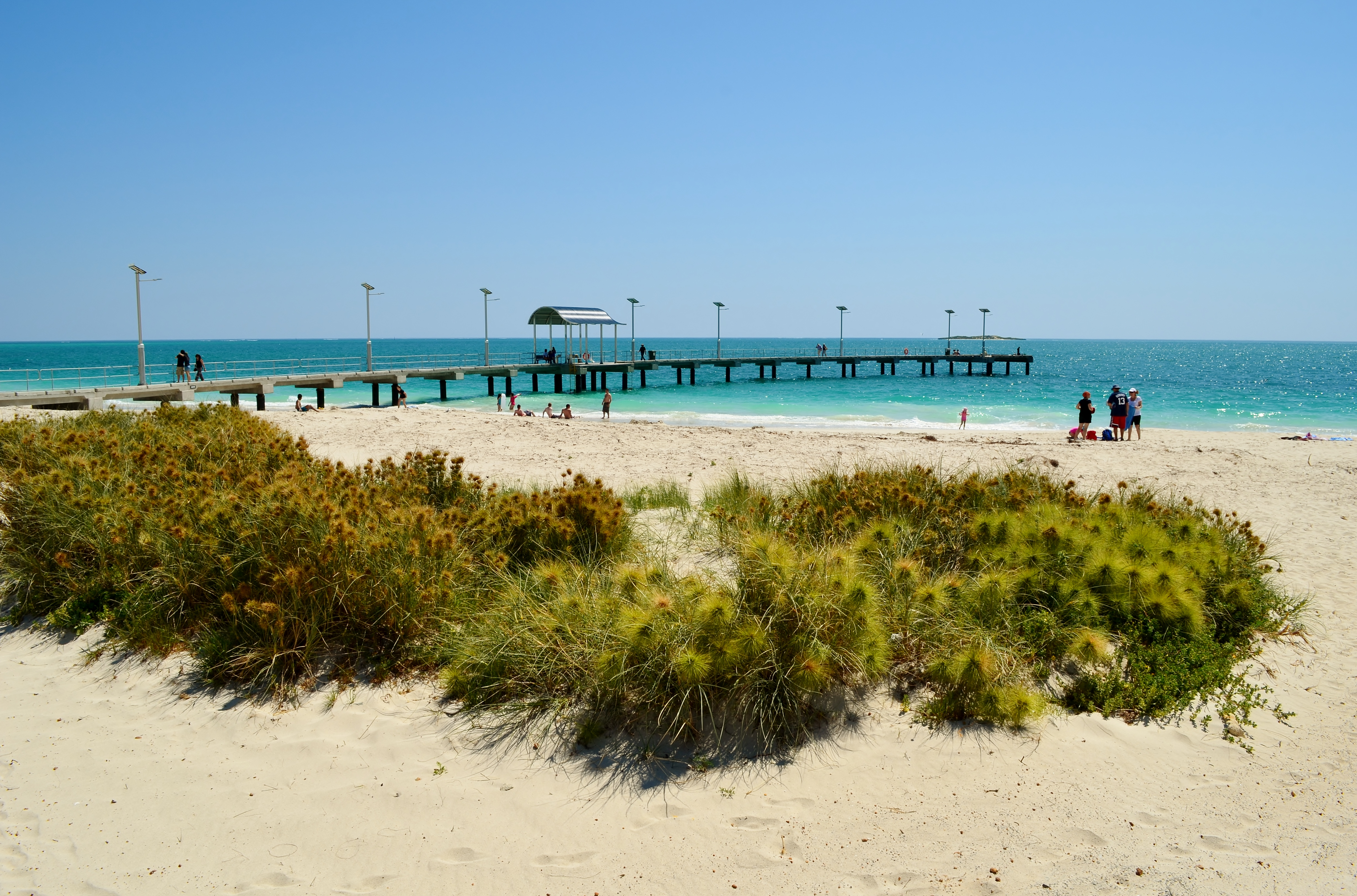
- Jurien Bay Jetty, 2012

- Interactive map of Jurien Bay
- Coordinates: 30.297°S 115.042°E
- Country: Australia
- State: Western Australia
- LGA: Shire of Dandaragan
- Location: 220 km (140 mi) from Perth
- Established: 1950s

Government
  - State electorate: Mid-West
  - Federal division: Durack

Area
  - Total: 525.3 km^{2} (202.8 sq mi)
- Elevation: 2 m (6.6 ft)

Population
  - Total: 1,600 (UCL 2021)
- Postcode: 6516
- Mean max temp: 25.2 °C (77.4 °F)
- Mean min temp: 13.3 °C (55.9 °F)
- Annual rainfall: 503.4 mm (19.82 in)

Jurien Bay is a coastal town in the Wheatbelt region of Western Australia, 220 kilometres (137 mi) north of Perth facing the Indian Ocean.

== History ==
The coastline around Jurien Bay was first known to Europeans in the 17th century. In 1801–03, an expedition under the command of Nicolas Baudin sailed along the Western Australian coast. Louis de Freycinet, a cartographic surveyor on the expedition, named Jurien Bay after Charles Marie Jurien (1763–1836) of the French naval administration. The area was visited by a number of English explorers from 1822 onwards. The bay was first surveyed by Captain James Harding, the harbourmaster of Fremantle, in 1865, with a more extensive survey made by Staff Commander W. E. Archdeacon R.N. in 1875.

The first settlement was established in the mid-1850s by Walter Padbury. A jetty was constructed in 1885–87 due to the success of pastoralism. In the early 1900s, a temporary fishing village was built around the Jurien jetty and the coastal waters were used for catching dhufish, snapper and groper. Permanent residences were only built in the 1950s; however the buildings were only corrugated iron shanties instead of properly-built dwellings. Initially the settlement struggled to grow due to a poor and unreliable water supply and the isolation of the area at that time.

The townsite was surveyed and was gazetted as Jurien Bay on 21 December 1956; it was renamed Jurien in 1959, but reverted to its original name in 1999. Crayfish (also known as Western Rock Lobster) are abundant in the area, and the town's development soon became influenced by the crayfish industry. New jetties, factories and an airstrip were constructed so that crayfish goods could be flown south to Perth. Crayfishing has now become a multimillion-dollar industry, sending goods regularly to Japan and the United States.

The Jurien Bay "Blessing of the Fleet" festival commenced in the mid-1990s to commemorate the start of the crayfishing season in November each year. Following the opening of Indian Ocean Drive (the coastal route linking Perth) in 2010, the event was re-badged as the Indian Ocean Festival.

Today, the town is experiencing a house building boom, as its population and popularity as a holiday destination grow. The principal employers in the town are housing and building construction, retail, tourism, and crayfishing. Local residents claim that the town's population more than doubles during the holiday season. The completion of Indian Ocean Drive, has afforded faster access to the Perth Metropolitan area as well as the neighbouring towns of Leeman, Cervantes and Green Head. The town has many facilities including a community resource centre, supermarket, police station, family resource and child daycare centre, skatepark and sporting facilities, recreational jetty, restaurants, small boat harbour and marina, sealed and lit airstrip and a medical centre; it also has a district high school, and is visited twice a week by a bus service from Perth operated by Integrity Coach Lines.

In 2016 the Turquoise Way trail (shared use path) was extended southwards from the town to the Hill River so as to create a recreational cycling and walk/run course of 14.2 km.

Jurien Bay is the seat of government for the Shire of Dandaragan and is the largest community in that shire.

== Geography ==
Jurien Bay lies on Indian Ocean Drive, a coastal route completed in 2010; on this route Jurien Bay is 220 km north of Perth and 195 km south of Geraldton. The town of Jurien Bay is surrounded by many national parks and reserves. Just east of Jurien Bay is the biodiversity hotspot that is the Lesueur National Park. The town lies adjacent to the Jurien Bay Marine Park. Jurien Bay has an airport.

=== Climate ===
Jurien Bay experiences a warm Mediterranean climate (Köppen climate classification Csa).

Climate data for Jurien Bay (1991–2020 averages, 1968–2023 extremes)
Month	Jan	Feb	Mar	Apr	May	Jun	Jul	Aug	Sep	Oct	Nov	Dec	Year
Record high °C (°F)	45.7 (114.3)	44.7 (112.5)	44.0 (111.2)	37.3 (99.1)	32.1 (89.8)	28.4 (83.1)	26.2 (79.2)	30.5 (86.9)	35.2 (95.4)	38.2 (100.8)	41.6 (106.9)	46.0 (114.8)	46.0 (114.8)
Mean daily maximum °C (°F)	30.1 (86.2)	30.8 (87.4)	29.7 (85.5)	26.7 (80.1)	23.7 (74.7)	21.1 (70.0)	19.8 (67.6)	20.2 (68.4)	21.4 (70.5)	23.8 (74.8)	26.3 (79.3)	28.8 (83.8)	25.2 (77.4)
Mean daily minimum °C (°F)	17.3 (63.1)	18.1 (64.6)	16.9 (62.4)	14.3 (57.7)	11.8 (53.2)	10.4 (50.7)	9.4 (48.9)	9.5 (49.1)	9.9 (49.8)	11.7 (53.1)	13.9 (57.0)	15.9 (60.6)	13.3 (55.9)
Record low °C (°F)	8.2 (46.8)	8.8 (47.8)	5.6 (42.1)	1.7 (35.1)	2.7 (36.9)	−1.0 (30.2)	0.5 (32.9)	1.3 (34.3)	1.3 (34.3)	2.7 (36.9)	4.0 (39.2)	6.6 (43.9)	−1.0 (30.2)
Average precipitation mm (inches)	6.8 (0.27)	8.8 (0.35)	17.1 (0.67)	26.0 (1.02)	67.9 (2.67)	93.4 (3.68)	112.3 (4.42)	79.2 (3.12)	43.5 (1.71)	23.4 (0.92)	18.6 (0.73)	7.3 (0.29)	503.4 (19.82)
Average precipitation days (≥ 0.2mm)	2.1	2.5	3.4	6.1	10.7	13.3	16.1	14.5	11.5	7.4	5.0	2.9	95.5
Average afternoon relative humidity (%)	63	60	61	61	62	65	68	64	66	64	62	61	63
Source 1: Bureau of Meteorology, Jurien Bay (1991–2020)
Source 2: Bureau of Meteorology, Jurien Bay (all years)

== Demographics ==
At the 2011 census, Jurien Bay had a population of 1,507, which represented over one-third of the total population of the Shire of Dandaragan and an increase of over 300 people over the 2006 Census population of 1,175. It was surveyed within the Moore region, which includes five local council areas to the north of Perth with a population of 14,038, and has grown consistently over recent years.

Jurien Bay residents had a median age of 42, compared to the Moore regional average of 40 and the state average of 37. 21.29% of the population were under 16 years of age at the census, while 26.92% (above the regional average of 20.52% or the state average of 16.64%) were over 60 years of age. The median individual income in the area was $453 per week, while 1.49% of the population had incomes above $1,000 per week. The main industry sector in Jurien Bay was construction (13.29%) followed by hospitality (12.20%), retail (11.33%), manufacturing (8.06%), education (7.19%) and agriculture (5.66%)—representing significant declines in retail and agriculture since the 2001 census. 3.92% were employed by the mining industry. This profile differed significantly from both Dandaragan and the region, where over 28% were involved with agriculture.

Nearly all of Jurien Bay's 514 occupied dwellings were separate homes, although a small number of townhouses and units were located in the northern section of the town. The caravan park in Jurien accommodated 59 residents in 38 dwellings. In common with the Shire of Dandaragan generally but at odds with the region, a high number – 407 – of Jurien Bay's dwellings were unoccupied. The average house price in Jurien Bay in the 12 months to January 2008 was $476,250, significantly higher than the regional average.

The population of Jurien Bay are predominantly Australian-born, with 77.7% of its residents being born in Australia as at the 2001 census. The second most prevalent birthplace was the United Kingdom at 5.79%. 3.33% of Jurien's population reported one or both parents of Italian birth. The most popular religious affiliations in descending order in the 2001 census were Anglican, no religion, Roman Catholic, Uniting, and Presbyterian. The Daughters of Charity have a parish ministry based in Jurien Bay.

== Politics ==
Polling place statistics are shown below, with the votes from Jurien Bay in the federal and state elections as indicated.

2007 federal election Source: AEC
Liberal	58.7%
The Nationals	16.6%
Labor	16.1%
Greens	4.34%
Independent	1.28%

2021 state election Source: WAEC
The Nationals	33.9%
Labor	30.8%
Liberal	21.2%
SFF	4.00%
One Nation	2.76%

2004 federal election Source: AEC
Liberal	70.1%
Labor	11.2%
The Nationals	6.49%
One Nation	3.83%
Greens	3.69%

2005 state election Source: WAEC
Liberal	68.8%
Labor	12.7%
The Nationals	9.37%
One Nation	3.66%
Greens	3.22%

2001 federal election Source: AEC
Liberal	63.5%
Labor	14.1%
One Nation	11.5%
The Nationals	3.56%
Greens	2.99%

2001 state election Source: WAEC
Liberal	36.8%
One Nation	23.6%
The Nationals	17.5%
Labor	17.3%
Greens	4.75%

1998 federal election Source: AEC
Liberal	54.8%
One Nation	15.9%
Labor	12.2%
The Nationals	7.50%
Greens	3.32%

1996 state election Source: WAEC
Liberal	77.5%
Labor	22.5%

== Cadet corps ==
Jurien Bay District High School is the base of the Emergency Services Cadet Corps managed by the Western Australia Department of Fire and Emergency Services and Cadets.
