= Shire of Gingin =

Local government area in the Wheatbelt region of Western Australia

Coordinates: 31°20′28″S 115°54′29″E

- Local government area
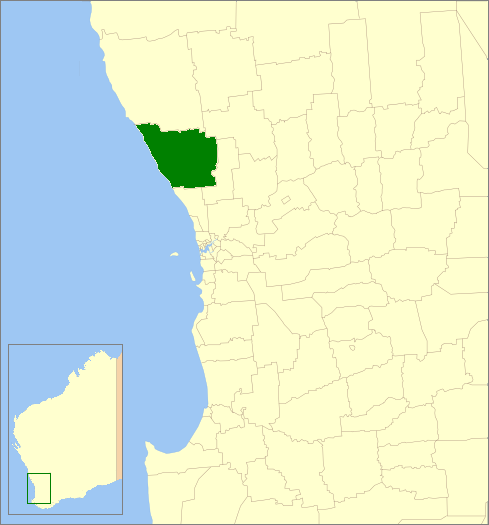
- Location in Western Australia

- Interactive map of Shire of Gingin
- Country: Australia
- State: Western Australia
- Region: Wheatbelt
- Established: 1893
- Council seat: Gingin

Government
  - Shire President: Linda Balcombe
  - State electorate: Mid West
  - Federal division: Durack

Area
  - Total: 3,211.1 km^{2} (1,239.8 sq mi)

Population
  - Total: 5,576 (LGA 2021)
- Website: Shire of Gingin
LGAs around Shire of Gingin
Indian Ocean	Dandaragan	Victoria Plains
Indian Ocean	Shire of Gingin	Chittering
Indian Ocean	Wanneroo	Chittering

The Shire of Gingin is a local government area in the Wheatbelt region of Western Australia, just beyond the northern fringe of the Perth metropolitan area. The Shire covers an area of 3,211 square kilometres (1,240 sq mi) and its seat of government is the town of Gingin.

== History ==
The Gingin Road District was established on 12 January 1893. 11 days later, on 23 February 1893, the township of Gingin separated as the Municipality of Gingin. The municipality merged back into the road district on 26 June 1903.

On 1 July 1961, it became a shire following the passage of the Local Government Act 1960, which reformed all remaining road districts into shires.

== Wards ==
The Shire had been divided into several wards, most with one councillor: This was changed to a no ward system in 2013.

== Towns and localities ==
The towns and localities of the Shire of Gingin with population and size figures based on the most recent Australian census:

Locality	Population	Area	Map
Bambun	60 (SAL 2021)	54.8 km^{2} (21.2 sq mi)	
Beermullah	109 (SAL 2021)	201.6 km^{2} (77.8 sq mi)	
Boonanarring	32 (SAL 2021)	197.7 km^{2} (76.3 sq mi)	
Breera	29 (SAL 2021)	55 km^{2} (21 sq mi)	
Breton Bay	0 (SAL 2021)	190.5 km^{2} (73.6 sq mi)	
Caraban	25 (SAL 2021)	44.4 km^{2} (17.1 sq mi)	
Coonabidgee	126 (SAL 2021)	44.8 km^{2} (17.3 sq mi)	
Cowalla	54 (SAL 2021)	109.8 km^{2} (42.4 sq mi)	
Cullalla	12 (SAL 2021)	119.6 km^{2} (46.2 sq mi)	
Gabbadah	764 (SAL 2021)	65.3 km^{2} (25.2 sq mi)	
Gingin	902 (SAL 2021)	9.5 km^{2} (3.7 sq mi)	
Ginginup	33 (SAL 2021)	72.2 km^{2} (27.9 sq mi)	
Granville	38 (SAL 2021)	44.8 km^{2} (17.3 sq mi)	
Guilderton	158 (SAL 2021)	8.6 km^{2} (3.3 sq mi)	
Karakin	239 (SAL 2021)	141.1 km^{2} (54.5 sq mi)	
Lancelin	786 (SAL 2021)	44 km^{2} (17 sq mi)	
Ledge Point	231 (SAL 2021)	31.3 km^{2} (12.1 sq mi)	
Lennard Brook	209 (SAL 2021)	41.1 km^{2} (15.9 sq mi)	
Mindarra	33 (SAL 2021)	221.5 km^{2} (85.5 sq mi)	
Moondah	34 (SAL 2021)	42.4 km^{2} (16.4 sq mi)	
Moore River National Park ‡	0 (SAL 2021)	219.7 km^{2} (84.8 sq mi)	
Muckenburra	219 (SAL 2021)	74.6 km^{2} (28.8 sq mi)	
Neergabby	268 (SAL 2021)	111.9 km^{2} (43.2 sq mi)	
Nilgen	248 (SAL 2021)	255 km^{2} (98 sq mi)	
Orange Springs	30 (SAL 2021)	106.8 km^{2} (41.2 sq mi)	
Red Gully	32 (SAL 2021)	217.8 km^{2} (84.1 sq mi)	
Seabird	107 (SAL 2021)	12.8 km^{2} (4.9 sq mi)	
Wanerie	137 (SAL 2021)	120.1 km^{2} (46.4 sq mi)	
Wilbinga	8 (SAL 2021)	133.3 km^{2} (51.5 sq mi)	
Woodridge	639 (SAL 2021)	17.3 km^{2} (6.7 sq mi)	
Yeal	0 (SAL 2016)	202.1 km^{2} (78.0 sq mi)	

- ( ‡ indicates boundaries of national park and locality are not identical)

== Population ==
Historical population

Year	Pop.	±% p.a.
1911	669	—
1921	686	+0.25%
1933	1,063	+3.72%
1947	751	−2.45%
1954	757	+0.11%
1961	769	+0.22%
1966	1,021	+5.83%
1971	1,169	+2.74%
1976	1,255	+1.43%

Year	Pop.	±% p.a.
1981	1,875	+8.36%
1986	2,589	+6.67%
1991	2,708	+0.90%
1996	3,178	+3.25%
2001	3,803	+3.66%
2006	4,318	+2.57%
2011	4,685	+1.64%
2016	5,217	+2.17%
2021	5,576	+1.34%

== Heritage-listed places ==
As of 2023, 131 places are heritage-listed in the Shire of Gingin, of which 13 are on the State Register of Heritage Places.
