= Ledge Point, Western Australia =

Ledge Point
- Town
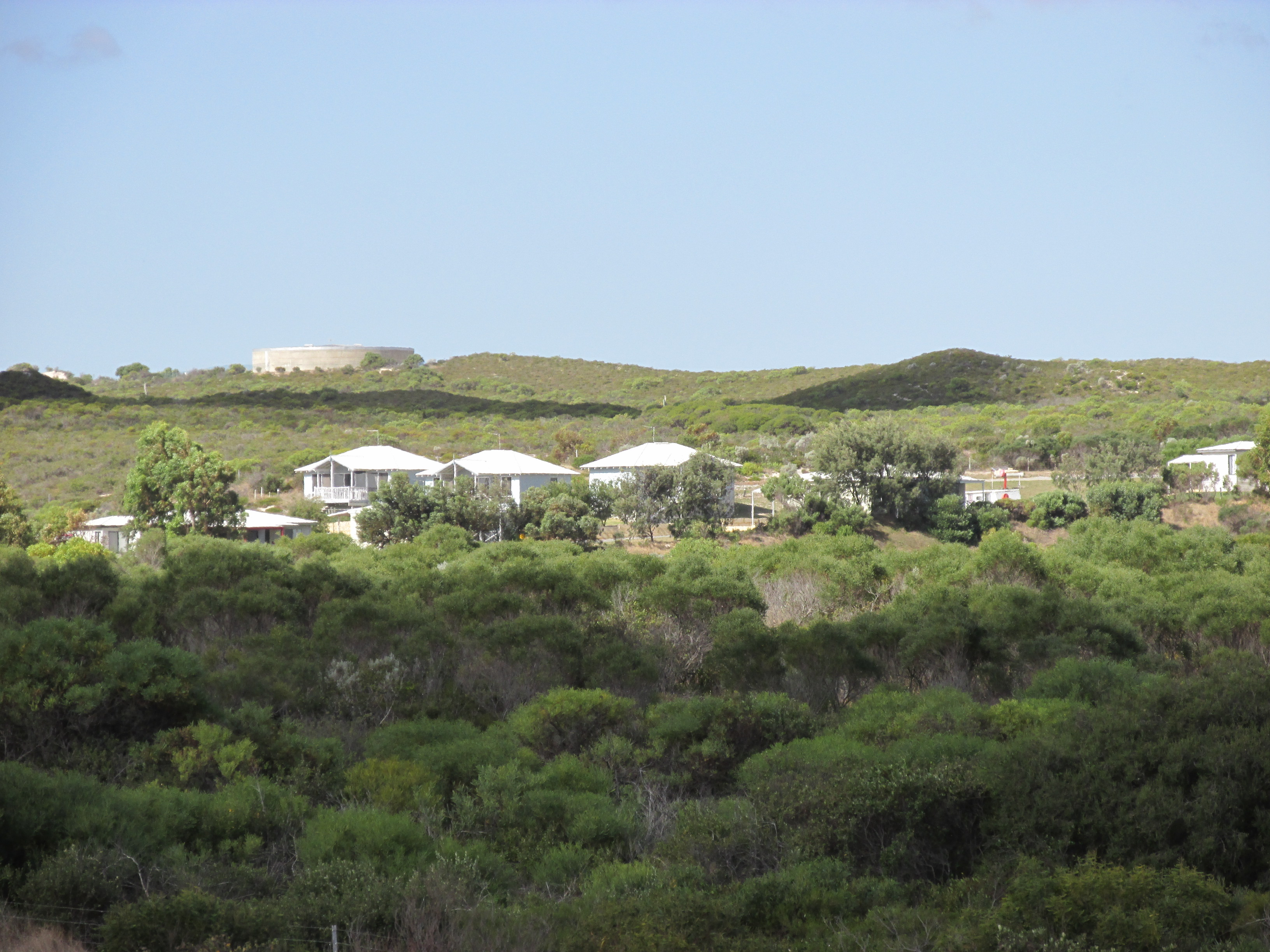
- Looking west from Ledge Point over surrounding bushland and water tank, 2015

- Interactive map of Ledge Point
- Coordinates: 31.11°S 115.38°E
- Country: Australia
- State: Western Australia
- LGA: Shire of Gingin
- Location: 105 km (65 mi) north of Perth, Western Australia; 10 km (6.2 mi) south of Lancelin; 79 km (49 mi) south west of Moora
- Established: 1955

Government
  - State electorate: Moore
  - Federal division: Pearce

Area
  - Total: 31.3 km^{2} (12.1 sq mi)
- Elevation: 10 m (33 ft)

Population
  - Total: 231 (SAL 2021)
- Postcode: 6043

Ledge Point is a small coastal township 105 km north of Perth, Western Australia. It was established to service the local fishing and crayfishing industries.

== History ==
The town's name derives from the nearby coastal feature of the same name, a series of rocky ledges on the point that was first described in a 1875 hydrographic survey. In 1937, the Gingin Road Board requested that land be set aside in the area for camping and recreation purposes.

By 1952, three squatters' shacks had been built in the reserve and, after a road was completed into the area in 1953, more people began to request land leases. The government decided to subdivide the area in 1954 and sell blocks for retirees and holiday housing. The town was gazetted in 1955.

The area is well known as a windsurfing venue, and in January each year the prestigious Ledge Point to Lancelin Windsurfing Classic draws competitors from around the world.

In 1963, divers discovered the wreck of the Dutch East India Company ship Vergulde Draeck ('gilt dragon'), which sank on 28 April 1656 after striking reef near Ledge Point. It was one of the earliest wrecks of a European ship on Australian shores. In 1972, a full expedition was mounted to systematically explore the remained of the ship and its fittings. Damage by looters had left little intact but, over several months, a quantity of artefacts was recovered, which are now displayed at maritime museums in Geraldton and Fremantle.

The area is also known for the 1983 wreck of the Jackup oil drilling rig Key Biscayne, which toppled over in storms about 10 nautical miles (19 km) offshore whilst under tow.

== See also ==
- History of Western Australia
