= Lancelin, Western Australia =

Lancelin
- Town
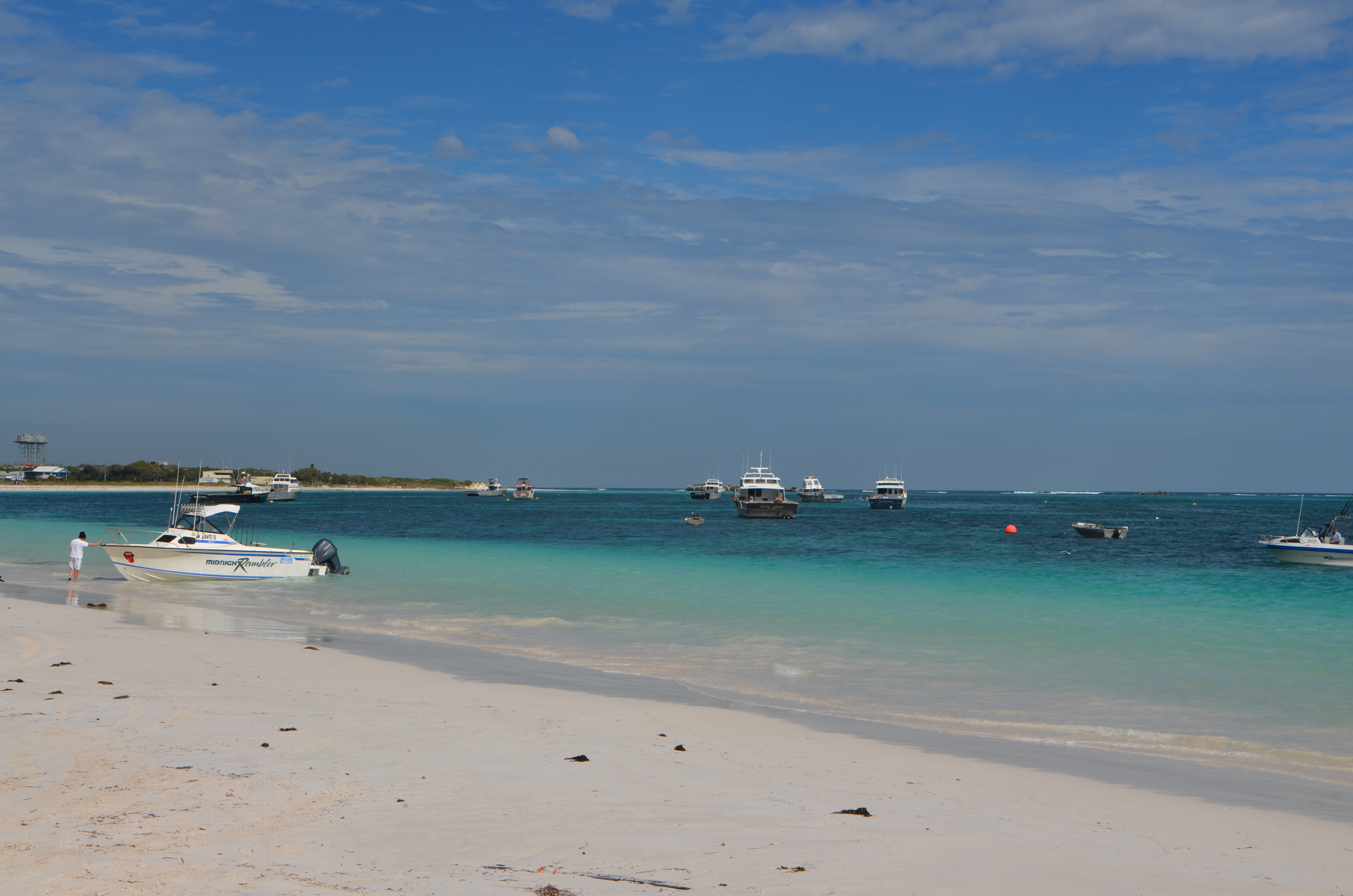
- View of the Indian Ocean, south of the Lancelin pier

- Interactive map of Lancelin
- Coordinates: 31.014°S 115.33°E
- Country: Australia
- State: Western Australia
- LGA: Shire of Gingin
- Location: 115 km (71 mi) NNW of Perth; 77 km (48 mi) SW of Moora; 84 km (52 mi) S of Jurien Bay

Government
  - State electorate: Moore
  - Federal division: Pearce

Area
  - Total: 44 km^{2} (17 sq mi)
- Elevation: 6 m (20 ft)

Population
  - Total: 746 (UCL 2021)
- Postcode: 6044

Lancelin is a small fishing and tourist town 127 kilometres (79 mi) north of Perth, Western Australia. It is within the Shire of Gingin at the end of Lancelin Road, and a few kilometres away from the scenic highway Indian Ocean Drive (State Route 60).

Lancelin is close to the shipwreck site of Vergulde Draeck (lit. 'Gilt Dragon') that was wrecked on rocks close to shore in 1656. The town has a permanent population of over 600, and swells to 2,500 during the peak holiday period around Christmas and New Year.

== History ==
The town's name originates from nearby Lancelin Island which was named after P. J. Lancelin, the scientific writer of Nicolas Baudin during his 1801 expedition.

The area was initially a holiday camping place through the 1940s and holiday shacks were probably built in the area during this time, but interest in the area grew as it was designated as a possible port to be utilised by the crayfish or lobster fishery. One such vessel used at Lancelin was Trixen in the 1960s, now preserved in the Western Australian Maritime Museum.

Lancelin was gazetted in 1950 and was originally named Wangaree, the Aboriginal word for 'fish'. The area was renamed in 1953 after a request from the Gingin Road Board.

Two sounding rockets were launched from Lancelin for solar research during the solar eclipse of June 20, 1974.

The Australian military has used the Lancelin Defence Training Area to the north of the town for training exercises since the 1940s.

== Recreational ==
Two islands are located just off the coast in the bay; Edwards Island and Lancelin Island.

Lancelin Island Nature Reserve, 500 metres (1,600 ft) offshore, is managed for the conservation of flora and fauna. The island is an important sanctuary for a variety of breeding seabirds, for several resident landbirds and lizards and for resting sea lions. A variety of marine, wading and land birds may be observed. You can go to this island by boat and it is a popular summer trip. There is a walkway along the island that visitors can walk on to see the wildlife.

Edwards island is prohibited to travel to since it is a high class nature reserve.

Kitesurfing and windsurfing are popular in the ocean off Lancelin. Sandboarding and riding on a dune buggy, motorbike or four-wheel drive are popular on the beaches and on the dunes behind the town.

Every March the annual colour blast event is held on the beach.

The Lancelin District Community Association is the holder of the Guinness World Record for the largest off-road convoy.

== Erosion ==
As of 2025, many of the town's businesses and houses are at risk due to coastal erosion, with much of the townsite located in close proximity to the coastline. An estimated 25 metres of town side beach was lost between 2020 and 2025 due to erosion.

== Climate ==
Lancelin has a hot-summer mediterranean climate that is consistently warm throughout the year, resembling a typical subtropical climate but with a dry summer.

Climate data for Lancelin
Month	Jan	Feb	Mar	Apr	May	Jun	Jul	Aug	Sep	Oct	Nov	Dec	Year
Record high °C (°F)	46.0 (114.8)	45.3 (113.5)	43.6 (110.5)	37.5 (99.5)	32.0 (89.6)	29.4 (84.9)	27.7 (81.9)	31.0 (87.8)	34.1 (93.4)	39.0 (102.2)	40.7 (105.3)	43.2 (109.8)	46.0 (114.8)
Mean daily maximum °C (°F)	29.1 (84.4)	29.8 (85.6)	28.5 (83.3)	25.6 (78.1)	22.8 (73.0)	20.3 (68.5)	19.3 (66.7)	19.4 (66.9)	20.5 (68.9)	22.6 (72.7)	24.9 (76.8)	27.4 (81.3)	24.2 (75.6)
Mean daily minimum °C (°F)	17.6 (63.7)	18.1 (64.6)	16.8 (62.2)	14.6 (58.3)	12.4 (54.3)	10.8 (51.4)	9.9 (49.8)	9.9 (49.8)	10.5 (50.9)	12.1 (53.8)	14.2 (57.6)	16.2 (61.2)	13.6 (56.5)
Record low °C (°F)	8.6 (47.5)	8.3 (46.9)	6.3 (43.3)	4.4 (39.9)	3.3 (37.9)	1.6 (34.9)	1.5 (34.7)	0.1 (32.2)	1.0 (33.8)	3.2 (37.8)	4.4 (39.9)	4.4 (39.9)	0.1 (32.2)
Average precipitation mm (inches)	11.0 (0.43)	14.1 (0.56)	16.0 (0.63)	30.4 (1.20)	79.4 (3.13)	117.4 (4.62)	119.0 (4.69)	91.6 (3.61)	56.2 (2.21)	28.2 (1.11)	20.6 (0.81)	8.3 (0.33)	587.8 (23.14)
Average precipitation days	2.2	2.1	3.6	6.9	11.5	15.1	16.7	15.0	12.3	8.0	5.3	2.9	101.6
Average relative humidity (%)	61	60	60	62	61	63	65	64	64	62	62	61	62

== Gallery ==
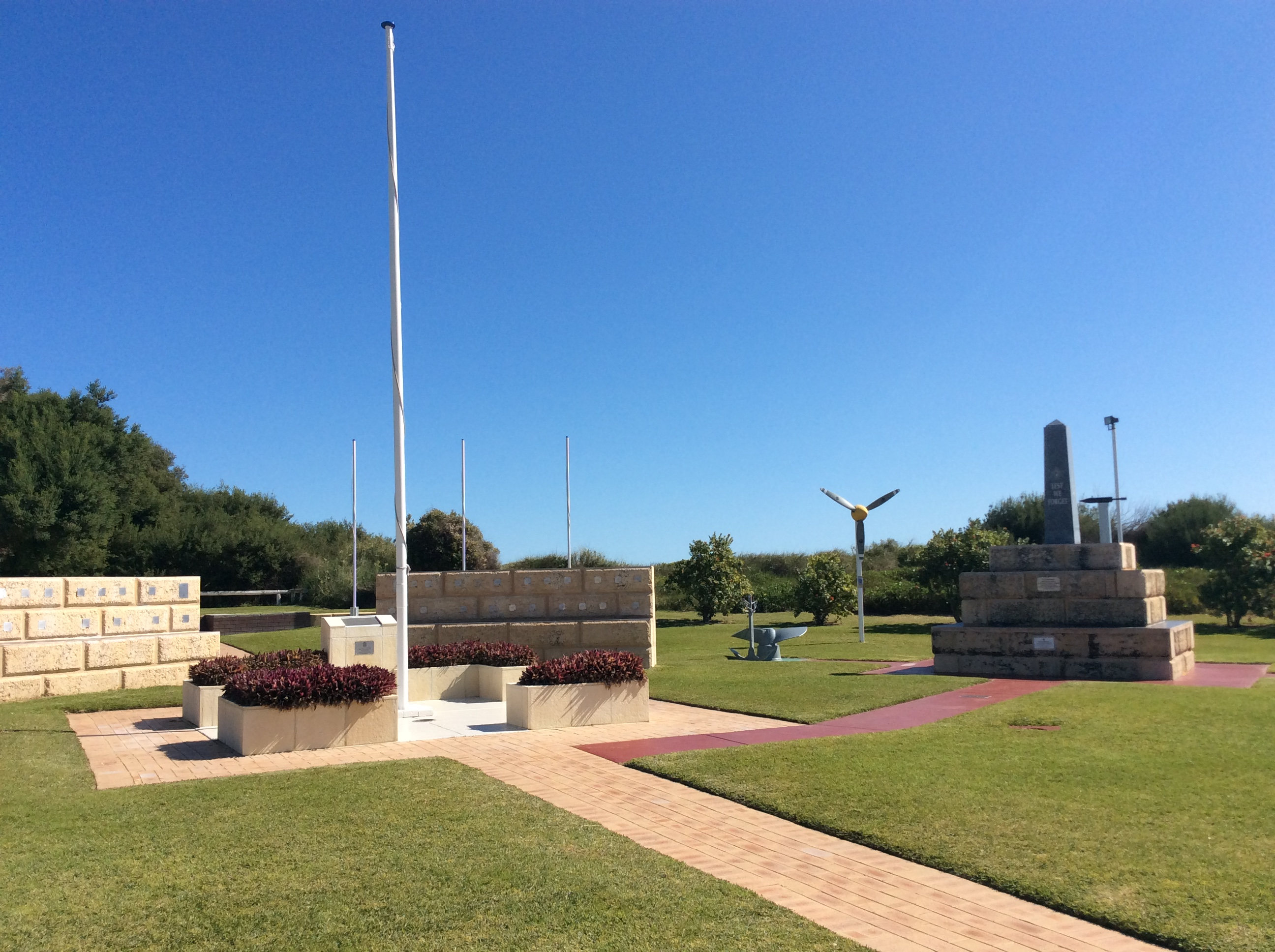
Lancelin War Memorial

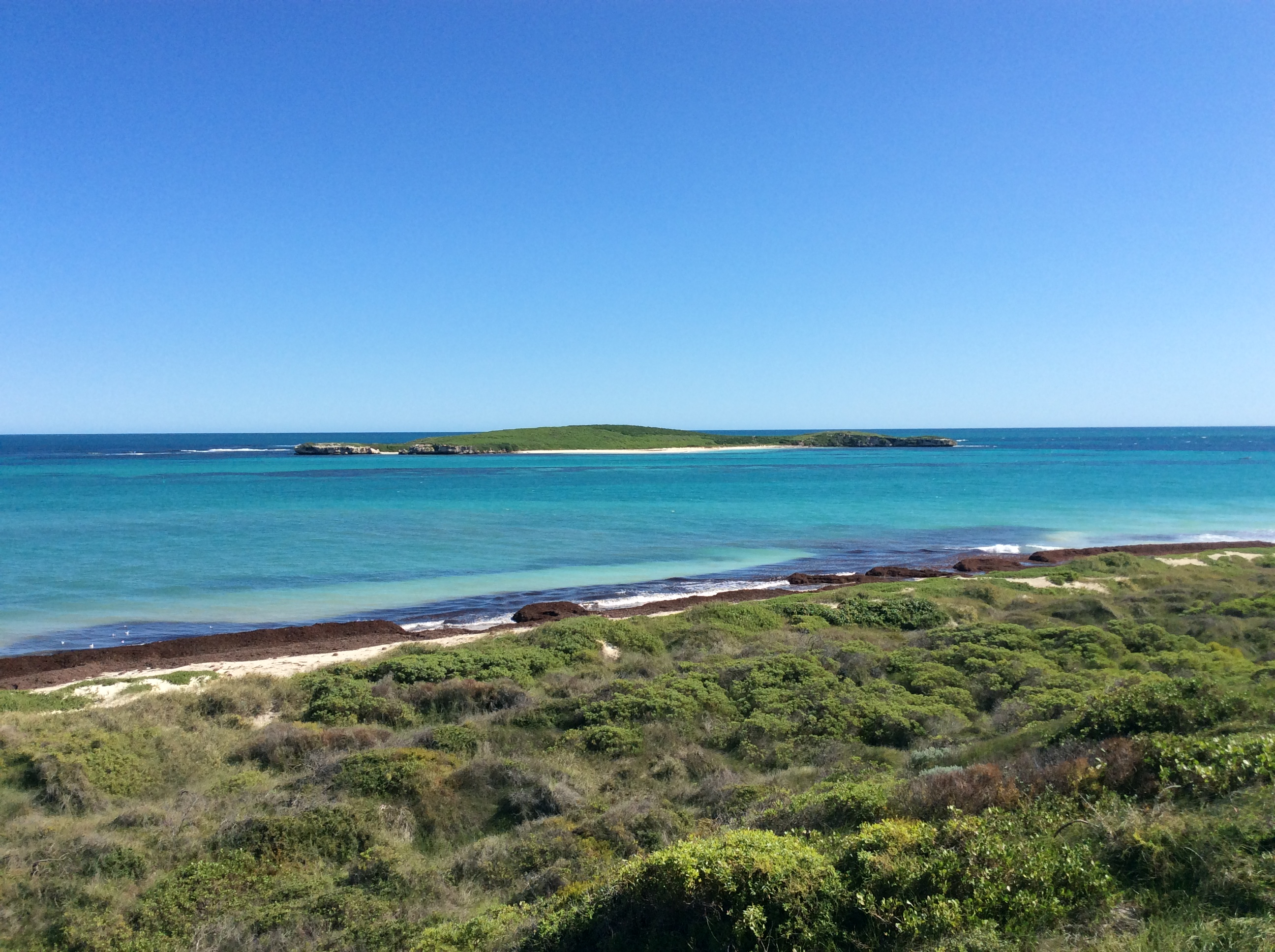
Lancelin Island viewed from the lookout

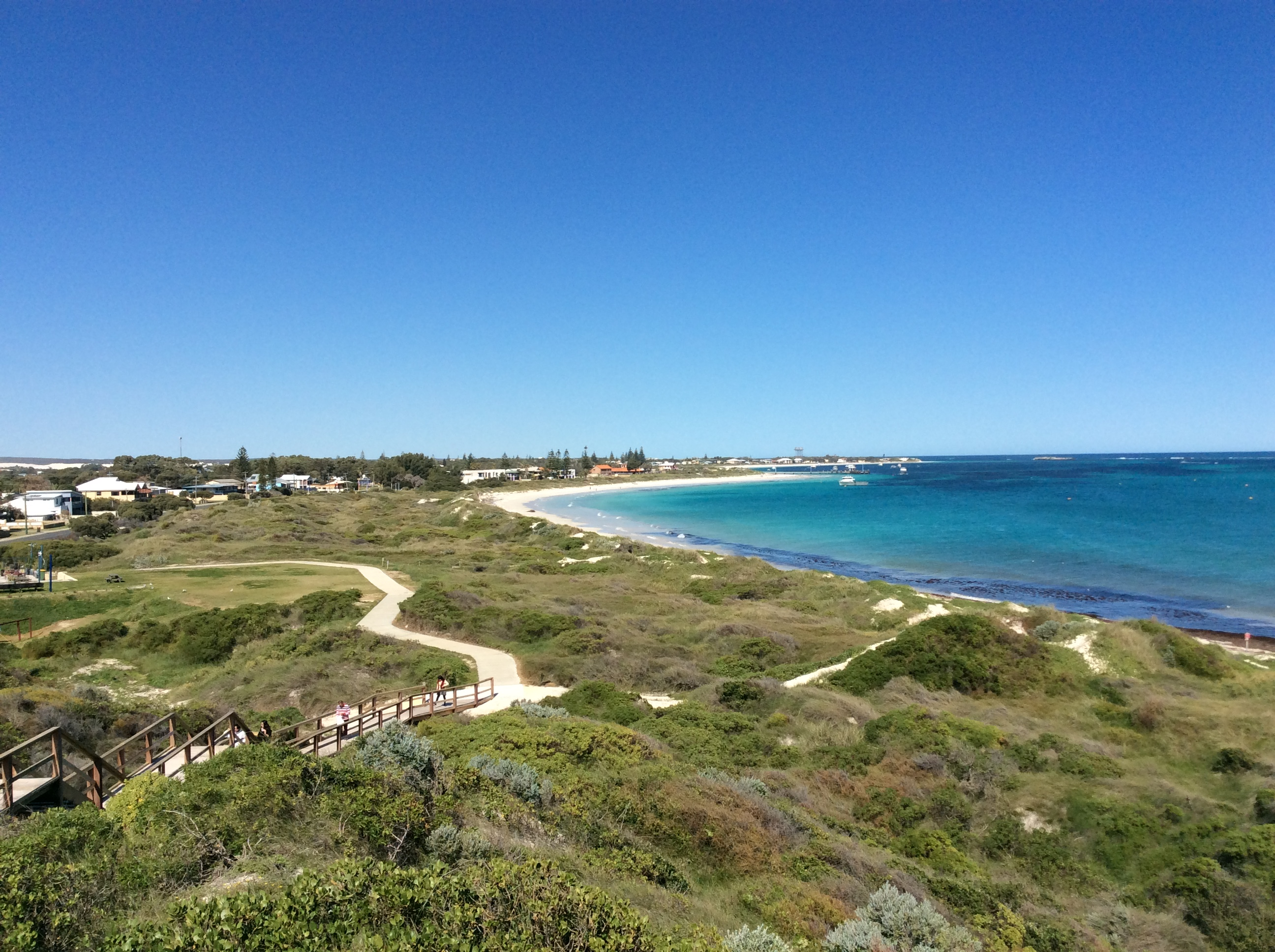
View from Lancelin Lookout southward towards the town centre and the jetty

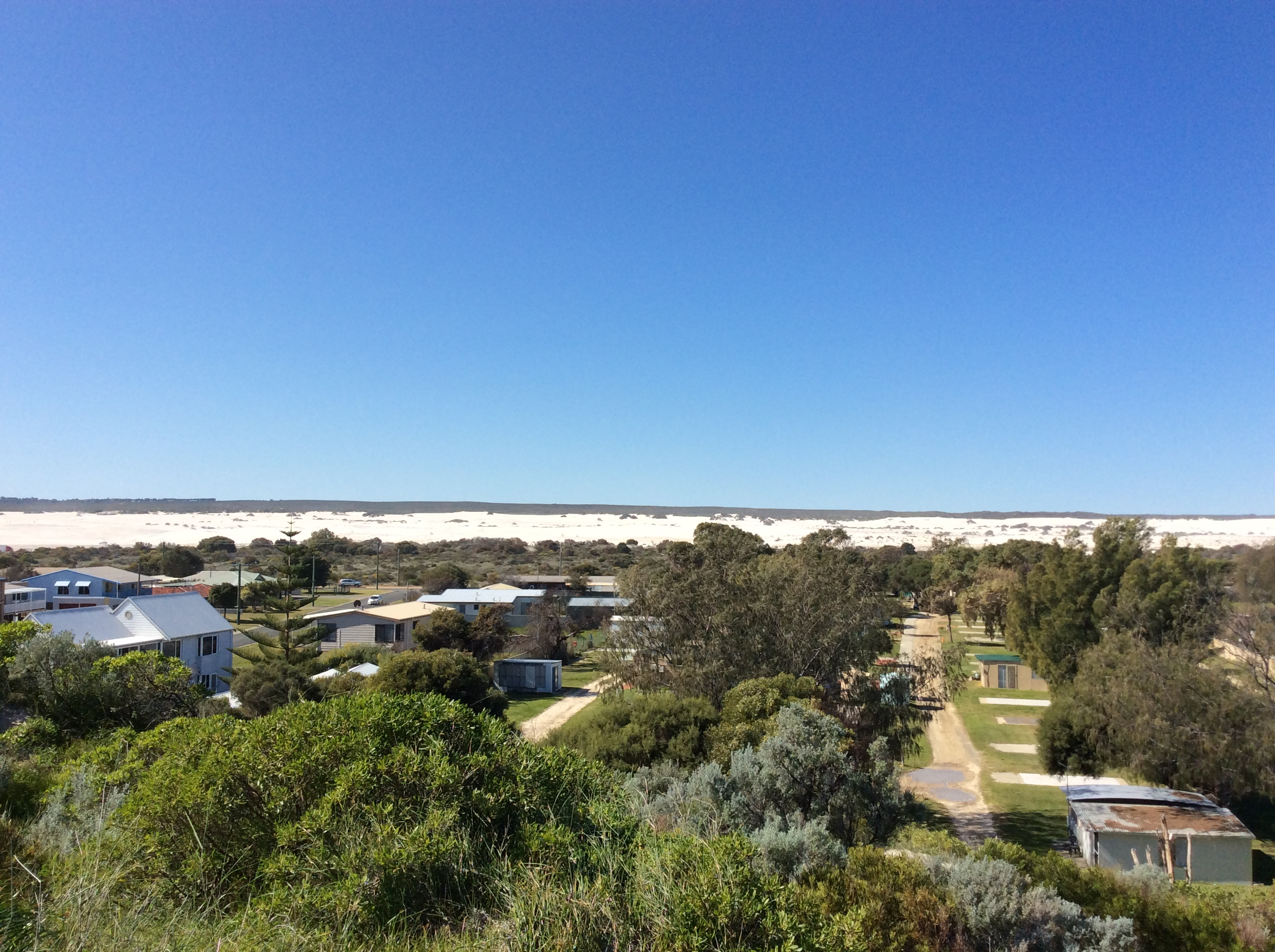
Sand dunes to the northeast of Lancelin viewed from the lookout

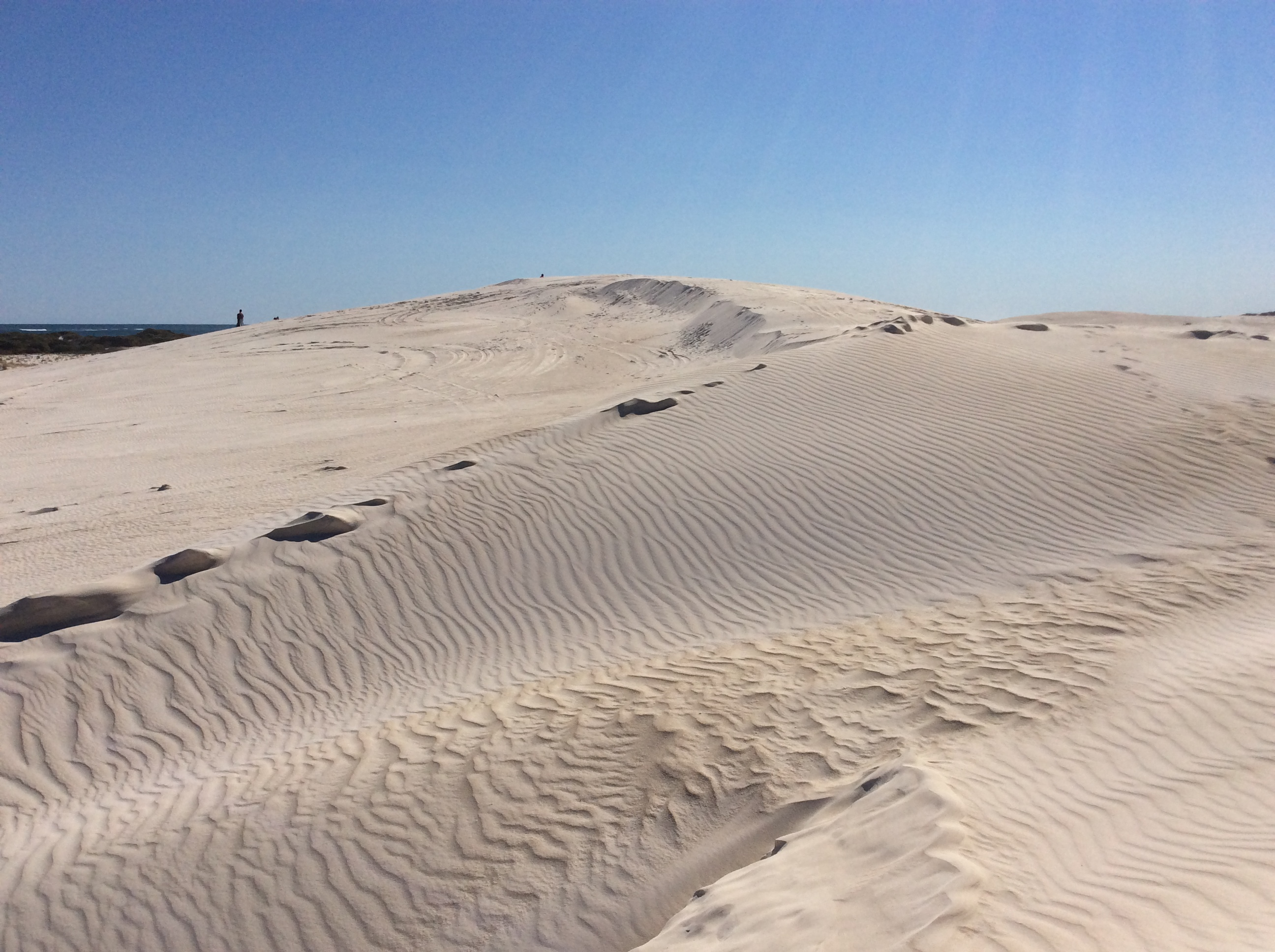
Lancelin sand dunes
