= Moore River =

River in Western Australia

Coordinates: 31°22′S 115°29′E

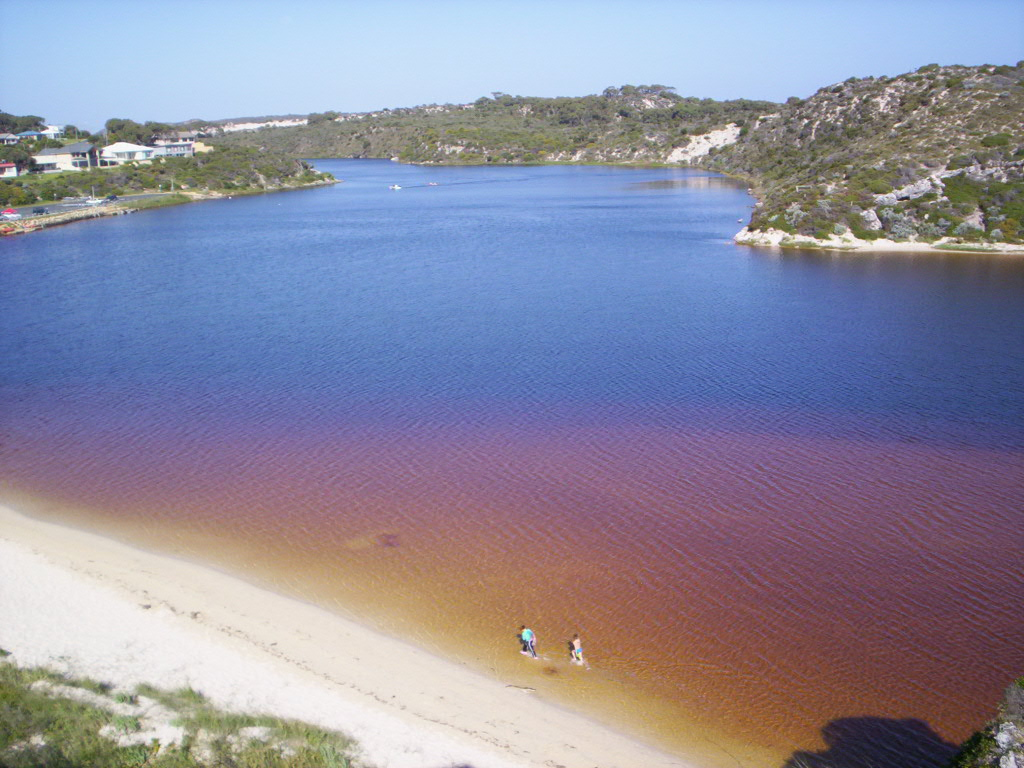
- Moore River estuary at Guilderton

Location
- Country: Australia

Physical characteristics
- Source
  - location: Dalwallinu
  - elevation: 310 m (1,017 ft)
- Mouth
  - location: Indian Ocean at Guilderton
  - elevation: sea level
- Length: 193 km (120 mi)
- Basin size: 13,550 km^{2} (5,232 sq mi)
- Discharge
  - average: 60,860 ML/a (1.929 m^{3}/s; 68.11 cu ft/s)

Basin features
- Tributaries
  - left: Yadgena Brook, Moore River East
  - right: Coonderoo River

Moore River (Garban) is a river in the Wheatbelt region of Western Australia.

== Geography ==
The headwaters of the Moore River lie in the Perenjori, Carnamah and Dalwallinu Shires. The river then drains southwards through Moora, flows westerly before joining with the Moore River East near Mogumber, then flows in a westerly direction over the Edengerie Cascade, through the northern edge of the Moore River Nature Reserve, then through the Gingin Scarp, discharging into the Indian Ocean at Guilderton.

The river includes a catchment that extends from just south of Three Springs to Guilderton. The catchment has a total area of 13,800 square kilometres (5,328 sq mi) and is 80% cleared for agriculture. The catchment area is used for broadacre farming but with increasing diversification in horticulture and tree plantations. The river mouth at Guilderton typically closes during the summer months due to insufficient water flow, creating a sandbar.

The river has nine sub-catchment areas and has a number of tributaries and lakes along the length of the river. The salinity levels in the river catchment vary from brackish to saline with the exception of Gingin Brook which remains fresh throughout the year.

== History ==
The Aboriginal people referred to the lower part of the river as Garban. White settlers named it River Moore in May 1836 by Corporal Patrick Heffron of the 63rd Regiment of Foot, after his expedition leader George Fletcher Moore, Advocate-General. The exploratory party comprised Moore, Heffron and an Aboriginal man named Weenat. Heffron was notable for his participation in the Pinjarra Massacre in 1834.

The river is prone to periodic flooding unusually following cyclones and tropical depressions crossing the coast further north. In 1907, the railway lines between Watheroo and Moora were closed for some time when parts of the track were washed away. More floods occurred in 1917 when 1.7 inches (43 mm) of rain fell in three hours at Mogumber with similar falls in surrounding areas. Moora was once again left underwater and rail services in surrounding areas were suspended. Low-lying areas in other towns such as Arrino, Three Springs, and Coorow were also submerged.

In 1932, the river flooded once again following heavy rains in the Midland districts. Railway lines were undermined to a depth of 30 feet (9 m) leaving Moora isolated from Perth by both road and rail. The township of Moora was left 3 feet (1 m) underwater and portions of the town had to be evacuated. Crops and some stock were lost as a result of the floodwaters.

Opened in 1918, near the head of the river, was the now defunct and discredited government-managed-settlement and internment camp known as the Moore River Native Settlement.

== See also ==
- Moore River National Park
- Moore River Native Settlement
