= Coastal regions of Western Australia =

Regions of Western Australia

Commonly used Bureau of Meteorology coastal landmarks

Western Australia has the longest coastline of any state or territory in Australia, at 10,194 km or 12,889 km (20,781 km including islands). (Note: The length of a coastline may vary significantly depending on how it is measured.) It is a significant portion of the coastline of Australia, which is 35,877 km (59,736 km including islands).

The earliest full charting of the coastline occurred during exploration in the late eighteenth and early nineteenth centuries.

The coastline has some features or organisms that are found on the entire length, while some others are specific to particular coastal regions.

Various government map posters have been created over time, which have examples of coastal form, or types of coast such as the 1984 map with photos.

== Integrated Marine and Coastal Regionalisation of Australia (IMCRA) ==
The IMCRA has offshore regions delineated in a systematic appraisal of ecology and geography.

== Coastal regions used in weather reports ==
Standard Bureau of Meteorology reports include the following reference points for coastal weather reports:

- North Kimberley Coast: WA/NT border (or to Kuri Bay}
- West Kimberley Coast: Kuri Bay to Wallal (Kimberley land region)
- Pilbara Coast East: Wallal Downs to Cape Preston (Pilbara land region)
- Pilbara Coast West: Cape Preston to North West Cape (Pilbara land region)
- Ningaloo Coast: Northwest Cape to Carnarvon (Gascoyne land region)
- Gascoyne Coast: north of Carnarvon to Kalbarri (Gascoyne land region)
- Geraldton Coast: north of Kalbarri to Jurien Bay (Central west land region)
- Lancelin Coast: Jurien Bay to Two Rocks (Lower west land region)
- Perth Local Waters: Two Rocks to Dawesville (Lower west land region and/or Perth Metropolitan region)
- Perth Coast:west of Rottnest and Perth Local Waters (same limits of Two Rocks and Dawesville)
- Bunbury Geographe Coast: Dawesville to Busselton, (part lower west and part south west land region)
- Leeuwin Coast: Busselton to west of Denmark (South west land region)
- Albany Coast: west of Denmark to Bremer Bay (south coast coastal land region)
- Esperance Coast: Bremer Bay to Israelite Bay (Southeast coastal land region)
- Eucla Coast: Israelite Bay to SA Border (Eucla land region)

== General coastal regions ==
There are groupings for wider regions that are based very close to the land regions; one made in the 1980s has 8 coastal regions, while the 2003 Coastal Planning and Management Manual has five regions with component sections:

- Kimberley Coast: Northern Territory / Western Australia border to Broome (2003 manual, figure 2-2 Pilbara Kimberley Region)
- Canning: Broome to Port Hedland (Cape Keraudren – east of the De Grey River delta in the 2003 manual)
- Pilbara Coast: Port Hedland to Onslow
- Coral Coast or Gascoyne region – Onslow to Kalbarri (Shark Bay in the 2003 manual)
- Kalbarri to Cape Naturaliste: which includes, Batavia Coast, the Central West also known as the Turquoise Coast and another further south known at the Sunset Coast
- South West Capes, or simply Capes Region: Cape Naturaliste to Cape Leeuwin (to Albany in the 2003 manual)
- South Coast: Cape Leeuwin to Israelite Bay – incorporates the coastal region between Cape Leeuwin and Windy Harbour, usually considered part of the south west
- South Coast Region or the South East: Israelite Bay (Albany in the 2003 manual) to the Western Australia / South Australian border (Eucla)

== Fisheries bioregions ==
Under the Fish Resources Management Act 1994 there are four main regions on the Western Australian coast.

- North Coast (Pilbara/Kimberley): from the Western Australian and Northern Territory border to 114° 50' E 21° 46' S, just west of the mouth of the Ashburton River
- Gascoyne Coast: (Note: Not to be confused with the tourist coast region which might have slightly different start and finish points from the fisheries designated coast) from 114° 50' E 21° 46' S, just west of the mouth of the Ashburton River Mouth to 27° S – about halfway between Kalbarri and Denham
- West Coast: from 27° S: about halfway between Kalbarri and Denham south to 115 ° 30' E – Black Point east of Cape Leeuwin
- South Coast: from 115 ° 30' E: Black Point east of Cape Leeuwin, to the South Australian Border

== Features ==
The coastal regions include a range of beaches, cliffs, and coastline features that are dependent upon the underlying geology; the geological provinces have direct relationship to the coastal forms:

- Eucla Basin – Eucla – Israelite Bay – Limestone
- Yilgarn craton – Point Malcolm – Cape Arid and Point Hood to Point D'Entrecasteaux
- Bremer Basin – Israelite Bay – Point D'Entrecasteaux
- Perth Basin – Augusta – Murchison River
- Carnarvon Basin – Murchison River – Cape Preston
- Pilbara craton – Cape Preston – Port Hedland
- Canning Basin – Port Hedland – King Sound
- Kimberley Basin – Kimberley Coast
- Bonaparte Basin – Cambridge Gulf

== Gulfs ==
- Admiralty Gulf
- Cambridge Gulf
- Exmouth Gulf
- Joseph Bonaparte Gulf

== Sounds ==
Specifically referring to Sound (geography)

- Camden Sound
- Cockburn Sound
- King Sound
- Yampi Sound
- York Sound
- King George Sound

== Archipelagoes and island groups ==
- Archipelago of the Recherche
- Bonaparte Archipelago
- Buccaneer Archipelago
- Houtman Abrolhos
- Monte Bello Islands
- Thevenard Island
- Direction Island (Exmouth Gulf)

== Aquatic flora ==
The Western Australian coastline has the greatest diversity of seagrasses in the world, and the meadows they form are among the largest on earth.

- Amphibolis antarctica, Wireweed, Sea Nymph
- Amphibolis griffithii
- Halophila australis
- Halophila decipiens
- Halophila ovalis, Paddle Weed, Sea Wrack
- Heterozostera tasmanica
- Posidonia angustifolia
- Posidonia australis, Fireball Weed
- Posidonia coriacea
- Posidonia denhartogii
- Posidonia robertsoniae
- Posidonia sinuosa
- Syringodium isoetifolium
- Thalassodendron pachyrhizum

== See also ==
Australian context

- Geology of Australia

Local features

- List of islands of Western Australia, 0–9, A–C and subsequent sections
- List of watercourses in Western Australia

Regional divisions

- Interim Biogeographic Regionalisation for Australia
- Ecoregions in Australia
- Regions of Western Australia

Plants and natural history

- Seagrasses of Western Australia
