= Favorite Island =

Island of Western Australia

Escape Island
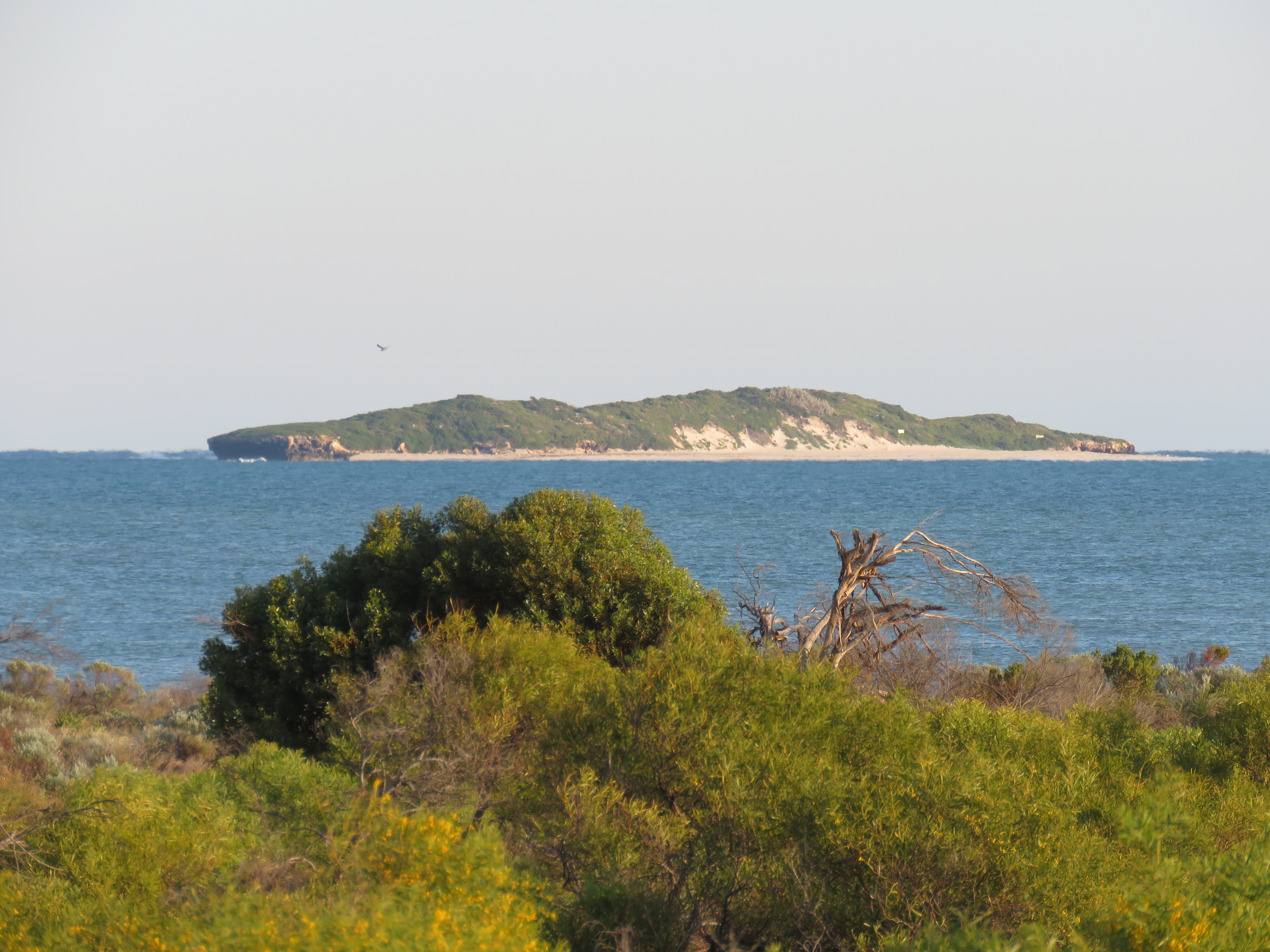
- Favorite Island seen from Jurien Bay

Geography
- Location: Indian Ocean
- Coordinates: 30°17′03″S 115°00′21″E

Administration
- Australia
- State: Western Australia
- LGA: Shire of Dandaragan

Favorite Island (also found as Favourite Island) is an island near Jurien Bay in Western Australia.

It is located within the Jurien Bay Marine Park and part of the Boullanger, Whitlock, Favourite, Tern and Osprey Islands Nature Reserve. The island has an area of 2.42 hectares (6 acres), is located 3.3 kilometres (2 mi) from the mainland and has a maximum elevation of 14 metres (46 ft).

The island is part of the Turquoise Coast islands nature reserve group, a chain of 40 islands spread over a distance of 150 kilometres (93 mi).

A population of 133 Lancelin Island skinks were introduced onto the island in 2002 by the Department of Environment and Conservation as part of a breeding program.

== See also ==
- List of islands of Western Australia
