= Whitlock Island =

Island of Western Australia

Geography
- Location: Indian Ocean
- Coordinates: 30°19′12″S 114°59′32″E

Administration
- Australia
- State: Western Australia
- LGA: Shire of Dandaragan

Whitlock Island is an island near Jurien Bay in Western Australia. It is located within the Jurien Bay Marine Park and part of the Boullanger, Whitlock, Favourite, Tern and Osprey Islands Nature Reserve.

The island has an area of 5.24 hectares (13 acres), is located 2.4 kilometres (1.5 mi) from the mainland, at the southern end of Jurien Bay, and has a maximum elevation of 10 metres (33 ft).

The island is part of the Turquoise Coast islands nature reserve group, a chain of 40 islands spread over a distance of 150 kilometres (93 mi).

A population of Jurien Bay skinks, a threatened species, is known to inhabit the island. Dibblers were discovered on Boullager and Whitlock Islands in 1985; they represent the only original island populations of the species left.

== See also ==
- List of islands of Western Australia
