= Cervantes Islands =

Group of islands in Western Australia

- Location of Cervantes Islands in Western Australia
- Interactive map of Cervantes Islands
- Etymology: American whaling ship named after writer Miguel de Cervantes that was wrecked off north island in June 1844

Geography
- Location: Indian Ocean
- Coordinates: 30°31′35″S 115°02′45″E
- Total islands: 3
- Area: 285.16 ha (704.6 acres)

Administration
- Australia
- State: Western Australia
- Local Government Area: Shire of Dandaragan

Additional information
- Time zone: Australian Western Standard Time (UTC+08:00)

The Cervantes Islands are a small group of islands to the south-west of the locality of Cervantes, both within the Shire of Dandaragan in Western Australia. They are 2 kilometres (1.2 mi) from Thirsty Point at the southern side of the locality, approximately 180 kilometres (110 mi) north-west of Perth. (Note: Thirsty Point was earlier known as Wreck Point.)

== Island group ==
The Cervantes Islands are a group of three individual islands:

- North Cervantes Island with an area of 284 hectares (701.8 acres) located 1.6 kilometres (1.0 mi) from the mainland with a maximum elevation of 8 metres (26 ft)
- Middle Cervantes Island with an area of 0.45 hectares (1.1 acres) located 2.6 kilometres (1.6 mi) from the mainland
- South Cervantes Island with an area of 0.71 hectares (1.8 acres) located 2.7 kilometres (1.7 mi) from the mainland

The group sits within the Jurien Bay Marine Park and the Turquoise Coast islands group, a chain of 40 islands spread over a distance of 150 kilometres (93 mi). Cervantes Islands are located in the Cervantes Islands Nature Reserve, which was declared in 1968. Australian sea lion are known to inhabit the islands.

Cervantes Islands are named for an American whaling ship that was wrecked off the North island in June 1844, which was named after the writer Miguel de Cervantes.

== See also ==
- List of islands of Western Australia
