= Seagrasses of Western Australia =

The Seagrasses of Western Australia are submerged flowering plants found along the coast, around islands, and in Estuaries of Western Australia. The region contains some of the largest seagrass meadows in the world, and is the most diverse in the number of species. The variety of habitats along its western and southern coasts is often soft sands in shallow subtropical waters, ideal for these plants.

== Description ==
Marine grasses are flowering plants that evolved from terrestrial grasses to habitat in coastal waters. In contrast to seaweeds, usually found on rocks, seagrass colonises sandy ocean beds to form dense stands and meadows.

The Western Australian coastline, along with its islands, is over 20,000 km long. These tropical to temperate waters extend from latitudes 32-34°S to 12°S. The great diversity of habitat in these coastal regions of Western Australia are occupied by seagrasses, frequently 'engineering' habitat through colonisation of shallow ocean floors. These plants possess rhizomes which extend under the sand, stems emerge from these with one, or many, flattened and elongated leaves. These features allow the plants to stabilise the substrate, anchor themselves against currents, and change the environment.

A colony may have one or several species of seagrass, and a large number of other species living within it. The area covered by seagrass in Western Australian waters is equivalent to Australia's rainforest.

== Distribution ==
The range extends to the temperate regions of the Southern Ocean. Some areas of the southern coast provide suitable habitat, such as those at King George Sound and the Archipelago of the Recherche, the warmer water of the Leeuwin Current contributes the diversity of these seagrass communities. The western coast contain notable and diverse seagrass beds; Cockburn Sound and the Swan River estuary, and the Houtman Abrolhos, Rottnest Island and other islands. The Wooramel Seagrass Bank 12 species - estimated 4,500 km^{2} of seabed - at Shark Bay is the largest reported seagrass meadows in the world (Walker, 1989). The Timor Sea is largely unsurveyed.

== Ecosystem ==
Seagrasses are the foundation of complex ecosystems, primarily from the ability to colonise inshore coastal sand with its roots and matted rhizomes. These meadows are able to provide habitat to other species, especially epiphytic relationships, and are a food source for other organisms. Western rock lobsters are found as juveniles amongst seagrass, receiving food and shelter until they reach maturity. The leaves are also eaten by dugong and other creatures.

== Diversity ==
The seagrasses of Western Australia are the most diverse of any region in the world, 26 species in 11 genera are currently described.

The four families of Alismatales includes three genera within Hydrocharitaceae, a largely aquatic family of tape grasses, and seven other genera of marine species.

- Hydrocharitaceae
  - Enhalus acoroides (L.f.) Royle
  - Halophila australis Doty & B.C.Stone
  - Halophila decipiens Ostenf.
  - Halophila minor (Zoll.) Hartog
  - Halophila ovalis (R.Br.) Hook.f.
  - Halophila spinulosa (R.Br.) Asch.
  - Thalassia hemprichii (Ehrenb.) Asch.
- Cymodoceaceae
  - Amphibolis antarctica (Labill.) Sonder et Aschers. ex Aschers. (Wire weed, Sea Nymph)
  - Amphibolis griffithii (J.Black) den Hartog
  - Cymodocea angustata Ostenfeld
  - Cymodocea serrulata (R.Br.) Asch. et Magnus
  - Halodule pinifolia (Miki) den Hartog
  - Halodule uninervis (Forsk.) Aschers.
  - Syringodium isoetifolium (Aschers.) Dandy
  - Thalassodendron ciliatum (Forrsk.) den Hartog
  - Thalassodendron pachyrhizum den Hartog
- Posidoniaceae
  - Posidonia angustifolia Cambridge and J.Kuo
  - Posidonia australis Hook.f. (Ribbon weed)
  - Posidonia coriacea Cambridge and J.Kuo
  - Posidonia denhartogii J.Kuo and Cambridge
  - Posidonia kirkmanii J.Kuo and Cambridge
  - Posidonia ostenfeldii den Hartog
  - Posidonia robertsoniae J.Kuo and Cambridge
  - Posidonia sinuosa Cambridge and J.Kuo
- Zosteraceae
  - Heterozostera nigricaulis J.Kuo
  - Heterozostera polychlamys J.Kuo
  - Zostera muelleri Asch.
  - Zostera muelleri subsp. mucronata (Hartog) S.W.L.Jacobs

== See also ==
- Coastal regions of Western Australia
