= Coral Coast, Western Australia =

Coastal region in Western Australia

Coordinates: 27.7°S 114.2°E

Coral Coast is a tourism promotion name for the coastal region along Western Australia's mid western coastline between Cervantes and Exmouth.

It is named because of its unusual coral formations so far south, however the specific coastal area has been given other names as well over time.

At earlier stages, sections of the coastal region have had separate "brands", the coast near Geraldton being known as the Batavia Coast, and south of Geraldton known as the Turquoise Coast, however these brands are not part of current tourism promotion schemes.

The Sunset Coast brand of the northern beach areas of metropolitan Perth is still current.

== See also ==
- Coastal regions of Western Australia
