= Cripps Pink =

Apple cultivar

Cripps Pink (Pink Lady)
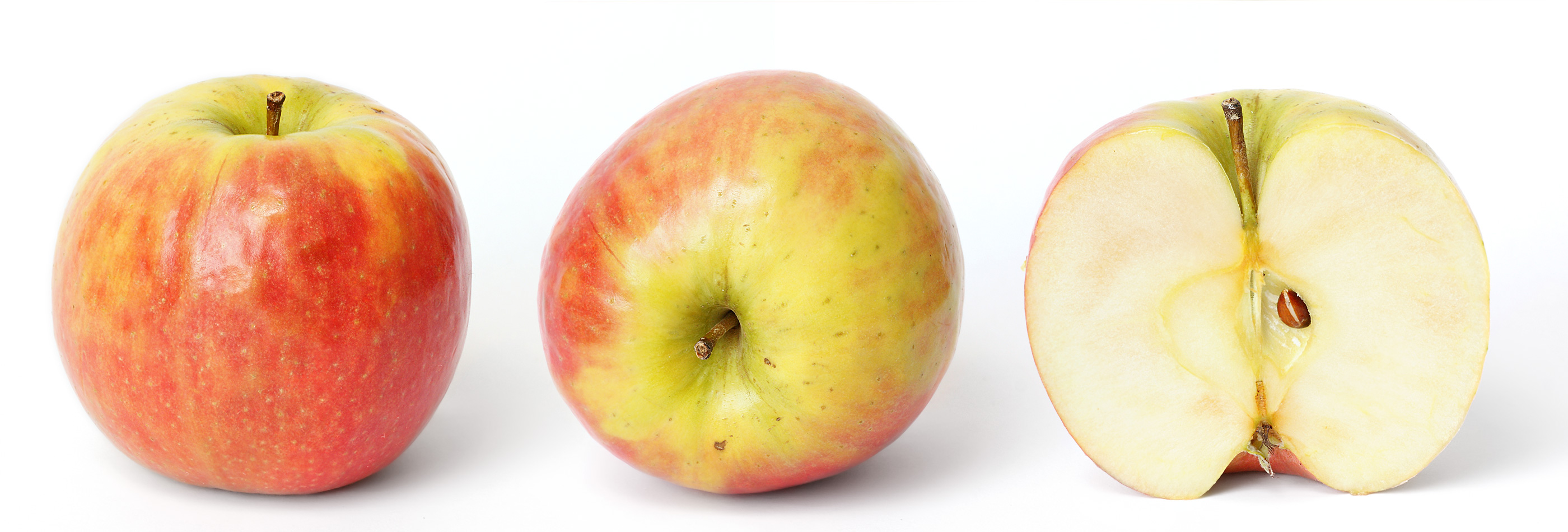
- Hybrid parentage: Lady Williams × Golden Delicious
- Cultivar: Cripps Pink
- Origin: Western Australia, 1973

Cripps Pink is a cultivar of apple. It is one of several cultivars sold under the trademark name Pink Lady. It was originally bred by John Cripps at the Western Australia Department of Agriculture (Stoneville Research Station), by crossing the Australian apple Lady Williams with the American Golden Delicious; the result is a combination of the firm, long-storing property of Lady Williams with the sweetness and lack of storage scald of Golden Delicious.

== Registered trademark ==
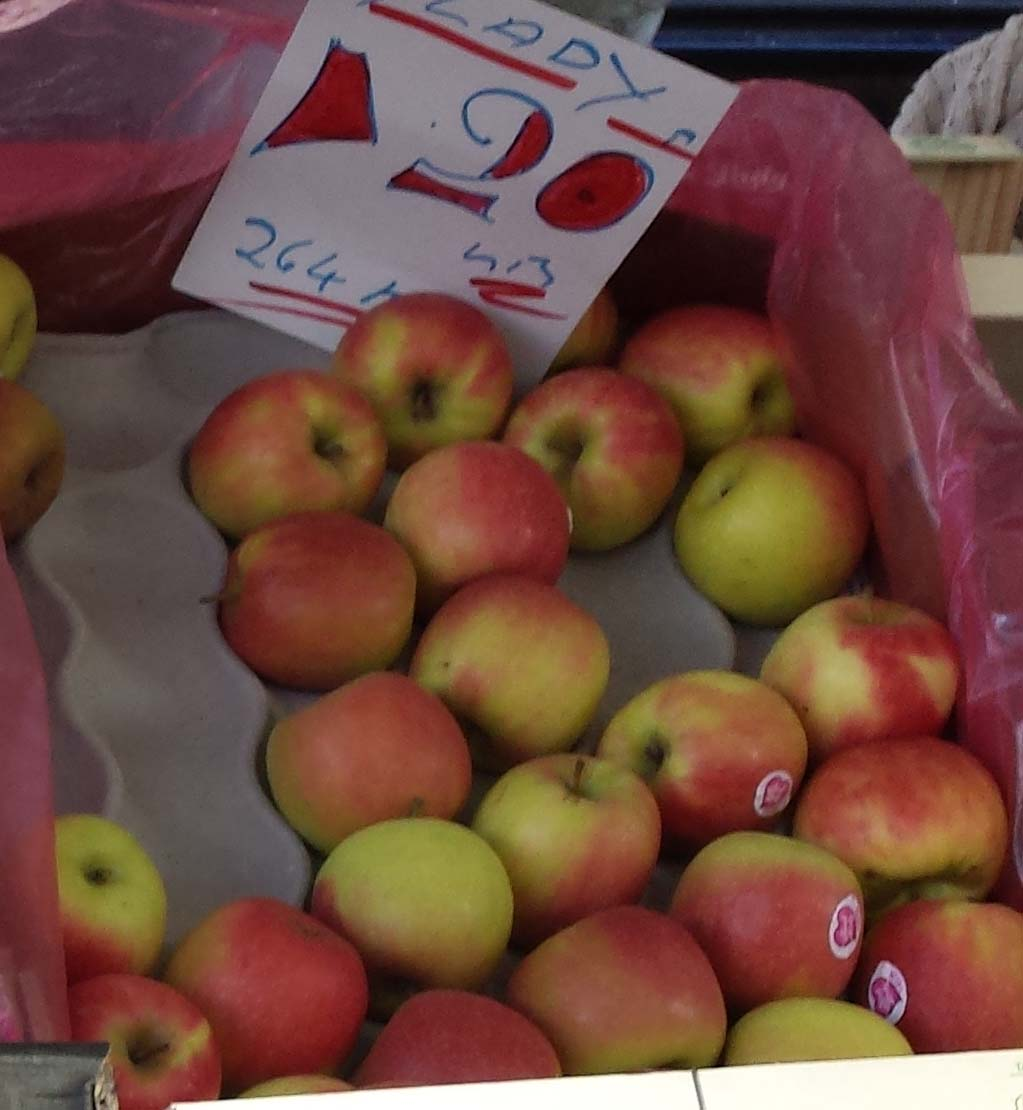
Pink Lady apples for sale on a UK market stall

Cripps Pink is owned and licensed by the Department of Primary Industries and Regional Development (DPIRD), which has plant breeders' rights in multiple countries. The peak industry body for Australian apple and pear growers – Apple and Pear Australia Limited (APAL) – owns and manages within their territory the intellectual property in the Pink Lady family of trade marks, which is registered in more than 80 territories. Pink Lady America manages the Pink Lady family of trademarks in the United States and Mexico for Brandt's Fruit Trees of Washington State who own the series of trademarks in these countries.

Registration of the Pink Lady trademark in Australia has been a challenging process. This is primarily due to the apple being widely known by the industry and public by the trade mark name, Pink Lady, rather than the cultivar name, Cripps Pink.

== Growth and development ==
The apple shape is ellipsoid, it has a distinctive blush mixed with a green "background", and taste is tart. Cripps Pink requires a long, 200-day growth period and a hot climate, making them difficult to grow in more temperate latitudes or climates subjected to early winter freezes.

They are principally grown in Australia, but are also grown in New Zealand, Chile, Canada, Argentina, South Africa, Uruguay, Brazil, Japan, Italy, Spain, France, Serbia and Israel, and in the United States since the late 1990s.

In the United Kingdom, the Pink Lady brand has increased in popularity. In 2012, for the first time in the 20 years since the first shipment of apples from Australia, the Pink Lady brand replaced Granny Smith apples in the number three spot by value in the United Kingdom.

== Cultivation ==
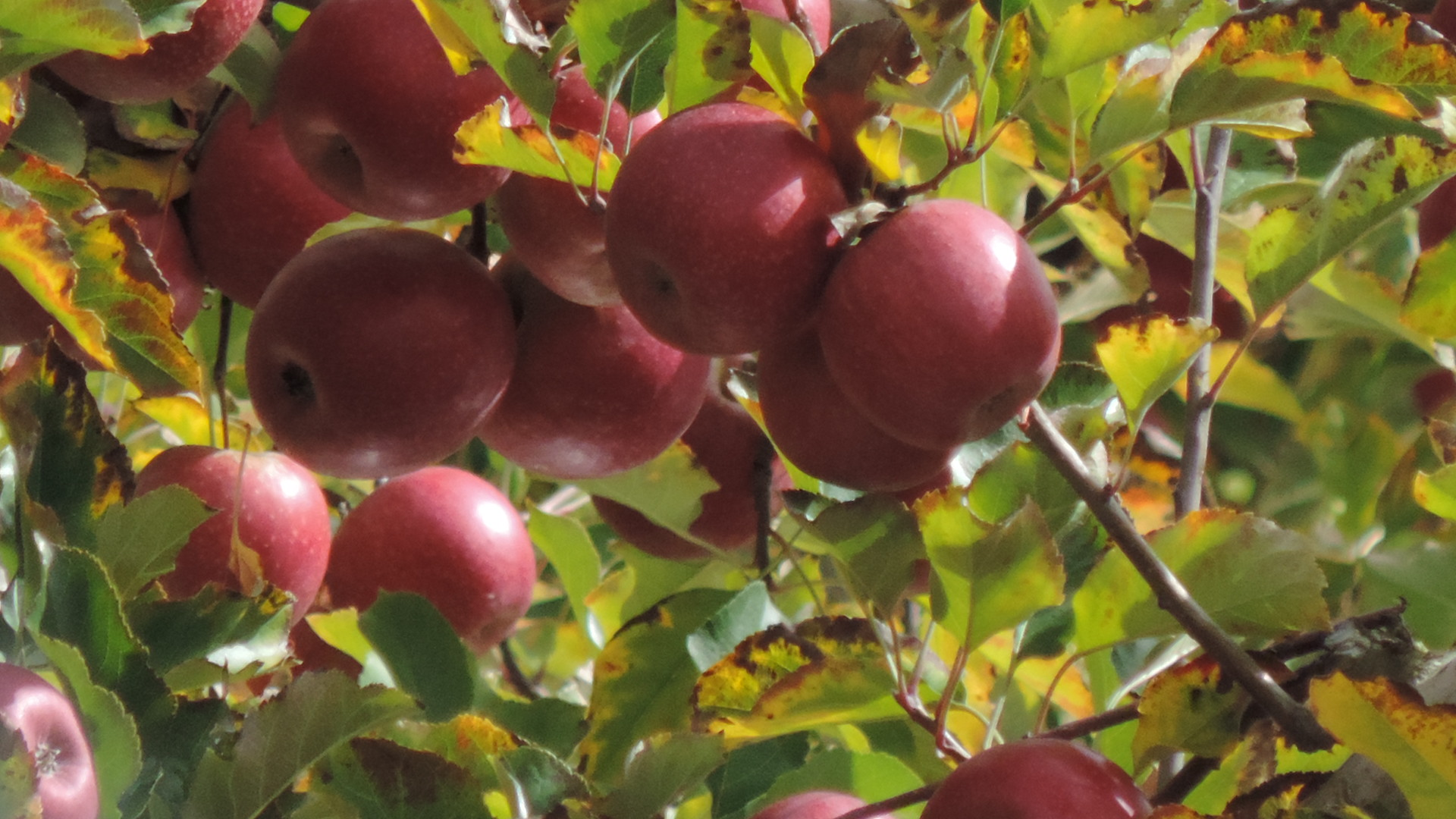
Pink Lady apples growing in the Granite Belt, Queensland, Australia

Pink Lady brand apples must meet certain trade mark quality specifications. Criteria for the specifications include sugar content, firmness, blemishes and colour. Inspections are regularly performed to ensure both the quality and traceability of the apple from the orchard to the shop.

Cripps Pink apples are the earliest to blossom (late March/early April in the Northern Hemisphere and late September/early October in the Southern Hemisphere), and some of the last to be harvested (end of October/early November in the Northern Hemisphere and late April/early May for the Southern Hemisphere). It is the significant change in temperature between night and day in the autumn that gives the apples their colouring. However, they must also be well exposed. Therefore, the trees must be carefully pruned and their fruit production well managed.

== Mutations ==
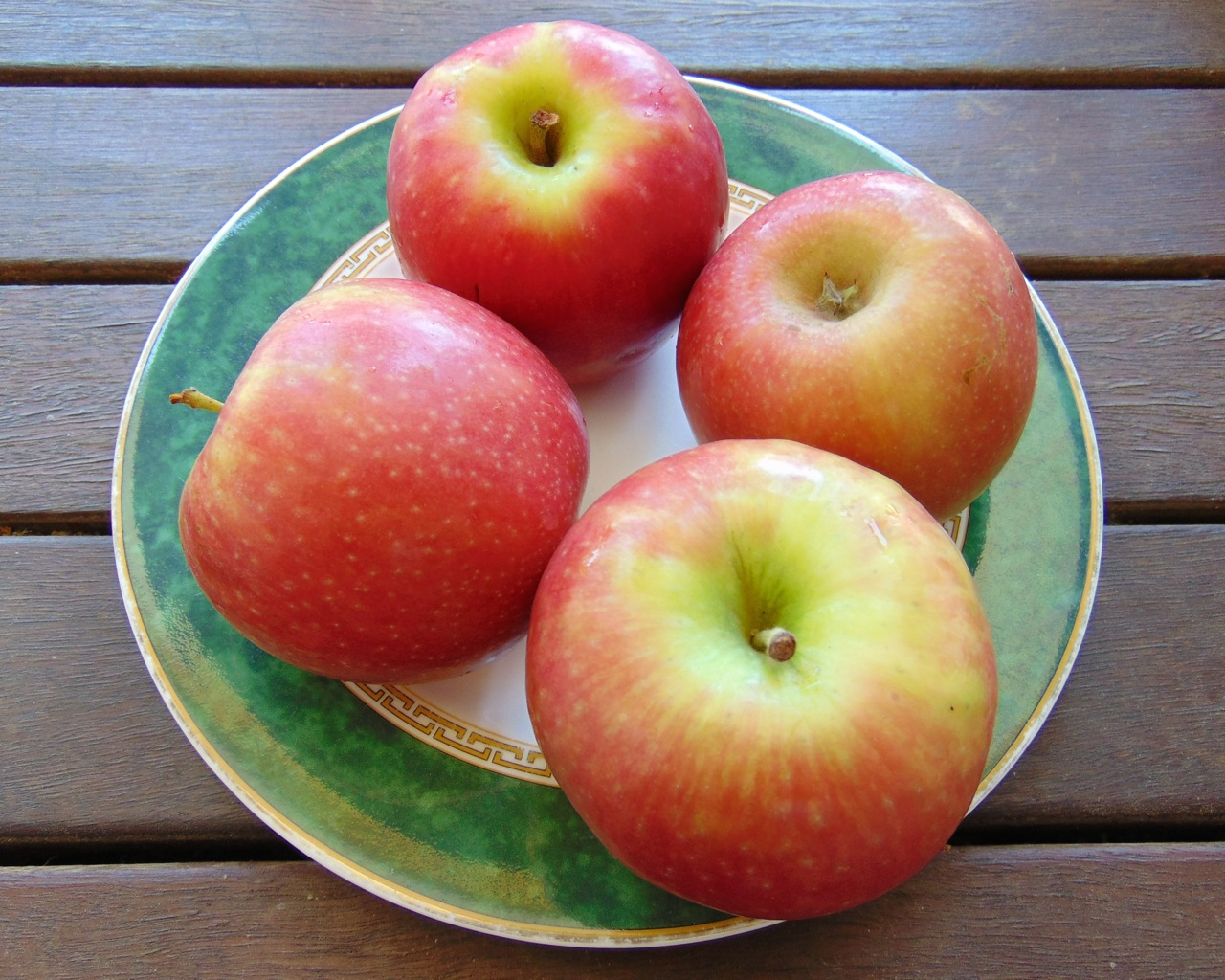
Rosy Glow apples

Several natural occurring mutations, called sports, of the Cripps Pink cultivar have been discovered and adopted into cultivation. A number have either achieved registration, or are seeking registration of plant breeders' rights or Plant Patents in multiple countries.

- The high-coloured variety Rosy Glow is a spontaneous single-limb mutation of Cripps Pink discovered in Forest Range, South Australia, in 1995. At the time of selection the fruit on the limb was 100% coloured, while the surrounding fruit was less than 10% coloured.
- The Lady in Red cultivar is a chance limb mutation of Cripps Pink discovered in Hawkes Bay, New Zealand, in 1996. Lady in Red colours earlier and exhibits more intense colouring over a greater percentage of the fruit surface than Cripps Pink.
- PLMAS98 (known as Maslin) is a limb sport mutation of Cripps Pink and was discovered in 1999 in Manjimup, Western Australia. It is considered distinct from Cripps Pink due to its early maturity – fruit is mature and ready for harvest at least 15 days earlier than fruit of Cripps Pink.
- Ruby Pink was discovered in May 1999 in Main Ridge, Victoria, Australia as a limb sport growing among a uniform block of Cripps Pink. The variety is distinguished by the following unique combination of characteristics: the fruit is uniformly ellipsoid, as compared to the symmetrical ellipsoid shape of Cripps Pink; the fruit has a higher percentage of red colour than Cripps Pink; the fruit matures later than Cripps Pink; and the fruit has a higher firmness rating than Cripps Pink.
- PLBAR B1 (known as Barnsby) was discovered during the 1999–2000 growing season in Pemberton, Western Australia. It originated as a limb sport mutation of Cripps Pink and is noted for its exceptional colour and early maturity as compared to Cripps Pink. Fruit of the new variety is mature and ready for harvest about 14 to 18 days earlier than fruit of Cripps Pink.
- PLFOG99 (known as Pink Belle) was discovered in late 1999 or early 2000 in Kirup, Western Australia, and is a chance limb mutation of Cripps Pink. The limb was observed to produce fruit up to two weeks earlier, and the tree exhibits a more compact growth habit than Cripps Pink.
- Lady Laura is a spontaneous limb sport mutation of Cripps Pink discovered in Borenore, New South Wales, Australia. It is distinguished from other apple varieties by the amount and intensity of over colour of the fruit, and the earlier coloration of fruit in comparison to Cripps Pink.

Rosy Glow and Lady in Red have been accepted by APAL and Pink Lady America into the Pink Lady business model, allowing fruit of the improved variety, which meets the Pink Lady quality criteria, to be sold as Pink Lady brand apples. In general, the improved selections produce apples with a larger area of blush and/or earlier maturity. Pink Lady America has also accepted the early clones listed as PLMAS98 (Maslin) and PLBAR B1 (Barnsby) as well as Ruby Pink and PLFOG99 into their business model for the Pink Lady brand.

== See also ==
- Cripps Red apples, which have the same parentage as Cripps Pink, are marketed as "Sundowner".
- Sunflare apples, a cross between the Honeycrisp and Cripps Pink.

== Gallery ==
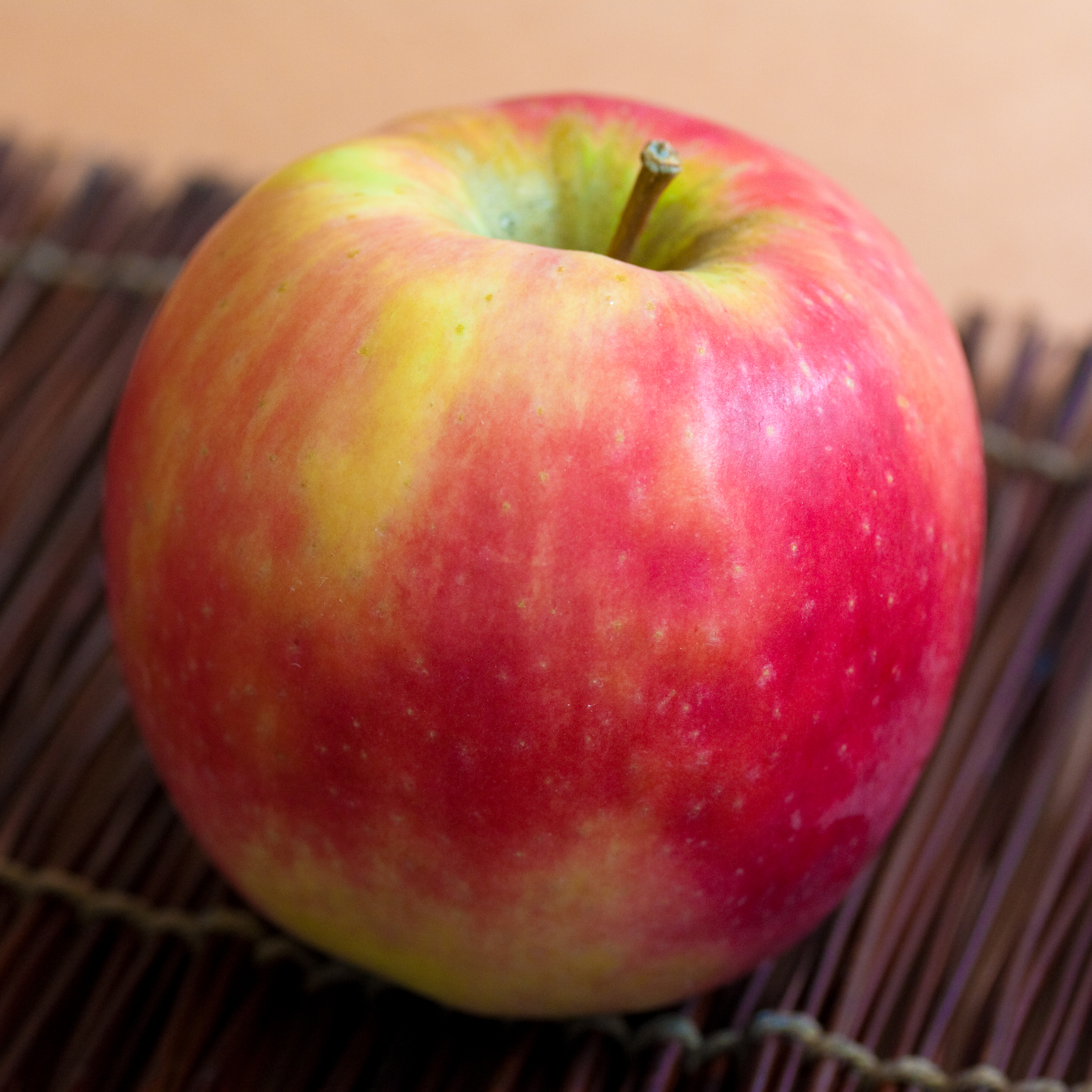
Closeup of a Pink Lady apple

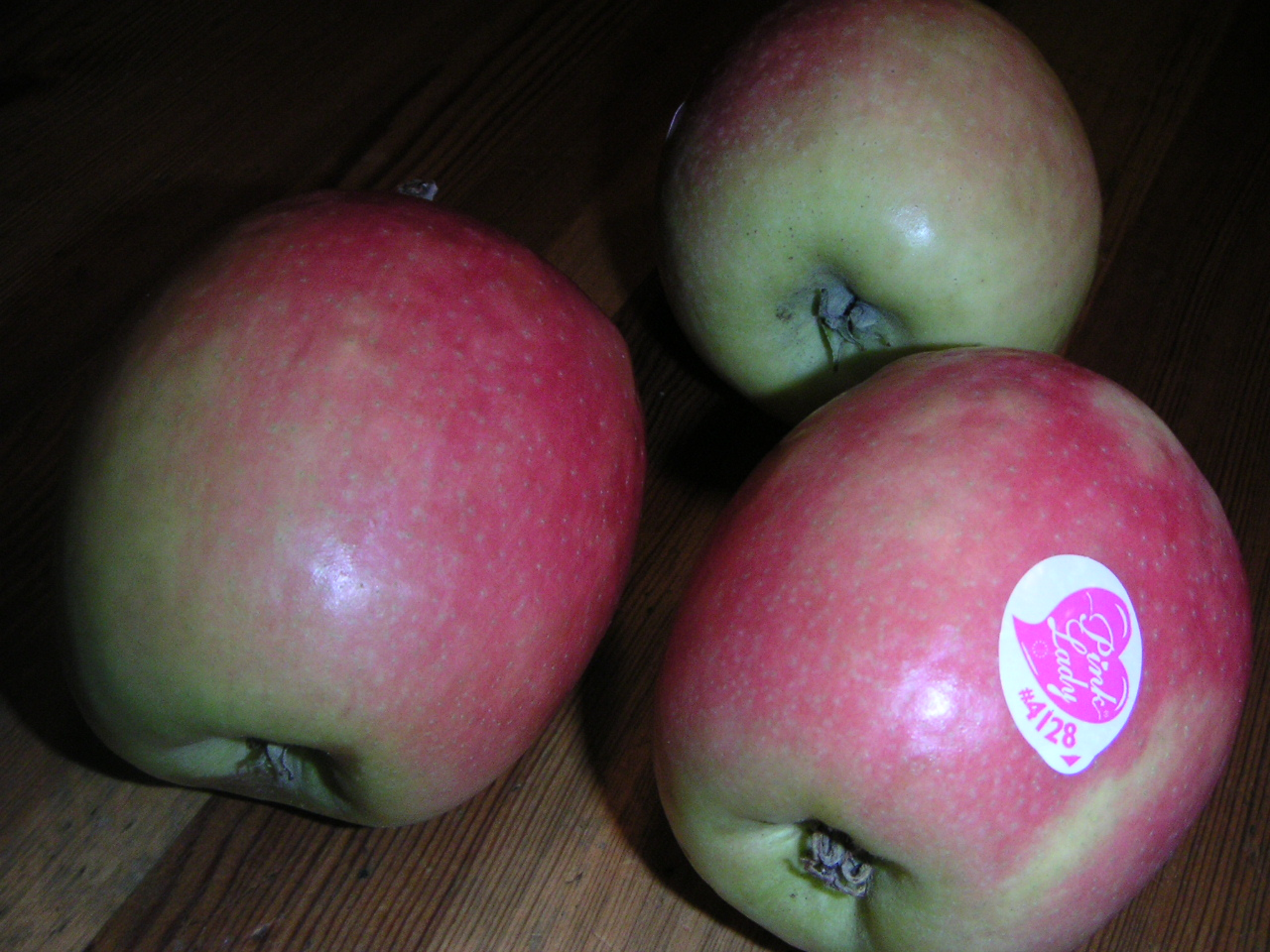
Pink Lady with tag #4128

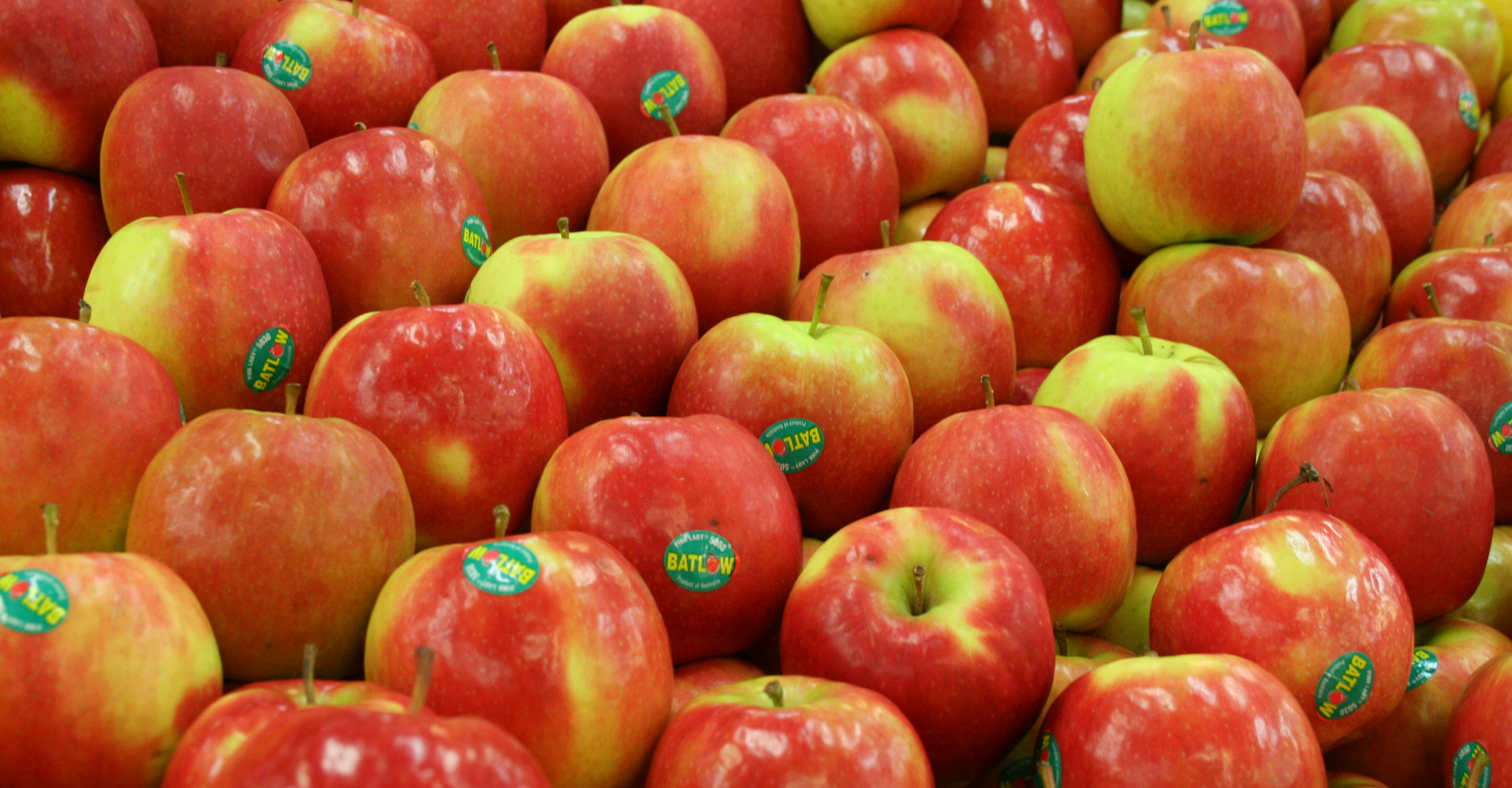
Stacked Pink Lady apples on sale in Australia
