= John Cripps (horticulturalist) =

British-Australian horticulturalist (1927–2022)

John Cripps AO
- Born: John Ernest Lane Cripps; 9 April 1927; Steyning, Sussex, England
- Died: 10 May 2022 (aged 95); Western Australia
- Education: University of Reading
- Employer: Western Australia Department of Agriculture
- Known for: Breeding the Pink Lady ('Cripps Pink') and Sundowner ('Cripps Red') apples

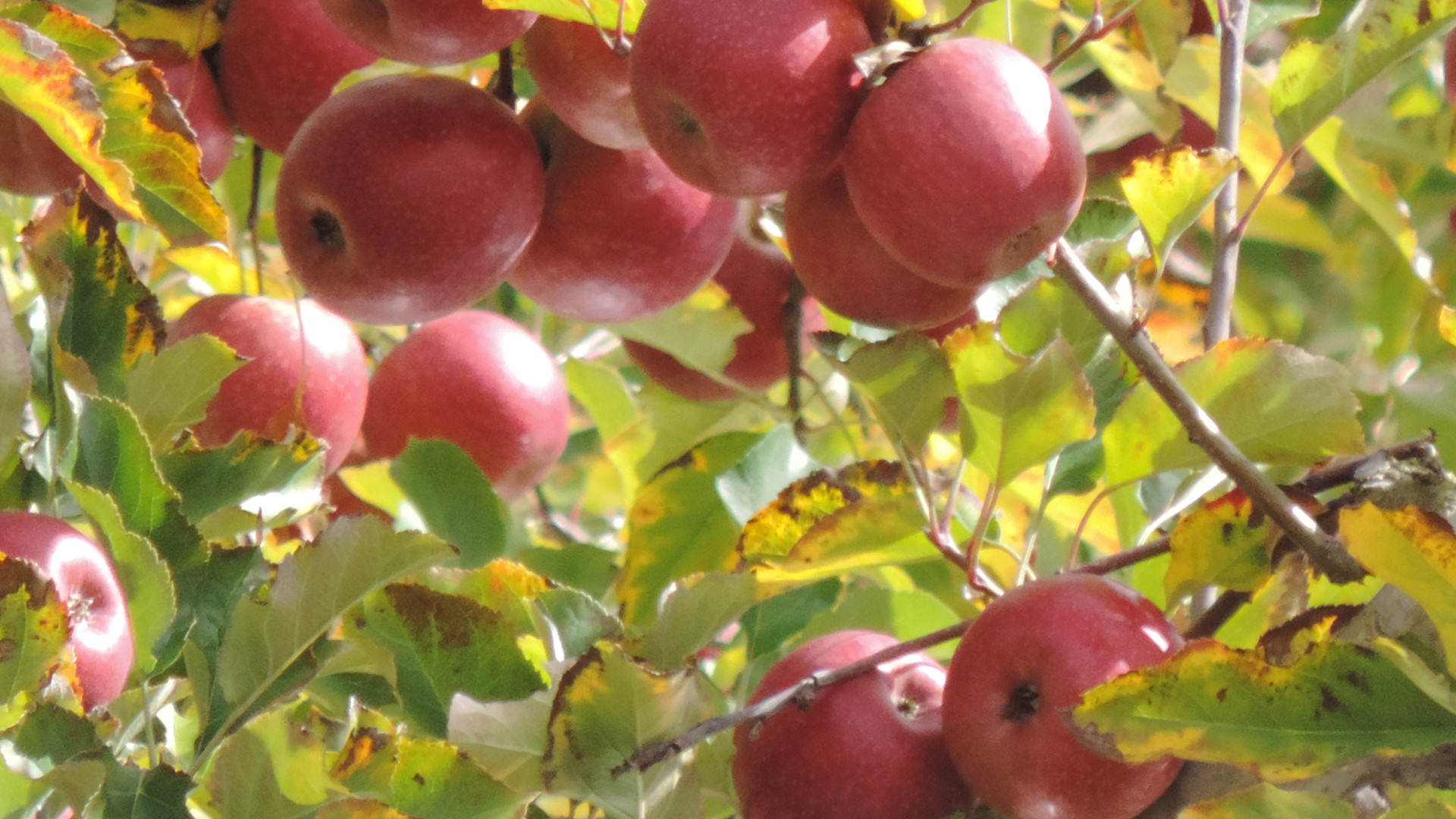
Pink Lady Apples

John Ernest Lane Cripps AO (9 April 1927 – 10 May 2022) was a British-Australian horticulturalist. He was best known for breeding the Pink Lady ('Cripps Pink') and Sundowner ('Cripps Red') apples.

Cripps was born in Steyning, Sussex, England, and completed a degree in horticulture at the University of Reading. In 1955, he emigrated to Perth, Western Australia following a job offer from the Western Australia Department of Agriculture. He became a specialist horticulturalist with the department in 1959, and worked on developing rootstocks and strategies to optimise horticultural production in Western Australia.

In 2010, he was inducted into the Hall of Fame of the Royal Agricultural Society of Western Australia for significant influence on the apple industry of Australia. In 2015, he was made an Officer of the Order of Australia (AO) for distinguished service to primary industry through internationally renowned, innovative contributions to the agriculture and food sectors, and to the community.
