= Wedge Island (Western Australia) =

Locality in Western Australia

Native name: Wedj Boya
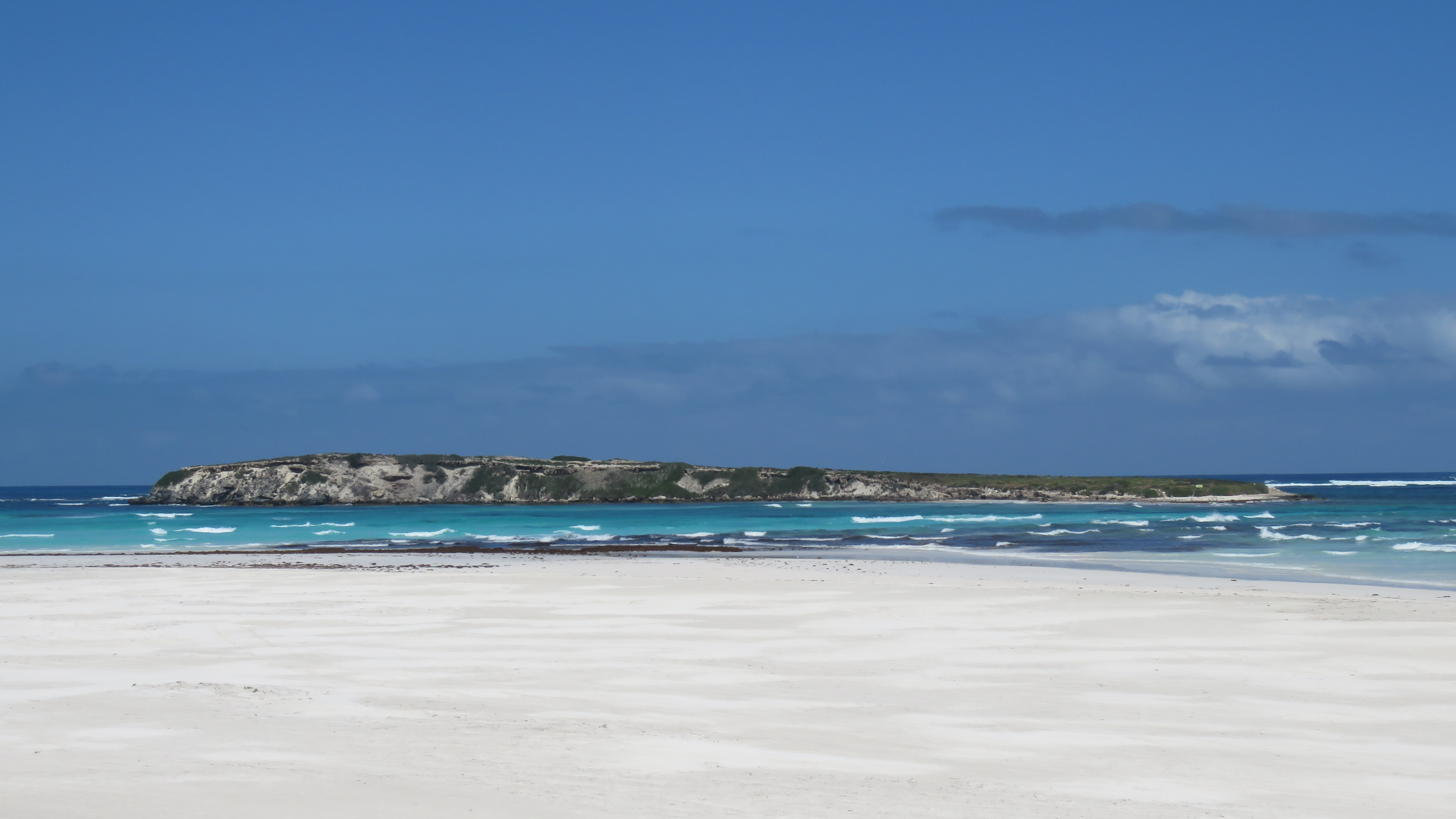
- Wedge Island seen from the north

Geography
- Location: Indian Ocean
- Coordinates: 30°49′21″S 115°11′30″E

Administration
- Australia
- State: Western Australia
- LGA: Shire of Dandaragan

Wedge Island, Wedj Boya to the Yued people, is a 400-metre-long (1,300 ft) wedge-shaped island north of Lancelin and south of Cervantes on the Western Australian coast. The island is located just south of “the point” and approximately 15 kilometres (9.3 mi) south-east of an informal settlement known as Grey. Both are within the Shire of Dandaragan.

It is located within the Jurien Bay Marine Park and part of the Wedge Island Nature Reserve.

== Geography ==
The island occupies an area of 4.03 hectares (9.96 acres) and is situated 200 metres (656 ft) from the mainland. The island has a maximum elevation of 21 metres (69 ft).

It lies within the Turquoise Coast islands nature reserve group, a chain of 40 islands spread over a distance of 150 kilometres (93 mi) from north to south.

Wedge can also be accessed in a 4WD vehicle, via the beach if the tide is out. Wedge is known for the fine white powder sand and turquoise coloured sea. The surf provides consistent wave sets for surfing. However the beach is very soft during summer and many vehicles become bogged or are swept into the water. Vehicles also have the environmental effect of compacting the sand.

The Lancelin Defence Training Area is in the dunes south-east of Wedge. There is no access through the military range. Trespassers will face large fines and possible loss of their vehicle if caught.

== History ==
Wedge Island was named after government surveyor Charles Wedge, in 1875 by Staff-Commander William Edwin Archdeacon R.N., who was in charge of the Admiralty survey of the coast of Western Australia.

One of the first pioneers of the settlement was W. R. (Bob) Wedge back in 1937; a track was pegged to the island around September by Wedge and Fred King. The first shacks were constructed in the 1940s. The settlement is now home to approximately 350 beach shacks on unvested land that are used by crayfishermen and holiday-goers. A new sealed road, Indian Ocean Drive was opened in September 2010 which provides 2WD access to Wedge. There are claims that this has changed the local environment. The road, intended to promote tourism is well known for a number of serious vehicle crashes since it opened.

Wedge is often quiet during the cooler months but during major public holidays such as Christmas, New Year's Day and Australia Day there are people in nearly every shack. Camping in the area is now officially prohibited. However it has been estimated that 14,000 individuals may use the shacks at Wedge and Grey. There is no running water, no boat ramp and generators are common without mains electricity. Wedge has an informal first aid post. Activities include four wheel driving, sand boarding, surfing and kitesurfing, fishing, swimming and snorkeling. Motorbike riding has been banned in the area surrounding Wedge Island after many accidents resulted in people needing to be air lifted to receive medical attention. The ranger now hands out fines to those caught using unlicensed vehicles in the vicinity, or leaving rubbish there.

The Wedge Island Protection Association (WIPA) was established in 1968, with its objective to ensure members can enjoy and protect the environment, heritage and community.

A man was fatally stabbed during a beach party on the northern side of Wedge in December 2013, after a brawl broke out. The New Year's Eve party involved more than 600 people.

The WA Government has considered the removal of the shacks on Wedge in line with government policy. In March 2010, the Minister for the Environment Donna Faragher announced that she would not be seeking an end to the leases at Wedge and Grey until compromise options were considered by government.

In April 2011, a Western Australian Legislative Council Standing Committee found that coastal shacks "should" be removed to protect the environment from "unplanned growth". The shack leases were due to expire on 30 June 2011, but the Wedge community won a one-year renewal for all occupied facilities.

Following amendments to the Conservation and Land Management Act in 2012, the Department of Parks and Wildlife said it no longer had the power to provide leases there. The Western Australian Government has authorised the Department of Biodiversity, Conservation and Attractions to issue licences to shack owners under the Conservation and Land Management Act 1984.

Wedge and Grey are in an area subject to summer bushfires and visitors in beach shacks are sometimes asked to relocate. At present solid fuel fires are banned at Wedge between November and March. Campfires are also prohibited for some public holidays.

During November 2024, an emergency alert was raised for parts of Wedge Island and Grey after a car crash started a bushfire. A number of residents chose to stay in their communities while the blaze burned across local access roads.

== Sources ==
- Department of Biodiversity, Conservation and Attractions (12 April 2019). Wedge and Grey DRAFT Policy Manual and Maintenance Guidelines (PDF) (Report). Department of Biodiversity, Conservation and Attractions.
- Henville, Chloe; Shepherd, Briana; Gibson, Bransen; Mundy, Garrett (28 November 2024). "Hope worst of threat has passed from bushfire near Cervantes, Wedge Island north of Perth". ABC News. Australian Broadcasting Corporation.
