= Coral Coast =

Coral Coast may refer to:

- Coral Coast, Western Australia, between Cervantes and Exmouth, Western Australia
- Coral Coast, the Coral Sea coast in the Bundaberg region of Queensland
- Coral Coast, Fiji, between Sigatoka and Suva, Fiji
