= Grey (settlement) =

Shack settlement in Western Australia

- shack settlement
- Interactive map of Grey
- Country: Australia
- State: Western Australia
- Municipality: Shire of Dandaragan

Area
  - Total: 1 km^{2} (0.39 sq mi)
- Elevation: 6 m (20 ft)
- Time zone: UTC+08:00 (Australian Western Standard Time)
- Postal code: 6521
- Website: grey.asn.au

Grey is a shack settlement of about 127 shacks in Western Australia, located within the Shire of Dandaragan and Noongar country. It is 150 km north of Perth and 20 km north of the larger shack settlement Wedge Island.

== History ==
The area that is now Grey was used as a meeting place and campsite by the Yued people. Grey was previously called Green Island and Green Islets.

Before World War II, wheatbelt farmers built shacks for use while they were in the area, and continued to do so into the late 1940s.

In the 1950s, the population of Grey increased as fishing became a more lucrative profession in the area due to the commercial expansion of the Western Rock Lobster fishery, and the area became a small fishing village.

By the 1960s, there were around 50 shacks at the settlement. Around 40 were used by professional fishers, and the rest for recreational use by nearby farmers and families from Perth. In 1974 the Grey Community Association, later renamed the Grey Conservation and Community Association, was created.

By the 1980s nearby shack settlements Cervantes and Jurien Bay had been developed into towns, and over-fishing in Grey resulted in most professional fishing families moving to the towns and families from Perth moving to the shacks at Grey. It is likely that the reason was not also developed into a town at the time was due to the difficulty of managing the dunes. In 1989 a fire burnt down three shacks, which were rebuilt by the community. In the same year, the Western Australian government introduced the Illegal Occupation of Coastal Crown Land (Squatters) policy which made it illegal to build new settlements on crown land in the state.

In 2010 The National Trust of Australia recommended that the settlement be added to the Western Australian Heritage List, which led to a parliamentary enquiry where the WA government refused to add the site to the list. The settlement is included in the National Trust Heritage Register.

In 2018, there were 127 shacks at Grey. In 2024, a large bushfire, which was prevented from reaching the town by the sandunes, blocked the only road out of Grey stopping residents from evacuating. Residents were told to stay in the area for their safety, but were later rescued by boat.

== Organisation and culture ==
Grey has a culture of self-responsibility with few formal rules. It is common for residents have nicknames at Grey that may not be used in other communities they are a part of. Non-permanent residents put up a flag when they arrive to show they welcome visitors. Newcomers to the area are called "wood ducks" by locals. Many residents meet at a part of the beach called "the point" at sunset.

The Grey Conservation and Community Association liaisons with the Department of Biodiversity, Conservation and Attractions (DBCA)'s Parks and Wildlife staff on behalf of the community. They produce a newsletter that is published four times a year, create social events, help provide accommodation and activities for Canteen weekend trips as well as organising busy bees, beach cleaning, shrub planting to manage dune movement, and demolition (and sometimes rebuilding) of derelict shacks.

Shacks are self-made, typically of timber and corrugated iron, and highly personalised. Shacks are often named, with some being Love Shack and Scumbag Flats. All utilities in the settlement are off-the-grid. Grey has many community spaces, including a monument to people who have had their ashes scattered at Grey, a tennis court, community notice board, and community fridge.

Grey is mostly used for long but temporary stays by families from Perth, but has a few permanent residents of fishing families and retirees. While some visitors are casual, most spend a significant amount of time there and see Grey as a second home, with family links to the settlement going back generations and express a strong sense of connection to the settlement, community, and nature of Grey.

== Government response ==
The Grey settlement is illegal, with no approval or permission from the Western Australian government.

=== Department of Biodiversity, Conservation and Attractions (DBCA) ===
The land the settlement is on is part of the Nambung National Park, owned by the Western Australian Department of Biodiversity, Conservation and Attractions (DBCA).

The DBCA has put various restrictions on the town in an attempt make living there more difficult for residents, including not allowing people to stay more than 183 days a year, requiring that shack owners pay a lease, and restricting the sale of a shack after the owner dies. The area has limited legal fishing zones compared to other areas nearby, which some residents believe is also an attempt to discourage fishers to live there. The DBCA requires all shack owners to have a license (under the Conservation and Land Management Act 1984). These licenses do not allow shack owners to make changes, including structural improvements, to their shack.

The DBCA has had multiple enquiries and plans to remove the shacks, but this has never been successful. The DBCA is attempting to find solutions with the shack owners and the Grey Conservation and Community Association, but no agreement has been finalised as of 2018.

=== Local government ===
The Shire of Dandaragan council have been trying to remove the locals for decades, and have removed over 670 shacks from other settlements in the sea. Council president Leslee Holmes said "When the Indian Ocean Drive went through, they were meant to be demolished [...] each government hasn’t had the guts to do that."
