= Edwards Island (Western Australia) =

Island of Western Australia

Coordinates: 31°01′48″S 115°19′23″E

Location of Edwards Island in the Indian Ocean

Edwards Island, also known as Edward Island, is an island in Western Australia near Lancelin.

The island occupies an area of 0.454 hectares (1 acre) with a maximum elevation of 5 metres (16 ft) and is situated approximately 100 metres (328 ft) off the coast. It is composed of limestone and is linked to Lancelin Island by intertidal and subtidal reef platforms. Both islands are gazetted as A Class nature reserves.

Along with Lancelin Island it is at the southern end of the Turquoise Coast islands nature reserve group, a chain of 40 islands spread over a distance of 150 kilometres (93 mi).

The first European to discover the island was the French explorer Hamelin in 1801 aboard Naturaliste, who named Lancelin Island.

== See also ==
- List of islands of Western Australia
