= Lady Williams (apple) =

Apple cultivar

Malus domestica Lady Williams
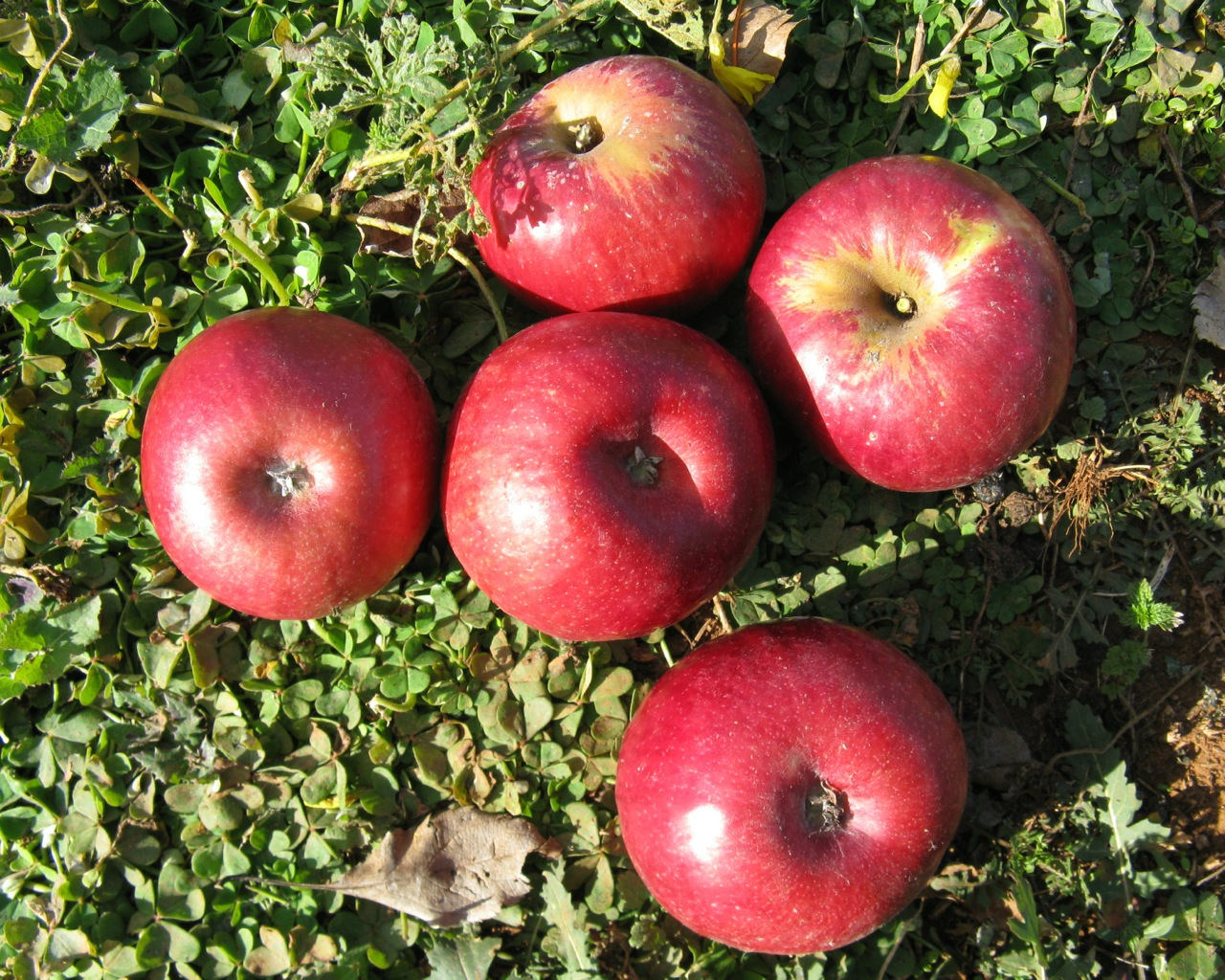
- Cultivar: Lady Williams
- Origin: Australia 1935

Lady Williams is a cultivar of apple; the fruits are eaten fresh and mature very late in the season. The original tree was a chance seedling, thought to be from Granny Smith, with pollen from either Jonathan or Rokewood. Maud and Arthur Williams owned the farm in Donnybrook, Western Australia, on which the tree that this chance seedling sprung from. Maud was instrumental in recognizing the potential of this new apple and it is named after her. Lady Williams is the pollen parent of Cripps Pink, Cripps Red and Western Dawn (Enchanted).
