= Posidonia robertsoniae =

Scientific classification
- Kingdom: Plantae
- Clade: Embryophytes
- Clade: Tracheophytes
- Clade: Spermatophytes
- Clade: Angiosperms
- Clade: Monocots
- Order: Alismatales
- Family: Posidoniaceae
- Genus: Posidonia
- Species: P. robertsoniae

Binomial name
- Posidonia robertsoniae Cambridge and J.Kuo

Species of aquatic plant

Posidonia robertsoniae is one of the seagrasses of Western Australia, submerged flowering plants that occur in the southern coastal waters.

== Description ==
A species of Posidonia, submerged flowering plants found in Mediterranean climates. A perennial rhizomatous herb that appears as stands in marine habitat. This species is found at depths from 0.5 to 20 metres on white sands, in coastal waters that may be sheltered or subject to intense wave action. The habit of Posidonia robertsoniae is as a clumping stand, it is rhizomatous plant that puts out shoots with one or two leaves. The leaf blades are 2.5 to 4 millimetres wide, and 1.5 metres long. They are slightly leathery and uneven on the upper surfaces. Between 6 and 9 veins appear on each leaf. The flowering period is primarily during the months of August and September.

== Distribution ==
Posidonia robertsoniae is recorded at coasts of Southwest Australia, from Warnbro Sound to Israelite Bay.

== Taxonomy ==
This species is contained by the Posidoniaceae family, one of eight occurring in southern Australia. The ninth member, Posidonia oceanica, is found in the Mediterranean sea. The species was first described in Aquatic Botany in 1984, based on a holotype collected at King George Sound in 1981. Several related species within Posidonia are described as the Posidonia ostenfeldii complex, a group that may be in need of revision. The species Posidonia coriacea, which occurs in a wider distribution range, and this one may not be distinct, both lack evidence of genetic variation. The differing morphology of these species may be subject to environmental influence and their characters can overlap.
