= Beagle Islands (Western Australia) =

Islands of Western Australia

Coordinates: 29°48′30″S 114°52′31″E

Location of Beagle Islands in Western Australia

The Beagle Islands are a small group of islands in Western Australia, found approximately 15 kilometres (9 mi) northwest of Leeman.

== Island group ==
The Beagle Islands are a group of three individual islands:

- North West Beagle Island with an area of 0.5 hectares (1.2 acres) located 8.6 kilometres (5.3 mi) from the mainland.
- East Beagle Island with an area of 1.5 hectares (3.7 acres) located 8.3 kilometres (5.2 mi) from the mainland.
- South West Beagle Island with an area of 0.5 hectares (1.2 acres) located 8.6 kilometres (5.3 mi) from the mainland.

The group is at the northern end of the Turquoise Coast islands group, a chain of 40 islands spread over a distance of 150 kilometres (93 mi). The Beagle Islands are located in the Beagle Islands Nature Reserve, which was declared in 1962.

== Geology ==
The islands formed approximately 10,000 years ago after large fluctuations in sea levels caused erosion on large areas of the continental shelf during periods of glaciation. Large parallel sand dunes then formed and hardened into limestone, forming islands, most of which have been separated from the mainland for 6,500 years.

Well preserved Tamala limestone geological features can be found on all of the Turquoise Coast islands, with supra-tidal hard coral fossils being found on the Beagle Islands.

== Sea lions ==
The islands are home to the largest population of Australian sea lions in Western Australia, The breeding colony is estimated to be between 150 and 250 animals depending on the breeding cycle. East Beagle island is also home to the tree-like form of the Nitre Bush, an important habitat for sea lions when pupping.

== Wreck ==
In 1905 a boat was reported as being wrecked near the islands, and in 1934 a fisherman drowned after being swept overboard.

== See also ==
- List of islands of Western Australia
