= Lancelin Island skink =

Conservation status
- Critically Endangered (IUCN 3.1)

Scientific classification
- Kingdom: Animalia
- Phylum: Chordata
- Class: Reptilia
- Order: Squamata
- Family: Scincidae
- Genus: Ctenotus
- Species: C. lancelini

Binomial name
- Ctenotus lancelini Ford, 1969

Synonyms
- Ctenotus labillardieri lancelini Ford, 1969; Ctenotus lancelini — Cogger, 1983

Species of lizard

The Lancelin Island skink (Ctenotus lancelini), also known commonly as the Lancelin south-west ctenotus and the south-west ctenotus, is a species of skink, a lizard in the subfamily Sphenomorphinae of the family Scincidae. It can only be found on Lancelin Island in Western Australia.

== Etymology ==
The specific name, lancelini, refers to Lancelin Island in Western Australia where it is an endemic species.

== Description ==
C. lancelini may attain a snout-to-vent length (SVL) of 8 cm (3.1 in). Dorsally, it is brown on the body, fading to gray on the tail. The flanks are striped and spotted with black and white. The legs are yellow or orange, with dark brown streaks.

== Habitat and behavior ==
The preferred natural habitat of C. lancelini is rocky areas of grassland and shrubland, where it shelters under limestone slabs and in burrows of seabirds.

== Reproduction ==
C. lancelini is oviparous.

== Taxonomy ==
C. lancelini is a member of the C. labillardieri species group.

== See also ==
- Lancelin, Western Australia
