= Cripps Red =

Apple cultivar

Malus domestica
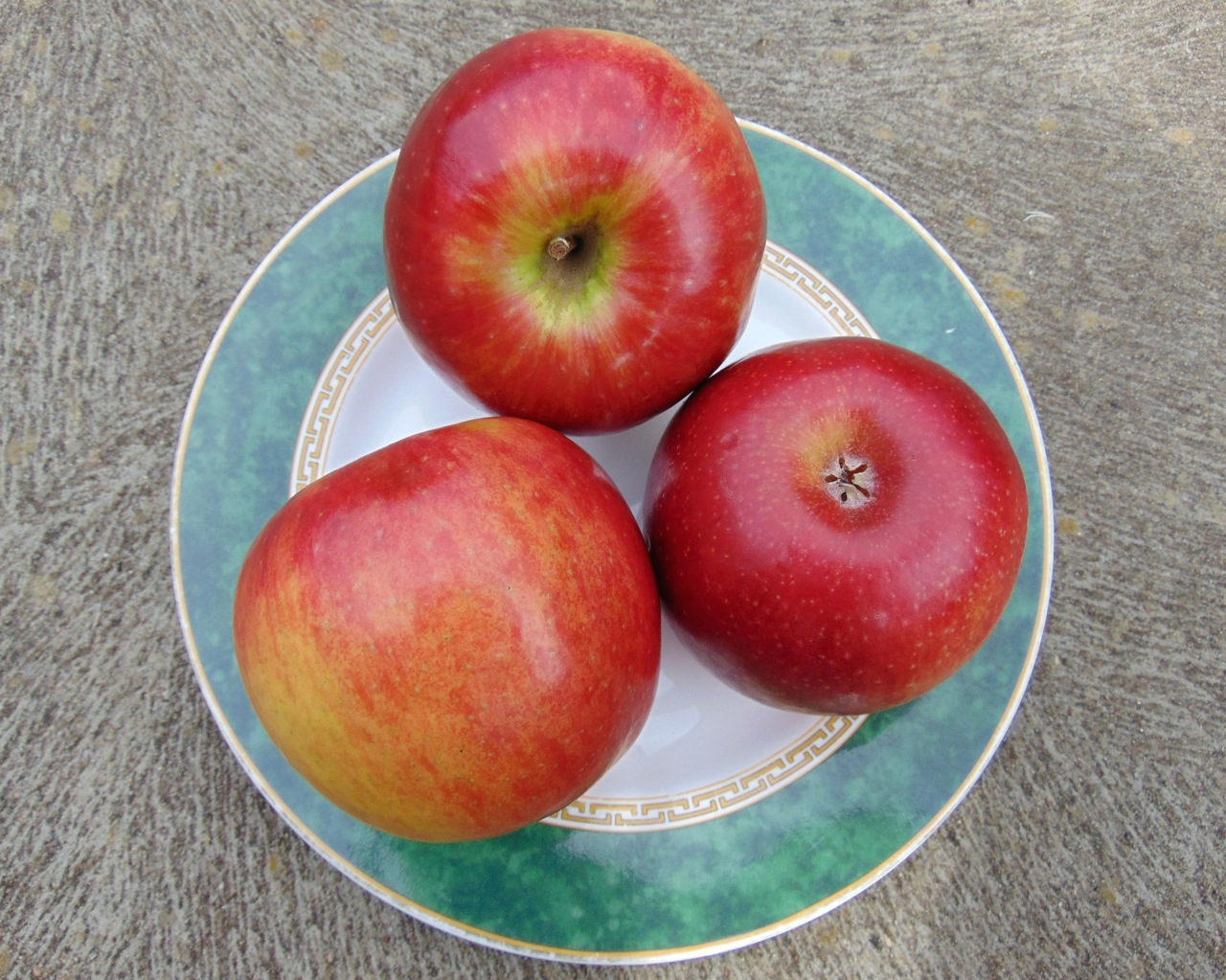
- Cultivar: Cripps Red
- Origin: Australia, 1973

Cripps Red is a cultivar of apples; the fruit are eaten fresh. The original tree was bred by John Cripps from Golden Delicious × Lady Williams. The fruit mature very late in the season. Cripps Red fruit can be marketed as Sundowner apples, if they are sufficiently good quality and are also sold as Joya in Europe. Cripps Pink (Pink Lady) and Western Dawn (Enchanted) apples have the same parentage as Cripps Red.
