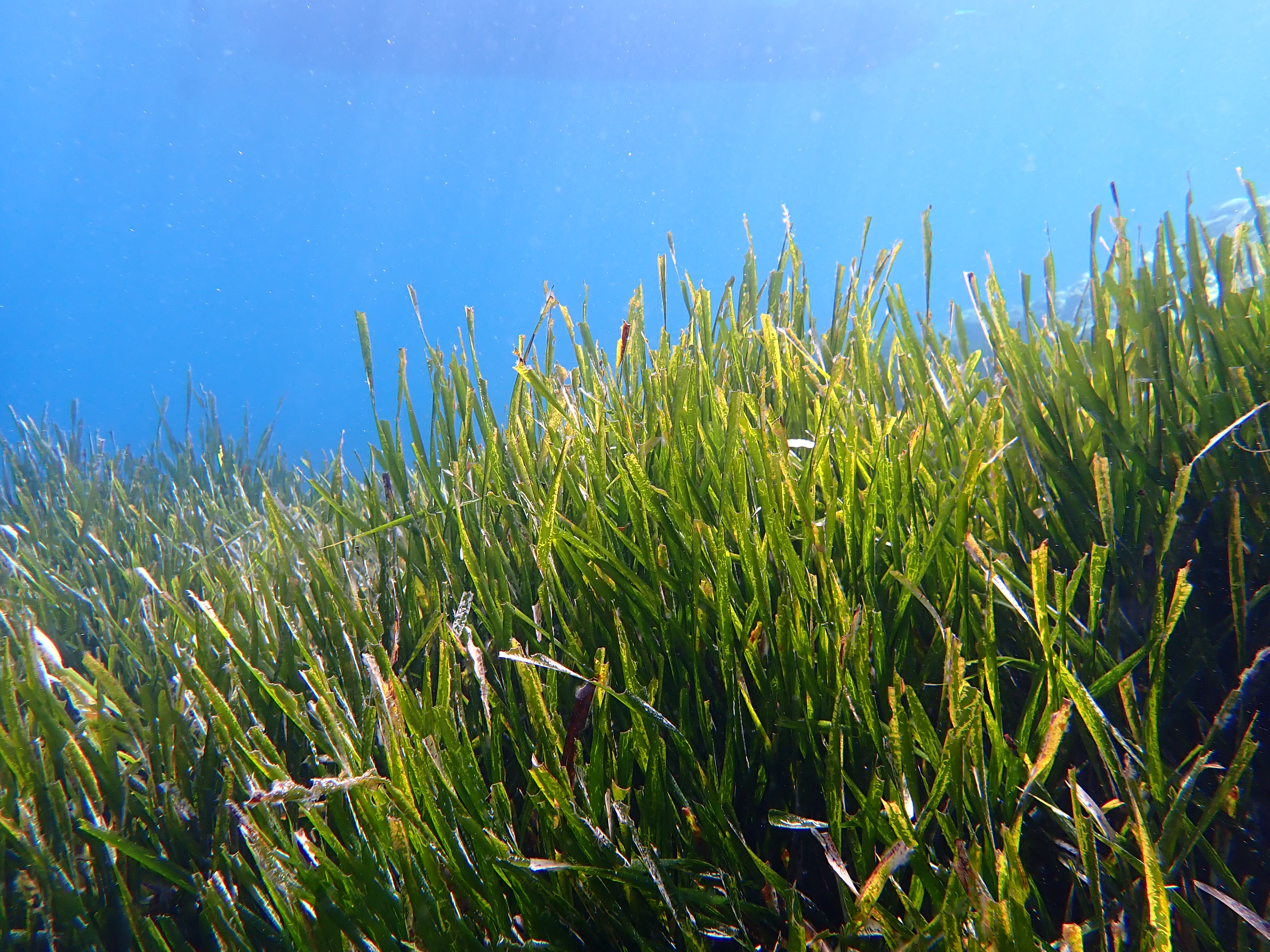
- Posidonia oceanica

Scientific classification
- Kingdom: Plantae
- Clade: Tracheophytes
- Clade: Angiosperms
- Clade: Monocots
- Order: Alismatales
- Family: Posidoniaceae; Hutch.
- Genus: Posidonia; K.D.Koenig

Type species
- Posidonia oceanica L.

Species
- See text
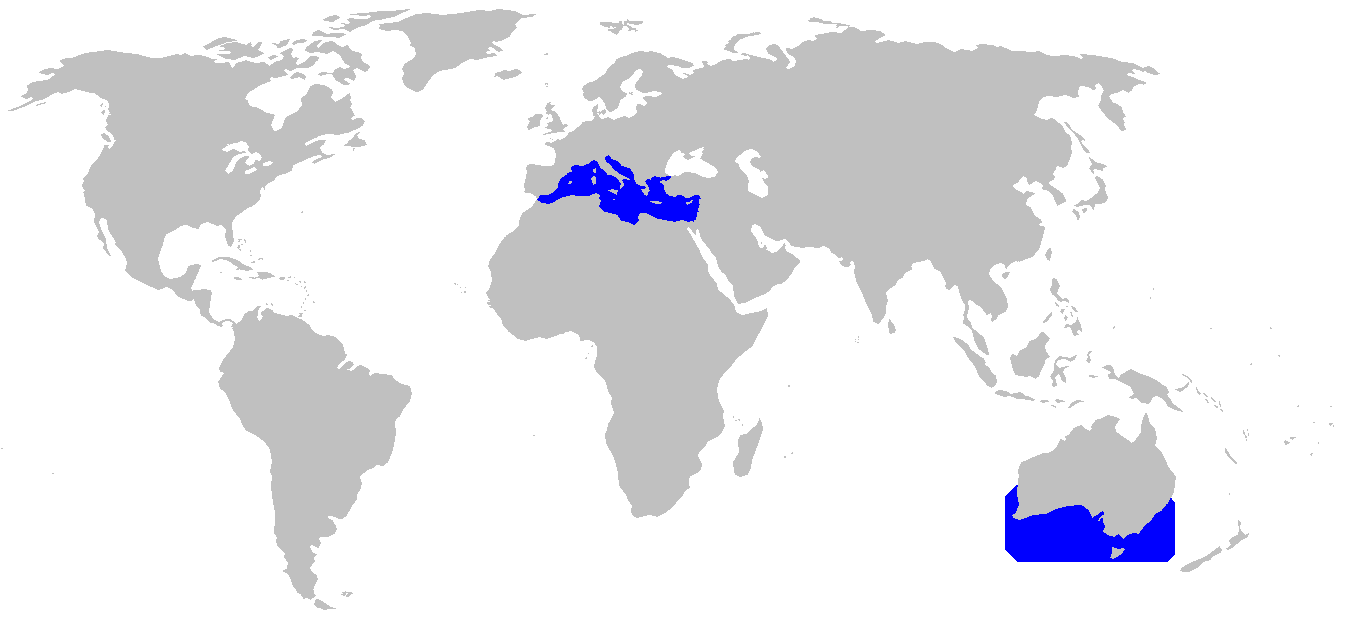
- Posidonia distribution range

Synonyms
- Aegle Dulac; Alga Boehm.; Caulinia DC., nom. illeg.; Kernera Willd., nom. illeg.; Posidonion St.-Lag., orth. var.; Taenidium Targ.Tozz.

= Posidonia =

Posidonia Temporal range: Maastrichtian - recent

Genus of aquatic plants

Posidonia is a genus of flowering plants. It contains nine species of marine plants ("seagrass"), found in the seas of the Mediterranean and around the south coast of Australia.

The APG system (1998) and APG II system (2003) accept this genus as constituting the sole genus in the family Posidoniaceae, which it places in the order Alismatales, in the clade monocots. The AP-Website concludes that the three families Cymodoceaceae, Posidoniaceae and Ruppiaceae form a monophyletic group. Earlier systems classified this genus in the family Potamogetonaceae or in the family Posidoniaceae but belonging to order Zosterales.

Posidonia oceanica has nitrogen fixation capabilities via symbiosis and other species may as well.

== Species ==
This is a list of species that are contained by the genus:

- Posidonia angustifolia Cambridge and Kuo
- Posidonia australis Hook.f. South coast of Australia.
- Posidonia coriacea Cambridge and Kuo
- Posidonia denhartogii Kuo and Cambridge
- Posidonia kirkmanii Kuo and Cambridge
- Posidonia oceanica (L.) Delile – This plant is endemic to the Mediterranean Sea, where it forms undersea meadows.
- Posidonia ostenfeldii den Hartog
- Posidonia robertsoniae Kuo and Cambridge
- Posidonia sinuosa Cambridge and Kuo

The species described by Linnaeus, Posidonia oceanica, is found in the Mediterranean; the rest are located around the southern coast of Australia. Some species are endemic seagrasses of Western Australia, all the Australian species are found in that region's diverse habitats. This arrangement was divided into two complexes: the Posidonia australis and Posidonia ostenfeldii groups. Some species descriptions may only be regional characteristics, and may need further revision.

In 2006 a clonal colony of P. oceanica was discovered south of the island of Ibiza which measured 8 km across and is possibly up to 100,000 years old.
