= Batavia Coast =

Coast in Western Australia

Commonly used Bureau of Meteorology coastal landmarks

Batavia Coast is a name attributed to a section of the coastline of Western Australia, in the region close to the vicinity of the site of the wreck of the Batavia in the Abrolhos Islands.

It lies north of the Sunset Coast and Turquoise Coast. In the early 1990s, maps of the coast included the main place on the coast as Geraldton, with Kalbarri as the northernmost location, and Jurien and Cervantes at the southern end.

In 2001 it had considerable planning for the strategies for conservation and management of the coast.

== See also ==
- Coastline of Western Australia
- Batavia Coast Tourist Way
