= Lancelin Island =

Island of Western Australia

Coordinates: 31°00′23″S 115°19′00″E

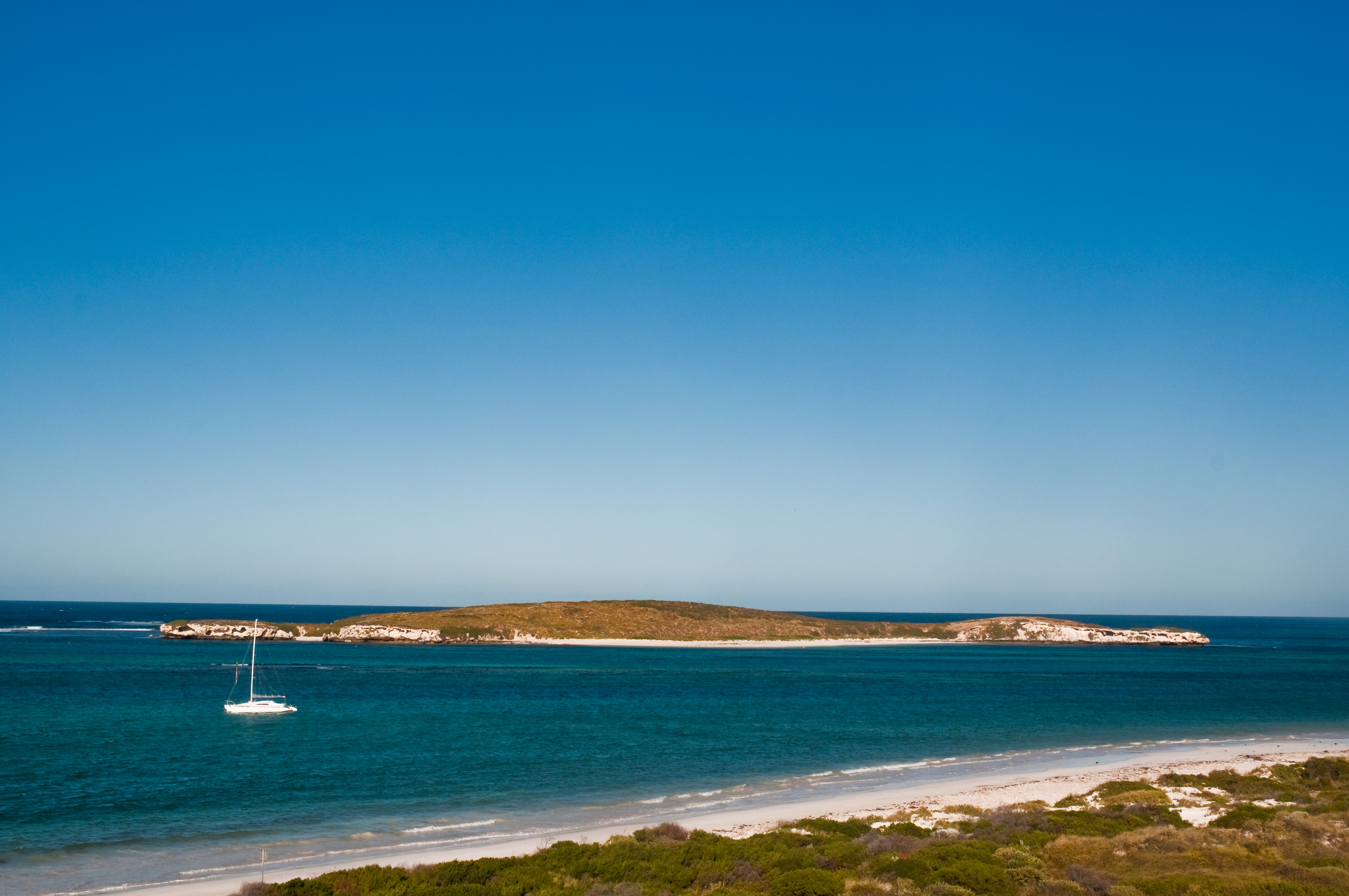
Lancelin Island

Location of Lancelin Island in the Indian Ocean

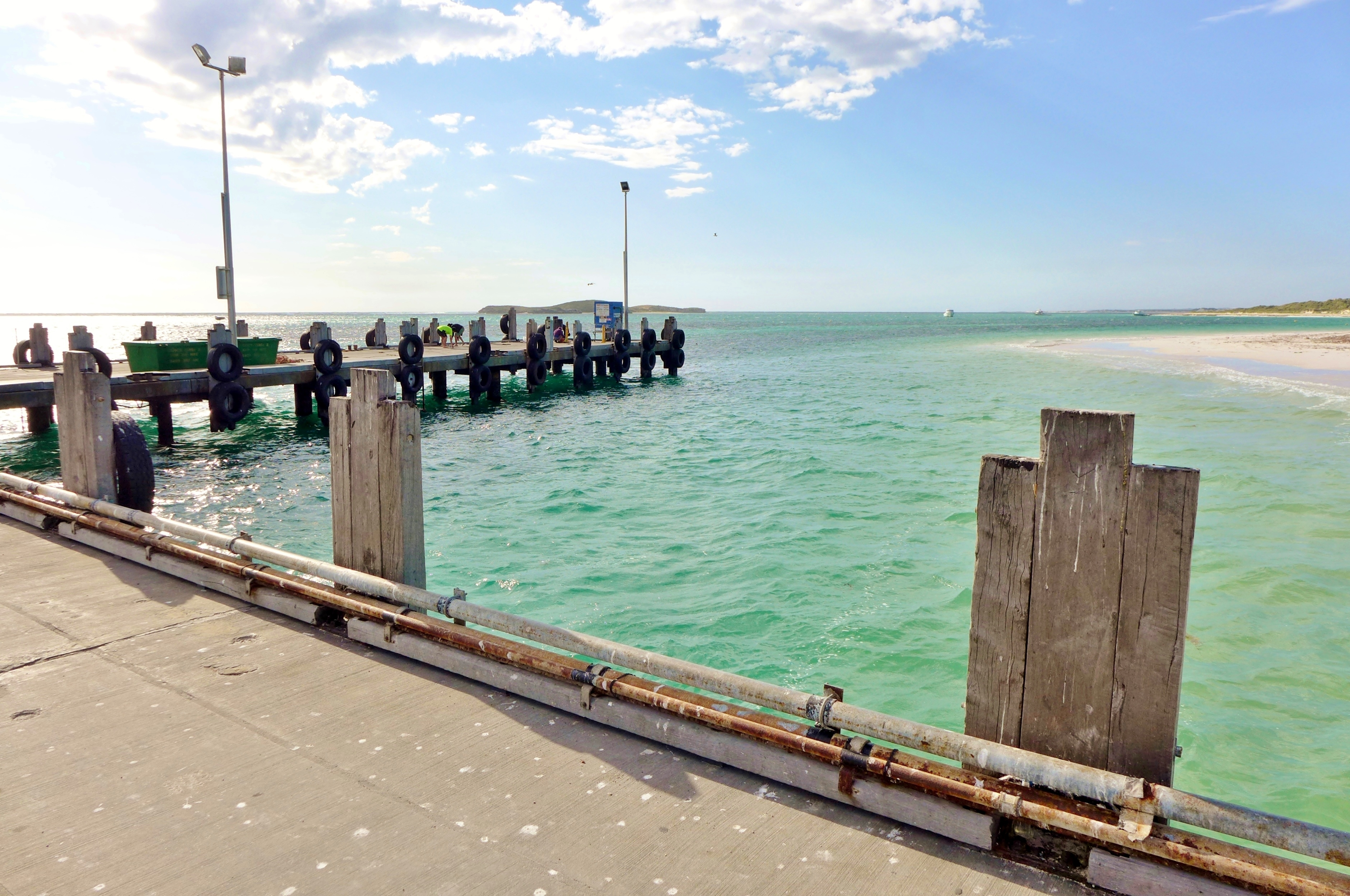
Lancelin Jetty with Lancelin Island in the background

Lancelin Island is an island in Western Australia near Lancelin.

== Description ==
The island occupies an area 8.16 hectares (20 acres) and is situated 600 metres (1,969 ft) from the mainland. The island has a maximum elevation of 27 m (89 ft). It is composed of limestone and is linked to Edwards Island by intertidal and subtidal reef platforms. Both islands are gazetted as A Class nature reserves.

The island has a large beach on the landward side of the island and a smaller beach on the seaward side. The waters off the western side of the island are also a protected area, the Lancelin Island Lagoon Fish Habitat Protection Area, made up of areas of seagrass and reef systems.

Along with Edwards Island it is at the southern end of the Turquoise Coast islands nature reserve group, a chain of 40 islands spread over a distance of 150 kilometres (93 mi).

== Origin and history ==
The island was formed approximately 10,000 years ago after large fluctuations in sea levels caused erosion on large areas of the continental shelf during periods of glaciation. Large parallel sand dunes then formed and hardened into limestone, forming islands, most of which have been separated from the mainland for 6,500 years.

The Noongar peoples are the traditional inhabitants of the Lancelin area.

The first European to find and name the island was the French explorer Hamelin in 1801 aboard Naturaliste. It was named after the scientific writer, P. J. Lancelin.

During the 1920s the area became popular as a holiday destination, with many shacks appearing on the mainland. During World War II the island was used by the Royal Australian Air Force for bombing practice. The crayfishing industry commenced operations in the area in 1947.

== Flora and fauna ==
The island has a high diversity of plants and supports over 50 plant species. The vegetation is mostly close to the ground and composed mostly of salt-tolerant grasses and shrubs. Sandier places are dominated by a low heath with shallower soils over limestone areas supporting herbfields and grasslands. The nitre bush covers the slopes and plateau of the island. Sea birds are known to inhabit the island with some species using the island as a breeding site. The Lancelin Island skink (Ctenotus lancelini), a threatened species of lizard, is endemic to and named after the island. Sea lions are known to visit the island but do not use it as a breeding site.

The Lancelin Island Lagoon Fish Habitat Protection Area has had over 200 species of flora and fauna that have been identified within the area.

== See also ==
- List of islands of Western Australia
