= Posidonia ostenfeldii =

Conservation status
- Least Concern (IUCN 3.1)

Scientific classification
- Kingdom: Plantae
- Clade: Tracheophytes
- Clade: Angiosperms
- Clade: Monocots
- Order: Alismatales
- Family: Posidoniaceae
- Genus: Posidonia
- Species: P. ostenfeldii

Binomial name
- Posidonia ostenfeldii Hartog

Species of aquatic plant

Posidonia ostenfeldii is a species of seagrass that occurs in the southern waters of Australia.

== Description ==
A species of Posidonia. A perennial rhizomatous herb that appears as clumps on sand in marine habitat. It is found at depths between 1 and 15 metres (0 and 50 ft). The leaf blades are 6–12 mm (1/4–1/2 in) wide.

== Distribution ==
This species is found in waters around the southern coast of Australia. Posidonia ostenfeldii is recorded at the edge of the Esperance Plains, the Archipelago of the Recherche, at the southern coast of Southwest Australia.

== Taxonomy ==
This species is contained by the Posidoniaceae family, one of eight occurring in southern Australia. The ninth member, Posidonia oceanica, is found in the mediterranean sea. Several related species within Posidonia are described as the Posidonia ostenfeldii complex.
