= Turquoise Coast (Western Australia) =

Coastal region in Western Australia

Coordinates: 30.4205°S 115.0501°E

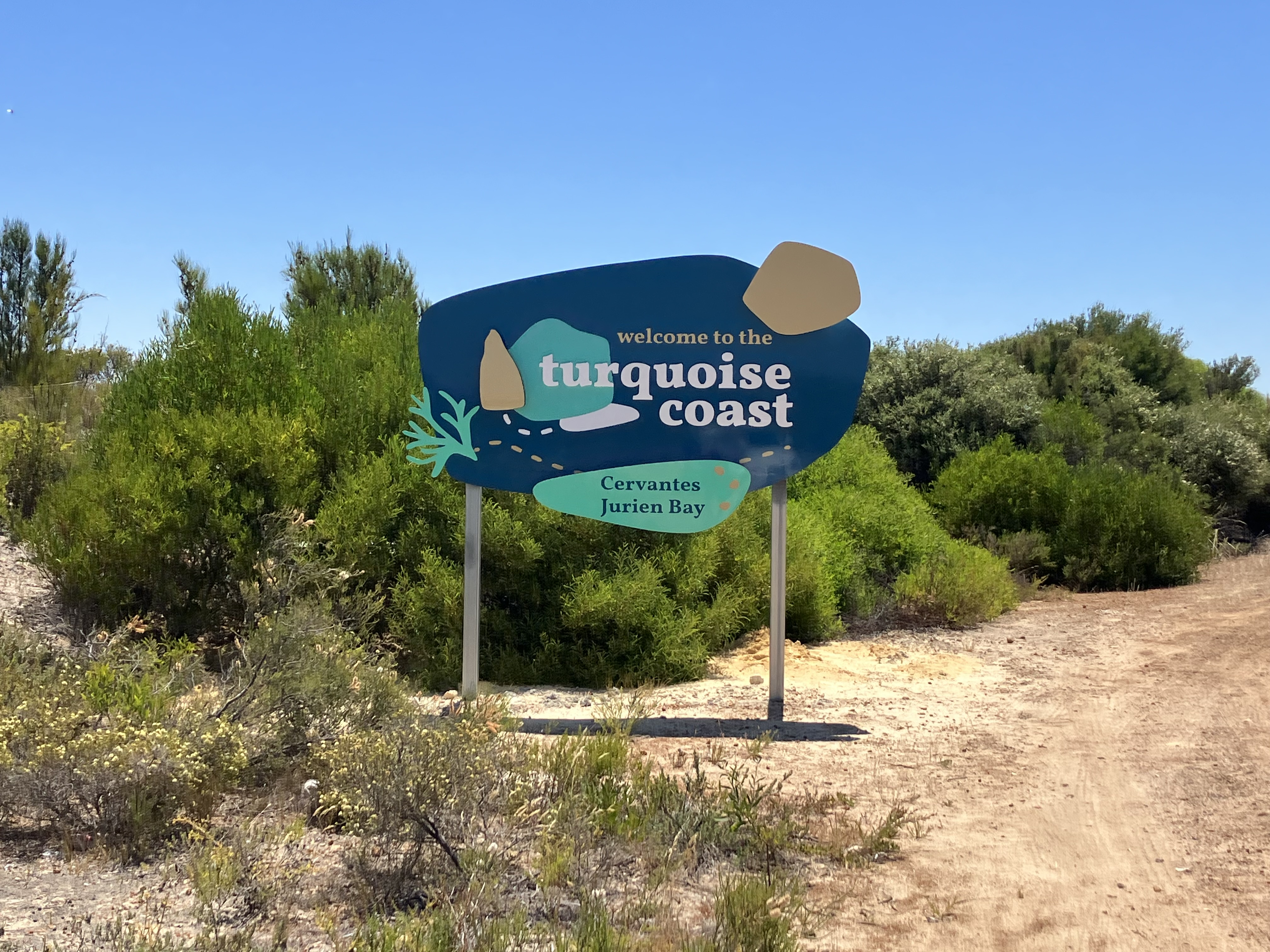
Turquoise Coast sign on Indian Ocean Drive

Commonly used Bureau of Meteorology coastal landmarks

Turquoise Coast is a name attributed to a section of the coastline of Western Australia in the vicinity of Jurien Bay. It lies south of Batavia Coast and north of the Sunset Coast.

The area contains the Turquoise Coast islands nature reserves group, a chain of 40 islands spread over a distance of 150 kilometres (93 mi), as well as the following parks:

- Jurien Bay Marine Park
- Nambung National Park
- Badgingarra National Park

Islands in the reserves include:

- Beagle Islands
- Cervantes Islands
- Edwards Island
- Escape Island
- Favorite Island
- Lancelin Island
- Wedge Island
- Whitlock Island
