= Posidonia coriacea =

Conservation status
- Least Concern (IUCN 3.1)

Scientific classification
- Kingdom: Plantae
- Clade: Tracheophytes
- Clade: Angiosperms
- Clade: Monocots
- Order: Alismatales
- Family: Posidoniaceae
- Genus: Posidonia
- Species: P. coriacea

Binomial name
- Posidonia coriacea Cambridge & J.Kuo

Species of plant

Posidonia coriacea is a species of seagrass that occurs in the southern waters of Australia.

== Description ==
A species of Posidonia. A perennial rhizomatous herb that appears as stands in marine habitat. This species is found at depths from 1 to 30 metres on white sands, in areas subject to intense wave action. The leaf blades are 2.5 to 7 millimetres wide, and 1.25 metres long. Two or three leaves, with large bases, appear from each shoot. They are leathery and thickened convexly on the upper and lower surfaces. Between 7 and 11 veins appear on each leaf. The leaf sheath breaks into strips, rather than the fibrous detritus of similar species. The flowering period is primarily during the months of August and September.

== Distribution ==
Posidonia coriacea is recorded at Shark Bay, Western Australia, around coasts of Southwest Australia, and across the Bight to South Australia.

== Taxonomy ==
This species is contained by the Posidoniaceae family, one of eight occurring in southern Australia. The ninth member, Posidonia oceanica, is found in the Mediterranean Sea. Several related species within Posidonia are described as the Posidonia ostenfeldii complex.
