= Sunset Coast =

Coastal region in Western Australia

Coordinates: 31°53′40″S 115°45′17″E

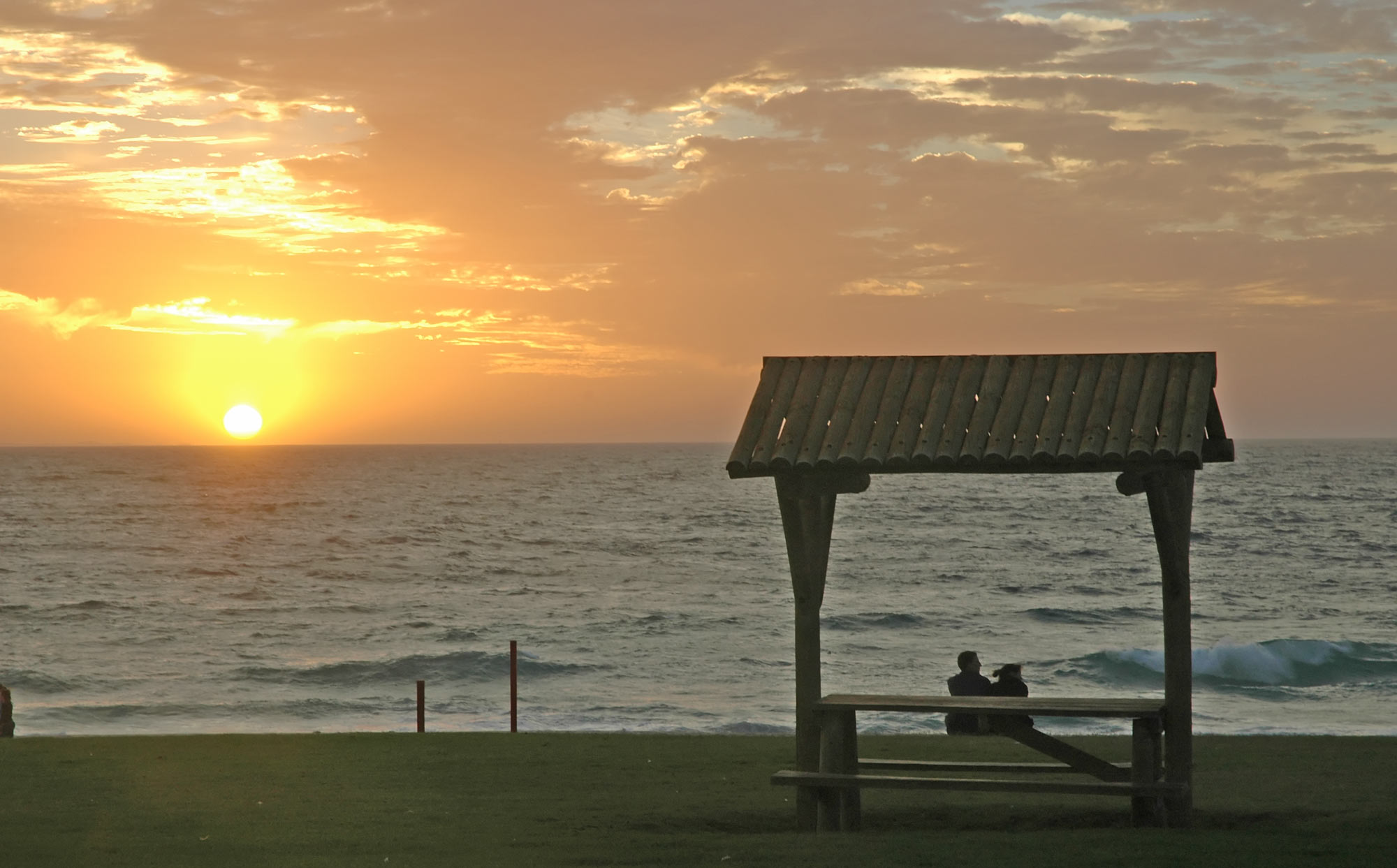
Sunset at Sunset Coast

Sunset Coast is the name given to the coastal section of the northern metropolitan area of Perth, the capital city of Western Australia. While the name is not in extensive use locally, with its many white sand beaches Sunset Coast has been a centrepiece of Western Australian tourism planning since the 1990s and is used in interstate and overseas marketing of the region.

The Sunset Coast is one of the six tourism precincts in the region of Perth and surrounding areas, which the Perth Region Tourism Organisation, trading as Destination Perth and funded in part by Tourism Western Australia, was established in 2004 to market.

== Boundaries ==
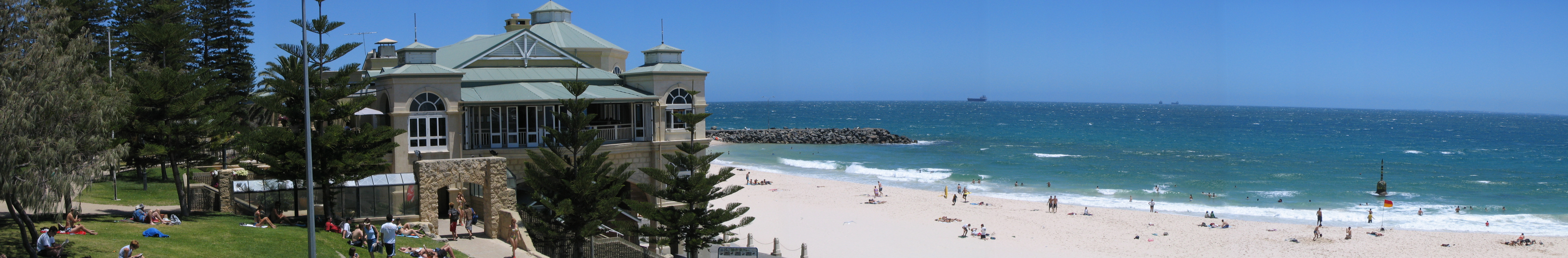
Cottesloe Beach

The boundaries of the Sunset Coast are vague. Some suggest that it stretches only over 50 kilometres (31 mi) of the coastline of the Cities of Stirling, Joondalup, and Wanneroo. Others claim the region starts at Cottesloe and includes the Scarborough precinct, Trigg Beach, Hillarys Boat Harbour, Mindarie Keys and Perth's northernmost beach at Two Rocks, which contains a marina and was formerly home to the Atlantis Marine Park. Yet others seem to indicate it stretches as far south as including Port Beach in North Fremantle, and Tourism Western Australia suggests it to reach as far north as including the town of Lancelin, 125 kilometres (78 mi) north of Perth, well outside the Perth metropolitan area.

== Administrative ==
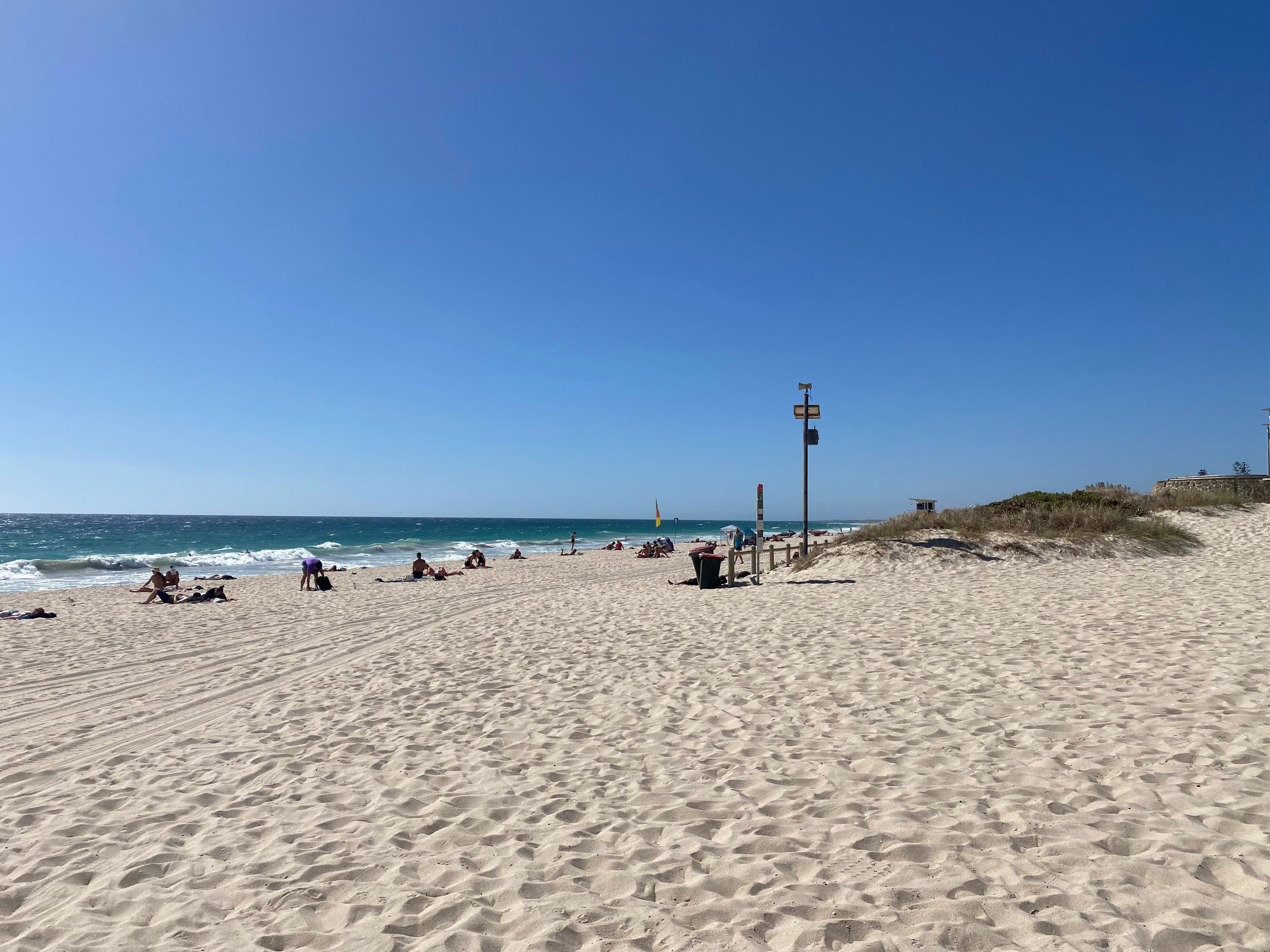
Scarborough Beach

The region includes the following nine local government areas, or parts thereof, listed from south to north:

1. City of Fremantle
2. Town of Mosman Park
3. Town of Cottesloe
4. City of Nedlands with Swanbourne
5. Town of Cambridge with City Beach and Floreat
6. City of Stirling with Scarborough and Trigg
7. City of Joondalup with Sorrento, Hillarys, Mullaloo and Burns Beach
8. City of Wanneroo with Mindarie, Quinns Rocks, Yanchep and Two Rocks
9. Shire of Gingin with Lancelin

== Attractions and facilities ==
- Marmion Marine Park, off the coast from Trigg Island to Burns Beach, is home to many marine mammals who can be seen active in their natural environment.
- North of Marmion is Hillarys Boat Harbour, which includes Sorrento Quay and AQWA (formerly Underwater World).
- Popular activities include windsurfing, kitesurfing, fishing and swimming.
- Sculpture by the Sea, an annual public exhibition of sculptures held at Cottesloe Beach.
- Wanneroo Show, one of the biggest community events in the Sunset Coast.

== See also ==
- Coastal regions of Western Australia
- Sunset Coast Tourist Drive
- Turquoise Coast (Western Australia)
