= Shire of Dandaragan =

Local government area in the Wheatbelt region of Western Australia

Coordinates: 30°17′49″S 115°02′31″E

- Local government area
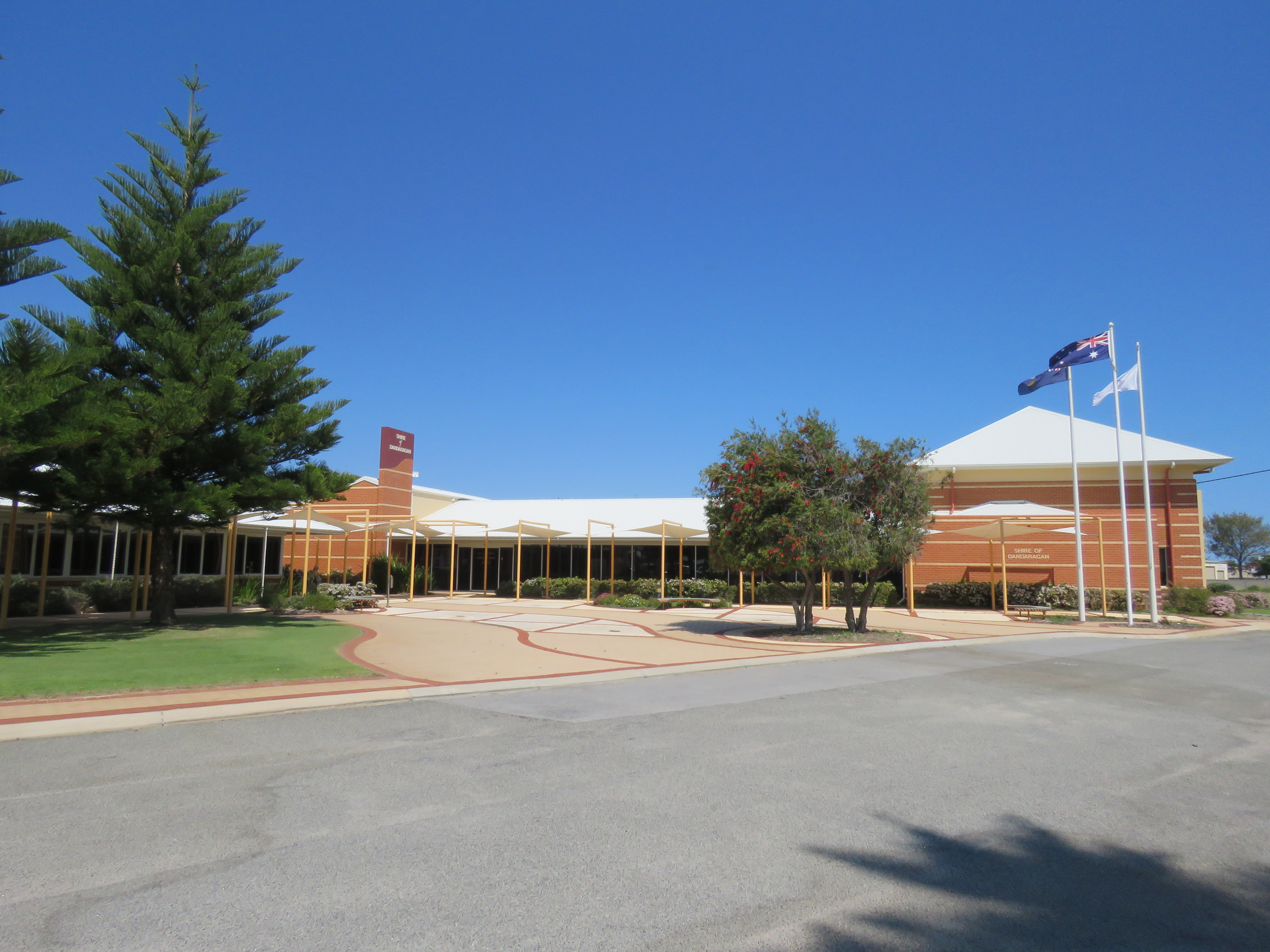
- The Dandaragan shire offices in Jurien Bay

- Interactive map of Shire of Dandaragan
- Country: Australia
- State: Western Australia
- Region: Wheatbelt
- Established: 1890
- Council seat: Jurien Bay

Government
  - Shire President: Tony O'Gorman
  - State electorate: Moore
  - Federal division: Durack

Area
  - Total: 6,716.3 km^{2} (2,593.2 sq mi)

Population
  - Total: 3,355 (LGA 2021)
- Website: Shire of Dandaragan
LGAs around Shire of Dandaragan
Coorow	Coorow
Shire of Dandaragan	Moora
Gingin	Victoria Plains

The Shire of Dandaragan is a local government area located in the Wheatbelt region of Western Australia, about 200 kilometres (124 mi) north of the state capital, Perth. The shire covers an area of 6,716 square kilometres (2,593 sq mi) and its seat of government is the town of Jurien Bay.

== History ==
The Dandaraga Road District was created on 27 February 1890. It was renamed the Dandaragan Road District on 22 July 1932. On 1 July 1961, it became a shire following the enactment of the Local Government Act 1960, which reformed all remaining road districts into shires.

Until the late 1960s it was a sparsely populated agricultural shire, but the coastal towns of Jurien Bay and Cervantes and the popularity of The Pinnacles Desert with tourists have helped to fuel the shire's growth. Originally the shire's main administration centre was in the small town of Dandaragan, however due to the disproportionate population growth in the town of Jurien Bay the administration was relocated there in 2003.

== Wards ==
On 22 May 1971, the shire was divided into Coastal, Central, North and South wards, and its representation increased from seven to nine councillors. Over time, the Coastal ward increased in size, and ultimately on 2 May 1987, the ward was abolished and two new wards, Cervantes and Jurien, were created. By 3 November 1989, the following wards existed:

- Jurien Ward (three councillors)
- Cervantes Ward (two councillors)
- Badgingarra Ward (two councillors) (formerly North Ward)
- Dandaragan Ward (three councillors) (formerly South Ward)

On 7 May 2005, the shire was redivided into two wards:

- North Ward (five councillors)
- South Ward (four councillors)

By the 2009 Council elections all wards had been abolished and nine councillors represent the whole shire.

== Towns and localities ==
The towns and localities of the Shire of Dandaragan with population and size figures based on the most recent Australian census:

Locality	Population	Area	Map
Badgingarra	173 (SAL 2021)	1,126.6 km^{2} (435.0 sq mi)	
Boothendarra	31 (SAL 2021)	630 km^{2} (240 sq mi)	
Cataby	103 (SAL 2021)	178.3 km^{2} (68.8 sq mi)	
Cervantes	480 (SAL 2021)	9.8 km^{2} (3.8 sq mi)	
Cooljarloo	13 (SAL 2021)	672.2 km^{2} (259.5 sq mi)	
Dandaragan	292 (SAL 2021)	974.4 km^{2} (376.2 sq mi)	
Grey	5 (SAL 2021)	1.8 km^{2} (0.69 sq mi)	
Hill River	107 (SAL 2021)	624.4 km^{2} (241.1 sq mi)	
Jurien Bay	1,985 (SAL 2021)	525.3 km^{2} (202.8 sq mi)	
Mimegarra	11 (SAL 2021)	307.5 km^{2} (118.7 sq mi)	
Nambung	25 (SAL 2021)	577.2 km^{2} (222.9 sq mi)	
Regans Ford	25 (SAL 2016)	245.8 km^{2} (94.9 sq mi)	
Wedge Island	18 (SAL 2021)	217.05 km^{2} (83.80 sq mi)	
Yathroo	82 (SAL 2021)	624.4 km^{2} (241.1 sq mi)	

== Population ==
Historical population

Year	Pop.	±% p.a.
1911	269	—
1921	222	−1.90%
1933	240	+0.65%
1947	191	−1.62%
1954	303	+6.81%
1961	456	+6.01%
1966	619	+6.30%
1971	1,345	+16.79%
1976	1,709	+4.91%

Year	Pop.	±% p.a.
1981	1,785	+0.87%
1986	2,128	+3.58%
1991	2,363	+2.12%
1996	2,570	+1.69%
2001	2,988	+3.06%
2006	2,884	−0.71%
2011	3,185	+2.01%
2016	3,213	+0.18%
2021	3,355	+0.87%

== Heritage-listed places ==
As of 2023, 98 places are heritage-listed in the Shire of Dandaragan, of which none are on the State Register of Heritage Places.
