= Department of Primary Industries and Regional Development =

Department of Primary Industries and Regional Development may refer to:

- Department of Primary Industries and Regional Development (New South Wales)
- Department of Primary Industries and Regional Development (Western Australia)
