= Jurien Bay Marine Park =

Protected area in Western Australia

- IUCN category Ia (strict nature reserve)
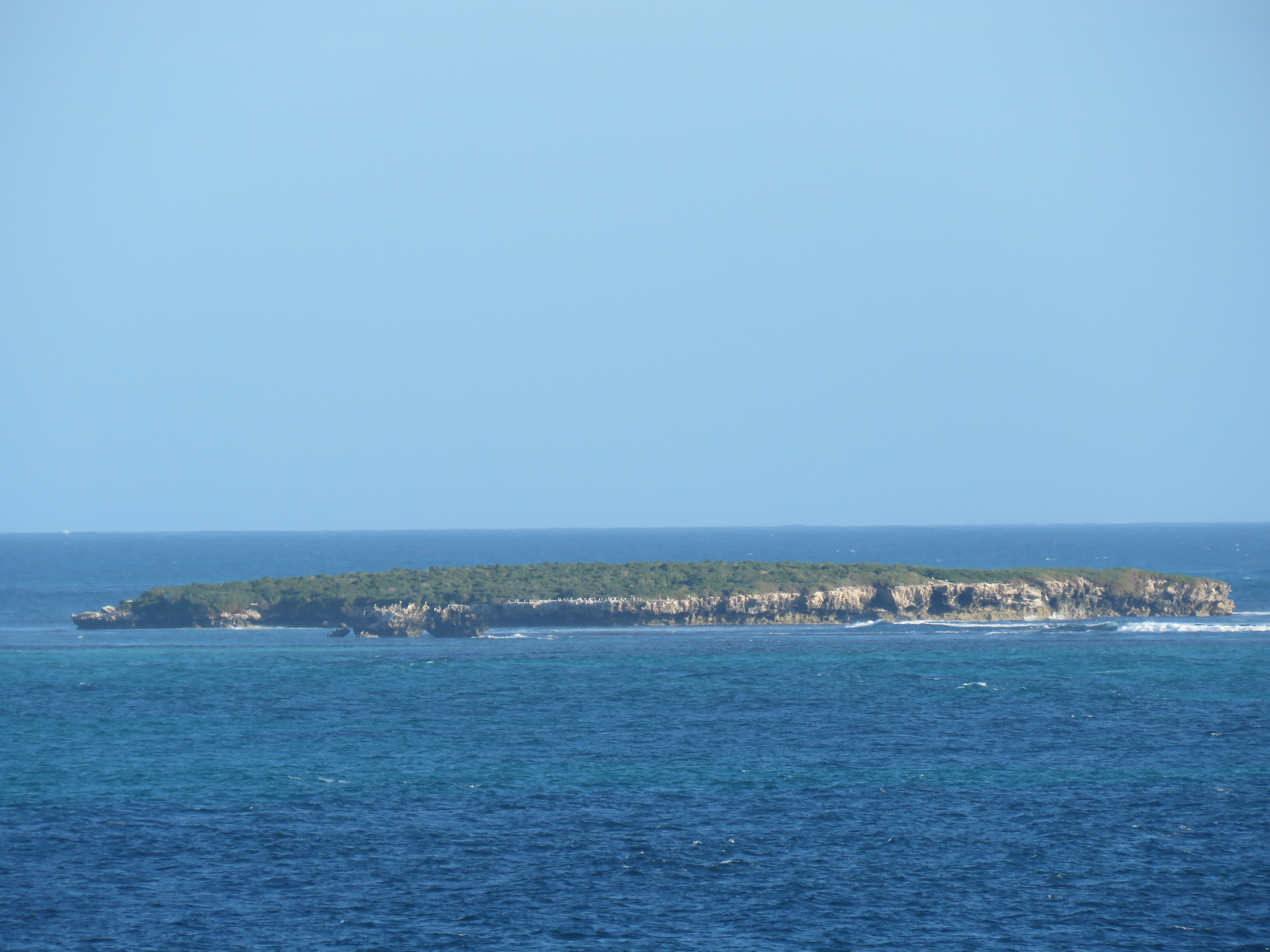
- Sandland Island, part of Jurien Bay Marine Park

- Location within Western Australia
- Location: Western Australia
- Nearest city: Green Head
- Coordinates: 30°22′S 114°58′E
- Area: 823.75 km^{2} (318.05 sq mi)
- Established: 31 August 2003
- Governing body: Department of Environment and Conservation; Department of Fisheries
- Website: Official website

The Jurien Bay Marine Park is a protected marine park that is located 200 to 300 kilometres (120 to 190 mi) north of Perth, off the coastal tip of the Wheatbelt region of Western Australia. The 82,375-hectare (203,550-acre) marine park was formally declared on 31 August 2003 and is situated along the Indian Ocean Drive that extends south from Green Head to the southern boundary of Nambung National Park. It includes many of the islands located in this region.

Additionally, there is also a separate but adjoining Jurien Marine Park in Australian Commonwealth waters, which was declared on 17 November 2012 with a size of 185,090 hectares (457,400 acres), located to the west of Jurien Bay Marine Park.

== Features ==
The park name derives from French naval administrator Charles-Marie Jurien de la Gravière. The park's management plans were considered for some years before declaration.

Approximately 12 per cent of Western Australian waters are currently included in marine parks and reserves, and about 2.4 per cent of state waters are in sanctuary (that is, 'no take') zones. A small part of the Jurien Bay Marine Park has been allocated as a sanctuary and is subject to fisheries regulations.

Western Australia’s marine areas are among the least disturbed in the world rich in biodiversity as the coast has two overlapping biogeographic regions, the tropical north (north of Ningaloo Marine Park) and the temperate south (east of Cape Leeuwin) so both tropical and temperate species occur here. Along the eastern boundary of the Indian Ocean the Leeuwin Current carries warm water along this coast from the equator to the southern coast.

== Flora and fauna ==
The park includes sea lion and seabird breeding areas along with temperate reefs populated by the temperate and tropical plants and animals supported by the warm Leeuwin current. In the extensive seagrass meadows western rock lobsters serve as nursery areas. Whales migrate each year along the western coast of Australia, and visitors can see the incredible variety of marine life found in the waters off Jurien Bay's coast as well as having the opportunity to interact with seals, sea lions and dolphins through swimming, snorkelling, scuba diving, fishing, and exploring the offshore reefs and islands.

The Jurien Bay Marine Park is administered by the Marine Parks and Reserves Authority and managed by the Department of Environment and Conservation in partnership with the local community. The Department of Fisheries continues to manage commercial and recreational fishing and aquaculture in the marine park in close cooperation with the Department of Environment and Conservation. The town of Jurien Bay boasts a modern boat harbour, which has become the focus for the expanding aquaculture industry.

== See also ==
- Integrated Marine and Coastal Regionalisation of Australia
- Protected areas of Western Australia
