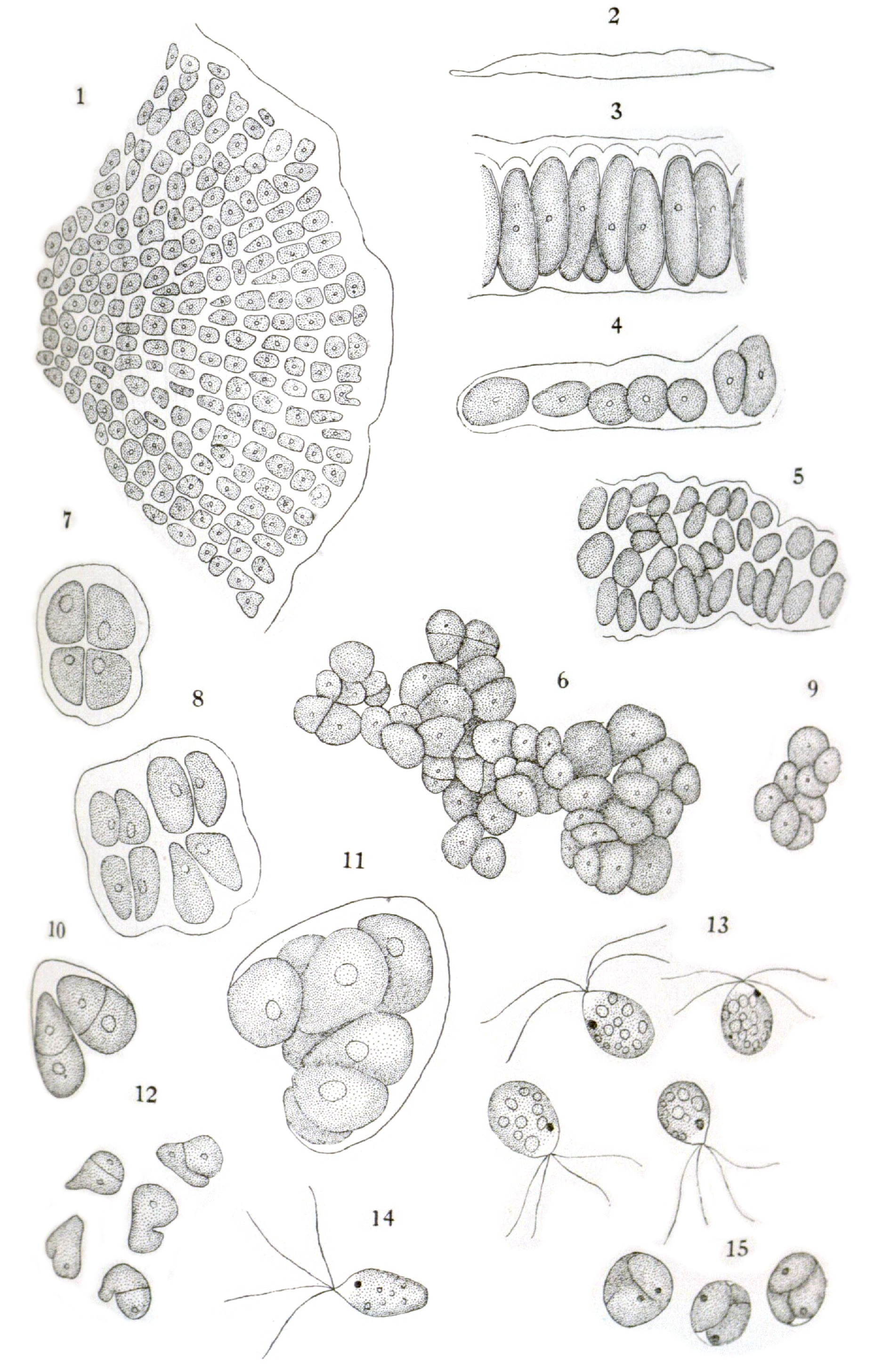
- Pseudulvella americana

Scientific classification
- Kingdom: Plantae
- Division: Chlorophyta
- Class: Chlorophyceae
- Order: Chaetopeltidales
- Family: Chaetopeltidaceae
- Genus: Pseudulvella; Wille, 1909

Species
- Pseudulvella americana; Pseudulvella applanata; Pseudulvella consociata; Pseudulvella prostrata

= Pseudulvella =

Genus of algae

Pseudulvella is a genus of green algae, in the family Chaetopeltidaceae. It is an epiphyte, found in freshwater or marine habitats.

Pseudulvella consists of filaments of cells that radiate outwards to form a disk. Cells are uninucleate, with a chloroplast containing a pyrenoid. Asexual reproduction is by quadriflagellate zoospores.

The species Pseudulvella americana is closely related to Chaetopeltis and morphologically similar, but lacks pseudocilia.
