= Tetrasporales =

Historically recognized order of algae

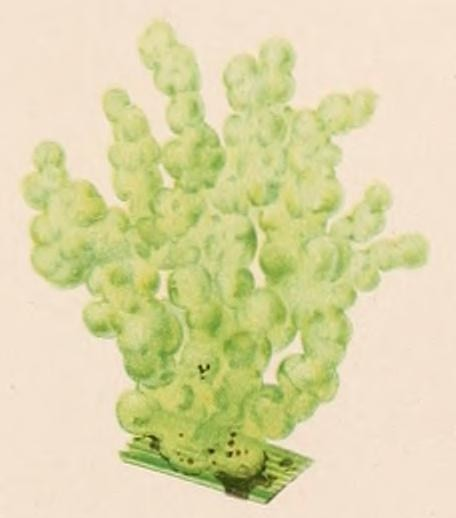
Illustration of Tetraspora gelatinosa

The Tetrasporales are a formerly recognized order of green algae, specifically the Chlorophyceae, now included in Chlamydomonadales. AlgaeBase places Tetraspora and Tetrasporaceae in Chlamydomonadales.
