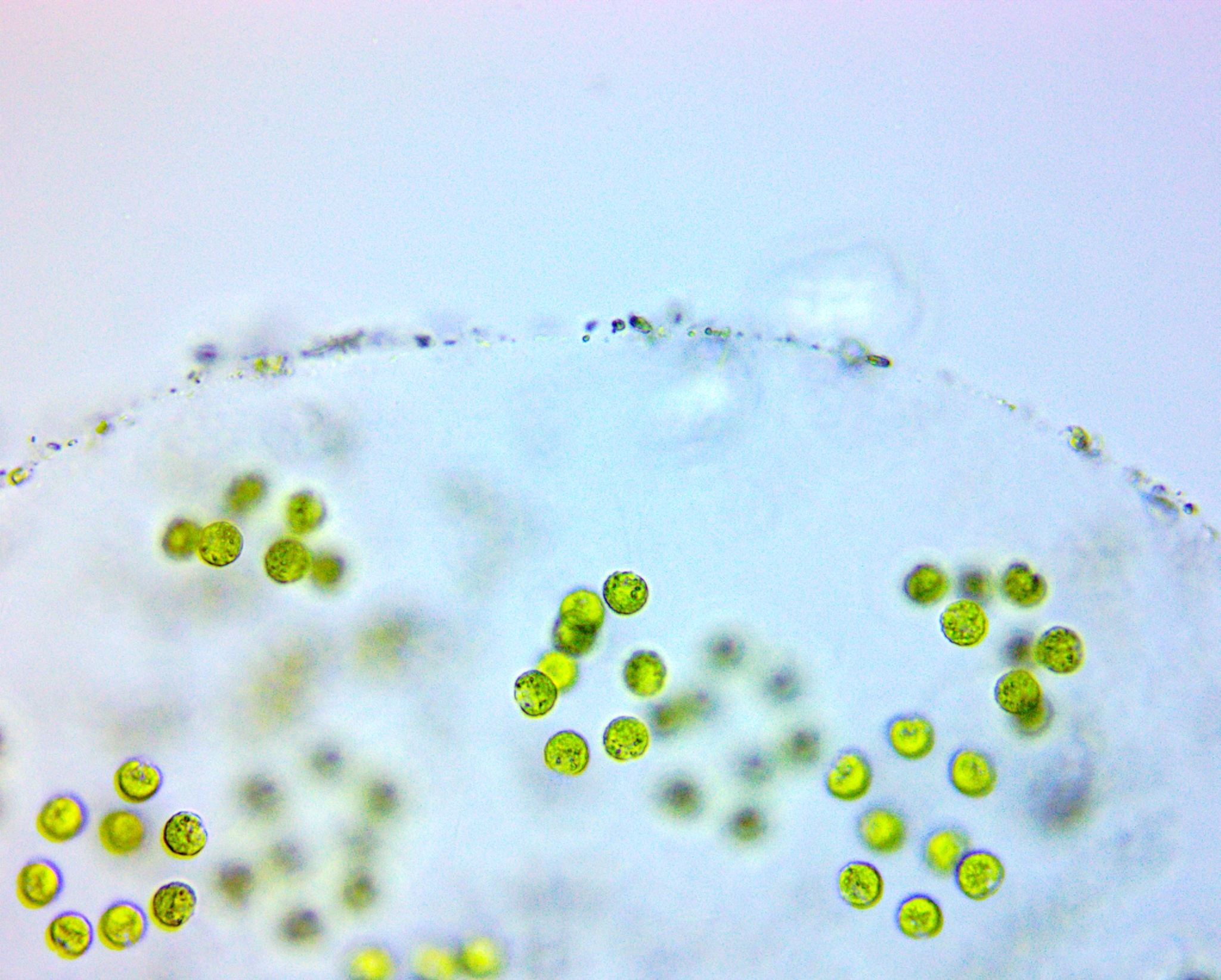
- Paulschulzia pseudovolvox

Scientific classification
- Kingdom: Plantae
- Division: Chlorophyta
- Class: Chlorophyceae
- Order: Chlamydomonadales
- Family: Tetrasporaceae; Wittrock

Genera
- See text.

= Tetrasporaceae =

Family of algae

The Tetrasporaceae are a family of green algae, specifically of the Chlamydomonadales. They are found in freshwater habitats.

Algae in the Tetrasporaceae are distinguished by having two or more pseudocilia per cell, which are described as "rigid cytoplasmic processes" that project outwards. Cells are borne in microscopic or macroscopic colonies, and these colonies typically consist of a gelatinous matrix in which the cells are embedded near the periphery, typically in twos, fours, or eights.

Colonies may grow when their cells divide into two, four, or eight new cells. Asexual reproduction occurs by the formation of zoospores.

== Genera ==
As of February 2022, AlgaeBase accepted the following genera:

- Apiocystis Nägeli – 4 species
- Askenasyella Schmidle – 6 species
- Chlorangiochaete Korshikov – 1 species
- Chlorokremys Wujek & R.H.Thompson – 1 species
- Fottiella Ettl – 2 species
- Gemellicystis Teiling – 1 species
- Octosporiella Kugrens – 1 species
- Paulschulzia Skuja – 3 species
- Phacomyxa Skuja – 2 species
- Placosphaera P.A.Dangeard – 2 species
- Polychaetochloris Pascher – 1 species
- Porochloris Pascher – 3 species
- Tetraspora Link ex Desvaux – 22 species

Formerly, other genera such as Schizochlamys and Chaetopeltis have been included within this family, but are now placed in their own families: Schizochlamydaceae and Chaetopeltidaceae, respectively.
