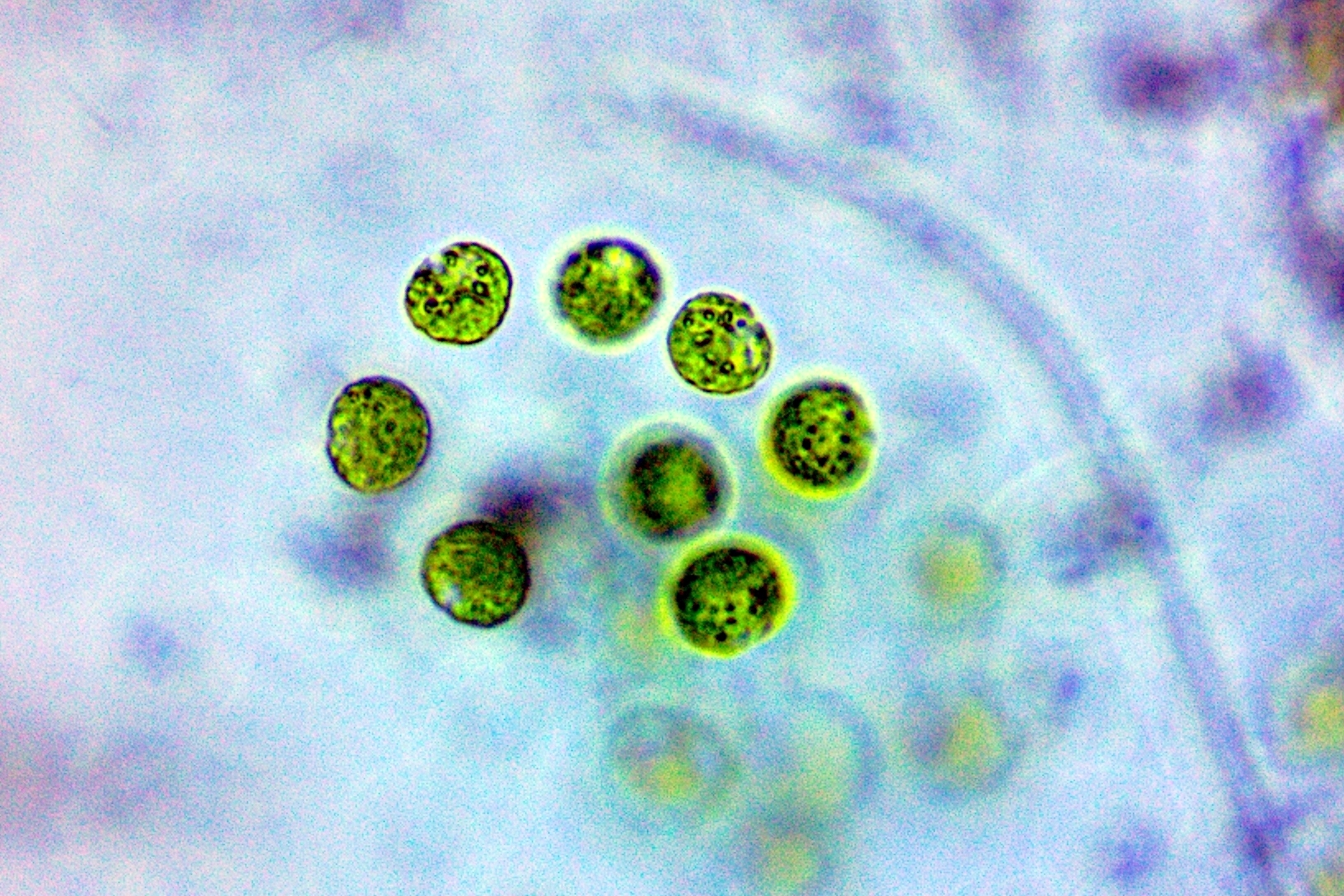
- Paulschulzia pseudovolvox

Scientific classification
- Clade: Viridiplantae
- Division: Chlorophyta
- Class: Chlorophyceae
- Order: Chlamydomonadales
- Family: Tetrasporaceae
- Genus: Paulschulzia; Skuja

Type species
- Paulschulzia pseudovolvox (P.Schulz) Skuja

Species
- See text

= Paulschulzia =

Genus of algae

Paulschulzia is a genus of green algae, specifically of the family Tetrasporaceae.

The genus was circumscribed by Heinrich Leonhards Skuja in Symb. Bot. Upsal. vol.9 (3) on page 118 in 1948.

The genus name of Paulschulzia is in honour of Paul Schulz(-Danzig) (x – 1935), who was a German naturalist (Phycology and Palaeontology), teacher in Danzig.

Paulschulzia consists of spherical to ellipsoidal colonies with usually 4 to 64 cells (sometimes more) embedded in a mucilaginous matrix; within the matrix there are subgroups of 4, 8, or 16 cells each with their own mucilage layer. Cells are spherical to ovoid, and sometimes with two long pseudoflagella extending out of the outer mucilage layer. Cells contain one nucleus and one cup-shaped or stellate chloroplast with a single pyrenoid. Asexual reproduction occurs by the fragmentation of colonies, or by biflagellate zoospores.

Paulschulzia is similar to and closely related to the genus Tetraspora, with both consisting of colonies of cells embedded in an amorphous, mucilaginous matrix. Paulschulzia having subgroups of cells surrounded by their own mucilage layer. However, the two genera separately do not form monophyletic groups.

== Species ==
As accepted by WoRMS;

- Paulschulzia indica M.O.P.Iyengar, 1960
- Paulschulzia pseudovolvox (P.Schultz) Skuja, 1948
- Paulschulzia tenera (Korshikov) J.W.G.Lund, 1961
