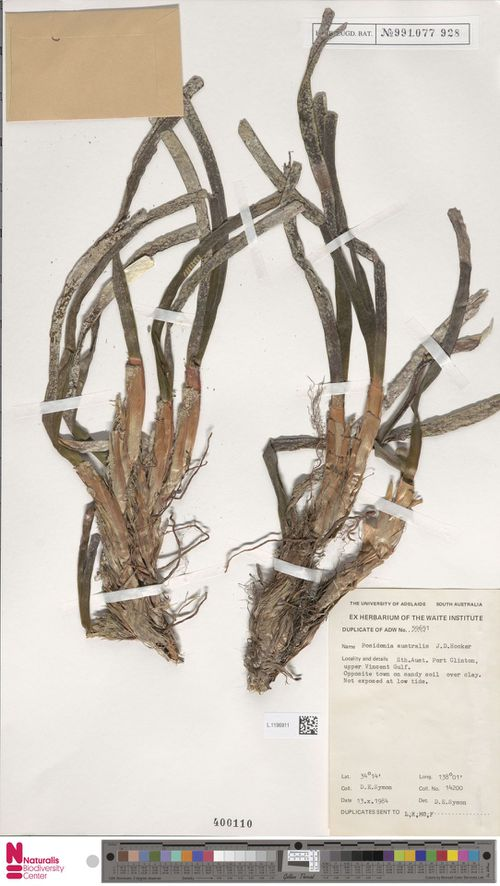

Conservation status
- Near Threatened (IUCN 3.1)

Scientific classification
- Kingdom: Plantae
- Clade: Tracheophytes
- Clade: Angiosperms
- Clade: Monocots
- Order: Alismatales
- Family: Posidoniaceae
- Genus: Posidonia
- Species: P. australis

Binomial name
- Posidonia australis Hook.f.

= Posidonia australis =

Species of plant

Posidonia australis, also known as strapweed, tapeweed, ribbonweed or fibre-ball weed, is a species of seagrass that occurs in the southern coastal waters of Australia. It grows subtidally to a depth of 15 m (49 ft), forming large meadows important to environmental conservation. Balls of resistant fibre from decomposing detritus from the foliage are found along nearby shore-lines.

In 2022, a single stand in Shark Bay was reported by scientists to be the largest plant in the world, extending around 180 km (110 miles) and covering an area of about 200 km^{2} (49,000 acres) of seafloor.

== Description ==
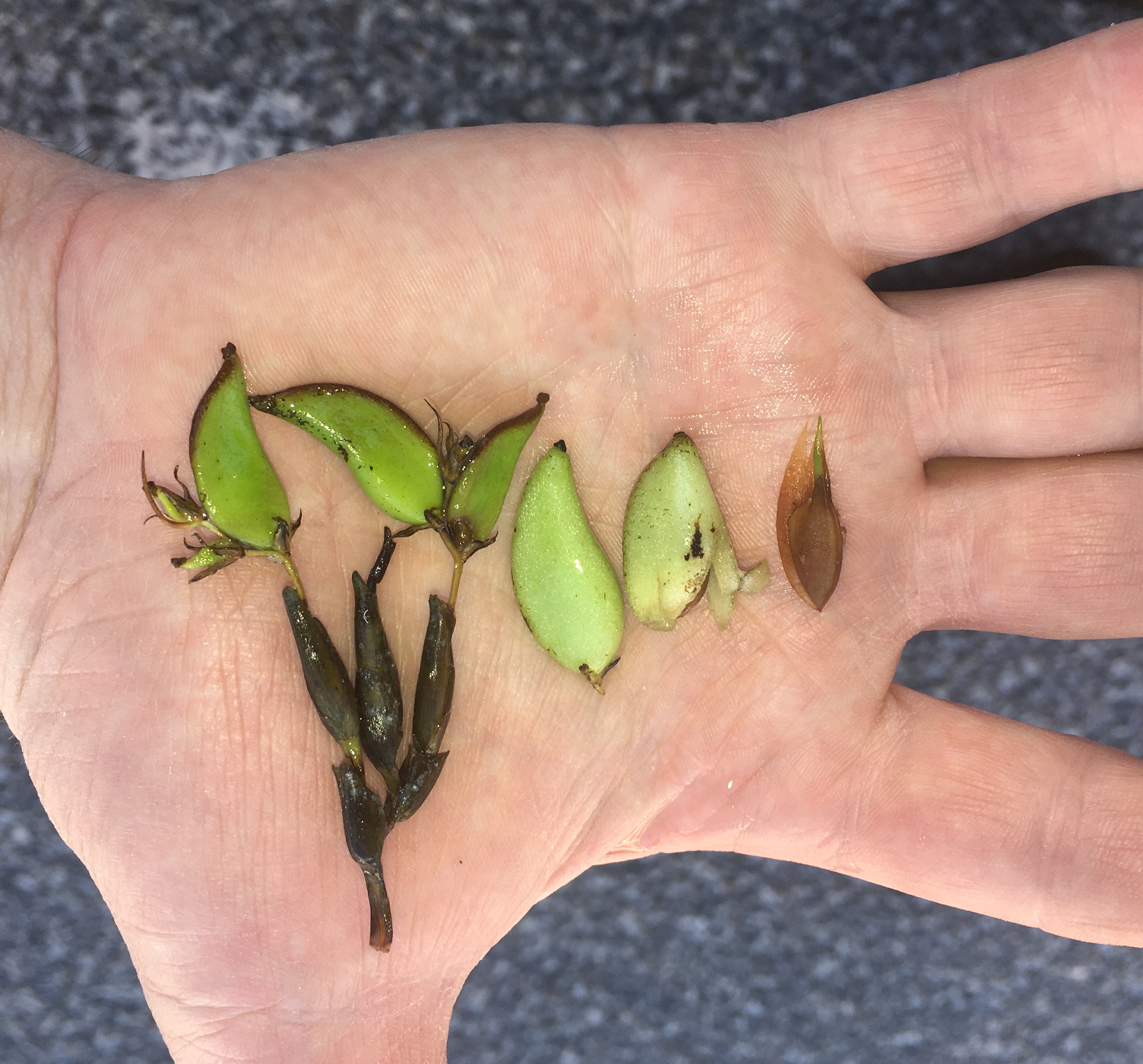
From left: immature fruits attached to plant, mature fruit released from plant, splitting fruit ready to release seed.

Posidonia australis is a flowering plant occurring in dense meadows, or along channels, in white sand. It is found at depths from 1–15 m (3–49 ft). Subsurface rhizomes and roots provide stability in the sands it occupies. Erect rhizomes and leaves reduce the accumulation of silt.

The leaves are ribbon-like and 11–20 mm (0.43–0.79 in) wide. They are bright green, perhaps becoming browned with age. The terminus of the leaf is rounded or absent through damage. They are arranged in groups with older leaves on the outside, longer and different in form from the younger leaves they surround.

The species is monoecious. The flowers appear on small spikes on leafless stems, two bracts on each spike. The plant pollinates by hydrophily, by dispersing in the water.

Posidonia australis reproduction usually occurs through sexual or asexual methods but, under extreme conditions, by pseudovivipary.

A 2013 study showed that P. australis can sequester carbon 35 times more efficiently than rainforests.

In 2022, a study by the School of Biological Sciences and Oceans Institute at The University of Western Australia showed that a single plant of this species can grow vegetatively by using rhizomes to cover an extensive area, similar to buffalo grass. This particular specimen has double the number of chromosomes of other studied populations (40 chromosomes instead of the usual 20).

This species has been known to form sea balls.

== Distribution ==
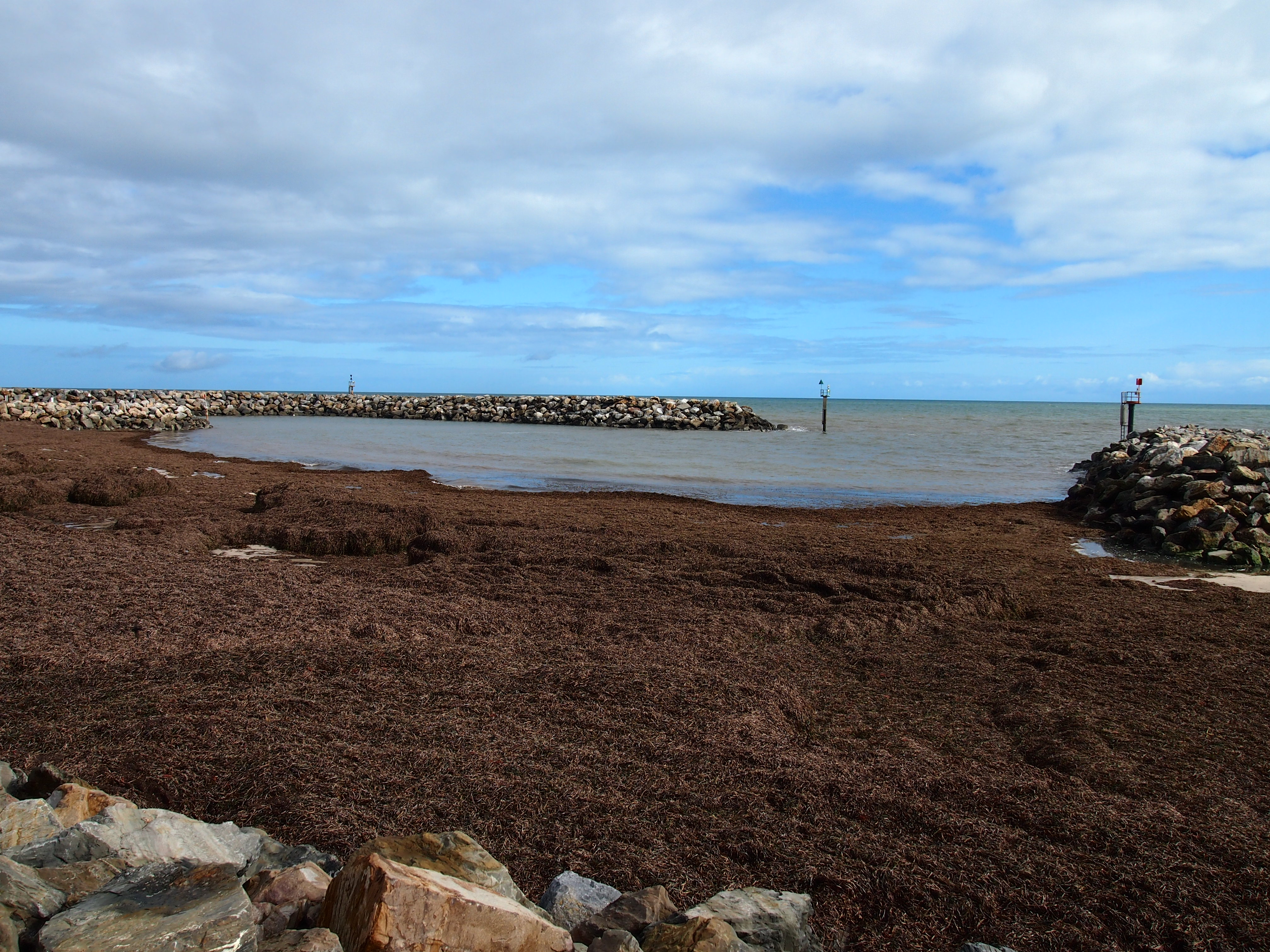
Detrital P. australis accumulation at West Beach, South Australia

This species is found in waters around the southern coast of Australia. In Western Australia it occurs in the Shark Bay region, around islands of the Houtman Abrolhos, and southward along the coast of the Swan Coastal Plain. The species is recorded at the edge of the Esperance Plains, the Archipelago of the Recherche, at the southern coast of the southwest region. The range extends to the east to coastal areas of New South Wales, South Australia, Tasmania, and Victoria.

A sign of a nearby occurrence of Posidonia is the presence of masses of decomposing leaves on beaches, forming fibrous balls.

== Largest known organism ==
A research article in the Proceedings of the Royal Society reported in June 2022 that genetic testing had revealed that samples of Posidonia australis taken from a meadow in Shark Bay up to 180 km (110 miles) apart were all from a single clone of the same plant. The plant covers an area of seafloor of around 200 km^{2} (49,000 acres). This would make it the largest known organism in the world by area, exceeding the size of a colony of the Armillaria ostoyae fungus in Malheur National Forest, Oregon that extends 9.1 km^{2} (2,000 acres), as well as a stand of quaking aspen trees in Utah that extends over more than 40 ha (100 acres).

The plant is estimated to have taken at least 4,500 years to grow to this size by using rhizomes to colonise new parts of the seafloor, assuming a rhizome growth rate of around 35 cm (14 in) a year. This age puts it among the oldest known clonal plants too.

== Taxonomy ==
This species is a member of the family Posidoniaceae, one of eight occurring in Australia. The ninth member, Posidonia oceanica, is found in the Mediterranean sea. The genus name for this species, Posidonia, is given for the god of the seas Poseidon, and australis refers to the southern distribution.

The species was first described by Joseph Hooker in Flora Tasmaniae. Common names for the plant include fibre-ball weed and ribbon weed.

== Conservation status ==
IUCN lists this species as "near threatened", while the meadows in New South Wales have been listed by the Commonwealth of Australia as an endangered ecological community since 2015.
