= Vladimir Arnoldi =

Russian biologist (1871–1924)

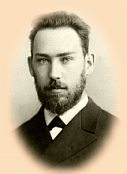
Vladimir Mitrofanovich Arnoldi

Vladimir Mitrofanovich Arnoldi (Russian: Влади́мир Митрофа́нович Арно́льди) (Kozlov (Michurinsk), Russia (1871–1924)) was a Russian professor of biology. He was a Corresponding Member of Russian Academy of Sciences and scientifically listed a number of valuable plants in Malaysia.

He lived in the Russian city of Tambov for much of his life. His son Konstantin Arnoldi became a prominent entomologist.

He is honoured in the name of Arnoldiella, which is a genus of green algae in the family Pithophoraceae.
