= Floydiella =

Scientific classification
- Kingdom: Plantae
- Division: Chlorophyta
- Class: Chlorophyceae
- Order: Chaetopeltidales
- Family: Chaetopeltidaceae
- Genus: Floydiella; Friedl & O'Kelly, 2002

Type species
- Floydiella terrestris (R.D.Groover & A.M.Hofstetter) Friedl & O'Kelly, 2002

Species
- Floydiella terrestris

Genus of algae

Floydiella is a genus of green algae in the family Chaetopeltidaceae.

The genus name of Floydiella is in honour of Gary L. Floyd (b.1940), an American botanist and Professor of Botany at Columbus State Community College.

The genus was circumscribed by Thomas Friedl and Charles J. O'Kelly in Eur. J. Phycol. Vol.37 on page 382 in 2002.
