= Basicladia =

Scientific classification
- Kingdom: Plantae
- Division: Chlorophyta
- Class: Ulvophyceae
- Order: Cladophorales
- Family: Pithophoraceae
- Genus: Basicladia; W.E.Hoffmann & Tilden

Species
- Basicladia okamurae; Basicladia ramulosa

Genus of algae

Basicladia is a genus of green algae in the family Pithophoraceae.

Currently, the type species of Basicladia, B. crassa, is considered a synonym of Arnoldiella crassa; therefore, the genus is synonymous with Arnoldiella. However, there are two species, Basicladia okamurae and Basicladia ramulsosa that are not phylogenetically related to Arnoldiella. No taxonomic combinations have been made.
