= Hormotilopsis =

Scientific classification
- Kingdom: Plantae
- Division: Chlorophyta
- Class: Chlorophyceae
- Order: Chaetopeltidales
- Family: Chaetopeltidaceae
- Genus: Hormotilopsis; Trainor & Bold

Species
- Hormotilopsis gelatinosa; Hormotilopsis tetravacuolaris

Genus of algae

Hormotilopsis is a genus of green algae in the family Chaetopeltidaceae.
