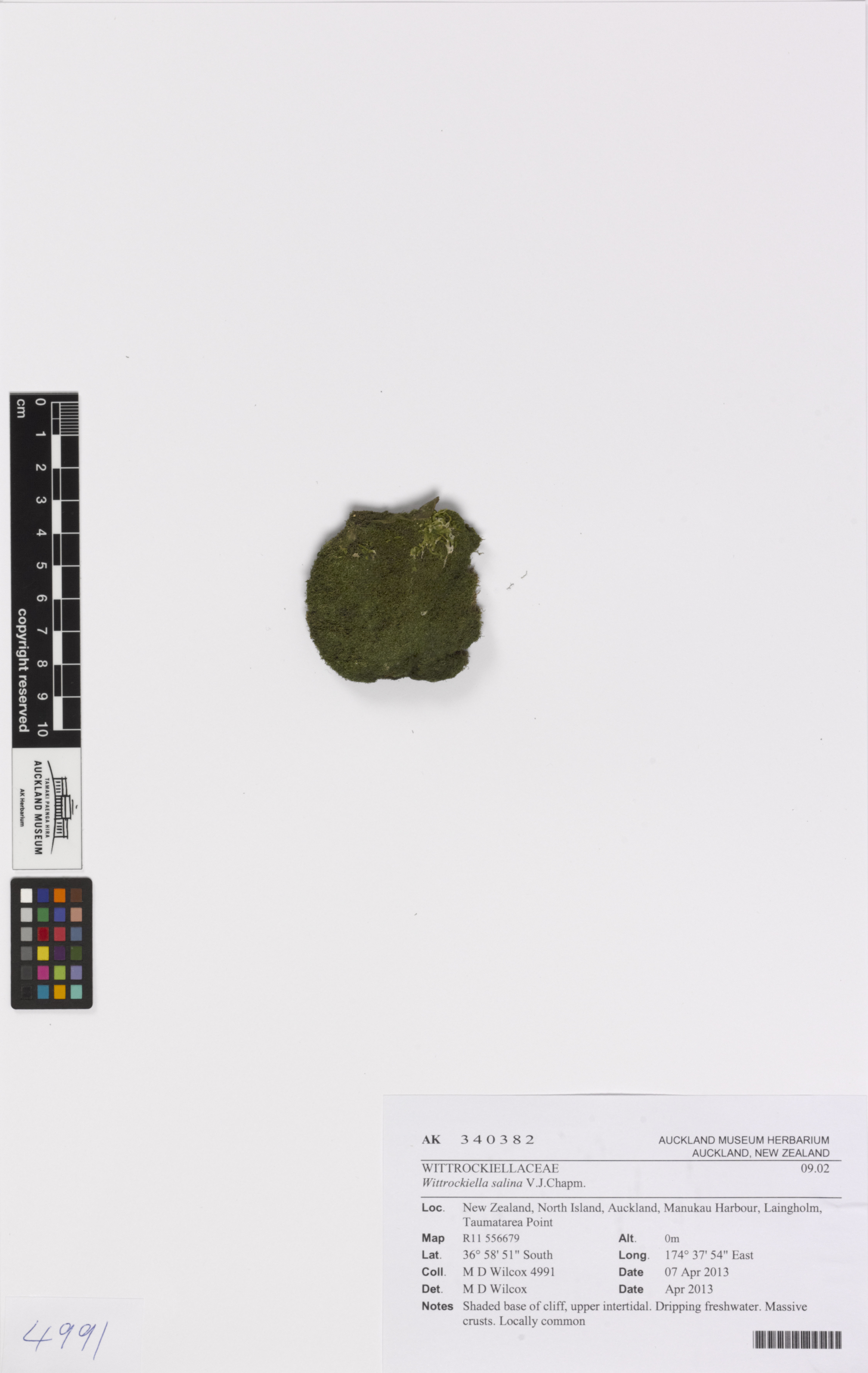
- Herbarium specimen of Wittrockiella salina.

Scientific classification
- Kingdom: Plantae
- Division: Chlorophyta
- Class: Ulvophyceae
- Order: Cladophorales
- Family: Pithophoraceae
- Genus: Wittrockiella; Wille

Species
- Wittrockiella lyallii; Wittrockiella paradoxa

= Wittrockiella =

Genus of algae

Wittrockiella is a genus of green algae in the family Pithophoraceae. This genus was first described by Nordal Wille in 1909. The genus name is for Veit Brecher Wittrock, a Swedish botanist (1839–1914).

Wittrockiella consists of thalli that are heterotrichous, i.e. with two forms of filaments: a branched, uniseriate network of prostrate filaments which give rise to a mass of upright, erect filaments. Cells of the prostrate filaments are irregular while the cells of the upright filaments are nearly cylindrical; apical cells of upright filaments are more densely pigmented. Filaments range from 10 to 750 μm in diameter.

Wittrockiella reproduces via unspecialized cells which develop into aplanosporangia, zoosporangia or gametangia which produce aplanospores, zoospores or gametes respectively.

Wittrockiella predominantly grows in brackish waters with low or fluctuating salinity, such as saltmarshes or mangrove forests, but has also been reported from waterfalls and moist soil surfaces. One species has been reported as an endophyte within the leaves of seagrass (Zostera).

== Species ==
Species in this genus include:

- Wittrockiella amphibia
- Wittrockiella australis
- Wittrockiella calcicola
- Wittrockiella fritschii
- Wittrockiella lyallii
- Wittrockiella salina
- Wittrockiella sundarbanensis
- Wittrockiella zosterae
