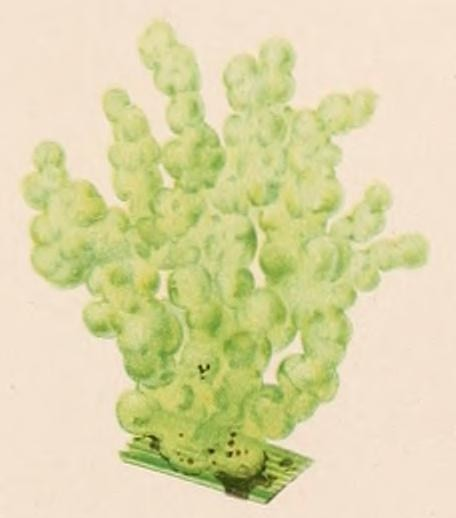

Scientific classification
- Clade: Viridiplantae
- Division: Chlorophyta
- Class: Chlorophyceae
- Order: Chlamydomonadales
- Family: Tetrasporaceae
- Genus: Tetraspora
- Species: T. gelatinosa

Binomial name
- Tetraspora gelatinosa (Vaucher) Desvaux

= Tetraspora gelatinosa =

Species of algae

Tetraspora gelatinosa is a species of green algae. It is a cosmopolitan species found in freshwater.

== Taxonomy ==
T. gelatinosa was first described by Swiss botanist Jean Pierre Étienne Vaucher in 1803 as Ulva gelatinosa. It was changed to the genus Tetraspora in 1818 by French botanist Nicaise Auguste Desvaux. T. gelatinosa is the type species (lectotpye) of the genus.

T. gelatinosa also has two heterotypic synonyms: Tetraspora ulvacea Kützing 1843 and Tetraspora explanata C.Agardh 1827.

== Distribution ==
T. gelatinosa is a cosmopolitan species and it has been reported on all continents, except Antarctica. It is the most commonly reported Tetraspora species in the British Isles. As of 2024, it has only been reported in Nigeria in the African continent. It has also been reported in southern parts of Australia and New Zealand. It is found in eastern North America, both in Canada and the United States.
