= Dermatophyton =

Scientific classification
- Kingdom: Plantae
- Division: Chlorophyta
- Class: Ulvophyceae
- Order: Cladophorales
- Family: Pithophoraceae
- Genus: Dermatophyton; A. Peter, 1886

Type species
- Dermatophyton radians A. Peter, 1886

Species
- Dermatophyton radians

Genus of algae

Dermatophyton is a genus of green algae in the family Pithophoraceae.
