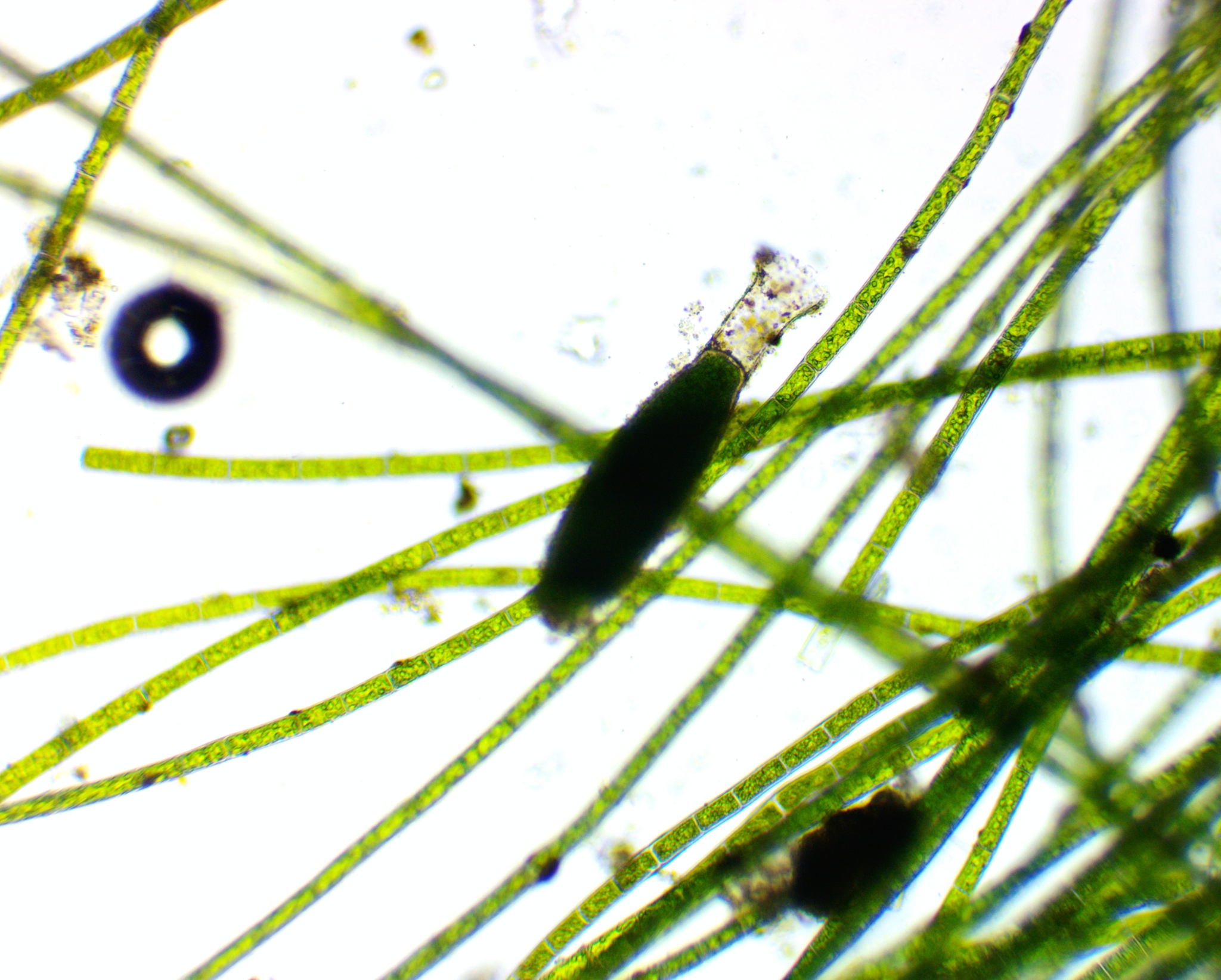
- Pithophora roettleri

Scientific classification
- Kingdom: Plantae
- Division: Chlorophyta
- Class: Ulvophyceae
- Order: Cladophorales
- Family: Pithophoraceae
- Genus: Pithophora; Wittrock

Species
- Pithophora roettleri

= Pithophora =

Genus of algae

Pithophora is a genus of green algae in the family Pithophoraceae. Molecular evidence suggests it contains a single species, Pithophora roettleri. AlgaeBase accepts another species, Pithophora inaequalis.

Pithophora grows as a mass of floating, branched filaments. It grows in stagnant, warm-temperate or tropical fresh water, but also has been reported from moist soil. Cells are long, cylindrical, with a diameter of up to 200 μm and typically 5–20 times as long as wide. Terminal cells are conical, or can produce secondary rhizoids which are curved and attach to a surface like a tendril. Pithophora is easily identified in reproductive condition due to its akinetes, which are single and intercalary or terminal. Akinetes are swollen, with dark cell contents. Akinetes germinate and develop into new branches.

This kind of filamentous algae has a coarse texture to it hence often referred to as "horse hair".
