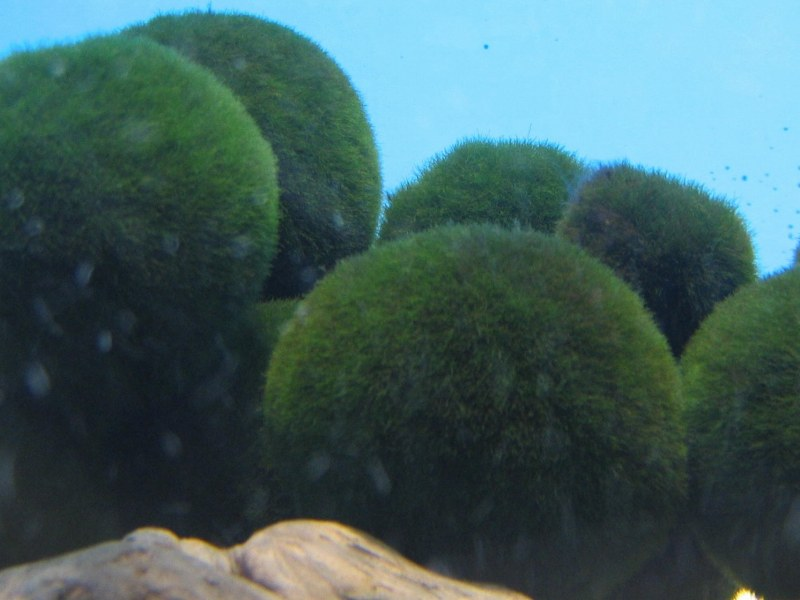
- Aegagropila linnaei in Lake Akan in Japan

Scientific classification
- Kingdom: Plantae
- Division: Chlorophyta
- Class: Ulvophyceae
- Order: Cladophorales
- Family: Pithophoraceae
- Genus: Aegagropila; Kützing

Type species
- Aegagropila brownii (Dillwyn) Kützing

Species
- Aegagropila brownii; Aegagropila globulus; Aegagropila kannoi; Aegagropila leprieurii; Aegagropila montagneana; Aegagropila montagnei

= Aegagropila =

Genus of algae

Aegagropila is a genus of green algae in the family Pithophoraceae. It is found in freshwater habitats in across the Northern Hemisphere.

Aegagropila consists of densely branched, uniseriate filaments, forming spherical aggregates, solid or hollow balls, or tufts and cushions attached to a substrate. Branches grow off the side (laterally) or just below the tip of the cell (subterminally); older cells may produce a second or third branch. Older cells are often irregularly club-shaped, with many branches. Basal poles of cells may produce rhizoids that can attach to other filaments. Each chloroplast has many pyrenoids.

Aegagropila is morphologically similar to, and sometimes indistinguishable from the genus Aegagropilopsis.

This genus has been described as a type of sea ball.
