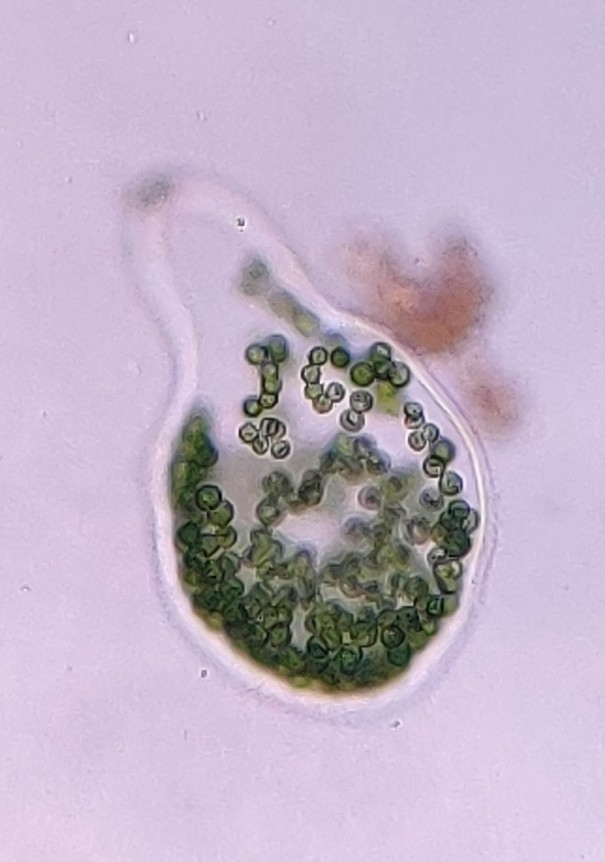
- Apiocystis brauniana

Scientific classification
- Clade: Viridiplantae
- Division: Chlorophyta
- Class: Chlorophyceae
- Order: Chlamydomonadales
- Family: Tetrasporaceae
- Genus: Apiocystis; Nägeli, 1849

Type species
- Apiocystis brauniana Nägeli

= Apiocystis =

Genus of algae

Apiocystis is a genus of algae belonging to the family Tetrasporaceae. It is found attached to freshwater aquatic algae or plants. The species of this genus are found in Europe and Northern America, and are widespread but generally uncommon.

Species:

- Apiocystis brauniana Nägeli
- Apiocystis lacustris W.R.Taylor

Apiocystis forms microscopic colonies of cells. Colonies are pear-shaped or bulbous, attached to a substrate, with cells embedded under the surface in a mucilaginous matrix. The cells are spherical and in pairs or fours, with two long pseudoflagella extending out from the mucilage layer. Cells are more or less spherical, 8–11 μm in diameter, with one nucleus, several contractile vacuoles, and a single cup-shaped chloroplast with a pyrenoid and a stigma.

The colony grows when the cells divide to form groups of four. Asexual reproduction occurs by the formation of zoospores (swarmers). Sexual reproduction has also been observed in this genus; isogamous gametes are formed with two flagella each.
