= Sea balls =

Spheres of natural fibre formed in water

A Neptune ball collected from a beach in Corsica

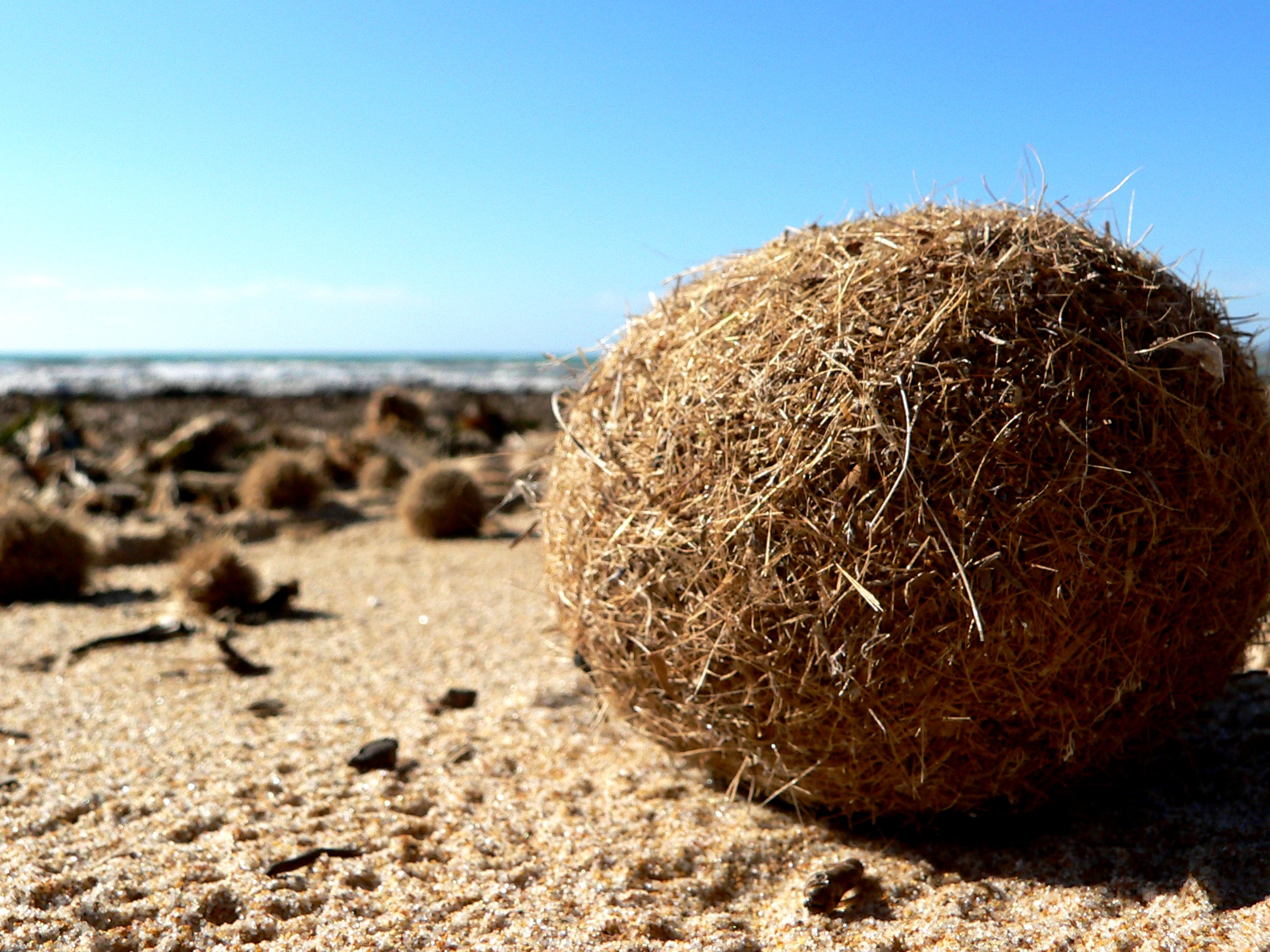
A Neptune ball on a sandy beach; many more lie in the background

Sea balls are a group of aquatic phenomena. They form through the movement of discarded plant debris by water, which rolls fibres into compact spheres. The most well-known examples, found on the coasts of the Mediterranean Sea, are composed of decayed leaf fibres of the seagrass species Posidonia oceanica, and are typically referred to as Neptune balls. Other variants worldwide are made of different organic materials. They usually have a diameter between 22.8 mm (0.90 in) and 53.6 mm (2.11 in). Sea balls are distinct from species of algae that grow in spherical shapes, such as species in the genus Aegagropila.

Neptune balls, particularly the fibres composing them, have been used for millennia for purposes such as shoemaking, medicine, or caulking ships, though the balls' formation process and composition has only been understood since the late 19th century. Modern applications use the properties rare in nature that Neptune balls possess; for example, Neptune balls are a good soundproofing material. Neptune balls could also be a more biodegradable substitute for some synthetic materials.

A study in 2018 and 2019 found that plastic waste, especially microplastics, has been captured in the process of Neptune ball formation; studies and people have found plastic in many Neptune balls in the Mediterranean. Consequently, Neptune balls have been suggested as an indicator of plastic pollution in the sea, which results as of 2026 have shown to be valid.

== Description ==
=== Names and definitions ===
Sea balls formed in the Mediterranean Sea are known by various names. In English, they are referred to as aegagropiles, Neptune balls, égagropiles, egagropili or Posidonia oceanica spheroids. Equivalent vernacular names include pelotes marines or pelotes-de-mer in French, (Note: Meaning 'marine ball of yarn'. Alternative French terms include aegagropiles de mer and aegagropiles marines ('sea aegagropiles').) zeeballen in Dutch, motolini in Italian, and Seebälle in German. (Note: Other German names include Meerballen, Meerbälle, and Meerpillen, all meaning 'sea balls'.) The term aegagropilae derives from the Ancient Greek αἴγαγρος (aígagros, 'wild goat') and πῖλος (pîlos, 'felt, fur'), because the balls resemble hairballs regurgitated by goats. They were known by the Latin terms pilae stagnales, pilae marinae, pili marini, sphaerae marinae, globuli marini, and sphaerae thalassiae. Historical Arabic sources recorded them as أُكَر الْبَحْر (ʾukar al-baḥr or okr elbahr, 'balls of the sea') and النَّبَاتِيّ (an-nabātiyy or annabati, 'the botanical [one]').

Historically, sea balls was used synonymously with Neptune balls and its equivalents, though 20th- and 21st-century literature applies the term more broadly, to Neptune balls, other spheroids of marine material, and fossilised specimens. The German phycologist and botanist Bruno Schröder distinguished between two categories: non-living sea balls, (Note: German: unechte, lit. 'false'.) such as Neptune balls, which are aggregates of detached plant debris rolled together by wave action; and living sea balls, (Note: German: echte, lit. 'true'.) such as those of the algal genus Aegagropila, which develop through radial spherical growth. The Canadian botanist W. F. Ganong similarly distinguished between algal balls and wave-formed plant aggregations.

=== Formation ===
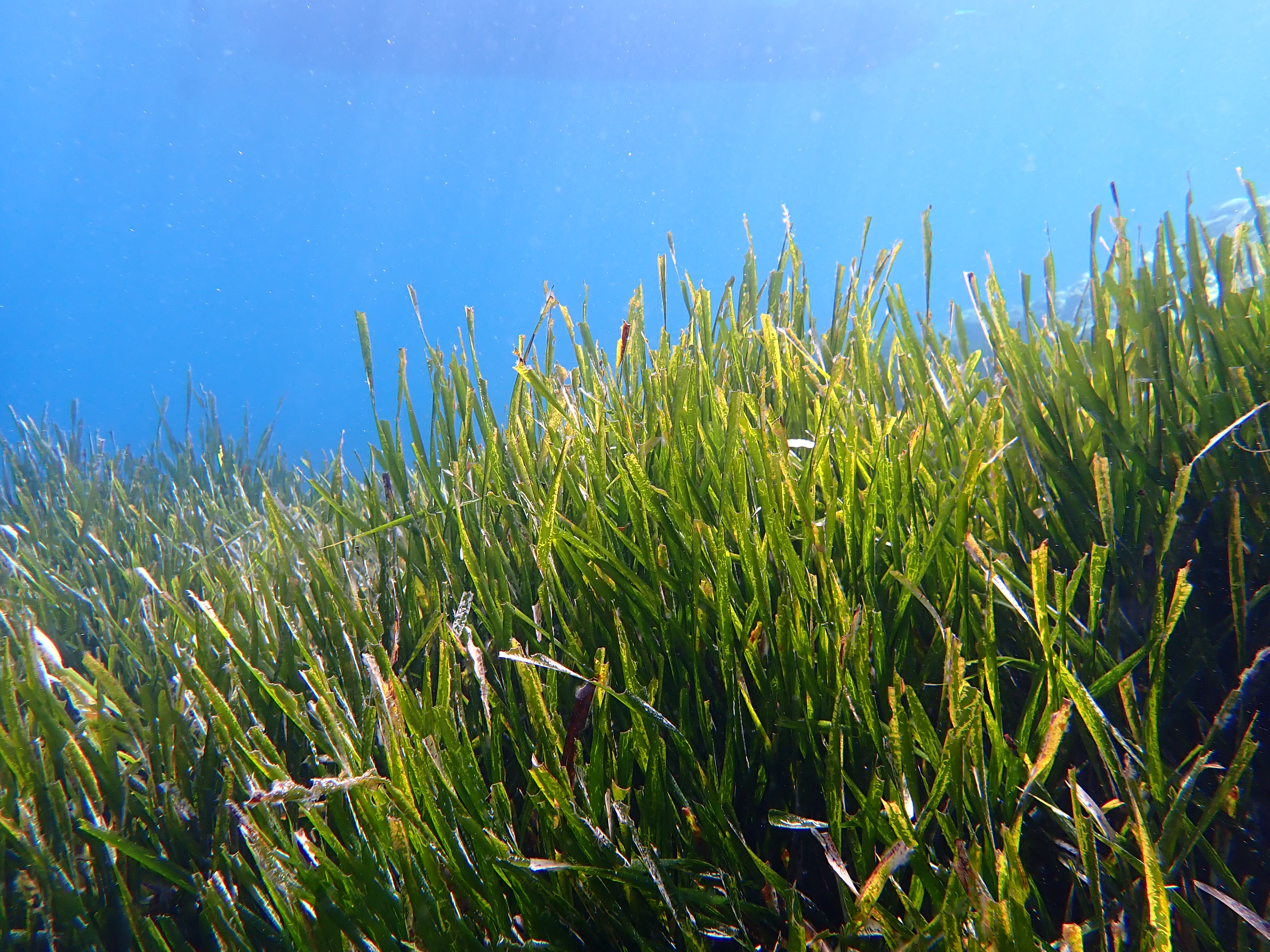
Posidonia oceanica growing on the sea floor

Neptune balls form from the remains of Posidonia oceanica, a seagrass species endemic to the Mediterranean Sea. In autumn, Posidonia oceanica loses its leaves. After the leaves shed, its leaf sheaths are buried by sedimentation in an accumulation of dead rhizomes and roots. The lignin-rich leaf sheaths are eroded as they are buried, leaving fibres behind. The sea rolls the fibres into a spherical shape, creating Neptune balls. (Note: Some Neptune balls have a nucleus, though this is not necessary.) Ocean currents can then dislodge Neptune balls from the sea floor; some drift into deeper waters and some wash ashore. Though where they travel during their relocation is not precisely known, Neptune balls wash up on beaches especially frequently during storms.

=== Appearance, properties, and applications ===
Dry Neptune balls are light brown. Neptune balls are usually less than 160 millimetres (6.3 in) long in diameter; a study found that the mean diameter is between 22.8 mm (0.90 in) and 53.6 mm (2.11 in). (Note: The mean radius varies depending on the axis. The mean length of each axis is 26.8 mm (1.06 in), 14.49 mm (0.570 in), and 11.46 mm (0.451 in), respectively. The geometric standard deviation for each axis is 14.36 mm (0.565 in), 14.7 mm (0.58 in), and 14.58 mm (0.574 in), respectively.) The study also found that the average mass of Neptune balls is 212 mg (3.27 gr). (Note: With a geometric standard deviation of 1.458 g (0.0514 oz).) Another study found that Neptune balls have diameters from 20 millimetres (0.79 in) up to 200 millimetres (7.9 in). Neptune balls can be spherical or ellipsoidal.

Their fibres are relatively smooth, except for places where salt crystals form due to sea water evaporation. Fibres on the outside of Neptune balls often break into a disordered bundle of smaller fibres during their transportation to the shore, though this is unlikely to impact the formation process. Posidonia oceanica's lignin and cell fibres ensure that Neptune balls are stiff; the balls are composed of 32% lignin, whereas Posidonia oceanica is 19% lignin. Neptune balls are also stiff because of their high density.

Neptune balls that wash up on shores are typically considered waste, although they have a variety of uses. Neptune balls have been suggested as a soundproofing material, as they have similar absorption to mineral wool and polyester fibre. Extracted lignin from Neptune balls has been suggested as a material for reinforcement. The poor flammability and good thermal insulation of Neptune balls make them excellent for building insulation; consequently, they have been sold as a building insulation material. Neptune balls would have less of an environmental impact than traditional insulation because Posidonia oceanica absorbs carbon dioxide. They would also replace plastic fibres, which are unsustainable because they require oil extraction. The use of Neptune balls for insulation would also reduce energy use and organic waste. Procuring Neptune balls for insulation uses up to thirty times less energy than procuring mineral wool, rock wool, or petroleum-based foams. However, Anna Sanchez-Vidal, a researcher at the University of Barcelona, argues against removing Neptune balls from beaches because they are part of beach ecosystems. They bring humidity to beaches, protect beaches from erosion, provide nutrients for dune plants, and feed beach arthropods.

== Distribution ==
=== In the Mediterranean Sea ===
Neptune balls formed from Posidonia oceanica can only be found on coasts of the Mediterranean Sea, where Posidonia oceanica is endemic. Posidonia oceanica Neptune balls have been found on the coasts of Spain, Algeria, Tunisia, and Turkey.

=== Worldwide ===
On the east coast of Africa and on the coast of Australia, non-living sea balls made of Posidonia australis have been found. Despite conservation efforts, Posidonia australis is in decline. In 1996 and 2006, non-living sea balls made of marram grass were reported at Dingle Bay in Ireland. These varied in shape; some were spherical and had a radius of 3.5 cm (1.4 in), whereas others were elliptical and over 25 cm (9.8 in) long. Non-living sea balls made of fragments of marsh plant stems, rhizomes, and roots have been reported in Florida, United States. Non-living sea balls have also been found in lakes and on the coast of Nova Scotia, Canada, the coast of New England, United States, and on the coasts of the North Sea. The Canadian botanist W. F. Ganong speculated that non-living sea balls occur "all over the globe".

== History ==
The earliest known use of Neptune balls was in ancient Egypt, where they were used to make footwear. The earliest known dated description of Neptune balls was in 1216 in Andalusia, Spain, where they were known as annabdti. Moorish scholar Abul Abbas mentioned them in his book of travel, Kitab ar-rihlat, as supposedly having medicinal properties. An Arabic pharmacologist, Ibu el Baither, called Neptune balls okr elbahr in his book Kitab al-Dschamie al-Kabir, believing that they had medicinal properties in dentistry. The Encyclopédie, published between 1751 and 1772, defined Neptune balls as "a substance, usually an oblong, rounded or spherical ball shape, [that is] fist-sized". The Encyclopédie stated that Neptune balls are composed of fibrous plant substances. Henry David Thoreau mentioned aquatic spheroids in his 1854 book Walden. Botanists in France have known that Neptune balls are formed from Posidonia oceanica remains since at least 1872, though theories that they are formed from the remains of pinecones existed in the 19th century. In 1877, Hugh Algernon Weddell reported that Neptune balls found on beaches around Hyères, France, are made of Posidonia caulini, another name for Posidonia oceanica. He disproved the theory that Neptune balls are made of algae; they were thus removed from the algae genus Aegagropila.

== Plastic waste and climate ==
From 2018 to 2019, Anna Sanchez-Vidal, a researcher at the University of Barcelona, led a study investigating the role of Neptune balls in trapping marine plastic and carrying it to the shore. The study examined Neptune balls collected on different beaches on Mallorca, Spain. The location was chosen for its extensive underwater meadows of Posidonia oceanica and its large accumulations of plastic waste. The study found that half the samples contained plastic debris, mainly fragments, pellets and foams. The average size of the pieces of plastic was 9.08 mm (0.357 in). The polymers were identified by spectroscopy and included polyethylene (50.57%), polypropylene (32.18%) and polyvinyl chloride (6.90%).

After the paper was published, Sanchez-Vidal received many pictures of Neptune balls filled with plastic. In an interview with the BBC, she said that these examples contained larger plastics like "sanitary towels, tampons, [and] wet wipes". She stated that the Neptune balls return waste "that was never meant to be on the seafloor". However, according to Sanchez-Vidal, Neptune balls are not a solution for plastic waste problems, as removing them to reduce pollution would disrupt the beach ecosystem, and they would not filter out plastic effectively. Neptune balls may collect up to 900 million pieces of plastic from the ocean every year. As of 2021, it is unclear if the plastic damages the seagrass.

A 2024 study by the Spanish Institute of Oceanography found that Neptune balls are an effective indicator for marine plastic pollution on the seafloor, especially for microplastics, which were present in 62% of collected Neptune balls containing plastic. However, the study suggested that more research is needed to ascertain what proportion of plastics in Neptune balls are fibres, in order to assess differences between plastics found on beaches and plastics found on the sea floor. Additionally, the study found that Neptune balls may facilitate the movement of plastic from the seafloor to the surface, which could lead to increased consumption of plastic by sea life. The study concluded that the number of plastic items trapped in Neptune balls is dependent on the number of plastic items in the area rather than the size of the balls.

A 2026 study suggested that Neptune balls offer "promising opportunities for large-scale [plastic pollution] monitoring programs", although the method is still "in an early stage" and "[f]urther research is required" to standardise Neptune balls as an indicator of marine plastic pollution. The study analysed 1300 Neptune balls collected on thirteen beaches of the Latium coast in Italy, and found that more than one-third contained plastic, with microplastics being the most common type of plastic found.

== See also ==
- Tumbleweed
