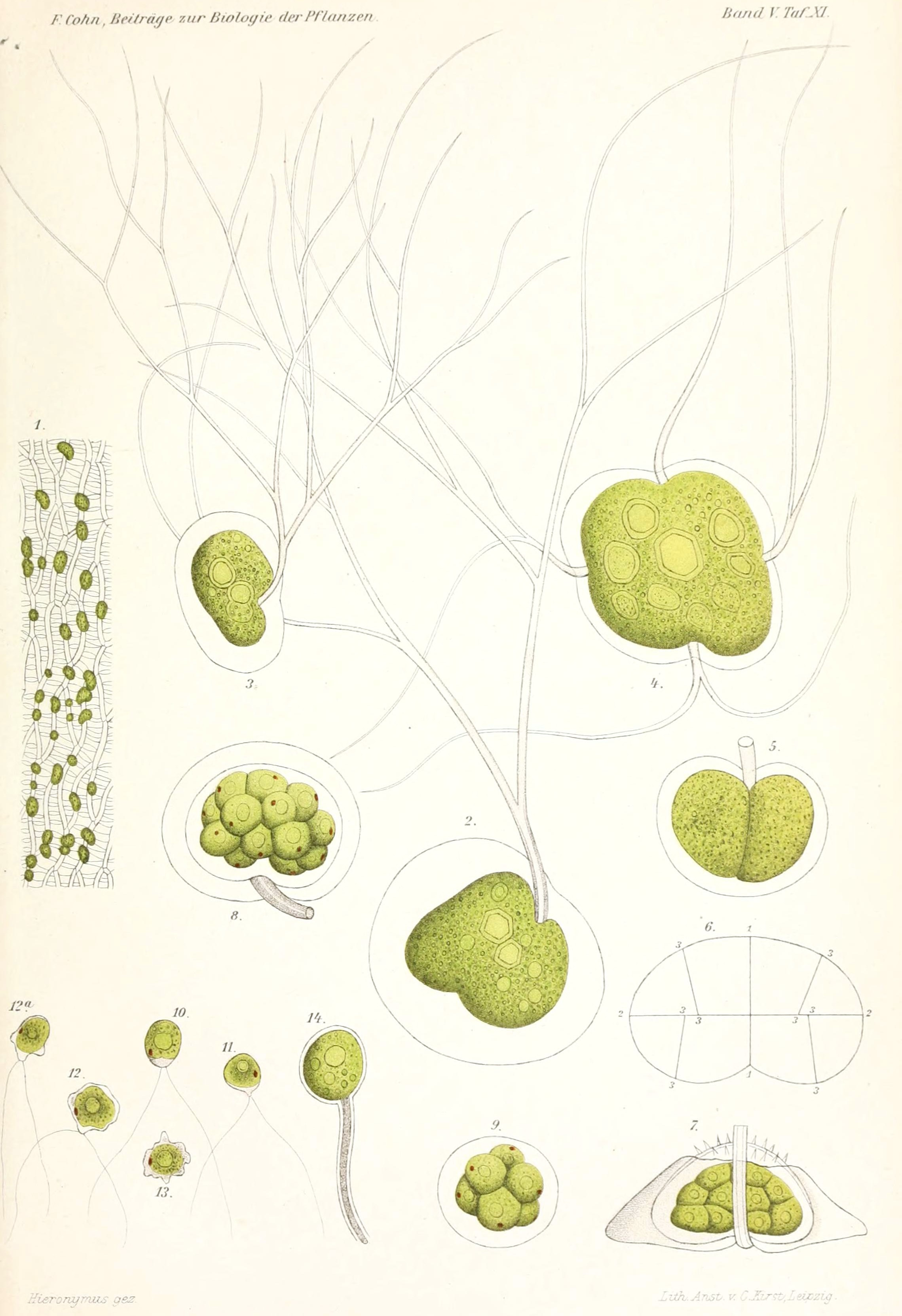
- Dicranochaete reniformis

Scientific classification
- Clade: Viridiplantae
- Division: Chlorophyta
- Class: Chlorophyceae
- Order: Chaetopeltidales
- Family: Dicranochaetaceae; Bourrelly ex P.C.Sillva
- Genus: Dicranochaete; Heironymus, 1887

Type species
- Dicranochaete britannica

Species
- Dicranochaete bohemica; Dicranochaete britannica; Dicranochaete quadriseta; Dicranochaete reniformis; Dicranochaete terrestris; Dicranochaete variabilis

= Dicranochaete =

Genus of algae

Dicranochaete is a genus of green algae in the order Chaetopeltidales. It is the only genus in the family Dicranochaetaceae. It is a rare genus, found as an epiphyte on aquatic plants and algae in freshwater habitats. One species is terrestrial, having been described from the soil of a spruce forest.

Dicranochaete consists of single cells or a few cells clustered together, attached to a substrate. Cells are hemispherical or ellipsoidal in side view. The apical portion of the cells are covered by a hood-like structure, which may be spiny, and has one or more bristles, also termed setae. The seta is hollow and dichotomously branched. Each cell has a cup-shaped, parietal chloroplast with or without pyrenoids. Usually two contractile vacuoles are present in the basal part of the cell. Asexual reproduction occurs by the formation of biflagellate zoospores; sexual reproduction is by biflagellate gametes, which fuse to form a quadriflagellate zygote.

Species are distinguished from each other based on the morphology of the cap-like structure, and the number of bristles. Other morphological characters such as the size and shape of the cells are variable and less reliable for identification.

Dicranochaete typically occurs in acidic, oligotrophic waters such as peat bogs, often those covered with Sphagnum moss. It has evolved several traits that are adaptive to living in these low-nutrient environments, such as the presence of long setae to increase surface area for nutrient absorption, and the presence of a spiny cap for protection.
