= Posidonia australis seagrass meadows of the Manning-Hawkesbury ecoregion =

Australian endangered ecological community

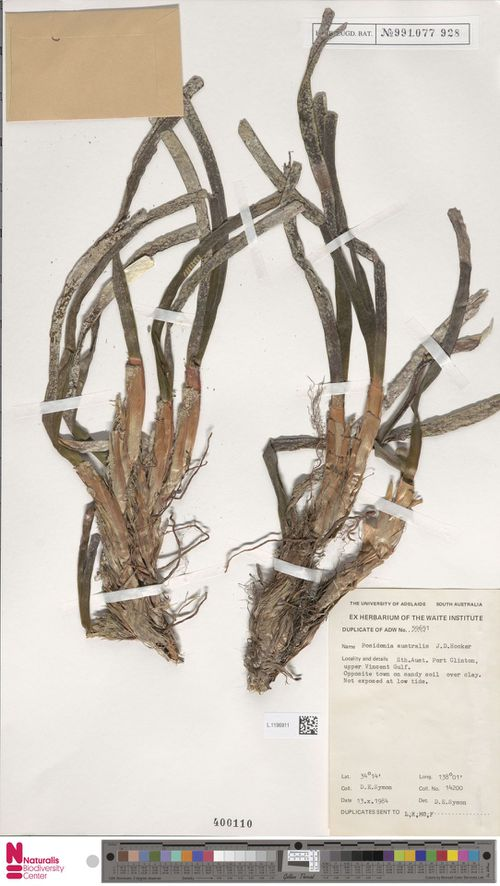
Posidonia australis

Posidonia australis seagrass meadows of the Manning-Hawkesbury ecoregion is an endangered ecological community, listed under the EPBC Act of the Commonwealth of Australia on 7 May 2015

== Description ==
The ecological community is "the assemblage of plants, animals and micro-organisms associated with seagrass meadows dominated by Posidonia australis occurring in the warm temperate Manning Shelf and Hawkesbury Shelf bioregions on the east coast of Australia." It occurs subtidal waters at depths from less than 1 m to 10m within the sheltered environments of estuaries on the coastline from Wallis Lake to Port Hacking. It is found on sand and silty mud and in these estuarine waters the salinity is close to marine levels.

The meadows of the community occur as both monospecific meadows (of P. australis) or as multispecies meadows (with, for example, P. australis together with Zostera muelleri subsp. capricorni, Halophila ovalis). The macrophyte, Ruppia, may also be found growing within the ecological community (Creese et al., 2009). The leaves of Posidonia australis provide a place for many benthic flora, including epiphytes, to grow. These epiphytes photosynthesise and their proportion within the meadows is largely dependant on the nutrients available in the water.

Fauna found within the shelter of the meadows include: protozoans, bacteria, harpacticoid copepods, ostracods, nematodes, polychaetes, bivalves, amphipods, cumaceans, holothurians, phoronids, rotifers, isopods; small decapods, gastropods, pycnogonids, echinoderms, nemerteans, hydroids, bryozoans, sponges; ascidians; serpulid polychaetes, and fish.

== Threats ==
1. Coastal development
2. Dredging
3. Boat mooring and boating activities
4. Catchment disturbance and pollution
5. Climate change
