= Veit Brecher Wittrock =

Swedish botanist (1839–1914)

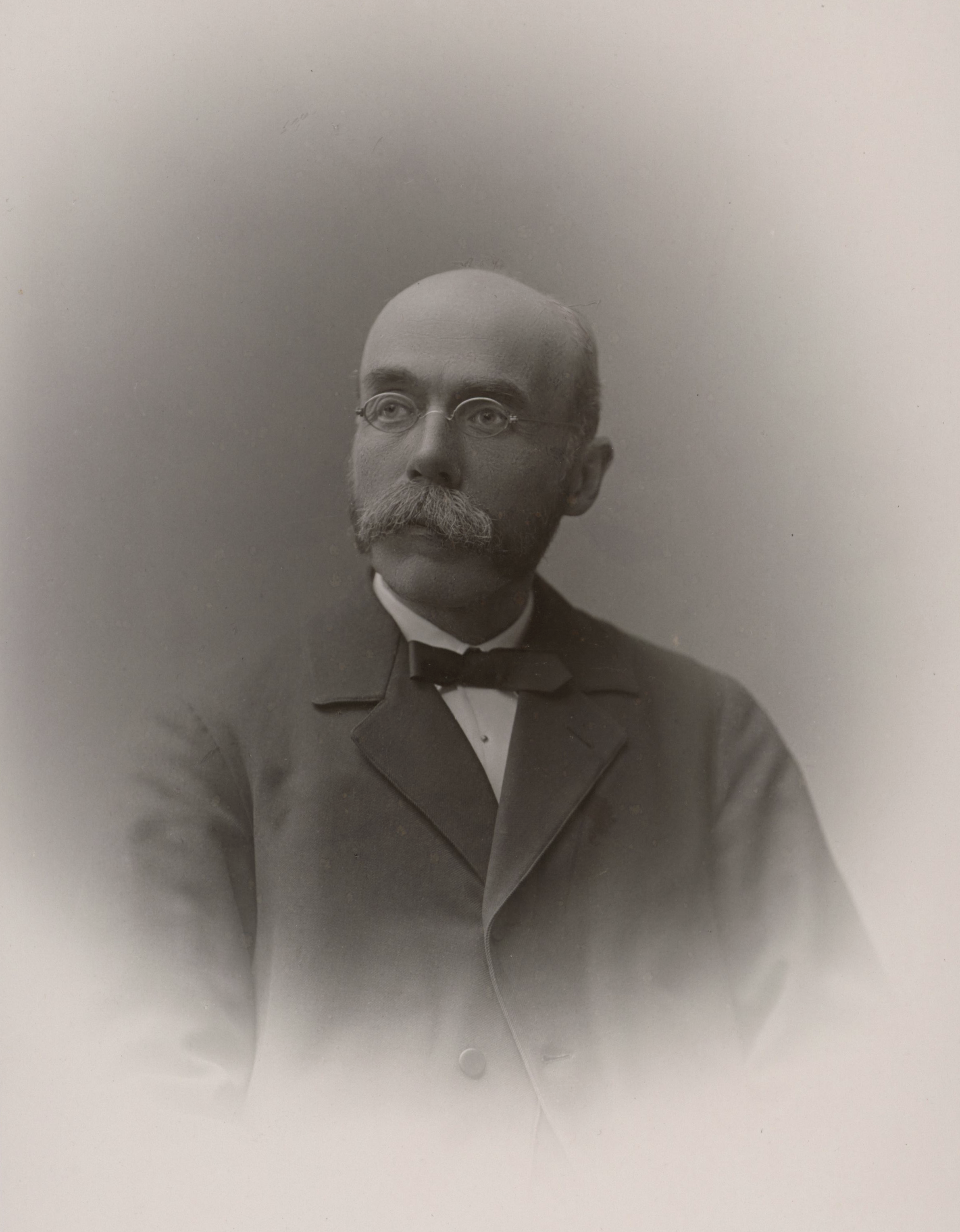
Veit Brecher Wittrock in 1899

Veit Brecher Wittrock (5 May 1839 at district of Dalsland – 1 September 1914 in Stockholm) was a Swedish botanist known for his work in the field of phycology and for his research on the genus Viola. and the genus Centaurium, formerly Erythrea, with the exsiccata Erythraeae exsiccatae.

== Biography ==
From 1857 to 1865 he studied at the University of Uppsala, then spent the next thirteen years as a gymnasium teacher in Uppsala. In 1878 he became an associate professor at the University of Uppsala. From 1879 to 1904 he served as a professor and curator of the botanical collections at the Naturhistoriska riksmuseet in Stockholm. In Stockholm, he was also a professor and director of the Bergianska trädgården (1879–1914).

== Botanical eponymy ==
- Wittrockia: Bromeliad genus circumscribed by Carl Axel Magnus Lindman in 1891.
- Wittrockiella: Algae genus circumscribed by Nordal Wille in 1909.
- Viola × wittrockiana: the garden pansy

== Selected works ==
- Försök till en monographi öfver algslägtet Monostroma, 1866.
- Algologiska studier. I och II, 1867.
- Dispositio oedogoniacearum suecicarum, 1870.
- Prodromus monographiae oedogoniearum, 1874.
- "On the development and systematic arrangement of the Pithophoraceæ, a new order of algae", 1877.
- Skandinaviens gymnospermer, 1887.
- Viola studier (1895–1897; 2 volumes).
- Botanisk-historiska fragment, 1906.
- (As editor): Acta horti Bergiani. Meddelanden från Kungl. Svenska vetenskaps-akademiens Trädgård Bergielund.

With Otto Nordstedt he edited the exsiccata series Algae aquae dulcis exsiccatae praecipue Scandinavicae quas adjectis algis marinis Chlorophyllaceis et Phycochromaceis distribuerunt Veit Wittrock et Otto Nordstedt, adjuvantibus Dr. P. T. Cleve et F. R. Kjellman (1877–1879), continued by superseding series until 1903.
