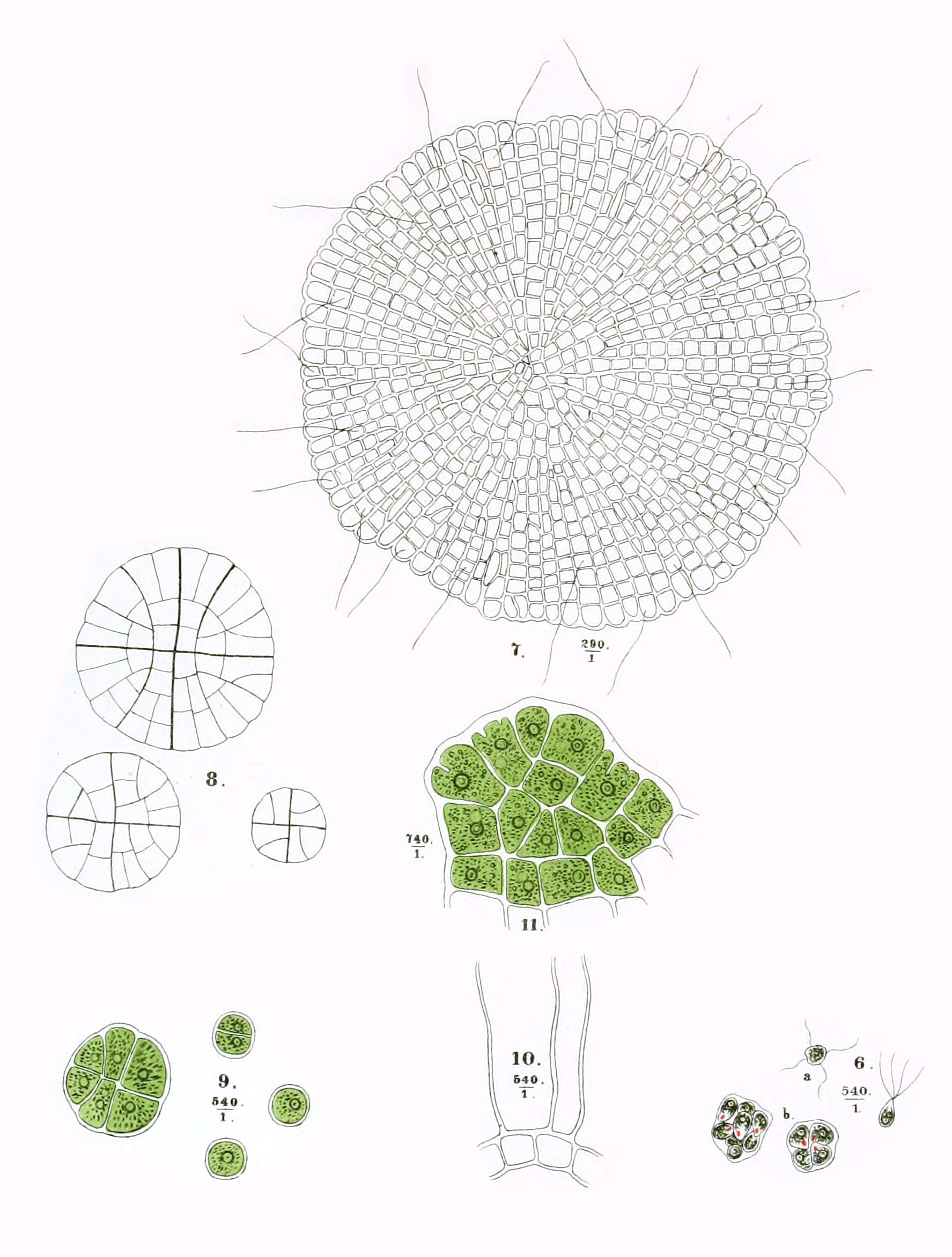
- Chaetopeltis orbicularis

Scientific classification
- Kingdom: Plantae
- Division: Chlorophyta
- Class: Chlorophyceae
- Order: Chaetopeltidales
- Family: Chaetopeltidaceae
- Genus: Chaetopeltis; Berthold
- Species: C. orbicularis

Binomial name
- Chaetopeltis orbicularis Berthold

= Chaetopeltis =

Genus of algae

Chaetopeltis is a genus of green algae in the order Chaetopeltidales, containing a single species, Chaetopeltis orbicularis. It is an epiphyte on aquatic plants and filamentous algae. It is a freshwater organism, preferring flowing water; it is generally common but often overlooked.

Chaetopeltis is unicellular when young but later grows into a flattened, disc-shaped colony of cells up to 1 mm in diameter and one cell thick. The cells are 15–20 μm wide and 15–30 μm long, with rounded or angular by mutual compression; cells may have one or two long pseudocilia attached, oriented perpendicularly to the disc. The chloroplast is parietal and contains a pyrenoid. Cells contain

Asexual reproduction occurs by the formation of two to eight zoospores, which are quadriflagellate; sexual reproduction has also been observed and it is isogamous.

Chaetopeltis is usually similar in morphology to Coleochaete, but that genus lacks contractile vacuoles and has basally sheathed setae. It is variable in morphology, and single-celled individuals have been described under different names, namely Oligochaetophora and Polychaetophora.
