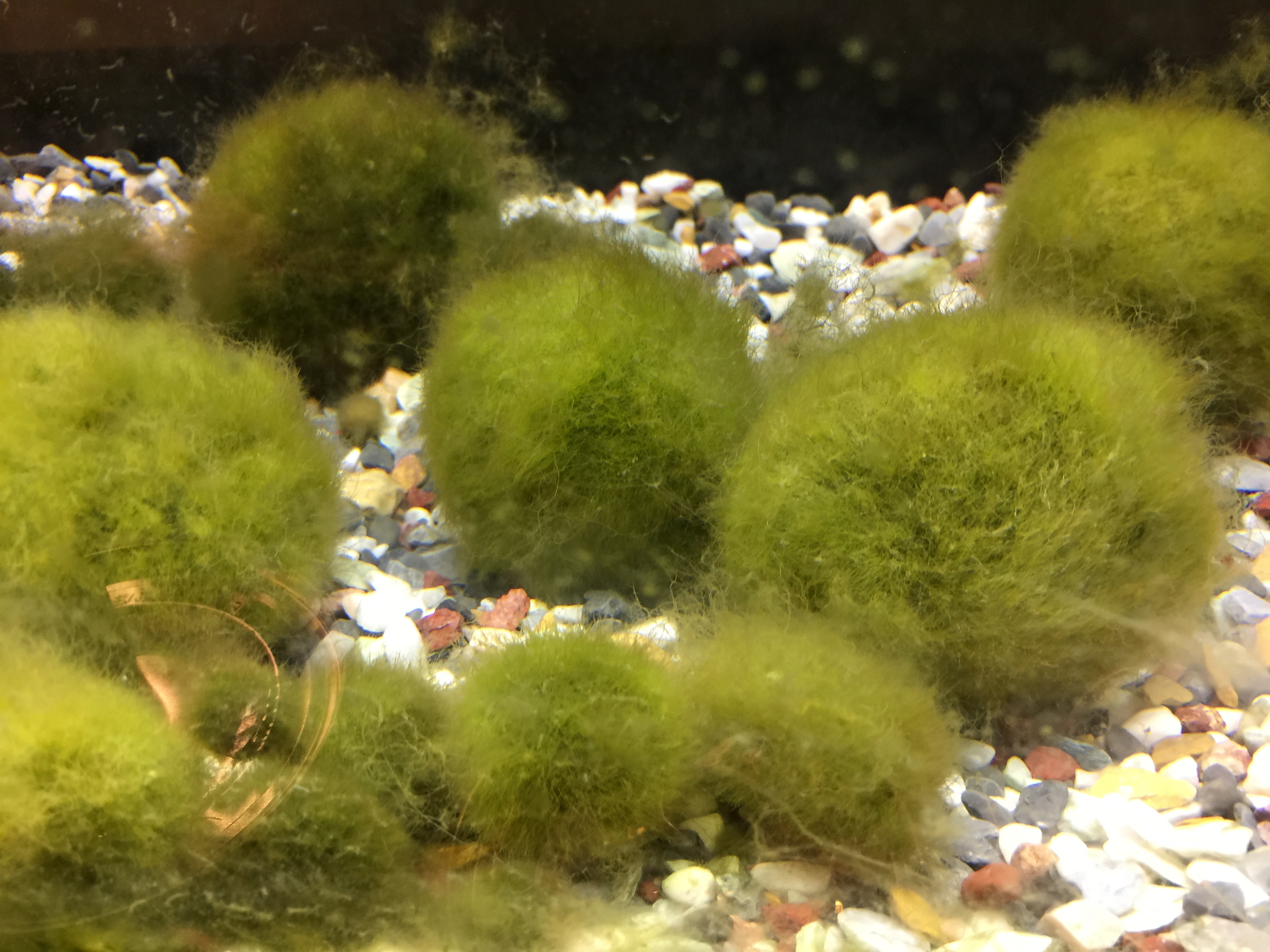
- Marimo, Aegagropila linnaei

Scientific classification
- Domain: Eukaryota
- Supergroup: Archaeplastida
- Clade: Viridiplantae
- Division: Chlorophyta
- Class: Ulvophyceae
- Order: Cladophorales
- Family: Pithophoraceae; Wittrock

Genera
- Aegagropila; Aegagropilopsis; Arnoldiella; Basicladia; Chaetocladiella; Chaetonella; Chlorocladiella; Cladogonium; Cladostroma; Dermatophyton; Gemmiphora; Pithophora; Wittrockiella

= Pithophoraceae =

Family of algae

Pithophoraceae is a family of green algae in the order Cladophorales.

The Pithophoraceae consist of filamentous algae. Although there are no clear unifying features, there are morphological characters shared by many of the genera: the presence of secondary rhizoids, lateral branches inserted subterminally, and a tendency for heterotrichous organization (i.e., the division of the thallus into a two parts, a prostrate and an erect system of filaments). In most genera, the thalli are attached to the substrate, except for Pithophora.

Members of this family are found in freshwater, brackish or terrestrial habitats, where they grow on substrates such as moist mud, limestone or rocks. Some grow on the shells of turtles or snails. These habitats often have fluctuating environmental conditions and reduced competition.

A hypothesis of the phylogenetic relationships between taxa are as follows (not all genera are included due to lack of molecular data):

- - Wittrockiella
  - - Basicladia okamurae
    - - - Basicladia ramulosa
        - Arnoldiella
      - - - Aegagropila
          - Pithophora
        - - Aegagropilopsis
          - Chlorocladiella
