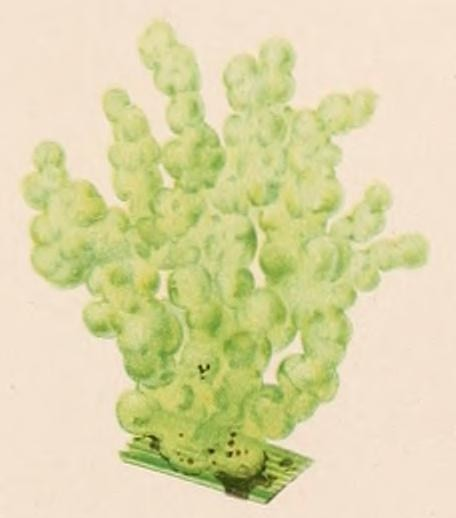
- Illustration of Tetraspora gelatinosa

Scientific classification
- Domain: Eukaryota
- Supergroup: Archaeplastida
- Clade: Viridiplantae
- Division: Chlorophyta
- Class: Chlorophyceae
- Order: Chlamydomonadales
- Family: Tetrasporaceae
- Genus: Tetraspora; Link ex Desv.

Species
- Tetraspora gigantea; Tetraspora giraudii; Tetraspora godeyi; Tetraspora hexanematoidea; Tetraspora imperfecta; Tetraspora intestinalis; Tetraspora intricata; Tetraspora gelatinosa; Tetraspora lacunosa; Tetraspora lacustris; Tetraspora lamellosa; Tetraspora lateralis; Tetraspora lemmermannii; Tetraspora limnetica; Tetraspora lubrica; Tetraspora nygaardii; Tetraspora biasoletto; Tetraspora hariot; Tetraspora pseudovolvox; Tetraspora risoensis; Tetraspora simplex; Tetraspora tenera; Tetraspora ulvacea; Tetraspora vandalurensis

= Tetraspora =

Genus of algae

Tetraspora is a genus of green algae in the family Tetrasporaceae of the order Chlamydomonadales, division Chlorophyta. Species of Tetraspora are unicellular green algae that exist in arrangements of four and consist of cells being packaged together in a gelatinous envelope that creates macroscopic colonies. These are primarily freshwater organisms, although there have been few cases where they have been found inhabiting marine environments and even contaminated water bodies. Tetraspora species can be found all around the globe, except in Antarctica. Despite the ubiquitous presence, the greatest growth of the genera's species is seen in the polar climatic zones.

Tetraspora species are non-motile and instead of having flagella, they possess pairs of pseudoflagella which are part of the pseudociliary apparatus. On average the cell diameter of Tetraspora ranges from 6-13 μm. Energy is accumulated via photosynthesis through two cup-shaped chloroplasts, making the species primary producers. Blooms have been noted in contaminated environments due to excess augmentation of ammonia from industrial waste and are now being associated with the drop in biodiversity in such water bodies.

Both sexual and asexual reproduction are possible for species within this genus. In addition, mitosis is well-defined in Tetraspora species; particularly investigated in T. gelatinosa. Cell division involves the elaborate arrangement of microtubules, basal body complexes and involve the use of structures like phycoplasts and protoplast.

Studies have shown the antimicrobial properties of certain species. In addition, Tetraspora is an important photobiological hydrogen producer and therefore is intensively being looked at for biofuel purposes. As of 2019, thirty species have been classified into this genus.

== Etymology ==
The genus name Tetraspora is derived from the word tetrad; which refers to the confirmation of four. Tetra is Greek for four and spora is Latin for cells, thus describing species of this genus as existing in groups of four.

== History ==
The genus Tetraspora was first described by Link ex Desvaux in the year 1818, where the purpose for the genus was to organize algae with spores arranged in confirmations of tetrads. In the very first classifications, species of Tetraspora were classified into the order Tetrasporales under Chlorophyta. However, with molecular analysis, it was found that Tetraspora species had similar basal body morphology to Chlamydomonas and also had molecular similarity in the SSU rDNA. This changed the classification from being under the order Tetrasporales to order Chlamydomonadales (or Volvocales), where they still reside today.

== Habitat ==
Tetraspora species are primarily freshwater organisms which inhabit ecosystems like streams, lakes, rivers, ponds. They can be found in harsh environments like thermal effluents and industrial waste. However, just recently it has been found that Tetraspora species have the ability to adapt and reside in marine environments that are exceptionally nutrient rich and receive freshwater river outflows. Species have been found in both stagnant and free flowing water bodies, although morphology of species between the two water types slightly differs. Physio-chemical studies of the habitats have shown that Tetraspora species tolerate wide pH ranges: (4.5-9.63) but are most commonly found in water bodies with a pH between 6–7. Likewise, the optimal growth conditions for species of the genus Tetraspora are alkaline, low mesotrophic and shallow bodies of freshwater. Interestingly, species have also shown to be most abundant and well established on the beds of slow-flowing streams and rivers; where they generally take on the form of thin filamentous macroscopic colonies.

Tetraspora species are found on every continent, with the exception of Antarctica, and can be located at all latitudes. Therefore, they are found in all climatic zones: polar, tropics, warm and cool temperate zones and the equatorial zones. While they can be present in all climatic zones, the most optimal zones are cool temperate and the polar zones. This is because of the species preferring cold water to warm.

== Ecology ==
Like most other green algae, Tetraspora also is photoautotrophic. Their ability to conduct photosynthesis, establishes them at the starting point of aquatic food chains and food webs. Tetraspora function as primary producers and hence are responsible for capturing and assimilating the energy that will be passed down subsequent trophic levels.

In water bodies associated with sewage waste, industrial waste and fishery waste, Tetraspora blooms have been documented. Spewing of sewage, industrial and fishery wastes leads to anthropogenic eutrophication, where there is excess augmentation of ammonia; a principal nitrogen source for certain species of Tetraspora. The excess nitrogen is proposed to contribute to uncontrolled cell proliferation of Tetraspora colonies; resulting in algal blooms. Tetraspora blooms have negative effects on the overall environmental ecology because they shift and alter the chemical properties of the water. This is because with the mass growth, hypoxia and/or anoxia can occur and these may have detrimental effects on biodiversity and survivability of other organisms such as fish.

== Morphology ==
Species of the genus Tetraspora are unicellular green algae, in which the individual cells are non-motile and are shaped spherically or elliptically. These individual cells are arranged in sets or multiples of four; these could be in the arrangement of four-by-four cells or two-by-two. All cells are encased within a macroscopic mucilaginous matrix, that creates macroscopic colonies. Within the envelope, the cells are uniformly distributed and overall, the mucilaginous envelope creates an irregular outline with asymmetrical shapes and edges.

The size of cells has been found to vary based on the type of Tetraspora species and the type of climatic zone the species is found in. On average the diameter of species in the genus Tetraspora ranges from 6-13 μm, with the species in the tropics usually being the smallest (6-9 μm), followed by the temperate zone species (6-14 μm), and the polar species (7.5-13 μm). The difference in cell size therefore also impacts sizes of the colonies, but sizes of colonies also vary with whether the cells are residing in stagnant or flowing water. In stagnant water, colonies may range from 5–10 cm in length, while in flowing water, colonies may reach lengths up to 50 cm. In addition to impacting colony size, the type of water (stagnant or free flowing) also impacts the morphology of the colonies. Most macroscopic colonies of Tetraspora are cylindrical in nature, but in stagnant water colonies may appear as short sacs and clubs with thalli that resemble balloons. Flowing water colonies on the other hand, tend to form narrow cylindrical structures with the thalli also being more or less cylindrical and sometimes can be lightly rounded at the sheaths.

== Cellular structures/anatomy ==
Species in the genus Tetraspora contain two pseduoflagella as a part of the pseudociliary apparatus, two cup-shaped chloroplasts with chlorophyll A and B pigments, a single pyrenoid and contractile vacuoles located inside the cytoplasm. Additionally, starch grains can be seen covering the pyrenoid and the walls of the cells are noted to be thin.

Tetraspora species do not possess a flagellum of the 9+2 microtubular fibre configuration, instead they have pseudoflagellum with a 9+0 fibre confirmation; where the central two tubular fibres are absent. There are two pseduoflagelulla that exist in a pair and both protrude from the anterior region of the cell and into the gelatinous matrix. Additionally, it has been found that the pseudoflagella are longer than the actual cells. The pseudoflagella is part of the pseudociliary apparatus, which consists of a cytoplasmic microtubule system, striated fibre system, basal bodies, and the pseudoflagella themselves. Pseudoflagella each display a striped pattern, where they are seen to regularly have striped structures of light and dark sections of equal length. On average, the length of pseudoflagella is from 70 to 120 μm long and 0.70-1.60 μm wide, but they can get up to 155 μm in length.

== Life cycle ==
Reproduction in the genus Tetraspora can be both sexual and asexual. Sexual reproduction occurs through isogamous means, but occasionally depending on the species, it can also be isogamous or oogamous. Asexual division in Tetraspora occurs via mitotic division; the products can be two or four uninucleate daughter cells. In addition to vegetative cells, asexual reproduction can also produce zoospores, which may act as autospores ranging from two to eight per cell.

When living conditions become less favourable, many species of the genus Tetraspora also have the ability to form into hypanospores called akineties. Akineties are thick-walled spores that are brown in colour with a diameter of 12.9-15.80 μm and a cell wall thickness of 0.6-1.10 μm. They function as resting cells which are resistant to cold temperatures and desiccation. The process of division of mature akineties is done by amoeboid protoplasts located inside the mucilaginous envelopes.

Cell division in Tetraspora species has been described. It is noted that prior to mitosis beginning, cells become immotile and the basal bodies located at the surface of cells start to retreat in. This causes the preprophase nucleus to migrate toward retreating basal body complex, around which microtubules start to gather. The basal body complex arranges itself to be closely associated with one pole of the cell, creating a mitotic spindle known as open polar fenestrae. Furthermore, it is speculated that the spindle itself may also be unicentric. Eventually, microtubules extend from the spindle, and during anaphase, they penetrate through the fenestrae and split the nucleus. Subsequently, to telophase, the nucleus reforms, but a phycoplast forms. In addition, a protoplast is found inside the cell wall and is noted to rotate within the wall during cleavage; a process known to occur by the cell undergoing furrowing.

== Practical importance ==
Phytotoxic and cytotoxic activity analysis of some Tetraspora species displayed antibiotic activities against specific fungal and bacterial species, meaning that Tetraspora species may help develop or compose antibiotics. In addition, species of Tetraspora are known to be high hydrogen producing organisms. This is significant because hydrogen gas is considered a promising clean fuel. This means that Tetraspora species may potentially act as photobiological hydrogen producers and green biofuels.
