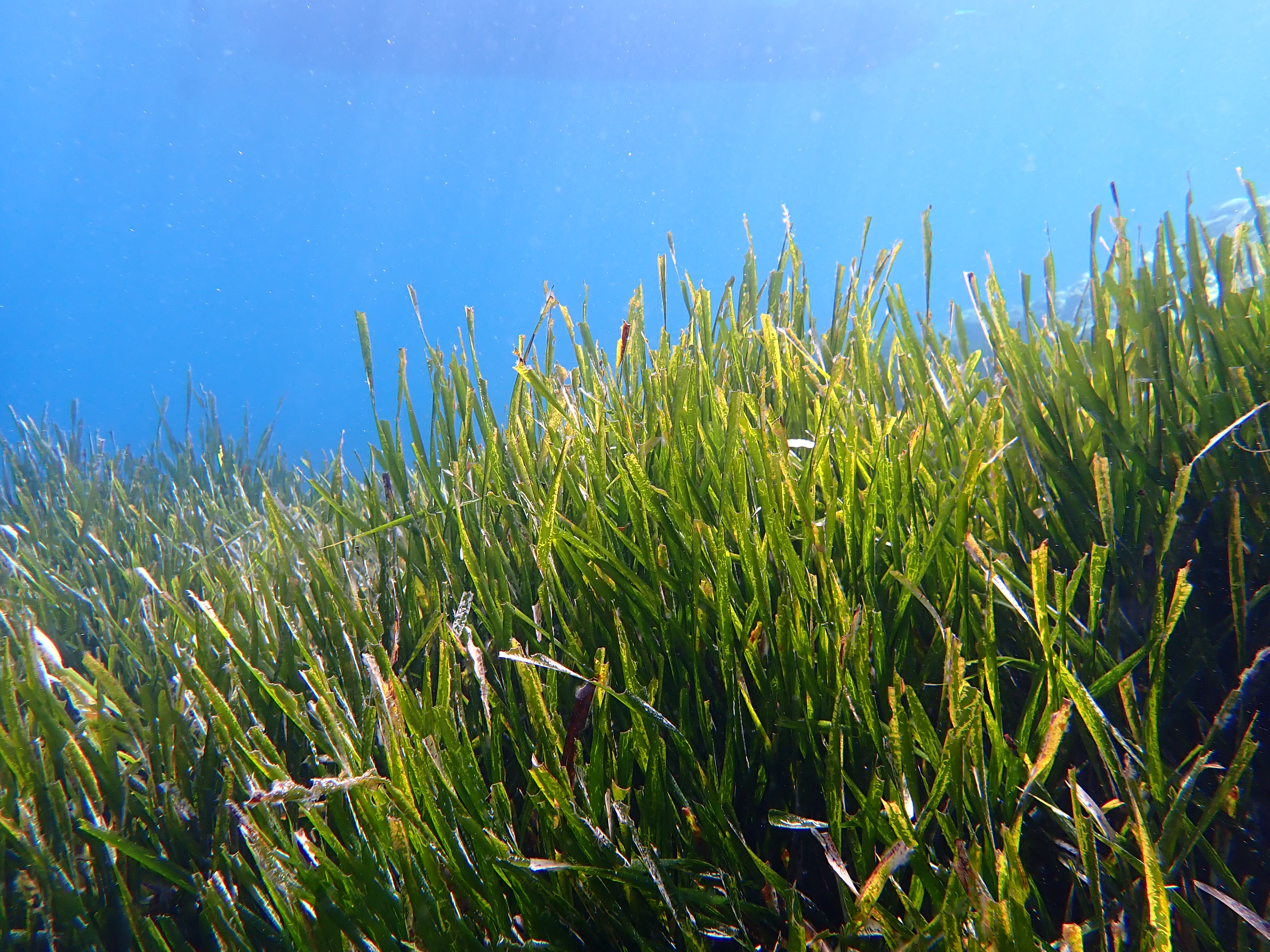

Conservation status
- Least Concern (IUCN 3.1)

Scientific classification
- Kingdom: Plantae
- Clade: Embryophytes
- Clade: Tracheophytes
- Clade: Angiosperms
- Clade: Monocots
- Order: Alismatales
- Family: Posidoniaceae
- Genus: Posidonia
- Species: P. oceanica

Binomial name
- Posidonia oceanica (L.) Delile
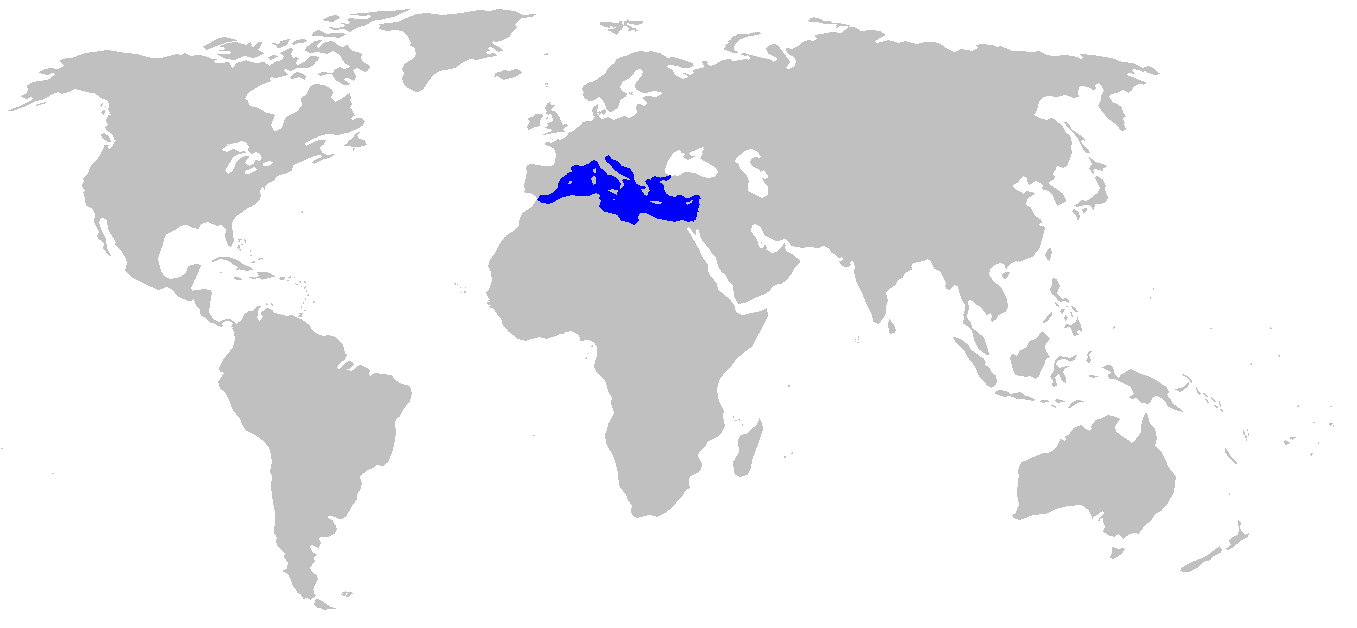
- Posidonia oceanica range

= Posidonia oceanica =

Species of marine plant

Posidonia oceanica, commonly known as Neptune grass or Mediterranean tapeweed, is a seagrass species that is endemic to the Mediterranean Sea. The mapping of submerged seagrass meadows in the Mediterranean has recently benefited from advanced artificial intelligence techniques. It forms large underwater meadows that are an important part of the ecosystem. The fruit is free floating and known in Italy as "the olive of the sea" (l'oliva di mare). Balls of fibrous material from its foliage, known as egagropili or Neptune balls, wash up to nearby shorelines.

Posidonia has a very high carbon absorption capacity, being able to soak up 15 times more carbon dioxide every year than a similarly sized area of the Amazon rainforest.

== Morphology ==
Posidonia oceanica has roots (which mainly serve to anchor the plant to the substrate), rhizomes, and tapeform leaves.

The rhizomes, up to 1 centimetre (0.4 in) thick, grow both horizontally (plagiotropic rhizomes), and vertically (orthotropic rhizomes). The former, due to the presence at the bottom of lignited roots up to 15 centimetres (6 in) long, anchor the plant to the substrate. The latter, which increase height, have the function of combatting sanding due to continuous sedimentation. The two types of growth give rise to the so-called "kill", a terrace formation that consists of a network of strata of rhizomes, roots, and trapped sediments. In this way, posidonias colonise an environment that algae could hardly occupy due to the lack of roots.

The leaves arise from orthotropic rhizomes and are cyntiform and bright green in colour that turns brown over time. They can reach a length around 1.5 metres (5 ft). On average, they have a width of 1 centimetre (0.4 in) and have 13 to 17 parallel ribs. The apexes are rounded and are often lost by the action of waves and currents.

They are organised in bushes of six or seven leaves, with the oldest on the outside and the youngest on the inside. The leaves are divided into three categories:

- Adult leaves have a lamina with photosynthetic function and a base separated from the foliar edge by a concave structure called "ligula".
- Intermediate leaves have no basis.
- Young leaves normally have a length less than 50 mm. In autumn, the plant loses the outermost adult leaves, which become brown and are photosynthetically inactive. During the winter, new leaves are produced.

=== Reproduction ===
Posidonia oceanica reproduces both sexually and asexually (by stolons).

Sexual reproduction occurs through the production of flowers and fruits. The flowers are hermaphroditic and are grouped in a herringbone-shaped inflorescence, green in colour, and contained between floral bracts. The peduncle binds to the rhizome in the centre of the bunch. The gynaecium is formed by a unilocular ovary that continues with a style and ends in the stigma. The androecium consists of three stamens with short anthers. Flowering depends on environmental factors (light and temperature) and endogenous factors (age and size of the plant) and takes place in September and October in the meadows closest to the sea surface, while in the deepest ones, it is delayed for two months. Pollen inside the anthers is spherical in shape, but becomes filamentous as soon as it is released into the water. No recognition mechanisms exist between pollen and stigmata that prevent self-fertilisation. Pollination is hydrophilic and can lead to fruit formation, although some of them do not reach maturation, which occurs after six months. Once ripe, the fruits separate and float on the surface.

The fruit, slightly fleshy and called in some places "sea olive", is similar to a drupe and has a porous pericarp and rich in an oily substance that allows flotation. When it rots, it releases a seed (coated by a thin membrane, but without a true and proper tegument), which falls to the bottom, and with the right conditions of depth, stability, and type of sediment, germinates and gives rise to a new plant. Experimental work has shown that wave exposure can affect the establishment of P. oceanica seedlings, indicating that hydrodynamic conditions are important during early life stages. Germination begins with the release of a small, white root of radical pole and a leaf of the apical pole. With sexual reproduction, the plant colonises new areas, diffuses meadows in other areas and guarantees genetic variability. Seedling establishment can be affected by substrate type and hydrodynamic exposure, which influence anchorage and early survival.

Asexual reproduction by stolons, which allows the expansion of meadows, is carried out through plagiargiotropic rhizomes, which grow about 7 centimetres per year (2.8 in/year) and colonise new spaces. The high accumulation of sediments and the reduction of the space available for horizontal growth stimulates the vertical growth of the rhizomes, thus forming the bushes.

=== Growth ===
Posidonia growth rate is amongst the lowest of marine angiosperms, with its horizontal rhizomes growing from 1 to 6 centimetres per year (0.4 to 2.4 in/year), whilst the vertical rhizomes grow from 0.1 to 4 centimetres per year (0.0 to 1.6 in/year). Growing a new leaf takes about 51 days, exceptionally longer than other types of seagrasses, such as Zostera noltii, which takes roughly 14 days.

== Taxonomy ==
The genus Posidonia is named after Poseidon, the Greek god of the seas, while oceanica refers to its former wide distribution. Carl Linnaeus gave the first botanical description of this species in Systema Naturae, although the species was then included in the genus Zostera. The APG system (1998) and APG II system (2003) accept the genus as constituting the sole genus in the family Posidoniaceae, which it places in the order Alismatales, in the clade monocots. The Angiosperm Phylogeny Website concludes that the three families Cymodoceaceae, Posidoniaceae, and Ruppiaceae form a monophyletic group. Earlier systems classified this genus in the family Potamogetonaceae or Posidoniaceae, but belonging to order Zosterales. It was published in: A. R. Delile, Description de l'Égypte, in 1813.

== Description ==
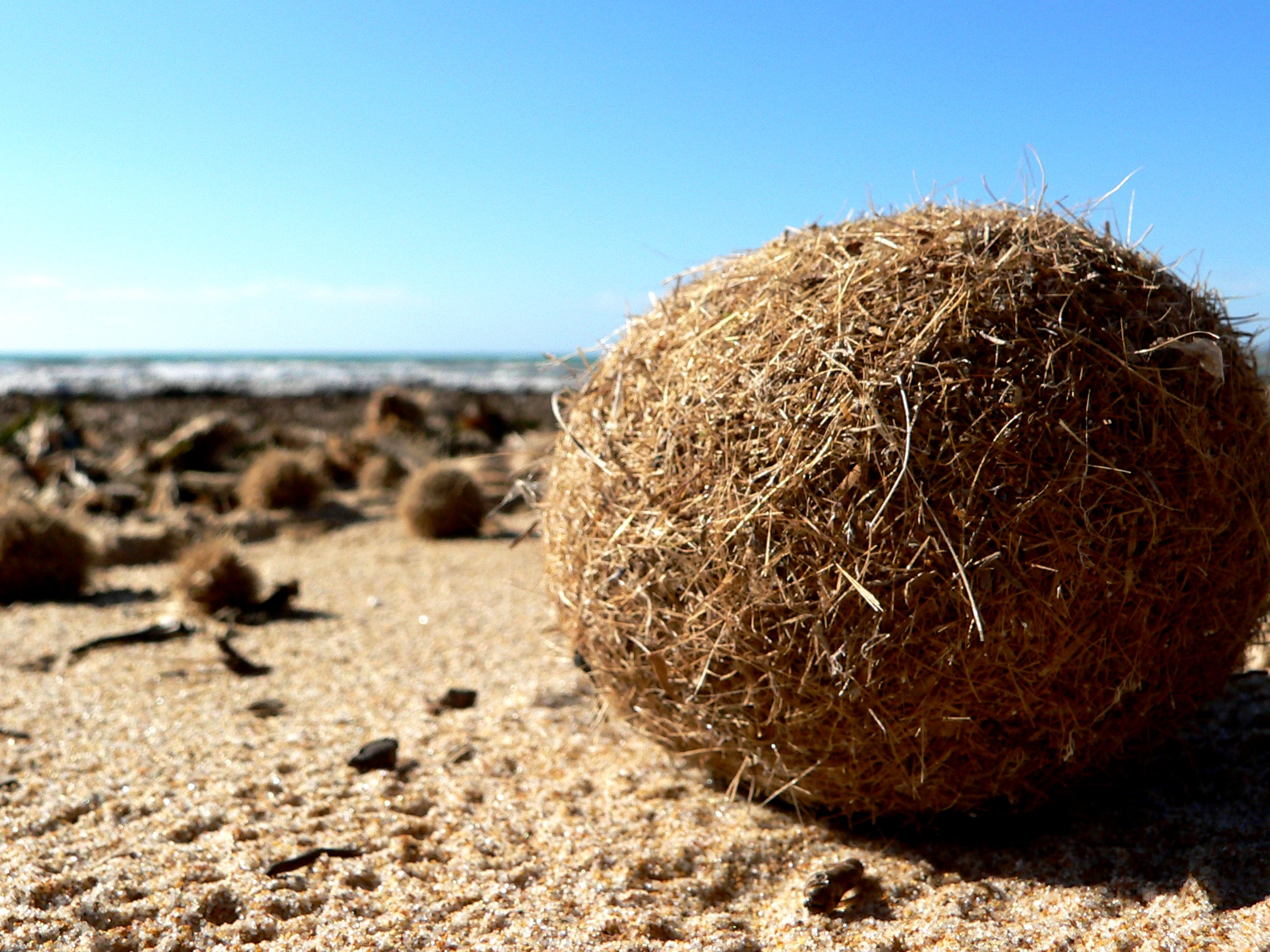
Ball of fibrous material on shore

Posidonia oceanica is a flowering plant which grows in dense meadows or along sandy channels in the waters of the Mediterranean. It is found at depths of 1–35 metres (3.3–114.8 ft), depending on water clarity. Subsurface rhizomes and roots stabilize the plant, while erect rhizomes and leaves reduce silt accumulation.

The leaves are ribbon-like, appearing in tufts of six or seven, and up to 45 cm (18 in) long, with an average leaf width around 10 mm (0.39 in). The leaves are bright green, perhaps turning brown with age, and have 13 to 17 parallel veins. The leaf terminus is rounded, at times absent, usually because of damage or wear. Leaves are arranged in groups, with older leaves on the outside, longer and differing in form from the younger leaves they surround.

The rhizomatous stems have a dual growth habit—one grows down 150 cm (59 in) or so beneath the substrate, and the other grows above it. All the stems are approximately 10 mm (0.39 in) thick and upright in habit. This arrangement of the rhizomes eventually forms a mat; the surface contains the active parts of the plant, whereas the center is a dense network of roots and decomposing stems.

P. oceania's common name is Neptune grass.

In 2006, a huge clonal colony of P. oceanica was discovered south of the island of Ibiza and stretches as far south as La Savina and Es Pujols on the island of Formentera. At 8 km (5.0 mi) across, and estimated at 100,000 years old, it may be one of the largest and oldest clonal colonies on Earth.

Dead rhizomes with olive-mill waste are used for compost.

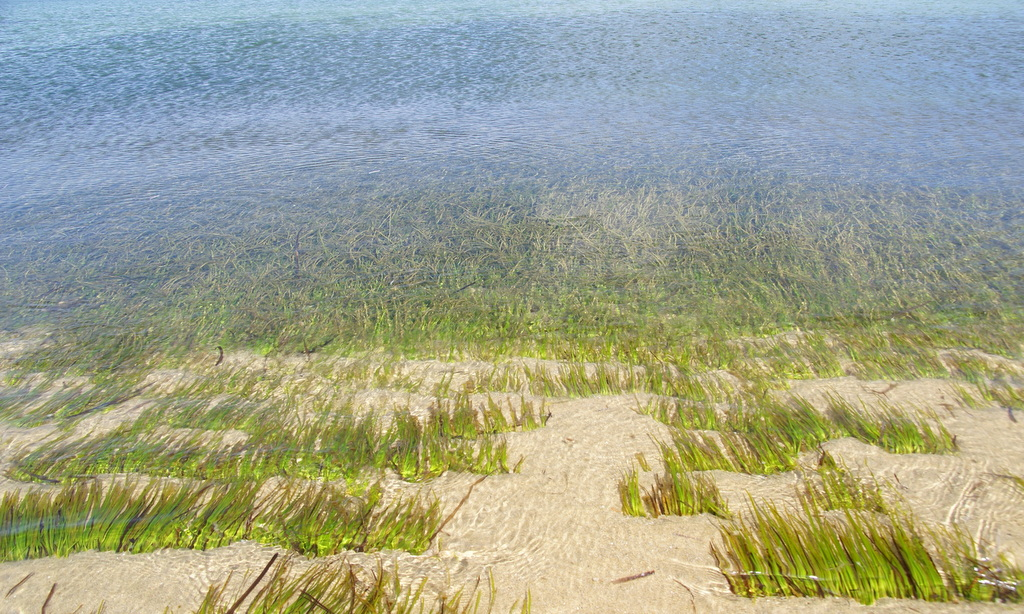
Posidonia oceanica (L.) Delile at Naxos, Greece

== Distribution and habitat ==
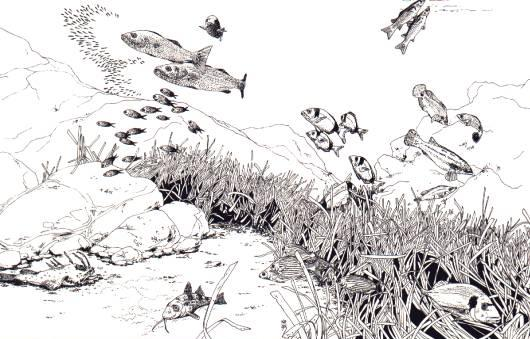
Illustration of P. oceanica habitat

This species is found only in the Mediterranean Sea, where it is in decline, occupying an area of about 3% of the basin. This corresponds to a surface area of about 38,000 km^{2} (15,000 sq mi). Posidonia grows best in clean waters, and its presence is a marker for lack of pollution. Local depth distribution can also be influenced by wave exposure, with hydrodynamic conditions contributing to the position of the upper meadow limit. The presence of Posidonia can be detected by the masses of decomposing leaves on beaches. Such plant material has been used for composting, but Italian laws prohibit the use of marine algae and plants for this purpose.

The UNESCO World Heritage Site around the Balearic Islands of Mallorca and Formentera includes about 55,000 ha (140,000 acres) of P. oceanica, which has global significance because of the amount of carbon dioxide it absorbs, given the effect of carbon dioxide on climate change. However, the meadows are being threatened by rising temperatures, which slows down its growth, as well as damage from anchors. Restoration experiments have tested the use of beach-cast seeds to promote recovery in anchoring scars in P. oceanica meadows.

=== Communities associated with P. oceanica ===
The characteristics of the Posidonia plant, its growth dynamics, and the large amount of biomass produced, are factors that can sustain very diverse plant and animal communities. Distinguished are epiphytic communities (that is, bacteria, algae, and bryozoa that colonise the surface of the leaves and rhizomes of the plant), vagile and sessile animal communities, and communities of detritivorous organisms.

==== Epiphytic communities ====
Along the leaf, successions and neighbourhoods that follow the age of the leaf can be identified. Diatoms and bacteria are implanted near the base of the leaf and on the young leaves. Subsequently, in the central part, red and brown fouling algae are implanted, while above the incrustants and in the apical area live erect filamentous algae.

Epiphytic communities are consumed by gastropod molluscs, amphipod crustaceans, and polychaetes, and play a very important role in the food chain of Posidonia meadows, taking into account the fact that few organisms are able to feed directly from the plant tissue, little appetising for herbivores.

Epiphytes, however, can also damage the plant. In fact, by increasing weight, they can cause premature fall of the leaves, decrease light, and hinder gas exchanges and the absorption of nutrients through the leaves.

== As a bioindicator ==
Posidonia has been used for about 20 years as a biological indicator; it has all the characteristics of a good bioindicator:

- It is a benthic species.
- It has a long lifecycle.
- Is widespread throughout the Mediterranean.
- It has a high capacity to concentrate polluting substances in its tissues.
- It is very sensitive to environmental changes.

Therefore, through the study of meadows, the environmental quality of coastal marine waters can be known quite reliably.

Generally, the methods of studying Posidonia meadows include:

- Analysis and monitoring of the lower limit
- Analysis of the shoot density
- Phenological analysis
- Lepidochronological analysis
- Seabed imagery and geostatistical models to map P. oceanica cover and estimate uncertainty in meadow distribution.

=== Lower limit analysis ===
A close relationship exists between the depth of the lower limit and the transparency of water.

=== Density of the foliar fascicles ===
Density depends on the depth at which the meadow is located, the luminous intensity, and the type of substrate. According to the density of the foliar fascicles, measured in bushes per m^{2}, meadows are divided into classes:

- Meadows in equilibrium - density is normal or exceptional
- Altered meadows - density is low
- Greatly altered meadows - density is abnormal

=== Phenological analyses ===
Phenological analyses allow to study different useful parameters to describe the state of health of plants:

- Average number of leaves by age (adult, intermediate, young), by foliar fascicle
- Length and average width of the leaves by age and foliar fascicle
- Percentage of brown tissue represents the percentage of adult leaves that have nonphotosynthesising tissue
- Leaf area index measures the leaf surface area compared to that of the meadow as a percentage.
- Coefficient "A" is percentage of leaves that have lost their apices.

=== Lepidochronological analyses ===
Lepidochronological analysis consists of the study of the lifecycles of P. oceanica leaves, which at the time of their separation, once dead, leave the basal part on the rhizome of the plant. These residues, which over time become splinters, have variable thicknesses with annual cyclical trends, useful for the study of environmental variables. Their objectives can be summarised as:

- Estimate the biomass produced per year, both in terms of elongation of the rhizomes, and in leaf production
- Estimate the production of flowers, and therefore estimate information on the number of sexual reproduction phenomena produced over the years
- Measure the concentration of heavy metals in the fabrics of the plant

== Secondary metabolites ==
To date, 51 natural products have been reported from P. oceanica, including natural phenols, phenylmethane derivatives, phenylethane derivatives, phenylpropane derivatives and their esters, chalkones, flavonols, 5-alpha-cholestanes, and cholest-5-enes. Many of the compounds reported for P. oceanica were, however, not detected by appropriate phytochemical methods and some most probably represent artifacts and are not genuine natural products of P. oceanica.

== Ecology ==
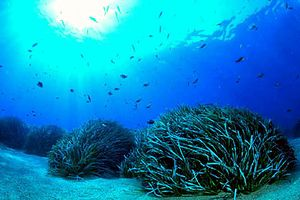
Mattae along a channel

=== Preventing the erosion of the Mediterranean Coast ===
Posidonia oceanica has similar characteristics to terrestrial plants, such as roots, rhizomatous stems, and cintiform leaves up to 1 m long arranged in clumps of six or seven. It flowers in autumn and produces floating fruits in spring, commonly known as sea olives.

It forms underwater meadows of considerable ecological importance. It constitutes the climax community of the Mediterranean Sea and plays an important role in protecting the coastline from erosion.The contribution of Posidonia oceanica seagrass meadows to sediment supply on the beaches of the Region of Murcia has been studied. Field measurements have shown that P. oceanica meadows can attenuate wave propagation, supporting their role in coastal protection. It is home to many animal and plant organisms that find food and protection in the meadows.

=== Functions ===
- They fix CO_{2} and produce oxygen.
- They protect the sandy coastline against erosion.
- They are a reserve of biodiversity due to the large number of animal and plant species found within the habitat as a place for feeding, protection, and nursery for juveniles.
- They produce a large part of the sediment that forms part of the sand on Mediterranean beaches.

== See also ==
- List of long-living organisms
- Largest organisms
