= Arnoldiella =

Scientific classification
- Domain: Eukaryota
- Supergroup: Archaeplastida
- Clade: Viridiplantae
- Division: Chlorophyta
- Class: Ulvophyceae
- Order: Cladophorales
- Family: Pithophoraceae
- Genus: Arnoldiella; V.V.Miller

Type species
- Arnoldiella conchophila V.V.Miller

Species
- Arnoldiella chelonum; Arnoldiella conchophila; Arnoldiella crassa

Genus of algae

Arnoldiella is a genus of green algae in the family Pithophoraceae. The genus name of Arnoldiella is in honour of Vladimir Mitrofanowitch (Mitrofanovich) Arnoldi (1871–1924), a Russian professor of biology.

Arnoldiella consists of a prostrate layer of coalescing filaments, from which arises a dense cushion of short, coarse, erect filaments. Cells of the prostrate layer contain one or several nuclei, while cells of the erect filaments are multinucleate. The erect filaments are uniseriate (one cell thick), and may have primary, secondary or tertiary branches. Cells of the erect filament are cylindrical, becoming shorter near the apex; each cell contains a parietal, net-like chloroplast with numerous pyrenoids. Apical cells may be rounded or pointed. The cell walls are thick and lamellated, at least for the cells near the basal parts.

Arnoldiella reproduces by zoosporangia produced at the ends of filaments; akinetes are also produced. Zoospores have four flagella and a stigma.

Arnoldiella is a freshwater genus that grows as an epiphyte on hard surfaces such as mollusc shells and the upper carapace of various turtle species. It may also grow on rocks, wood, metal, or other algae such as Cladophora.
