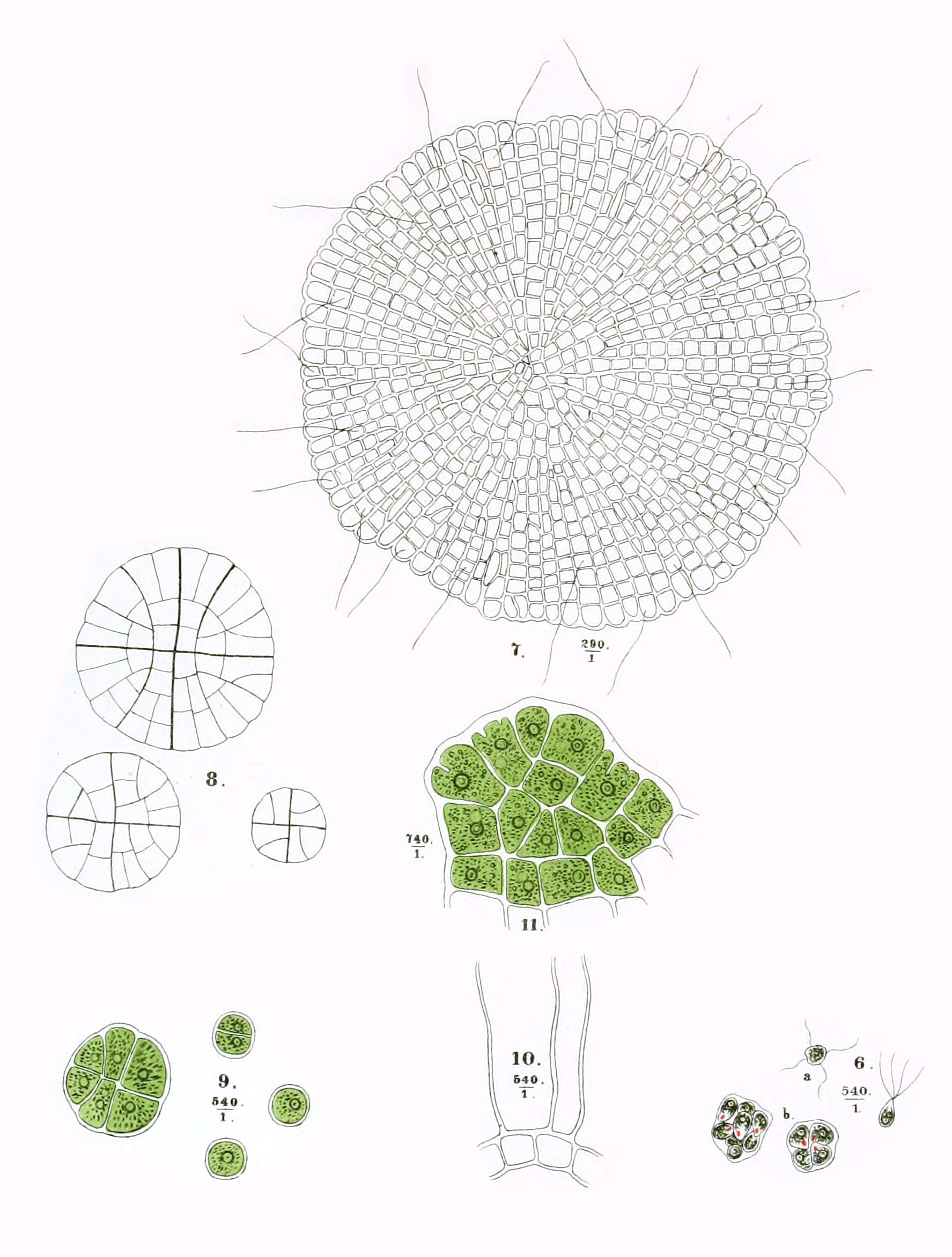
- Chaetopeltis orbicularis

Scientific classification
- Kingdom: Plantae
- Division: Chlorophyta
- Class: Chlorophyceae
- Order: Chaetopeltidales
- Family: Chaetopeltidaceae; G.S. West, 1904

Genera
- Chaetopeltis; Floydiella; Gormaniella; Hormotilopsis; Koshicola; Oncosaccus; Phyllogloea

= Chaetopeltidaceae =

Family of algae

Chaetopeltidaceae are a small family of green algae in the order Chaetopeltidales.

== Phylogeny ==
A current hypothesis of the phylogenetic relationships are as follows:

- - - - - Chaetopeltis
        - Oncosaccus
      - - Floydiella
        - Hormotilopsis gelatinosa
        - Gormaniella
    - Phyllogloea tetravacuolaris (syn. Hormotilopsis tetravacuolaris)
  - Koshicola

Phylogenetic analyses also place Pseudulvella americana as closely related to Chaetopeltis; taxonomic revisions are necessary.
