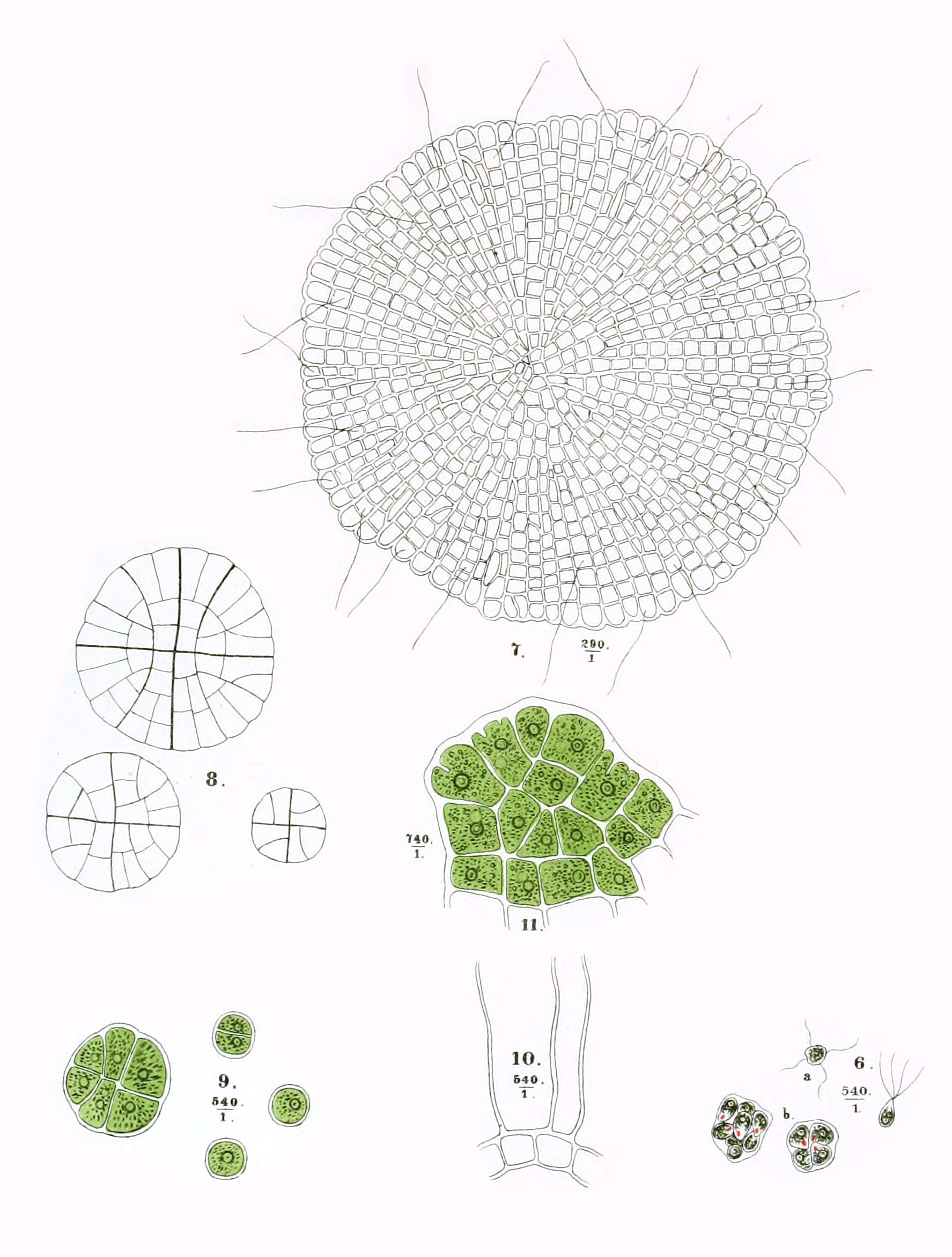
- Chaetopeltis orbicularis

Scientific classification
- Kingdom: Plantae
- Division: Chlorophyta
- Class: Chlorophyceae
- Order: Chaetopeltidales; C.J.O'Kelly, Shin Watanabe, & G.L.Floyd

Families
- Chaetopeltidaceae; Dicranochaetaceae; Hydrocytiaceae

= Chaetopeltidales =

Order of green algae in the class Chlorophyceae

Chaetopeltidales are an order of green algae in the class Chlorophyceae. In comparison to other chlorophycean orders, the order is species-poor and was circumscribed relatively recently, in 1994; the key ultrastructural features include having zoospores with four flagella, with the basal bodies in a cruciate arrangement.

Members of the Chaetopeltidales consist of unicellular, filamentous, colonial or thalloid algae. Vegetative cells lack plasmodesmata. Chloroplasts have pyrenoids which are sometimes transversed by thylakoids and cytoplasmic channels.

Phylogenetic relationships within the order are as follows:

- - - - Hydrocytiaceae
      - Koshicola
    - - Dicranochaetaceae
      - Chaetopeltidaceae
  - Chaetophorales (outgroup)
