= Nambung River =

River in Wheatbelt region of Western Australia

Coordinates: 30°32′34″S 115°08′52″E

Location
- Country: Australia

Physical characteristics
- Source
  - location: South-west of Badgingarra, Western Australia
  - elevation: 40 m (130 ft)
- Mouth
  - location: Nambung Wetlands
  - elevation: 28 m (92 ft)
- Length: 22 km (14 mi)

The Nambung River is a river in the Wheatbelt region of Western Australia, 170 kilometres (106 mi) north of Perth. The river drains an area between the towns of Cervantes and Badgingarra. In its lower reaches the Nambung River forms a chain of waterholes in the Nambung Wetlands where it disappears underground into a limestone karst system 5.5 kilometres (3.4 mi) from the Indian Ocean.

== History ==
The Nambung River was encountered by explorer George Grey on 16 April 1839, during his second disastrous expedition along the Western Australian coast. He named it Smith River after Frederick Smith, a member of his party who died from exhaustion during the final days of the expedition. Smith was the 18-year-old grandson of William Smith, prominent M.P. for Norwich, and was a first cousin to Florence Nightingale. It was renamed to Nambung River by government surveyor John Sherlock Brooking in 1874–75. The Nambung River's longest tributary was subsequently named Frederick Smith Creek.

The river was recorded as Namban in 1875 by Staff-Commander William Edwin Archdeacon, who was in charge of the Admiralty survey of the coast of Western Australia. It was described as such in the description of the Dongara to Perth stock route in 1889. The spelling Nambung was in general use from at least 1888, the name being derived from an Aboriginal word possibly meaning 'crooked' or 'winding'.

== Geography ==
The Nambung River catchment area is bounded by those of the Hill River (to the north) and Mullering Brook (to the east and south). Its main tributaries are Bibby Creek, Mount Jetty Creek and Frederick Smith Creek. The total length of the Nambung River-Frederick Smith Creek system is approximately 22 kilometres (14 mi). The river terminates at the surface in limestone karst terrain 9 km south-south-east of Cervantes, 5.5 kilometres (3.4 mi) from the Indian Ocean coast. The river makes a chain of waterholes before it disappears into a cave system. Water eventually seeps out along the coastline. The Pinnacles, within the Nambung National Park, lie within the southern part of the Nambung River catchment. The surrounding area is subject to the Nambung National Park Management Plan. Large areas of Swan Coastal Plain native bush land are well preserved within the lower reaches of the Nambung river system, dominantly comprising low scrub heath less than 2 metres (6 ft 7 in) tall.

== Geohydrology ==
The Nambung River flows underground into a karst system bounding the eastern edge of the Nambung Wetlands, within Nambung National Park. Features associated with the wetlands include salt lakes, swamps, lagoons and dunal damplands. Most lagoons and lakelets in the area are isolated from the sea and from surface creek drainage, being fed by rainfall and groundwater flow from surrounding dunes and limestone. There is a complicated hydrology with examples of 1-kilometre-long (0.62 mi) lakes appearing virtually overnight and solution pipes spouting columns of water. When the backplain to the wetlands floods, waters are filtered into a karst aquifer and into the sea via underground channels. As a consequence of the percolation of surface water through the limestone substrate, the catchment boundaries of main drainage lines become undefined over the limestone topography.

=== Salinity and geology ===
The Nambung River and Wetland have variable salinity that can be independent of surface activities. Groundwater salinity is highest at discharge boundaries formed by salt lakes, and in the lower catchment area of the river where there is saline groundwater discharge from the Jurassic Eneabba Formation and Cattamarra Coal Measures. The upward discharge of brackish groundwater from Mesozoic aquifers into superficial formations causes the salinity of the groundwater in the superficial formations locally to exceed 8,000 milligrams per litre (0.00029 lb/cu in) TDS on the Nambung River flats east of Cervantes.

=== Karst terrain ===
The superficial formations and Mesozoic formations discharge large volumes of groundwater to the sea. Much of this discharge flows through karstic solution channels in the Tamala limestone, a calcareous and siliceous formation deposited in the middle to late Pleistocene (1,500,000–10,000 years ago). Many karst features of the Tamala Limestone, the result of karst processes and include subterranean drainage through caverns and tunnels, dolines and sinkholes, residual cone hills and circular depressions, limestone pillars and root concretions, can be linked directly to the Nambung River. Caves have evolved in relation to the movement of weakly acidic water groundwater that gradually dissolves calcium carbonate in the limestone, which can be locally redeposited within caves and cavities.
