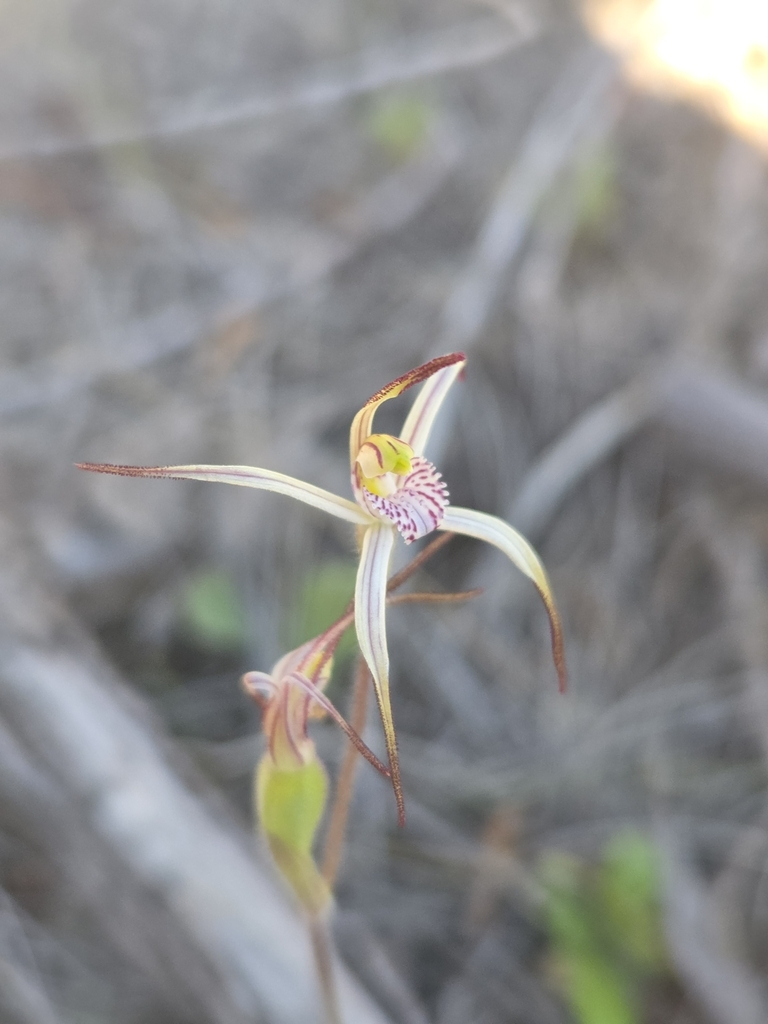
- At Pinnacles

Scientific classification
- Kingdom: Plantae
- Clade: Embryophytes
- Clade: Tracheophytes
- Clade: Spermatophytes
- Clade: Angiosperms
- Clade: Monocots
- Order: Asparagales
- Family: Orchidaceae
- Subfamily: Orchidoideae
- Tribe: Diurideae
- Genus: Caladenia
- Species: C. bicalliata

Binomial name
- Caladenia bicalliata R.S.Rogers

Synonyms
- List: Caladenia cleistogama Anon. nom. inval., nom. nud.; Caladenia filamentosa var. bicalliata (R.S.Rogers) J.Z.Weber & R.J.Bates; Calonema bicalliata Szlach. orth. var.; Calonema bicalliatum (R.S.Rogers) D.L.Jones & M.A.Clem.; Calonema bicalliatum (R.S.Rogers) Szlach.; Calonemorchis bicalliata (R.S.Rogers) Szlach. nom. superfl.; Jonesiopsis bicalliata (R.S.Rogers) D.L.Jones & M.A.Clem.; Caladenia bicalliata subsp. cleistogama auct. non Hopper & A.P.Br.

= Caladenia bicalliata =

Species of orchid

Caladenia bicalliata is a species of flowering plant in the orchid family Orchidaceae and is native to the south-west of Western Australia and coastal areas of South Australia. It has a single erect, hairy leaf and one or two cream-coloured flowers. There are two subspecies differing in the size and colour of the flowers.

== Description ==
Caladenia bicalliata is a terrestrial, perennial, deciduous, herb with an underground tuber and a single erect, hairy leaf 6–20 cm (2–8 in) long and 2–5 mm (0.08–0.2 in) wide. The inflorescence is a raceme, 20–35 cm (8–10 in) high with up to three flowers, each flower 25–70 mm (1–3 in) long and 10–40 mm (0.4–2 in) wide. The dorsal sepal is erect and abruptly narrows about one-third of its length from the base. The lateral sepals and petals are cream or greenish-cream and are much shorter than those of the similar C. abbreviata and C. evanescens. The dorsal sepals and petals have reddish-brown or pale yellow tips, depending on subspecies. The labellum is white, sometimes with red stripes and has two rows of white calli along its centre. Flowering occurs between August and early October but the flowers are only open for a day or two or may not open at all.

== Taxonomy and naming ==
Caladenia bicalliata was first formally described by Richard Rogers in 1909 from a specimen collected at Kingscote on Kangaroo Island. The description was published in Transactions, proceedings and report, Royal Society of South Australia. The specific epithet (bicalliata) refers to the two rows of calli on the labellum of this species.

There are two subspecies:

- Caladenia bicalliata subsp. bicalliata;
- Caladenia bicalliata subsp. cleistogama.

== Distribution and habitat ==
This spider orchid occurs in a narrow coastal strip, growing in calcareous soil between Kalbarri and Esperance in Western Australia and along the south-east coast but sometimes up to 100 km (60 mi) inland in South Australia.

== Conservation ==
Caladenia bicalliata is classified as "not threatened" by the Western Australian Government Department of Parks and Wildlife.
