= Southern Beekeeper's Nature Reserve =

Protected area in Western Australia

- IUCN category Ia (strict nature reserve)
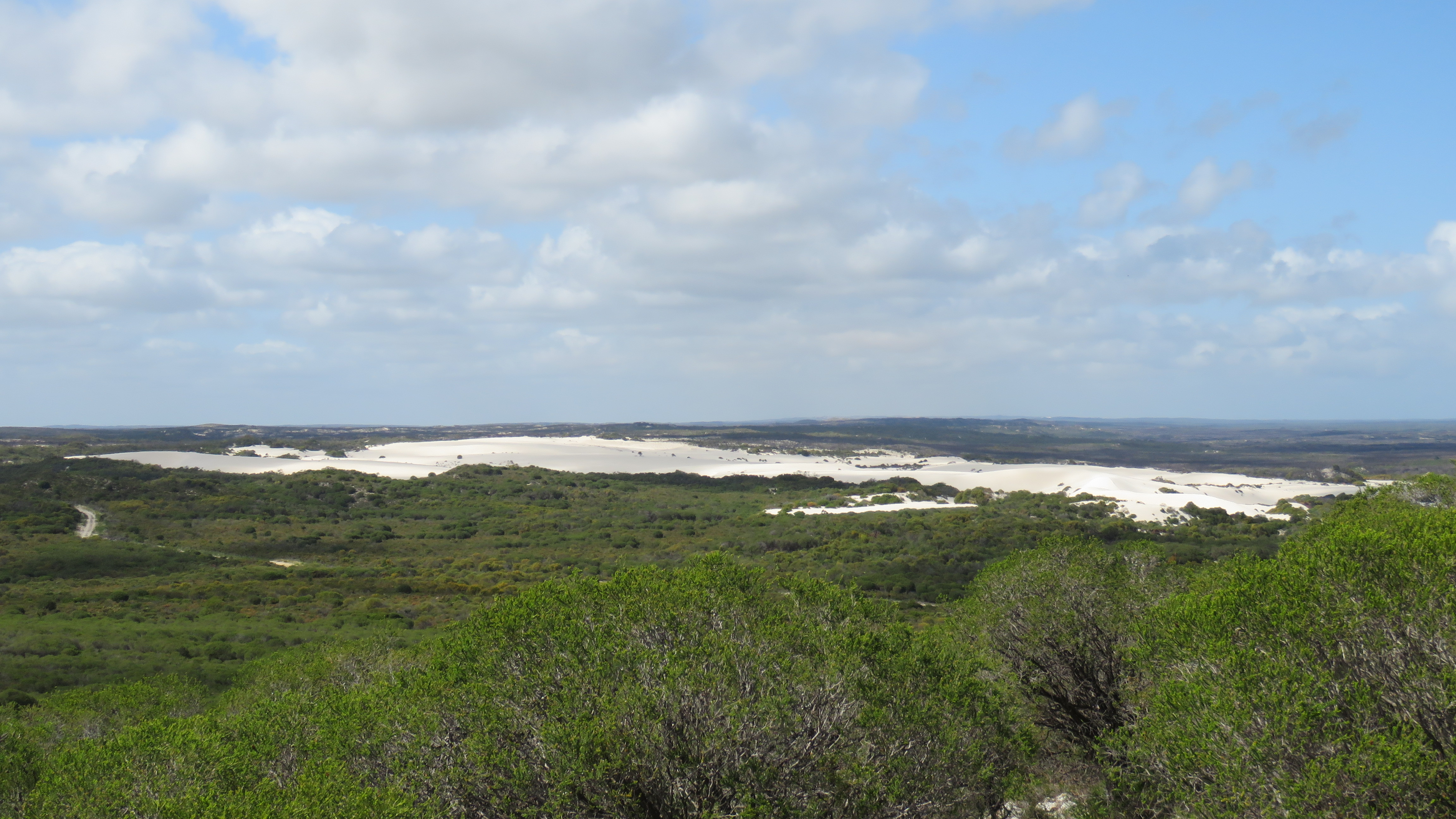
- Southern Beekeepers Nature Reserve seen from Molah Hill Lookout

- Location within Western Australia
- Location: Western Australia
- Nearest city: Cervantes
- Coordinates: 30°23′25″S 115°07′05″E
- Area: 10,842 ha (41.86 sq mi)
- Established: 1979
- Governing body: Department of Parks and Wildlife (Western Australia)

Southern Beekeeper's Nature Reserve (sometimes called Southern Beekeepers Nature Reserve) is a nature reserve in the Wheatbelt region of Western Australia, approximately 240 kilometres (149 mi) north of Perth. It is one of 90 nature reserves operated in the Department of Parks and Wildlife's Moora District. Access to much of the reserve is provided by Indian Ocean Drive. Information sites at Southern Beekeeper's include the Molah Hill vista point and Hill River.

The reserve is bordered to the southeast by Cervantes, and to the southwest by Nambung National Park. A large area of vacant Crown Land is found along much of the eastern edge.

== History ==
From 1889 until it was officially closed in 1971, a stock route between Dongara and Perth ran through what is now Southern Beekeeper's Nature Reserve and Nambung National Park. Southern Beekeeper's was gazetted by the Department of Lands and Surveys in 1979, "for the purpose of 'Apiculture and Conservation of Flora'". Officially the reserve did not have a name, but was known locally as Southern Beekeeper's as beekeeping had been taking place in the area for generations, with beekeepers starting on the coastal plains during the spring, then moving on as the season progressed.

== Natural features ==
Starting at Southern Beekeeper's in the north, and extending south across Nambung National Park and Wanagarren Nature Reserve, the area has 18 beaches along 42 kilometres (26 mi) of coastline. Some sandy areas have large, active parabolic dunes.

== Flora and fauna ==
The vegetation in the reserve is made up primarily of scrub heath and Kwongan heath. Both Banksia woodlands and clumps of tuart exists, however they are near their northern range limit. At least 18 species of invasive plants have been reported in the reserve.

Animals observed in Southern Beekeeper's Nature Reserve include six species of native mammals. Additionally 56 species of birds were identified, as well as three species of frogs and eleven of reptiles.

== Challenges ==
Cervantes is completely surrounded by protected areas, with Southern Beekeeper's Nature Reserve north of the town, and Nambung National Park south of it. In order to better protect Nambung from encroachment, excision of land from Southern Beekeeper's has been proposed in order to allow for future expansion of the townsite. Additionally mining tenements occur in the reserve.

Phytophthora dieback has been identified along roads leading to Southern Beekeeper's Nature Reserve, and infections are known to exist in nearby Nambung National Park.

== See also ==
- List of protected areas of Western Australia
- The Pinnacles
