= Ammoglyph =

An ammoglyph ("ammos" being Greek for "sand", and "glyph" being Greek for a carving, image or symbol) is a name given to fossilized art works created by early humans. They are a special kind of aeolianites. This term was coined by Charles William Helm, lead researcher in the excavation of these fossilized pieces and is a relatively new discovery within the 2019 year.

Deliberate sand impression have been discovered made in former sand dunes and beach deposits that have now been fossilized into rock and re exposed through the process of erosion. They were first noticed in coasts in the region of South Africa, an area rich in early rock art. They are dated to the Middle-Late Pleistocene, approximately 158,000 to 70,000 years ago. The sand impressions are theorized to have shown indications of foraging or development of symbols and patterns as a means of communication or art. Such patterns that have been discovered include repetitive figures in the shapes of circles and stylistic techniques that display lines in zig-zags, parallel lines, and cross-hatches. Similar rock markings in the site provide evidence to the theory that the ammoglyphs were also made by humans. Aside from sand impressions, South Africa's coast has also been home to well-preserved archives that indicate evidence of early life, such as rock engravings and jewelry.

== Fossilization Process ==
The multi-step process that allowed for the preservation of the sand impressions included multiple layers of sediment drying and hardening before it could be impacted by wind erosion or water. Engravings or prints were usually left on wet sand, and eventually covered by dry sediment and left untouched. As more sediment piles onto the imprints or engravings, over time, it becomes compressed and hardens into a rock-like substance. The natural process protects the impressions and allows them to remain preserved as fossils over time.

== Discovered Ammoglyphs ==
The most prominent fossil currently being analyzed is a "circular feature with a central depression," which also contains apparent knee prints aside the piece of rock that is engraved. To create this circular engraving, it is assumed that the materials used were similar to that of a compass today. While using a forked stick, the engraver held the stick in the middle and fully created the circle, which also serves as an explanation for the slight discontinuity of the connecting ends of the shape.

An additional piece of evidence currently being considered as an ammoglyph is a rock fragment containing multiple levels of symmetry. Although symmetry does not frequently imply man-made etchings and engravings, the several levels within this one piece of rock insinuates human effects on the rock. On this stingray-shaped rock, the symmetrical shape and intersecting cross-etchings accompanied by additional lines and round piercings further supports the ideology that this rock had been etched by humans.

== Challenges to Developing Research ==
Due to the upcoming prevalence of this research, a couple challenges have arisen to understanding and interpreting the cruciality of each ammoglyph discovered. Primarily, due to the nature of such indentations found within each fossil (i.e. patterns, lines, and grooves), researchers have found it increasingly difficult to identify whether the indentations were created by man or due to natural causes. When this issue arises, researchers and archaeologists alike are searching for what Helm refers to as a "hominin signature" within the patterns they found.

In addition to the issue of distinguishing man-made etchings from natural markings, the rock surfaces on the beach where these fossils were found have also potentially been utilized for modern graffiti locations. Therefore, there is not only an arising issue of distinguishing man-made from natural impressions, but also modern and "ancient anthropogenic origin." From such graffiti, it may be simple to distinguish hearts and other recently popular symbols, but the markings of more abstract forms become increasingly convoluted with those of ancient origin.
