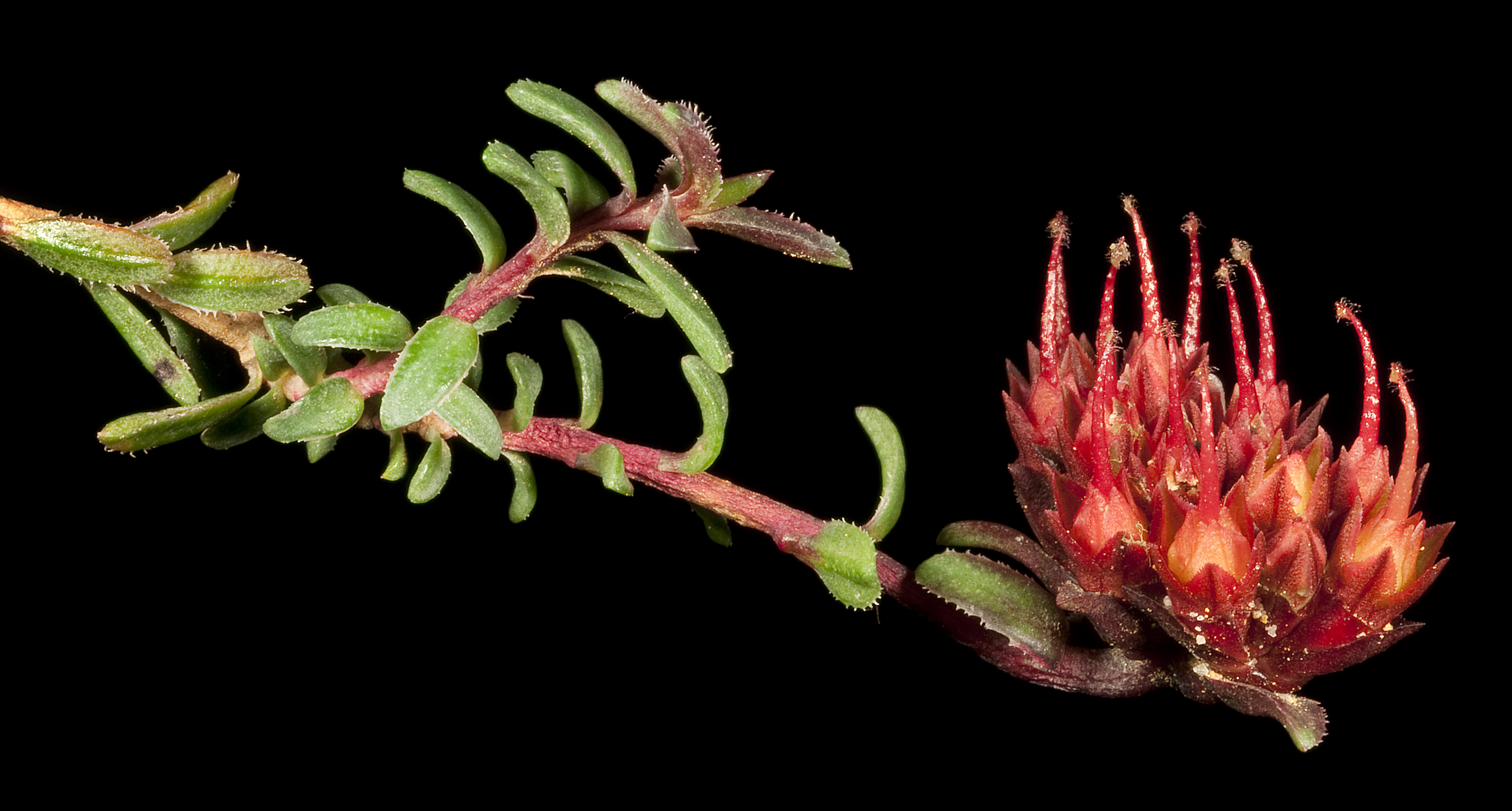

Scientific classification
- Kingdom: Plantae
- Clade: Tracheophytes
- Clade: Angiosperms
- Clade: Eudicots
- Clade: Rosids
- Order: Myrtales
- Family: Myrtaceae
- Genus: Darwinia
- Species: D. sanguinea

Binomial name
- Darwinia sanguinea (Meisn.) Benth.
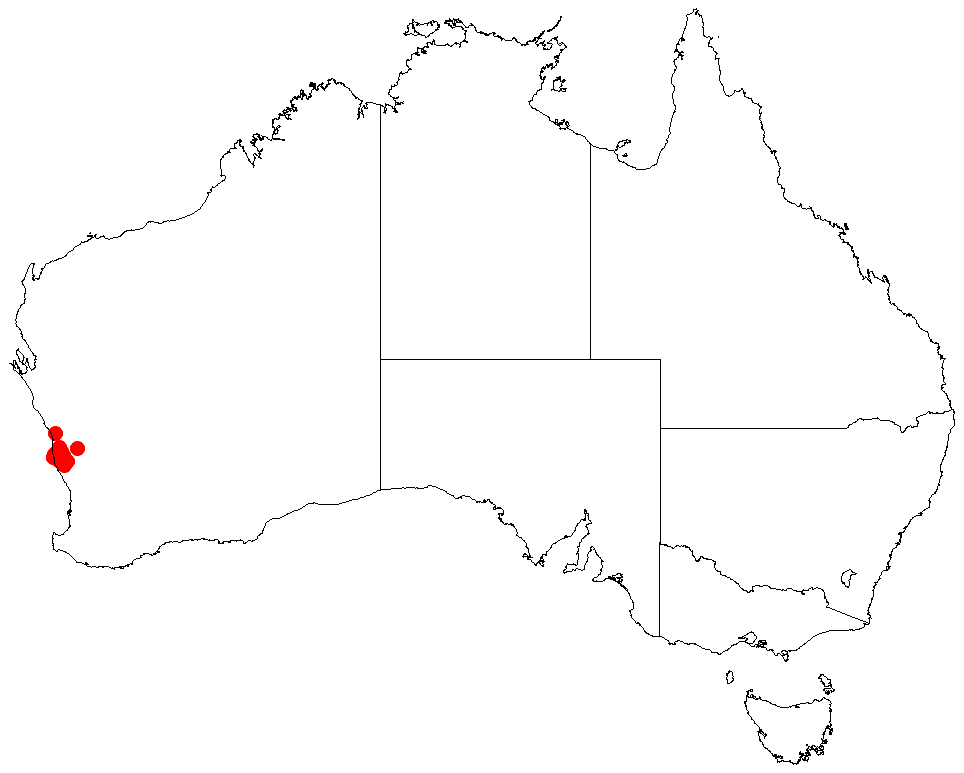
- Occurrence data from AVH

Synonyms
- Genetyllis sanguinea Meisn.

= Darwinia sanguinea =

Species of flowering plant

Darwinia sanguinea is a species of flowering plant in the myrtle family Myrtaceae and is endemic to the south-west of Western Australia. It is a prostrate, sprawling shrub that typically grows to a height of 5–20 cm (2.0–7.9 in) and has reddish purple flowers between August and December.

This species was first formally described in 1857 by Carl Meissner who gave it the name Genetyllis sanguinea in the Journal of the Proceedings of the Linnean Society, Botany from material collected near the Hill River by James Drummond. In 1865, George Bentham changed the name to Darwinia sanguinea in a later edition of the same journal. The specific epithet (sanguinea) means "blood-coloured", referring to the flowers.

This darwinia is often found on hills and sandplains between Coorow, Carnamah and Dandaragan in the Geraldton Sandplains and Swan Coastal Plain bioregions of south-western Western Australia where it grows in sandy soils over laterite.
