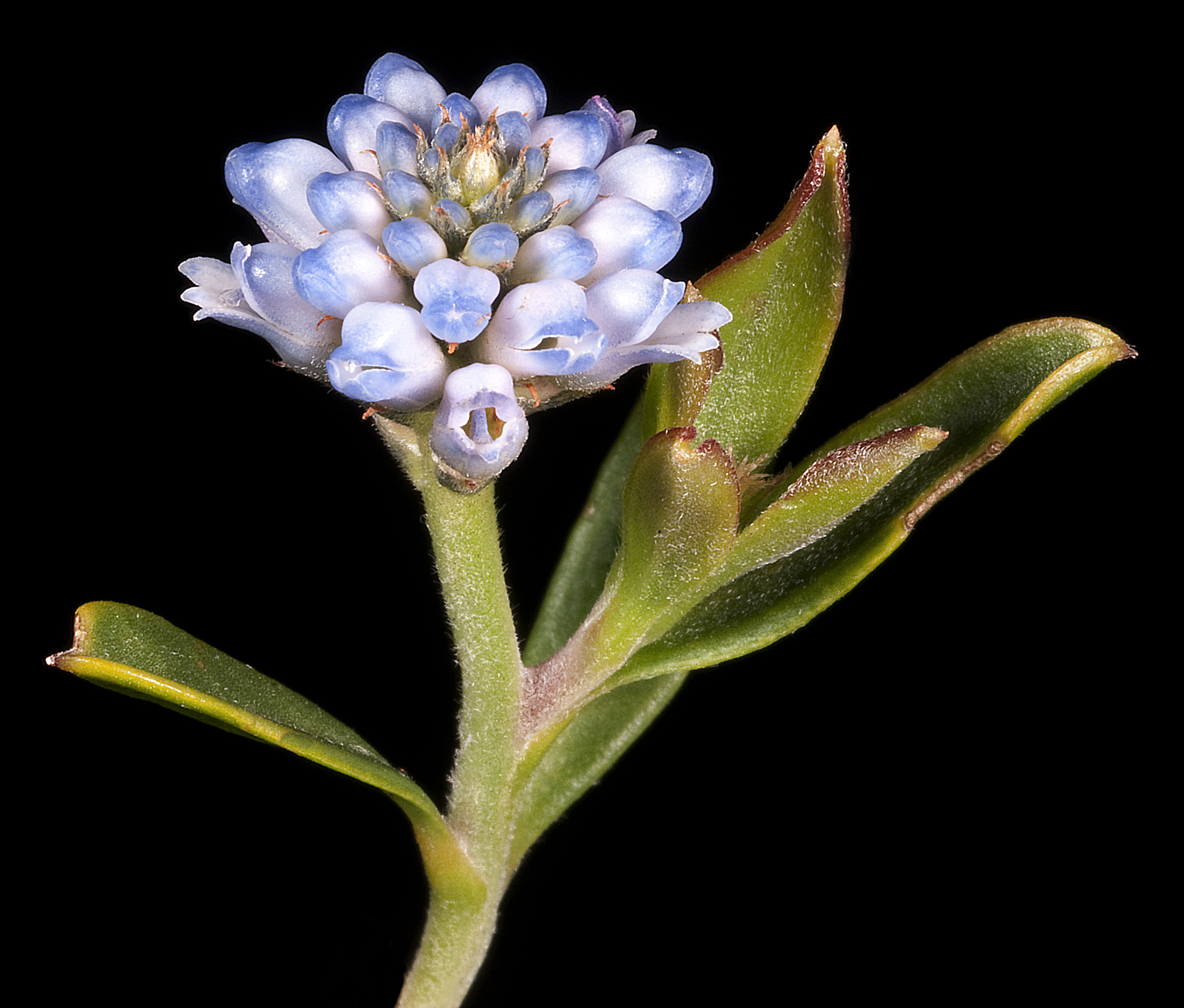

Scientific classification
- Kingdom: Plantae
- Clade: Tracheophytes
- Clade: Angiosperms
- Clade: Eudicots
- Order: Proteales
- Family: Proteaceae
- Genus: Conospermum
- Species: C. nervosum

Binomial name
- Conospermum nervosum Meisn.

Synonyms
- Conospermum diffusum Benth.; Conospermum nervosum Meisn. var. nervosum; Conospermum nervosum var. ovalifolium Meisn.; Conospermum nervosum var. subspathulatum Meisn.

= Conospermum nervosum =

Species of Australian shrub

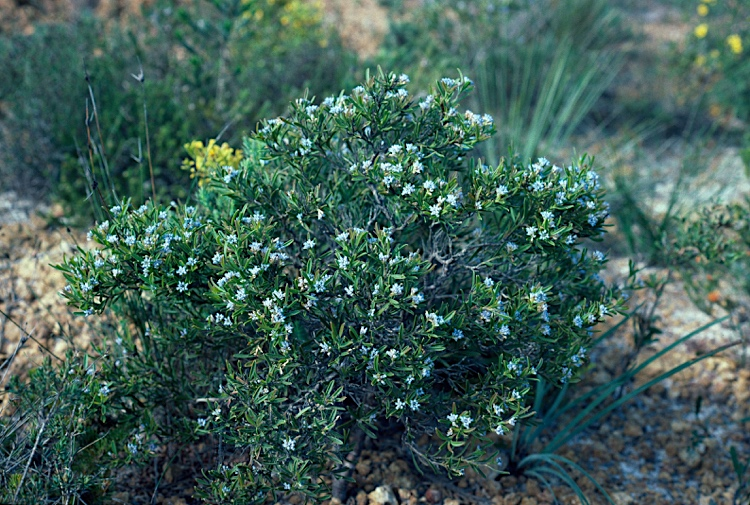
Habit near the road to Jurien Bay

Conospermum nervosum is a species of flowering plant in the family Proteaceae and is endemic to the south-west of Western Australia. It is an erect, much-branched shrub with oblong to egg-shaped leaves, and spikes of blue to pink, tube-shaped flowers.

== Description ==
Conospermum nervosum is a small, erect or spreading, multi-branched shrub that typically grows to a height of 30–60 cm (12–24 in), sometimes to 1 m (3 ft 3 in). It has oblong to egg-shaped leaves, sometimes with the narrow end towards the base, 9–55 mm (0.35–2.17 in) long and 1.5–13 mm (0.059–0.512 in) wide. The flowers are blue, rarely pale pink, arranged in a head of spikes of up to 20, the flowers forming a tube 2–3 mm (0.079–0.118 in) long. The upper lip is elliptic, 3.0–3.5 mm (0.12–0.14 in) long, 1.5–2.0 mm (0.059–0.079 in) wide, the lower lip joined for 2.8–3.5 mm (0.11–0.14 in) long with narrowly D-shaped lobes 0.5–0.75 mm (0.020–0.030 in) long and about 0.5 mm (0.020 in). Flowering mostly occurs from August to February and the fruit is a hairy, cream-coloured nut about 2 mm (0.079 in) long wide.

== Taxonomy ==
Conospermum nervosum was first formally described in 1855 by the botanist Carl Meissner in Hooker's Journal of Botany and Kew Garden Miscellany from specimens collected by James Drummond. The specific epithet (nervosum) means 'abounding in nerves', referring to the many veins in the leaves.

== Distribution and habitat ==
This species of Conospermum is found on hill slopes and sand plains along the west coast to the north of Perth between Hill River and Eneabba in the Geraldton Sandplains and Swan Coastal Plain bioregions of south-western Western Australia where it grows in sandy soils in kwongan.
