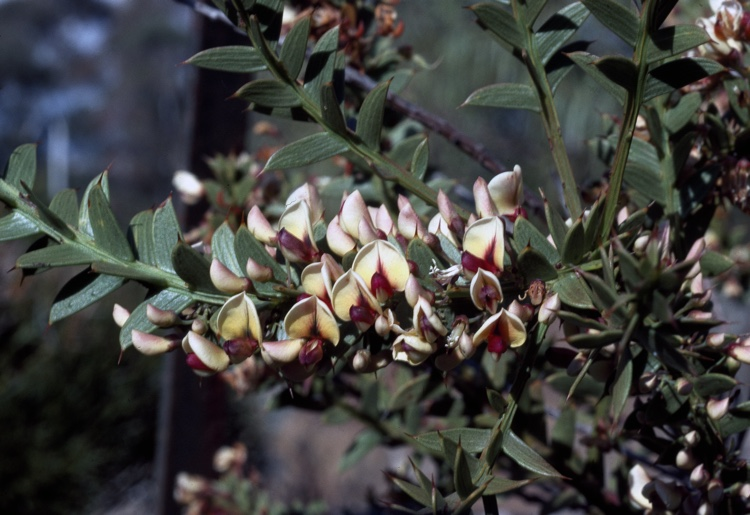
- In the Australian National Botanic Gardens

Scientific classification
- Kingdom: Plantae
- Clade: Tracheophytes
- Clade: Angiosperms
- Clade: Eudicots
- Clade: Rosids
- Order: Fabales
- Family: Fabaceae
- Subfamily: Faboideae
- Genus: Daviesia
- Species: D. chapmanii

Binomial name
- Daviesia chapmanii Crisp

= Daviesia chapmanii =

Species of flowering plant

Daviesia chapmanii is a species of flowering plant in the family Fabaceae and is endemic to the south-west of Western Australia. It is a dense, compact, rounded shrub with sharply-ridged branches, densely crowded, sharply-pointed phyllodes, and pale yellow flowers with deep pink markings.

== Description ==
Daviesia chapmanii is a dense, compact, rounded shrub that typically grows to 0.8 m (2 ft 7 in) high and 1.5 mm (0.059 in) wide, its branches with many sharp, longitudinal ridges. Its leaves are reduced to densely-crowded, oblong to triangular, sharply-pointed phyllodes mostly 10–15 mm (0.39–0.59 in) long and 2.5–4 mm (0.098–0.157 in) wide. The flowers are arranged in groups of up to four in leaf axils on a peduncle 0.5–1.5 mm (0.020–0.059 in) long, each flower on a pedicel 3.0–5.5 mm (0.12–0.22 in) long with many narrowly oblong bracts about 0.5 mm (0.020 in) long at the base. The sepals are 3.0–3.5 mm (0.12–0.14 in) long and joined at the base, the upper lobes joined for most of their length and the lower three triangular and about 0.75 mm (0.030 in) long. The flowers are pale yellow with deep pink markings, the standard broadly egg-shaped, 8.0–8.5 mm (0.31–0.33 in) long and 6–9 mm (0.24–0.35 in) wide. The wings are narrowly egg-shaped with the narrower end towards the base and 7–8 mm (0.28–0.31 in) long and the keel about 7–8 mm (0.28–0.31 in) long. Flowering mainly occurs in April and May and the fruit is an inflated, triangular pod 12–14 mm (0.47–0.55 in) long.

== Taxonomy and naming ==
Daviesia chapmanii was first formally described in 1995 by Michael Crisp in Australian Systematic Botany from specimens collected near the Hill River bridge on the Brand Highway in 1979. The specific epithet (chapmanii) honours the plant collector, Charles Chapman (1904–1988).

== Distribution and habitat ==
This species of pea grows in kwongan, mostly restricted to the area between Badgingarra, Eneabba and Carnamah in the Avon Wheatbelt and Geraldton Sandplains biogeographic regions of south-western Western Australia.

== Conservation status ==
Daviesia chapmanii is listed as "not threatened" by the Department of Biodiversity, Conservation and Attractions.
