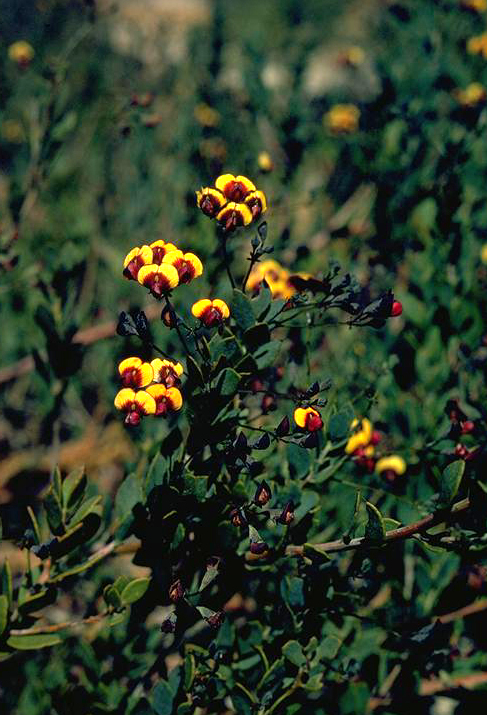
- Near the Hill River Bridge

Scientific classification
- Kingdom: Plantae
- Clade: Tracheophytes
- Clade: Angiosperms
- Clade: Eudicots
- Clade: Rosids
- Order: Fabales
- Family: Fabaceae
- Subfamily: Faboideae
- Genus: Daviesia
- Species: D. pedunculata

Binomial name
- Daviesia pedunculata Benth. ex Lindl.

Synonyms
- Daviesia pedunculata Benth. ex Lindl. var. pedunculata

= Daviesia pedunculata =

Species of flowering plant

Daviesia pedunculata is a species of flowering plant in the family Fabaceae and is endemic to south-western Western Australia. It is a spreading or sprawling to erect shrub with erect, egg-shaped to elliptic phyllodes, and yellow and maroon flowers.

== Description ==
Daviesia pedunculata is a spreading or sprawling to erect shrub that typically grows to a height of 30–60 cm (12–24 in). Its phyllodes are erect, usually egg-shaped to elliptic, mostly 10–28 mm (0.39–1.10 in) long, 2–11 mm (0.079–0.433 in) high and usually sharply-pointed. The flowers are arranged in leaf axils on a raceme of three to eight flowers, the raceme on a peduncle 12–25 mm (0.47–0.98 in) long, the rachis up to 5 mm (0.20 in) long, each flower on a pedicel 2.5–10 mm (0.098–0.394 in) long. The sepals are 5–6 mm (0.20–0.24 in) long, the upper two lobes joined for most of their length and the lower three 1.0–2.5 mm (0.039–0.098 in) long. The standard petal is broadly egg-shaped with a notched centre, 7.5–10 mm (0.30–0.39 in) long and 7–11 mm (0.28–0.43 in) wide, yellow with a maroon base around a yellow centre. The wings are about 7.0–7.5 mm (0.28–0.30 in) long and maroon, the keel 6–7 mm (0.24–0.28 in) long and maroon. Flowering occurs from July to December and the fruit is a flattened, triangular pod 15–18 mm (0.59–0.71 in) long.

== Taxonomy and naming ==
Daviesia pedunculata was first formally described in 1839 by John Lindley from an unpublished description by George Bentham. Lindley's description was published in A Sketch of the Vegetation of the Swan River Colony. The specific epithet (pedunculata) means "pedunculate".

== Distribution and habitat ==
This bitter-pea grows in heathland near Kalbarri, around Eneabba and near Perth in the Esperance Plains, Geraldton Sandplains, Jarrah Forest and Swan Coastal Plain biogeographic regions of south-western Western Australia.
