= Nambung National Park =

National park in Australia

- IUCN category II (national park)
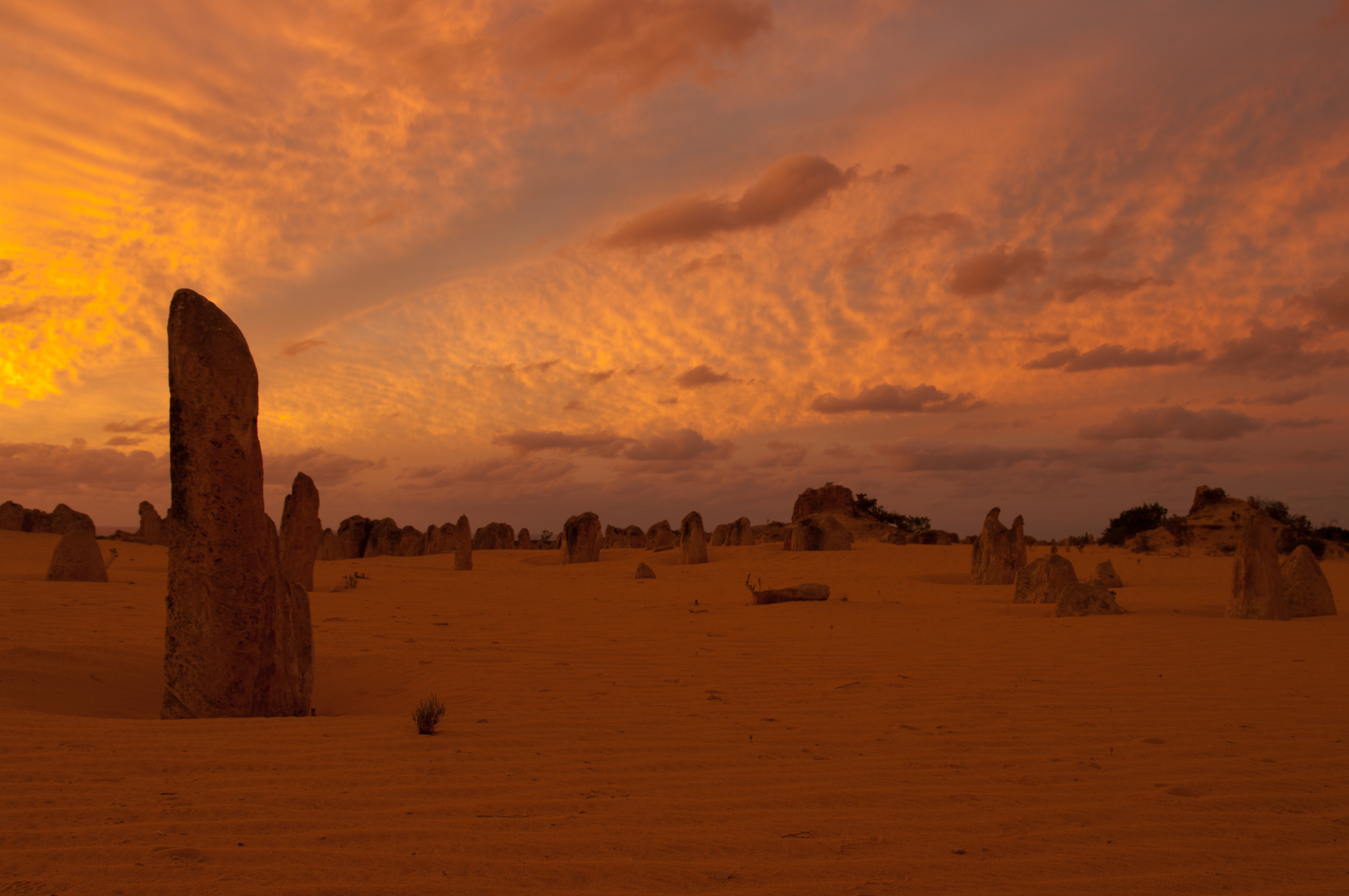
- The Pinnacles - natural limestone formations

- Location within Western Australia
- Location: Western Australia
- Nearest city: Cervantes
- Coordinates: 30°34′34″S 115°10′12″E
- Area: 192.68 km^{2} (74.39 sq mi)
- Established: 1 July 1994
- Governing body: Department of Biodiversity, Conservation and Attractions
- Website: Official website

Nambung National Park is a national park in the Wheatbelt region of Western Australia, 200 kilometres (120 mi) northwest of the state capital Perth, and 17 kilometres (11 mi) south of the small coastal town of Cervantes. The park contains the Pinnacles Desert which is an area with thousands of limestone formations called pinnacles.

The park derives its name from an indigenous Australian word possibly meaning crooked or winding. The word was used in 1938 when naming the Nambung River which flows into the park and disappears into a cave system within the limestone. The Yued people are the acknowledged traditional custodians of the land since before the arrival of Europeans.

Nambung National Park also contains beaches at Kangaroo Point and Hangover Bay, as well as coastal dunes and flowering plants in low heathland areas. A boardwalk in the northern area of the park at Lake Thetis allows visitors to view thrombolites which, like stromatolites, are structures built by micro-organisms, especially cyanobacteria. Some of the fossilized thrombolites have been dated to 3.6 billion years old. The Pinnacles Desert Discovery Centre features exhibits about the geology of the pinnacles formations and the cultural and natural heritage values of the area.

== History ==
Europeans first visited the area in 1658 when Dutch maps recorded North and South Hummocks on their maps. Phillip Parker King also mentioned the Hummocks in his journals in 1820. The Pinnacles Desert area remained relatively unknown until surveyed in 1934. The national park was created in July 1994 by combining three separate reserve areas gazetted in 1956, 1967 (the Pinnacles) and 1968.

== Geography ==
The park is bordered to the north by the Southern Beekeeper's Nature Reserve and to the south by Wanagarren Nature Reserve. A large area of vacant Crown land is found along much of the eastern boundary while the Indian Ocean defines the park's western boundary. Visitors can access the Pinnacles Desert from points north or south of Cervantes via the Indian Ocean Drive or via Cervantes Road from the east. The park is located 17 kilometres (11 mi) south of Cervantes.

== Geology ==
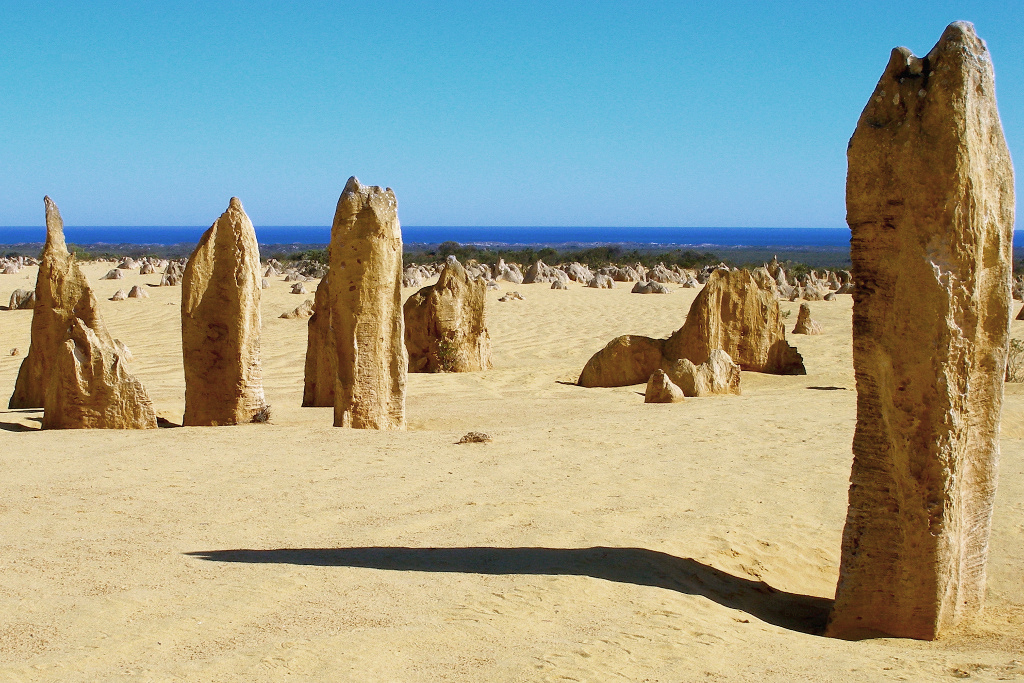
Some taller pinnacles with Indian Ocean in background

The Pinnacles Desert contains thousands of limestone pillars. The pillars are the weathered and eroded fragments of limestone beds composed of deposited marine organisms such as coral and molluscs. Some of the tallest pinnacles reach heights of up to 3.5 metres (11 ft) above the yellow sand base. The different types of formations include ones which are much taller than they are wide and resemble columns – suggesting the name of Pinnacles – while others are only a metre (3 ft 3 in) or so in height and width resembling short tombstones. A cross-bedding structure can be observed in many pinnacles where the angle of deposited sand changed suddenly due to changes in prevailing winds during formation of the limestone beds. Pinnacles with tops similar to mushrooms are created when the calcrete capping is harder than the limestone layer below it. The relatively softer lower layers weather and erode at a faster rate than the top layer leaving behind more material at the top of the pinnacle.

== Fauna and flora ==
Nambung National Park is home to a variety of wildlife with 176 observed animal species, including 128 birds, 8 mammals, 15 reptiles, several fish and arthropods and one amphibian. Among the mammal species are the western grey kangaroo, red kangaroo, dingo, honey possum and red fox. Some common bird species include silver gull, black-faced woodswallow, white-backed swallow, red-capped plover and raven. Reptile species include Buchanan's snake-eyed skink, yellow-faced whip snake, bobtail (a species of blue-tongued skink) and sand goanna. The only observed amphibian species is the sign-bearing froglet.

Humpback whales visit the Indian Ocean waters adjacent to the park during their northern and southern migration seasons, while sea lions and dolphins are year-round inhabitants.

The park's flora includes more than 170 angiosperms with a few examples being coastal wattle, sea nymph, acorn banksia, cowslip orchid, ringed wallaby grass and coast hop-bush. The only recorded gymnosperm is the swamp cypress.

== Panorama ==
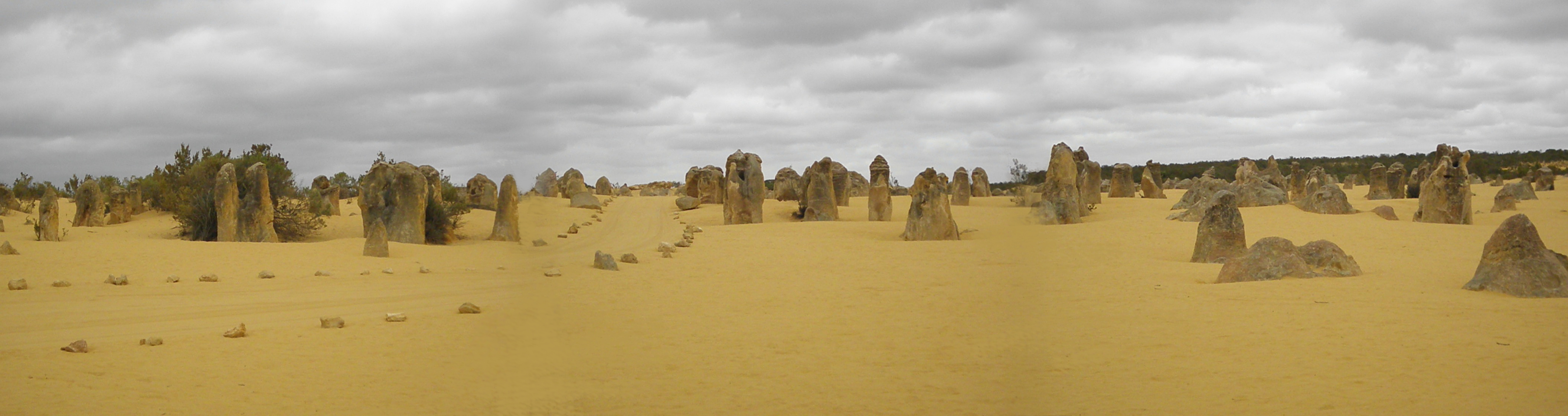
Pinnacles at Nambung National Park

== See also ==
- List of protected areas of Western Australia
- The Pinnacles Desert
