= Lake Thetis =

Lake in the Mid West of Western Australia

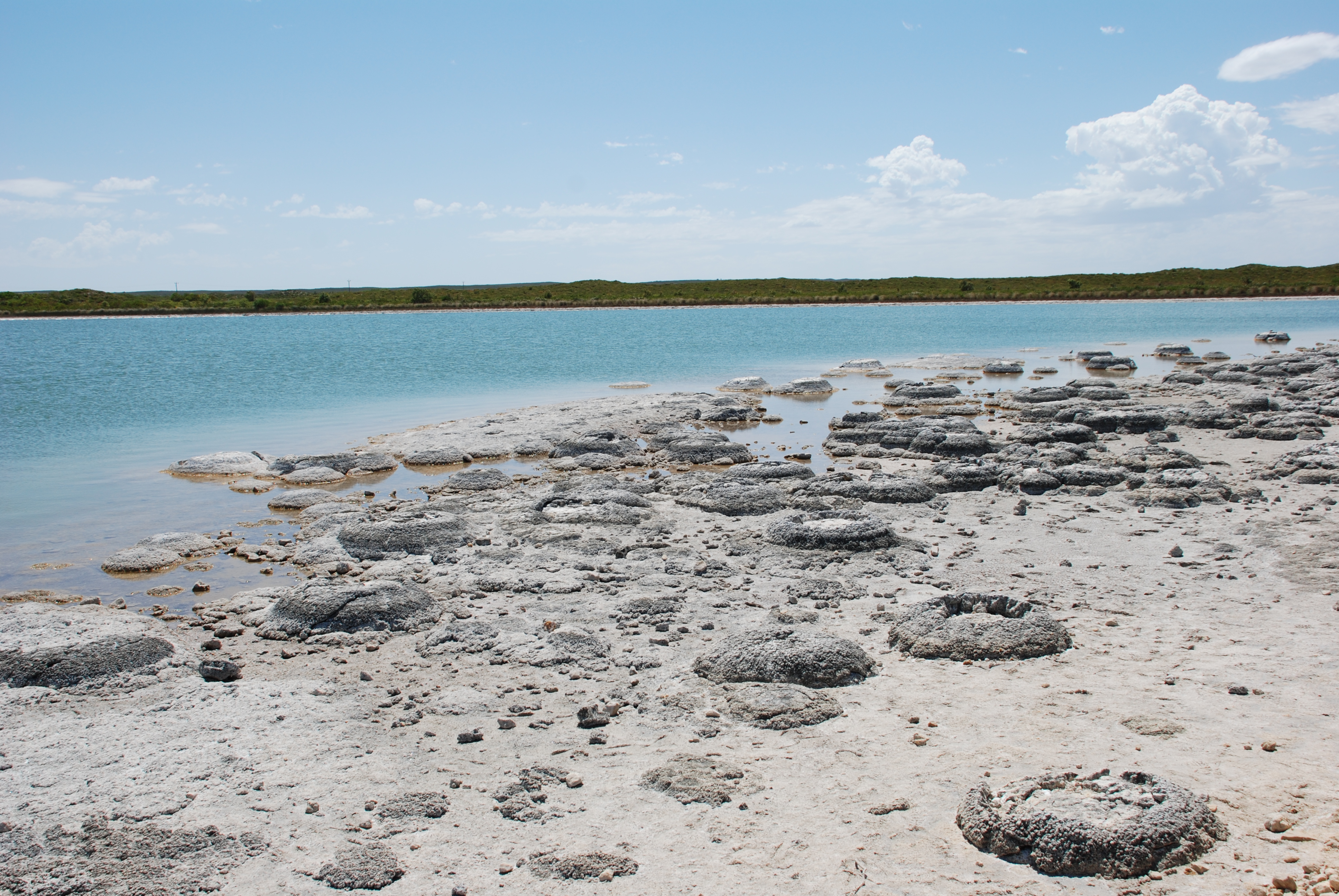
- View on Lake Thetis and stromatolites

- Location in Western Australia
- Interactive map of Lake Thetis
- Location: Mid West, Western Australia
- Coordinates: 30°30′26″S 115°04′50″E
- Type: Saline
- Basin countries: Australia
- Max. length: 0.42 km (0.26 mi)
- Max. width: 0.29 km (0.18 mi)
- Average depth: 2 m (6 ft 7 in)

Lake Thetis is a saline coastal lake in the Mid West region of Western Australia. The lake is situated east of the small town Cervantes, 2 kilometres (1.2 mi) inland from the Indian Ocean, on a Quaternary limestone pavement.

The lake is part of Nambung National Park.

== Stromatolites, algal mats and fauna ==
The lake is one of only a few places in the world with living marine stromatolites. The Lake Thetis stromatolites exhibit unusual columnar branching. These narrow, closely spaced and almost parallel columns are extremely rare in modern stromatolites.

Alongside the stromatolites, a diverse array of benthic microbial communities, such as algal mats, inhabit various layers of the lake. Some of these algal mats are associated with the stromatolites while most confine themselves to a particular area such as the high foreshore areas, splash zone or the central basin of the lake.

The lake water is alkaline and nutrient poor but provides an ideal environment for bottom dwelling microbial communities. The lake contains some small fish, amphipods and a few crustacean species adapted to living in highly saline environments.

The stromatolite community is threatened by nutrient enrichment and physical crushing. An interim recovery plan is currently being written which will provide direction to further protect this extremely valuable community for future generations.

== Recent development ==
In March 2008, a new entry road and car park, as well as walkways on the shore of the lake were constructed. There is also a 1.5 kilometres (0.93 mi) walk trail around the lake. Additionally, a disused rubbish pit on the northern side of the lake is being rehabilitated and this has eliminated threats associated with rubbish disposal.

== See also ==
- List of lakes of Australia § Western Australia
