= Kurkar =

Regional name for an aeolian quartz calcrete on the Levantine coast

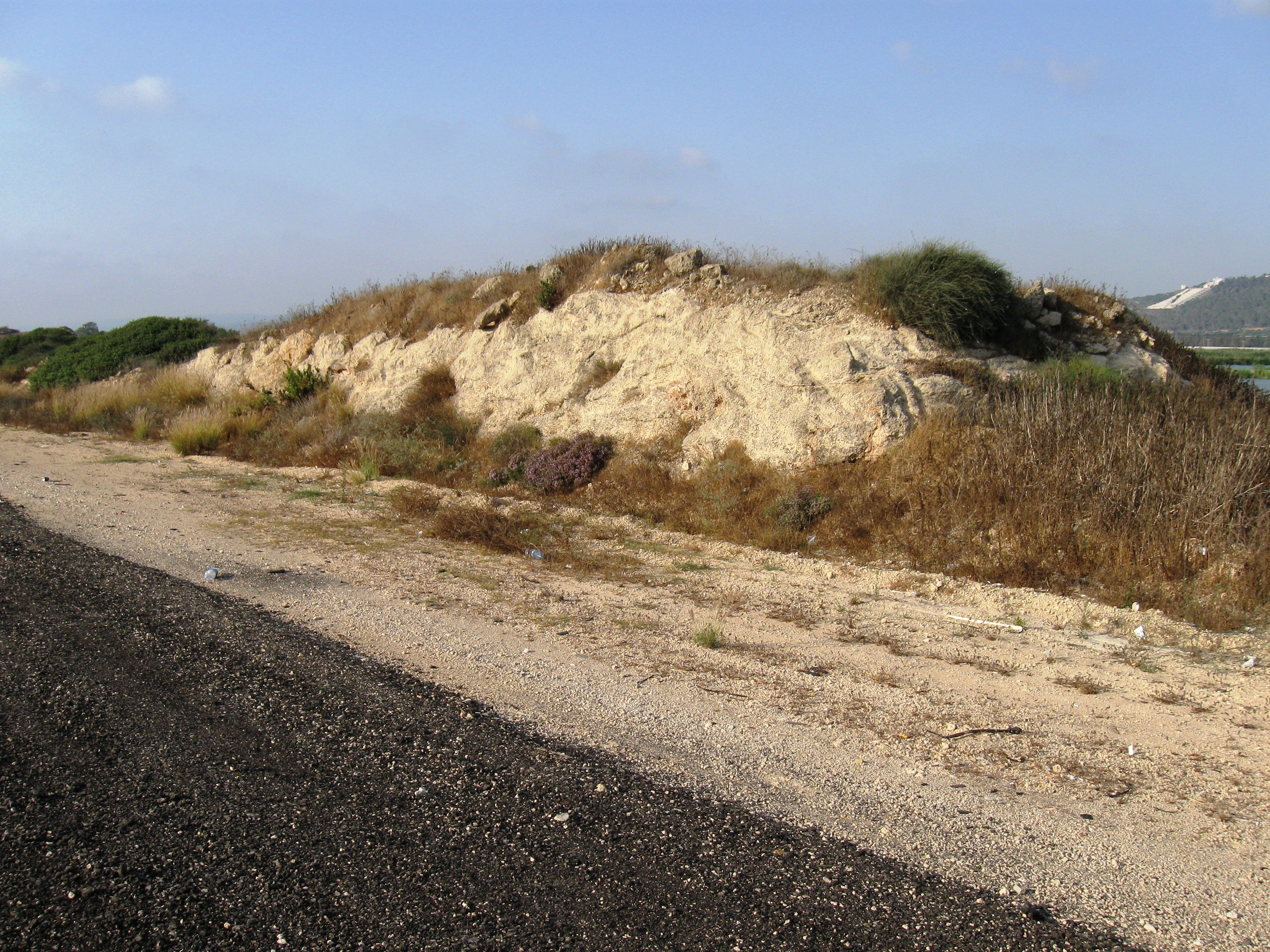
A kurkar ridge near Zikhron Ya'akov, Israel

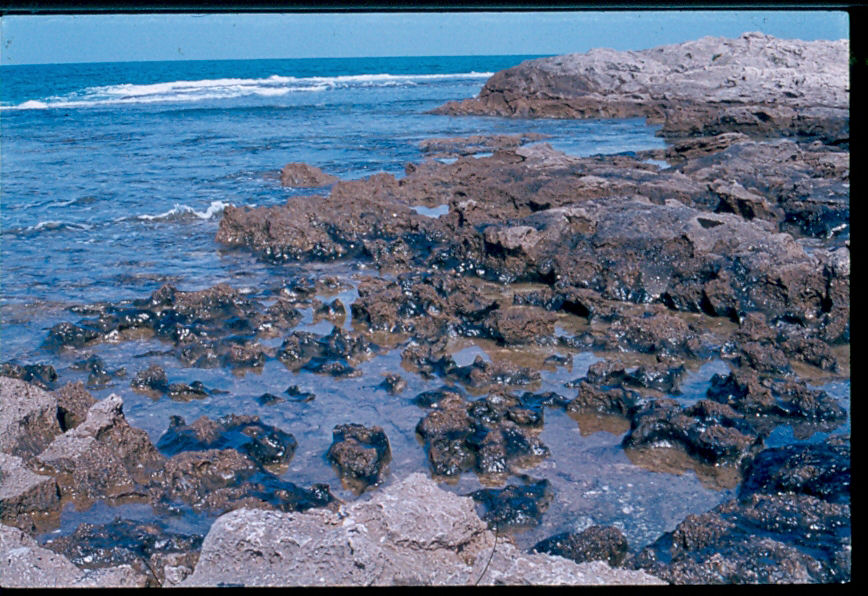
Exposed kurkar at Tel Dor beach

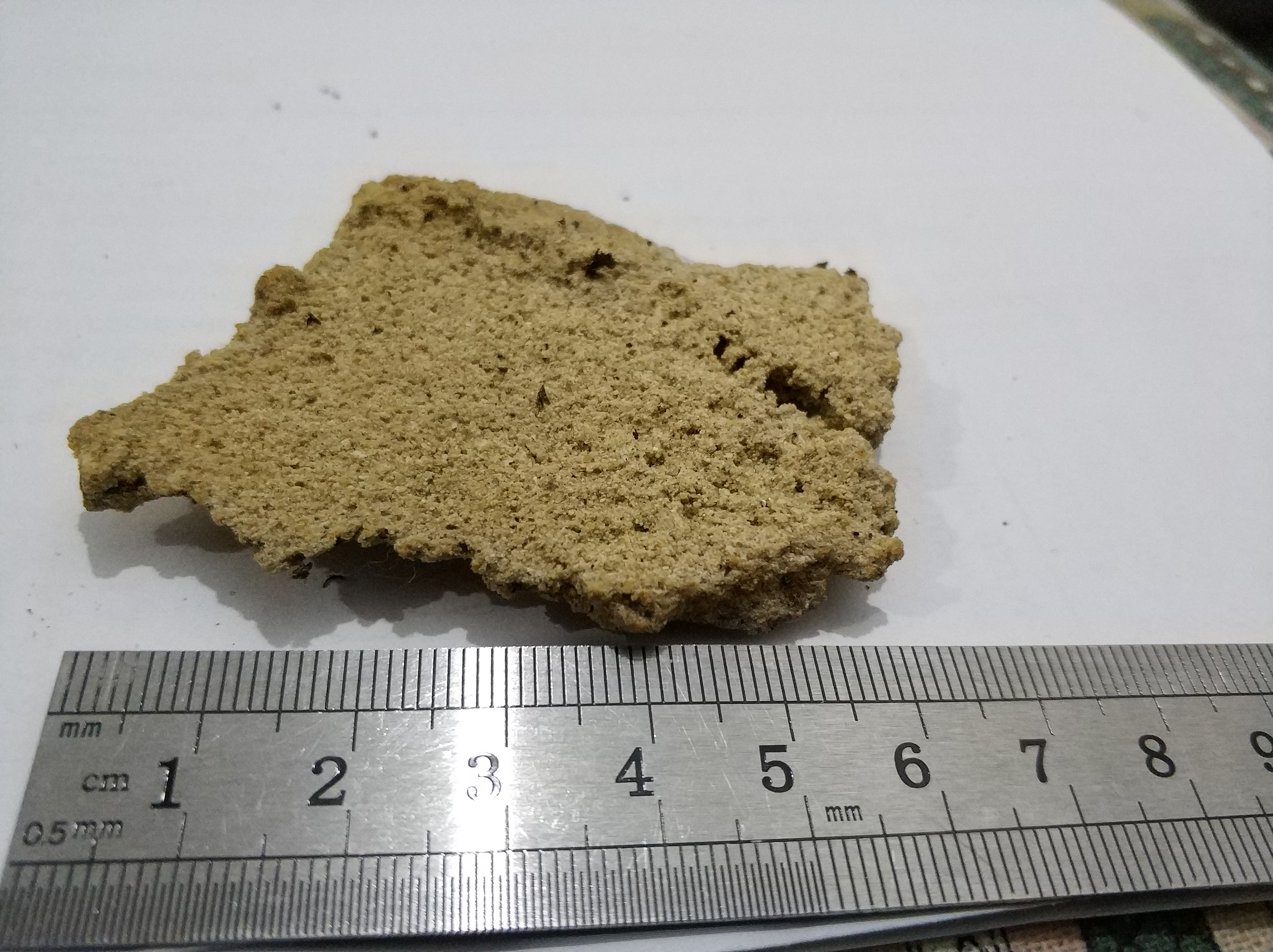
Kurkar stone close up. The small grains of sand can be seen

Kurkar (Arabic: كركار /Hebrew: כורכר) is the term used in Arabic and modern Hebrew for the rock type of which lithified sea sand dunes consist. The equivalent term used in Lebanon is ramleh.

== History ==
Kurkar is the regional name for an aeolian quartz sandstone with carbonate cement, in other words an eolianite or a calcarenite (calcareous sandstone or grainstone), found on the Levantine coast of the Mediterranean Sea in Turkey, Syria, Lebanon, Israel, the Gaza Strip and northern Sinai Peninsula. The kurkar ridges are prevalent on Israel's coast from the area of Tel Aviv northwards. South of Mount Carmel they form parallel alignments, the result of transgressive coastlines. Kurkar is the product of windblown quartzitic sands which created dunes during the Pleistocene, which were cemented by carbonates transforming them to sandstone (lithification process), forming successive ridges along the shore. Kurkar occurs on the shore as well as under the current sea level, on the continental shelf. There are three underwater sandstone ridges off the coast of Israel and two on land. The younger kurkar formations also build small islands or islets along the coast of Israel, Lebanon (at Sidon and near Tripoli), and Syria (Arwad). In the Gaza Strip, coastal plain kurkar deposits of medium to coarse-grained calcareous sandstone are characterized by crossbedding.

Israel's coastal sand dunes, the habitat of many rare species of plants and animals, are made of kurkar interspersed with hamra, red sandy loam. Until the beginning of the 20th century, Palestine (then under the Ottoman Empire) had 285 square kilometers of kurkar and hamra formations. Due to construction, farming and the use of off-road vehicles, this has diminished to 109 square kilometers.

== Biology ==
Kurkar ridges in Israel provide nesting sites for an endangered species of bird, the European bee-eater; and nine species of wild plants native only to Israel, such as the coastal iris. Among the dominant plants on the kurkar ridge are lentisk (Pistacia lentiscus) and headed thyme (Coridothymus capitatus). The rare plants include French lavender (Lavandula stoechas) with its purple blooms, Paronychia palaestina and Galilee sea-lavender (Limonium galilaeum).

In May 2009, an offshore pilot study was conducted in the northern Galilee by a team of scientists collecting geological, geophysical, geochemical and biological data in the vicinity of the Bustan Hagalil kurkar ridge. The ridge was mapped during the National Bathymetric Survey of Israel by multibeam sonar.

== See also ==
- Wildlife in Israel
- Geography of Israel
- Jerusalem stone
- Eolianite
