= Tamala Limestone =

Limestone deposits in Western Australia

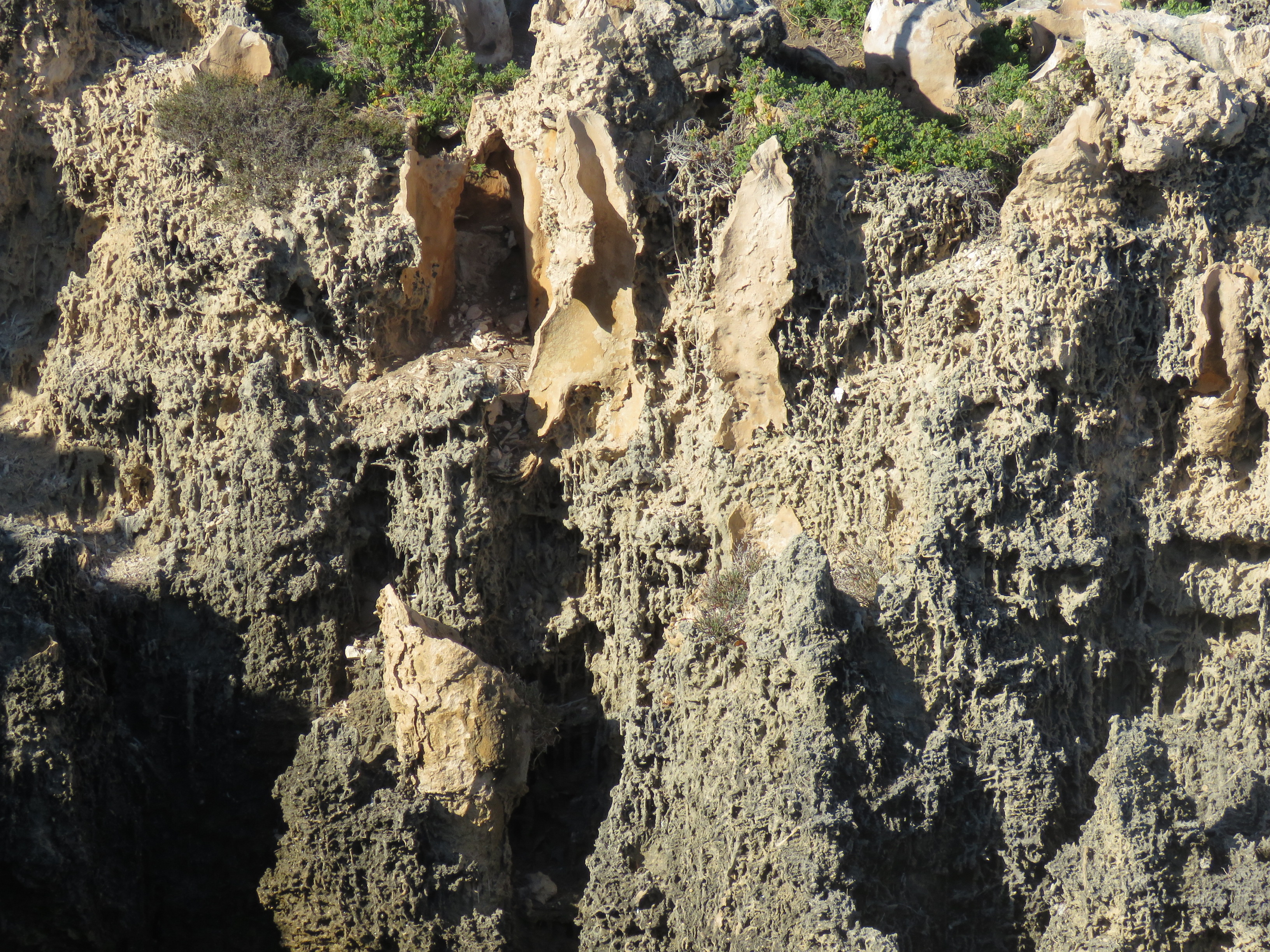
Tamala Limestone of the Henderson Cliffs in Beeliar Regional Park

Tamala Limestone is the geological name given to the widely occurring eolianite limestone deposits on the western coastline of Western Australia, between Shark Bay in the north and nearly to Albany in the south. The rock consists of calcarenite wind-blown shell fragments and quartz sand which accumulated as coastal sand dunes during the middle and late Pleistocene and early Holocene eras. As a result of a process of sedimentation and water percolating through the shelly sands, the mixture later lithified when the lime content dissolved to cement the grains together.

Exposed limestone formations at The Pinnacles Desert near Cervantes clearly show the limestone formation through the sedimentary process. At its thickest, the Tamala Limestone comprises the massive Zuytdorp Cliffs, up to 250 m high, extending for 150 km between Kalbarri, Western Australia and south of Steep Point.

== Commercial uses ==
Because of its ready availability, Tamala Limestone is used extensively for landscaping and building in Western Australia and particularly for the main population centre of Perth.

The two main sub-types quarried commercially are Carabooda Limestone and Moore River Limestone. The Carabooda type is from the Wanneroo/Yanchep region close to Perth. It has a creamier colour and is slightly denser than Moore River limestone which comes from the area around Guilderton and which is darker and more textured.

== Usage ==
A very selective list from a 1984 publication from the Geological Survey of Western Australia.

- Perth Mint
- Old Perth Boys School
- Old Perth Fire Station
- Perth Gaol and Courthouse
- Swan Barracks
- St Mary's Cathedral, Perth
- Winthrop Hall

== See also ==
- List of types of limestone
