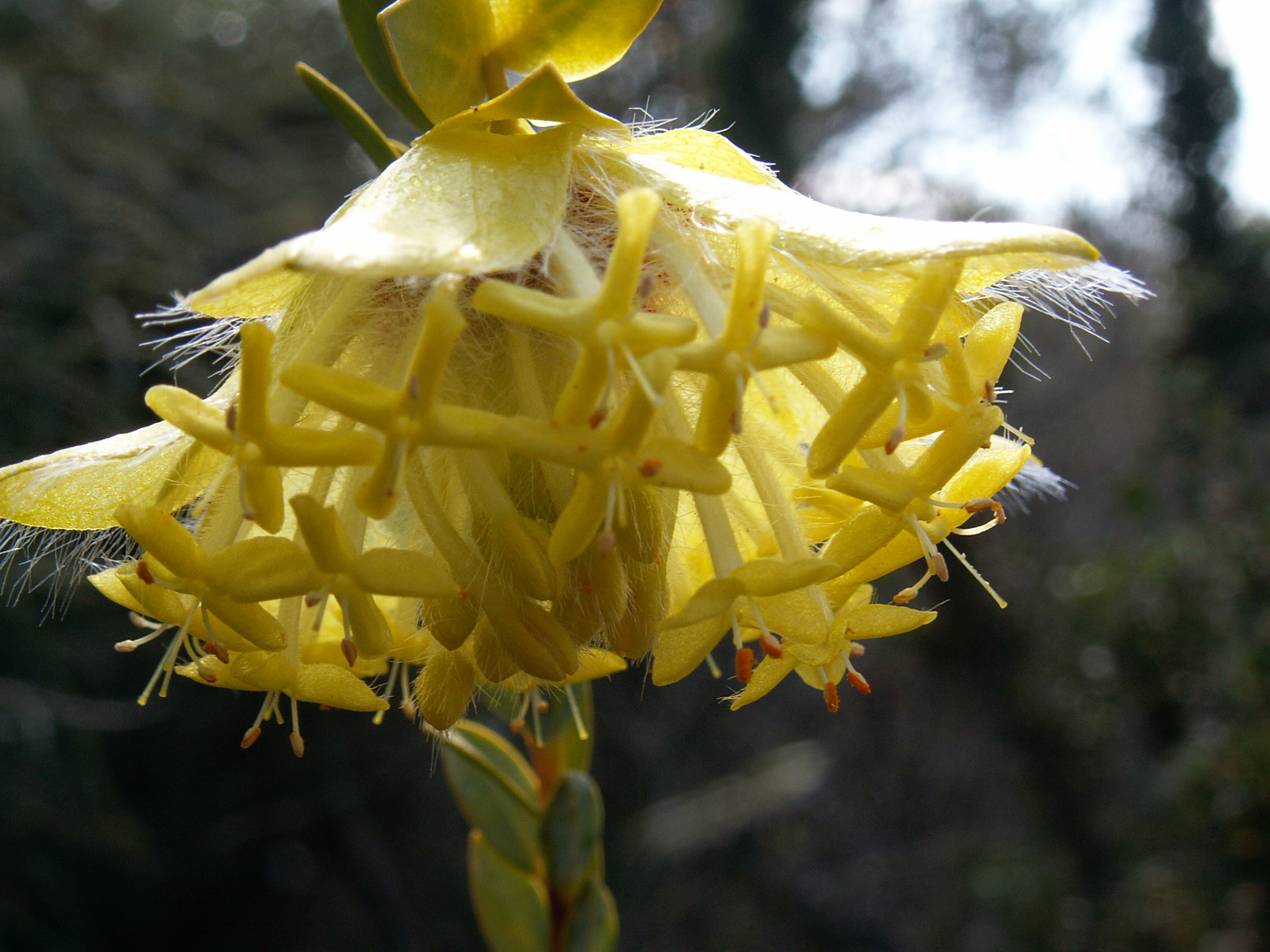
- Pimelea suaveolens subsp. suaveolens near Albany

Scientific classification
- Kingdom: Plantae
- Clade: Tracheophytes
- Clade: Angiosperms
- Clade: Eudicots
- Clade: Rosids
- Order: Malvales
- Family: Thymelaeaceae
- Genus: Pimelea
- Species: P. suaveolens

Binomial name
- Pimelea suaveolens Meisn.

Synonyms
- Calyptrostegia suaveolens (Meisn.) Endl.

= Pimelea suaveolens =

Scented banjine

Species of shrub

Pimelea suaveolens, commonly known as scented banjine, is a slender shrub with large, rather hairy yellow inflorescences. It occurs in forest areas of the south-west of Western Australia from New Norcia to Albany.

== Description ==
Pimelea suaveolens is an erect, spindly, often multi-stemmed shrub which grows to a height of 0.25–1.2 m (0.8–4 ft). The stems and leaves are glabrous and the leaves are arranged in opposite pairs, sword-shaped and 10–30 mm (0.4–1 in) long. The inflorescences are 30–40 mm (1–2 in) across and consist of many pale to deep yellow flowers surrounded by hairy, petal-like bracts and hang from the branches. Flowering occurs from June to October.

== Taxonomy ==
Pimelea suaveolens was first formally described in 1845 by Carl Meissner and the description was published in Lehmann's Plantae Preissianae from a specimen collected by James Drummond at Greenmount in 1839. The Latin specific epithet suaveolens means "sweet-smelling".

In 1988, Barbara Rye named two subspecies of P. suaveolens in the journal Nuytsia and the names are accepted at the Australian Plant Census:

- Pimelea suaveolens subsp. flava Rye that has green leaves;
- Pimelea suaveolens Meisn. subsp. suaveolens that has glaucous leaves.

== Distribution and habitat ==
Scented banjine grows on sand, sandy clay, gravel and laterite on undulating plains, flats, ridges and roadsides. It grows between New Norcia and Albany in the Coolgardie, Avon Wheatbelt, Esperance Plains, Geraldton Sandplains, Mallee, Swan Coastal Plain, Jarrah Forest and Warren biogeographic regions.

== Conservation status ==
Pimelea suaveolens is classified by the Western Australian Government Department of Biodiversity, Conservation and Attractions as "not threatened".

== Use in horticulture ==
This species is not difficult to propagate from cuttings but is difficult to maintain in cultivation. "Good drainage and partial shade are important."
