= The Pinnacles (Western Australia) =

Iimestone formation in Western Australia

Coordinates: 30°36.35′S 115°9.45′E

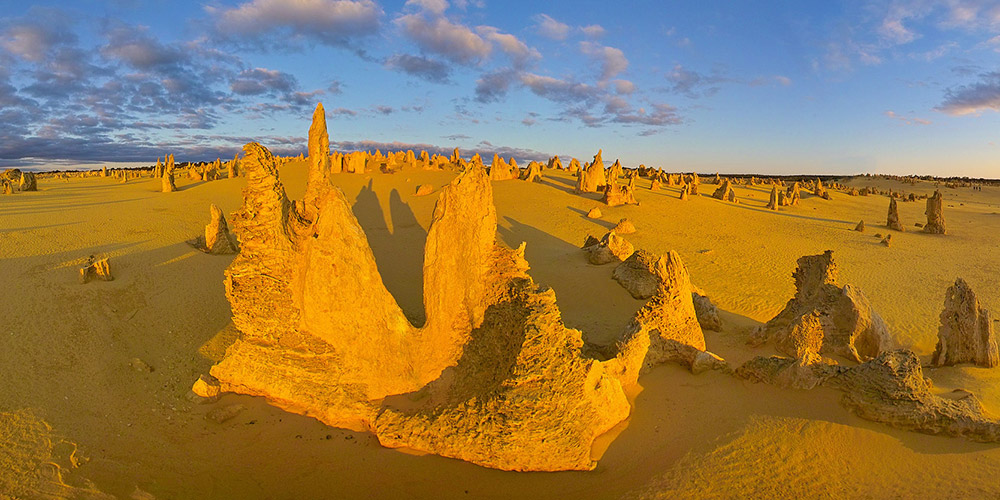
The Pinnacles, Western Australia

The Pinnacles are limestone formations within Nambung National Park, near the town of Cervantes, Western Australia.

The area contains thousands of weathered yellow limestone pillars. Some of the tallest pinnacles reach heights of up to 3.5 metres (11 ft) above the yellow sand base. The different types of formations include ones which are much taller than they are wide and resemble columns – suggesting the name of Pinnacles – while others are only a metre (3 ft 3 in) or so in height and width resembling short tombstones. A cross-bedding structure can be observed in many pinnacles where the angle of deposited sand changed suddenly due to changes in prevailing winds during formation of the limestone beds. Pinnacles with tops similar to mushrooms are created when the calcrete capping is harder than the limestone layer below it. The relatively softer lower layers weather and erode at a faster rate than the top layer leaving behind more material at the top of the pinnacle.

== Formation ==
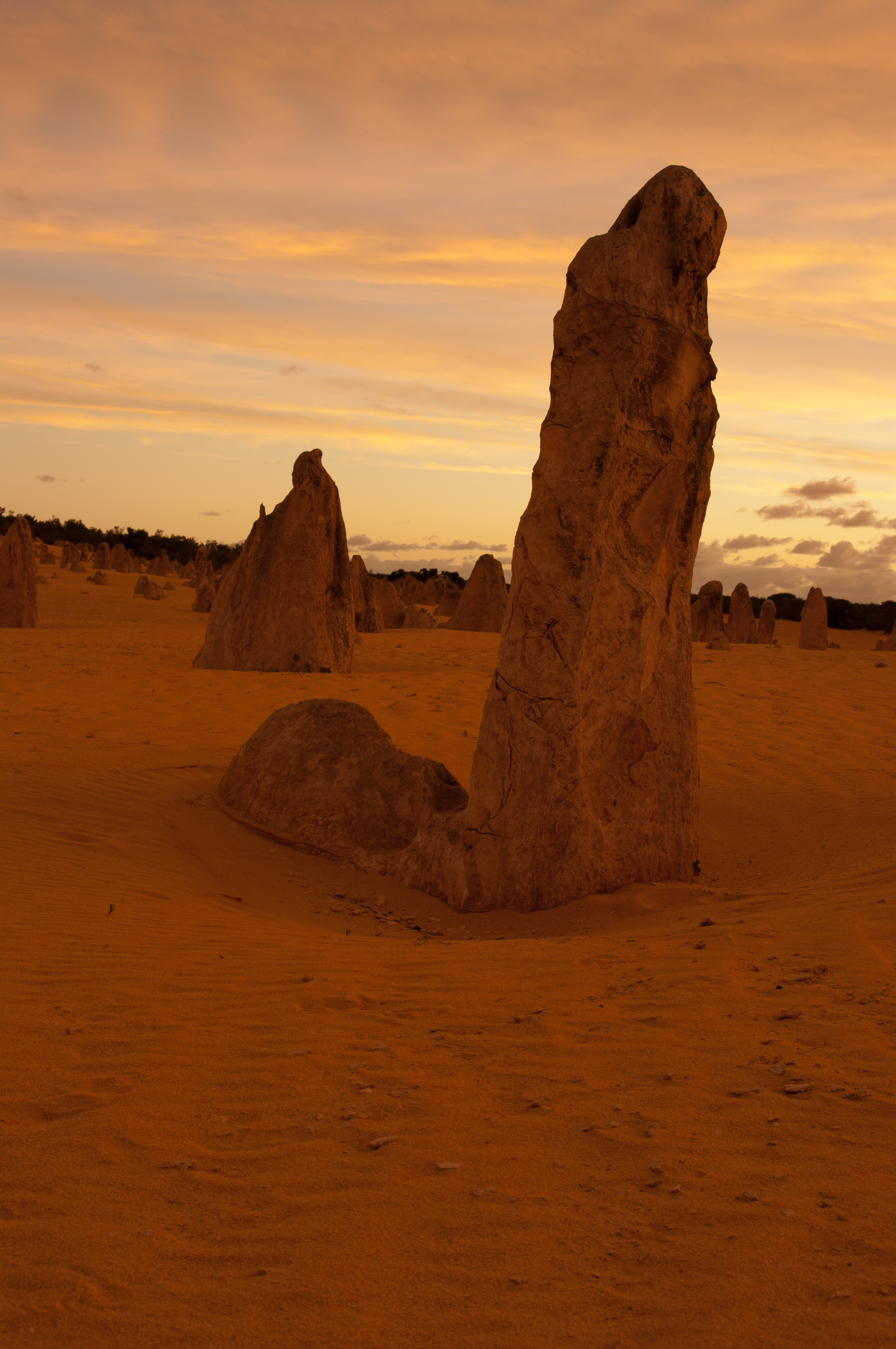
The Pinnacles during sunset

The material for the limestone of the Pinnacles came from seashells in an earlier era that was rich in marine life. These shells were broken down into lime-rich sands that were blown inland to form high mobile dunes. However, the manner in which such raw materials formed the Pinnacles is the subject of debate. Three major theories have been proposed:

The first theory states that they were formed as dissolutional remnants of the Tamala Limestone, i.e. that they formed as a result of a period of extensive solutional weathering (karstification). Focused solution initially formed small solutional depressions, mainly solution pipes, which were progressively enlarged over time, resulting in the pinnacle topography. Some pinnacles represent cemented void infills (microbialites and/or re-deposited sand), which are more resistant to erosion, but dissolution still played the final role in pinnacle development.

A second theory states that they were formed through the preservation of tree casts buried in coastal aeolianites, where roots became groundwater conduits, resulting in the precipitation of indurated (hard) calcrete. Subsequent wind erosion of the aeolianite then exposed the calcrete pillars.

A third theory suggests that plants played an active role in the creation of the Pinnacles, based on the mechanism that formed smaller "root casts" in other parts of the world. As transpiration drew water through the soil to the roots, nutrients and other dissolved minerals flowed toward the root – a process termed "mass-flow" that can result in the accumulation of nutrients at the surface of the root, if the nutrients arrive in quantities greater than that needed for plant growth. In coastal aeolian sands that consist of large amounts of calcium (derived from marine shells), the movement of water to the roots would drive the flow of calcium to the root surface. This calcium accumulates at high concentrations around the roots and over time is converted into a calcrete. When the roots die, the space occupied by the root is subsequently also filled with a carbonate material derived from the calcium in the former tissue of the roots, and possibly also from water leaching through the structures. Although evidence has been provided for this mechanism in the formation of root casts in South Africa, evidence is still required for its role in the formation of the Pinnacles.

== Flora and fauna ==
Western grey kangaroos graze on the vegetation in the park, usually in the early morning. The kangaroos are considered quite tame, sometimes allowing quiet, slow-moving visitors to approach them. Baudin's black cockatoos and emus are frequently observed in the park. Reptiles such as bobtails, sand goannas and carpet pythons are a few of the other park inhabitants.

Some of the common plant species include panjang (a low-lying wattle), coastal wattle and banjine, quandong, yellow tailflower, thick-leaved fanflower and cockies tongues. Parrot bush, candlestick banksia, firewood banksia and acorn banksia are also common in the park.

== Tourism ==
The Pinnacles remained unknown to most Australians until 1967 when the area was gazetted as a reserve, which was later combined with two adjacent reserves to form Nambung National Park in 1994.

Nambung National Park received about 150,000 visitors a year as of 2011. The Pinnacles Desert Discovery Centre was opened in 2008, offering interpretive displays of the park, both the natural processes that formed the Pinnacles and the biodiversity of the area.

The best season to visit the Pinnacles is in the months of August to October, as the days are mild and wildflowers, along with wattle, begin to bloom in the spring.

No lodging or camping areas are available within Nambung National Park but accommodations can be found in Cervantes.

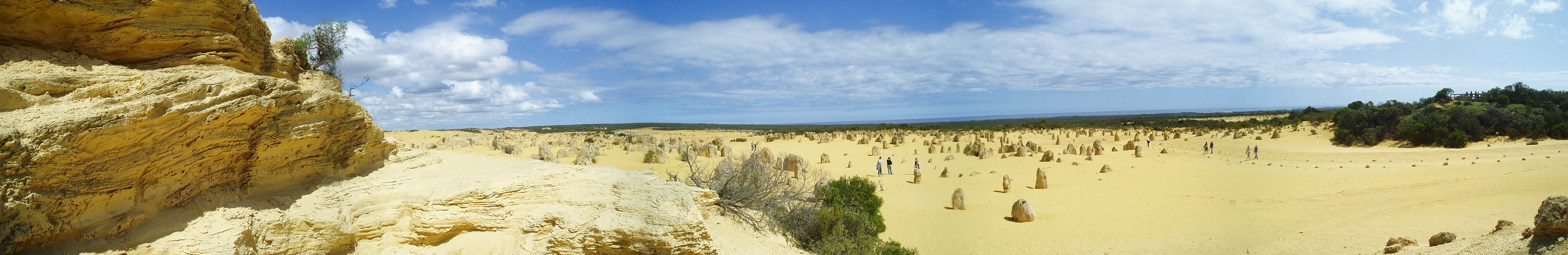
Panorama of the Pinnacles Desert
