= Eolianite =

Type of sedimentary rock

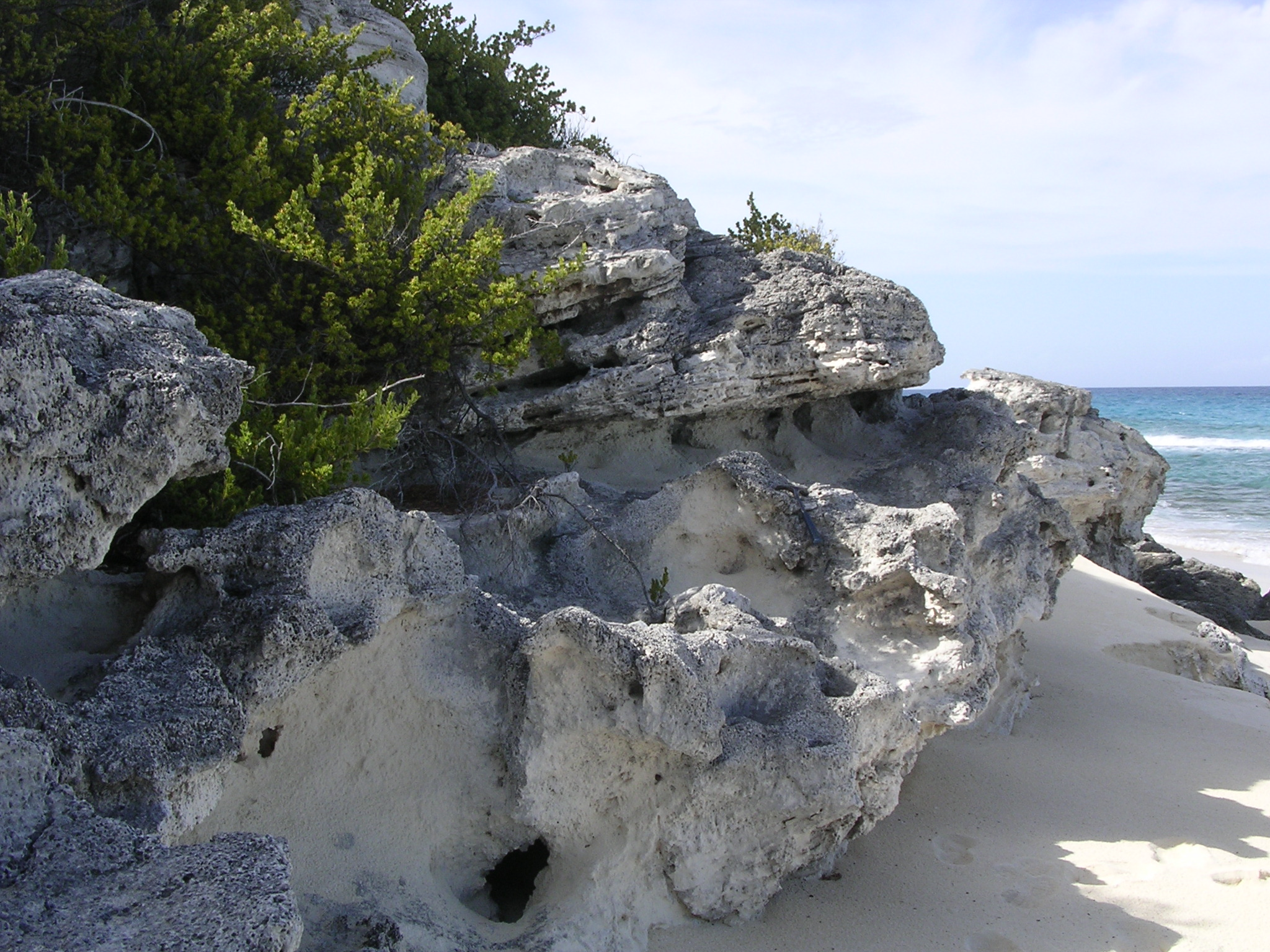
Holocene eolianite on Long Island, Bahamas.

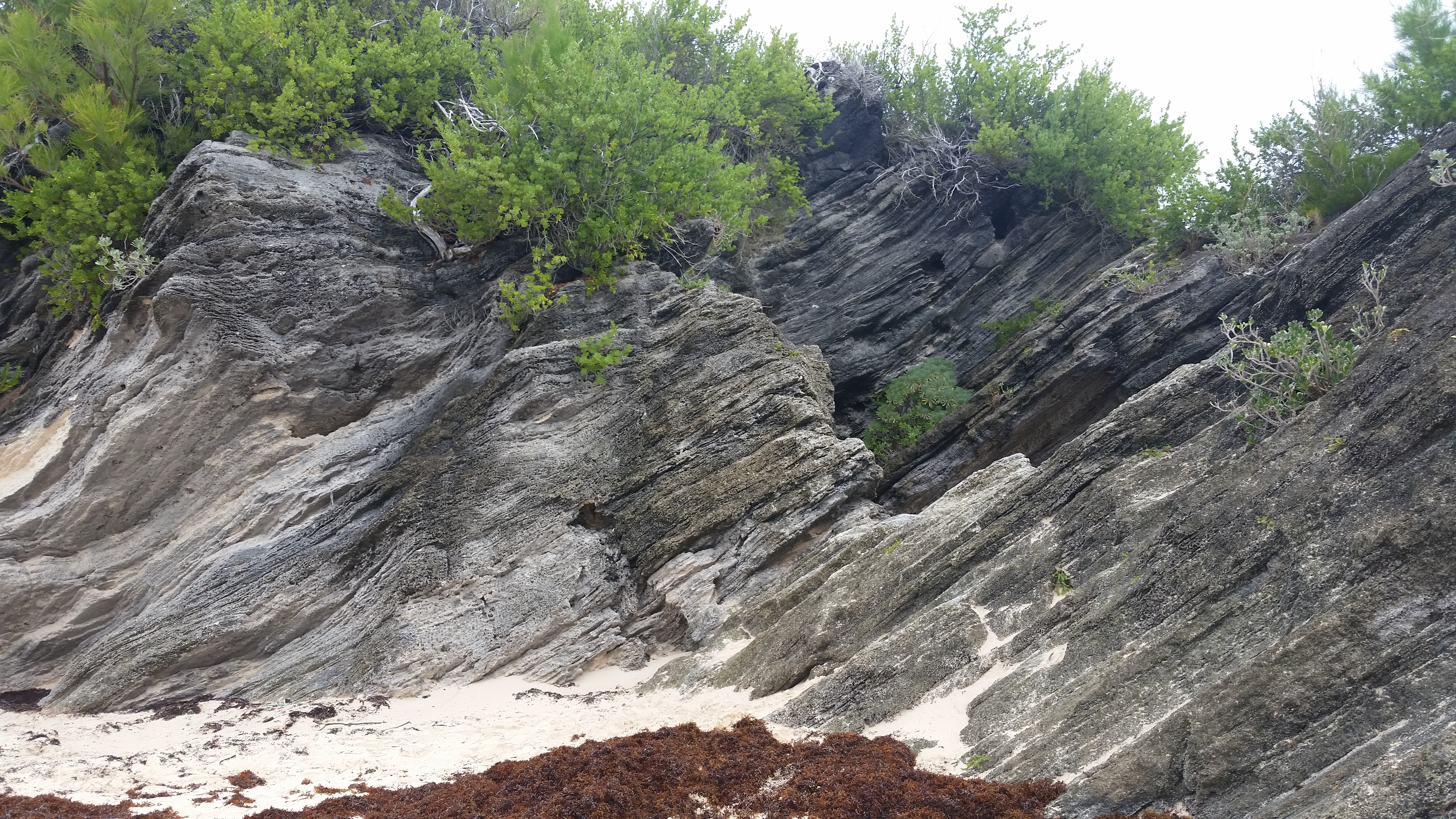
Eolianite, Horseshoe Bay, Bermuda

Eolianite or aeolianite is any rock formed by the lithification of sediment deposited by aeolian processes; that is, the wind. In common use, however, the term refers specifically to the most common form of eolianite: coastal limestone consisting of carbonate sediment of shallow marine biogenic origin, formed into coastal dunes by the wind, and subsequently lithified. It is also known as kurkar in the Middle East, miliolite in India and Arabia, and grès dunaire in the eastern Mediterranean. eolianite has a hardness of 4.3 and is very dull. Streak is light brown.

== Description ==
Sayles coined the term in 1931, when he described the dune-shaped hills of Bermuda, consisting of bioclastic grainstones. Thus, Bermuda is considered the type locality for carbonate eolianite facies, with clearly defined cross-bedding, foresets, and topsets. Deposition is controlled by glacio-eustatic changes, with eolianites forming during interglaciations. Eolianites occur along the margins of the global carbonate belt, on the carbonate islands along northeastern Yucatan, and Rottnest Island.

Eolianite occurs in many parts of the world. It occurs most extensively between the latitudes of 20° and 40° in both hemispheres, with little nearer the equator, and virtually no deposits nearer the poles. There is no apparent difference in distribution between the hemispheres, but if the extent and thickness of deposits are taken into account, the Southern Hemisphere has the bulk of eolianite.

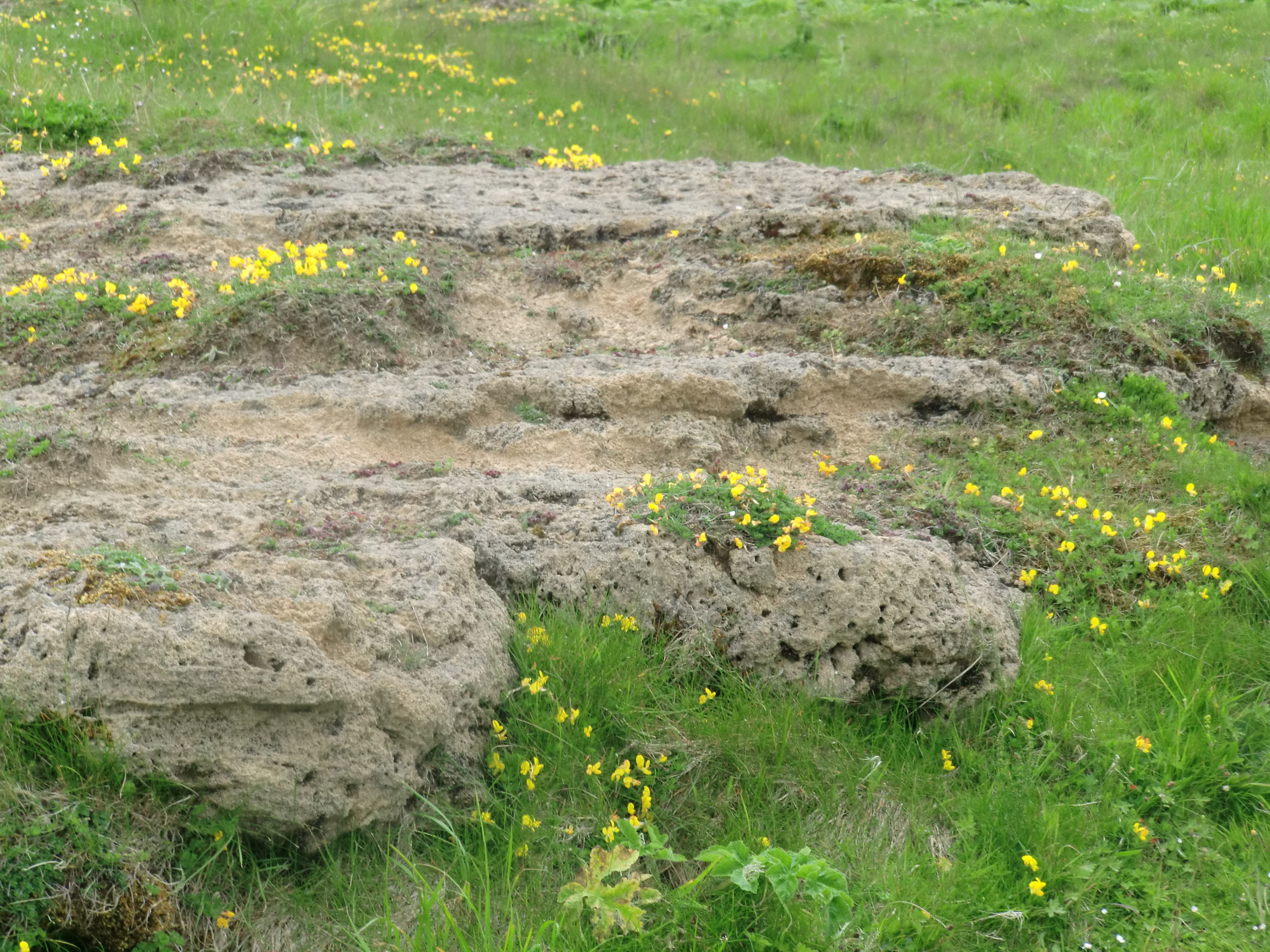
Eolianite outcrop at Aikerness on the island of Orkney, Scotland

Conditions favourable for formation of eolianite are:

- a warm climate, favourable to the production of carbonate by shallow marine animals; for example, the production of seashells by marine molluscs;
- onshore winds to form beached sediment into dunes;
- a relatively low onshore topography, rather than onshore cliffs, to allow the formation of dune systems;
- relatively low onshore rainfall, to promote rapid lithification;
- tectonic stability;

The most extensive deposits of eolianite in the world are located on the southern and western coasts of Australia. On the west coast, there are over 800 kilometres (500 mi) of eolianite cliffs, which are over 150 metres thick in some places. These cliffs, locally known as the Tamala Limestone Formation, contain layers of dune origin interspersed with layers of shallow-marine origin. Other substantial deposits occur in Bermuda, the Bahamas, the southern and eastern coasts of South Africa, the Mediterranean, India, and oceanic islands of the Pacific, Atlantic, and Indian Oceans.

== See also ==
- Depositional environment
- Facies
- Sedimentary rock
