= Cervantes, Western Australia =

Cervantes
- Town
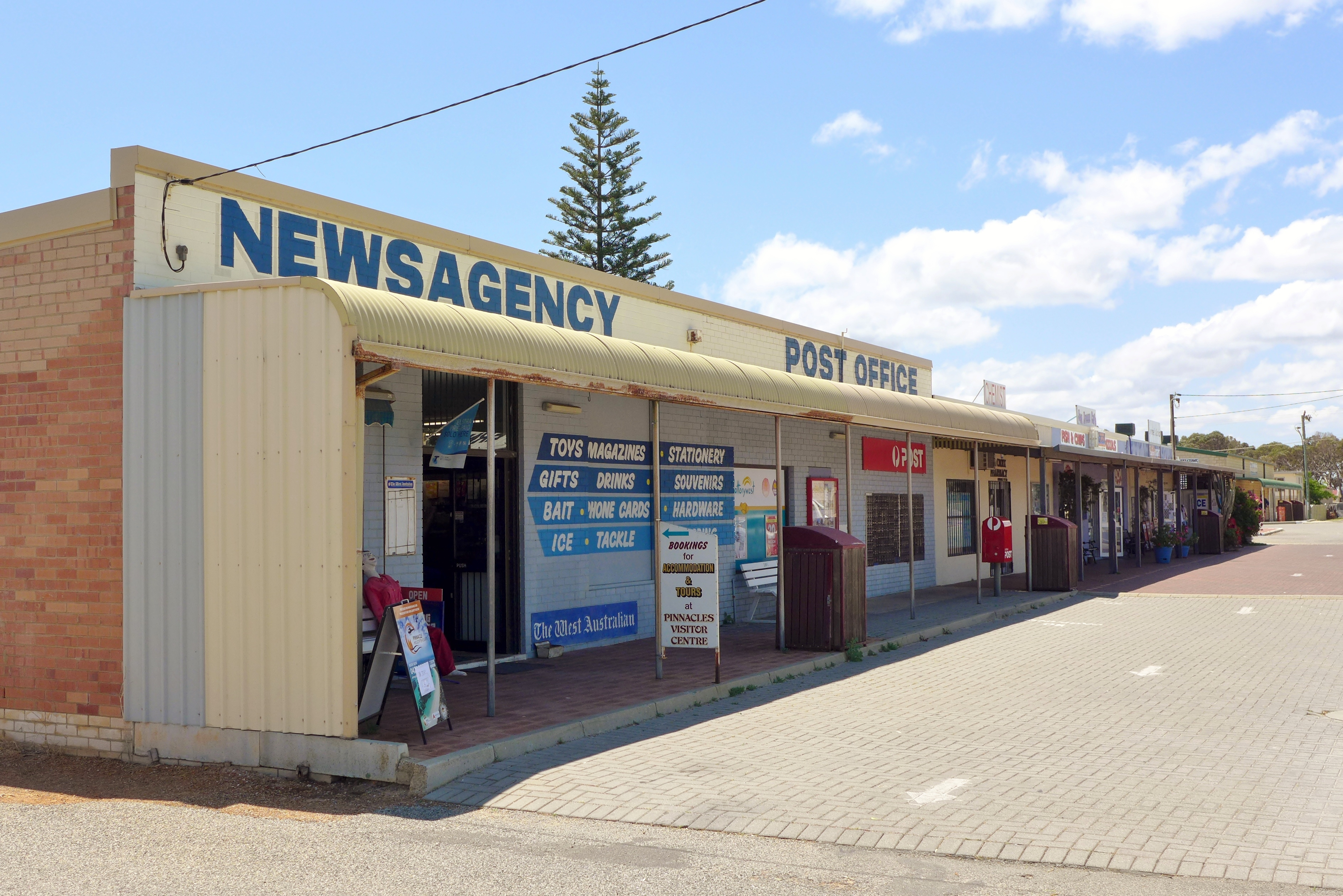
- The main shopping strip at Cervantes, 2015

- Interactive map of Cervantes
- Coordinates: 30.5°S 115.066°E
- Country: Australia
- State: Western Australia
- LGA: Shire of Dandaragan
- Location: 198 km (123 mi) NNW of Perth; 227 km (141 mi) SSE of Geraldton; 24 km (15 mi) S of Jurien Bay
- Established: 1962

Government
  - State electorate: Moore
  - Federal division: Durack

Area
  - Total: 9.8 km^{2} (3.8 sq mi)

Population
  - Total: 480 (SAL 2021)
- Postcode: 6511

Cervantes is a town in Western Australia about 198 kilometres (123 mi) north of the state capital, Perth, in the Shire of Dandaragan local government area. Based on the 2021 census, Cervantes had a population of 480 down from 527 in 2016. The town was named after a ship wrecked nearby that was, in turn, named after Miguel de Cervantes, author of Don Quixote.

The principal industry in the town is fishing. A small tourism industry is supported by the Pinnacles in nearby Nambung National Park. The saline Lake Thetis, which contains stromatolites, is also nearby.

== Geography ==
An arts festival is held every year in the town, usually on the last weekend of October. Cervantes lies on the shore of the Jurien Bay Marine Park. Most of the streets are named after cities, regions and rivers in Spain.

== Demographics ==
The 2021 Australian census showed a population of 480, 255 males (52.9%) and 227 females (47.1%) down from 527 in 2016 and had a median age of 55.

=== Ancestry ===
The percentages represent a proportion of the number of people in the area (including those who did not state an ancestry). (Note: Respondents had the option of reporting up to two ancestries on their census form, and this is captured by the ancestry multi-response. Therefore, the sum of all ancestry responses for an area will not equal the total number of people in the area.)

- English 211 (44.0%)
- Australian (Note: The Australian Bureau of Statistics has stated that most who nominate "Australian" as their ancestry have at least partial Anglo-Celtic ancestry.) 195 (40.6%)
- Scottish 49 (10.2%)
- Irish 37 (7.7%)
- German 15 (3.1%)
