= Hill River (Western Australia) =

River in Western Australia

Coordinates: 30°23′12″S 115°03′05″E

Location
- Country: Australia

Physical characteristics
- Source
  - location: 8 km (5.0 mi) east of Badgingarra
  - elevation: 328 m (1,076 ft)
- Mouth
  - location: Indian Ocean
  - elevation: sea level
- Length: 86 km (53 mi)
- Basin size: 3,721 km^{2} (1,437 sq mi)

The Hill River is a river in the Wheatbelt region of Western Australia.

== Geography ==
The headwaters of the Hill River rise near Dinner Hill, approximately 8 kilometres (5 mi) east of Badgingarra. It then flows in a westerly direction, crossing the Brand Highway just north of Badgingarra, passing through the Hill River Nature Reserve and the northern boundary of the Southern Beekeeper's Nature Reserve and finally discharging into the Indian Ocean 8.7 kilometres (5.4 mi) south of Jurien Bay.

The river has four tributaries; Coomallo Creek, Winjardie Creek, Munbinea Creek and Boothendara Creek.

== History ==
The river was seen and named by the explorer George Grey on 14 April 1839 during his second disastrous expedition along the Western Australian coast.

It was likely named after Rowland Hill, well known for his inception of the Uniform Penny Post, but importantly for Grey, Secretary to the Colonization Commissioners for South Australia (under the South Australia Act 1834). Grey's friend and promoter William Hutt M.P. was also a commissioner. In the previous week, Grey had also named rivers after Hutt, Hutt's wife Mary Bowes, Hutt's business partner John Chapman and Charles Buller M.P., an active parliamentary proponent of the free colonisation of South Australia. In October 1840, at 28 years of age, Grey was appointed Governor of South Australia.

== Hill River development ==
In the 1990s a proposed utilization of coal deposits at Mount Lesueur 10 kilometres (6 mi) north of the river by the Hill River Power Development Company, was abandoned in 1990 due to the creation of the Mount Leseuer National Park.

== Uses ==
The mouth of the Hill River is a popular camping destination and can be reached in a two-wheel drive vehicle. The river mouth is usually closed to the ocean by a sandbar, which opens up in periods of high river flow.
