= Ngururrpa Indigenous Protected Area =

Protected area in Western Australia, Australia

- IUCN category VI (protected area with sustainable use of natural resources)
- Location within Western Australia
- Coordinates: 21°10′S 128°10′E
- Area: 29,630 km^{2} (11,440 sq mi)
- Designation: Indigenous Protected Area
- Designated: 2020
- Operator: Ngururrpa Traditional Custodians

The Ngururrpa Indigenous Protected Area (Ngururrpa IPA), covering an area of 29,000 square kilometres (11,000 sq mi) in the far eastern area of the Pilbara region, in the Great Sandy Desert of Western Australia, was declared in October 2020. It includes all of the land included in the Ngururrpa native title area, as determined in 2007.

== Background ==
Peoples of the Walmajarri, Wangkatjunga, Ngarti and Kukatja language groups have called their country Ngururrpa, meaning "our country in the middle", and they are recognised as the traditional owners of the area; the IPA comprises the whole of the Ngururrpa native title determination made in 2007. The people lived a traditional lifestyle in the area until around the 1950s. Some elders remember seeing white people for the first time. They were left alone more than some of the surrounding groups, owing to the type of land offering poor grazing for European livestock, and there are no mines in the area. This also means that today there are no mining or pastoral jobs, and few opportunities for job creation in the area. The formation of the IPA has created jobs as rangers.

A ceremony was held in May 2021 to celebrate the designation of the land as an IPA, at the same spot where native title was officially proclaimed.

== Location and landscape ==
The 29,000 square kilometres (11,000 sq mi) of land lies in the far eastern area of the Pilbara region, in the Great Sandy Desert. The nearest community is Balgo. There are no permanent residents in the area, which includes a few outstations, only accessible by four-wheel-drive vehicles.

The land includes vast sandplains and dunefields as well as mountain ranges and mesas, ephemeral lakes, claypans and seasonal swamps. Increased cultural burning practices are expected to improve the environment for its flora and fauna.

== Flora and fauna ==
The sandy plains support some shrubby varieties of acacia and spinifex, while Acacia hilliana is found on lateritic areas. Bush tucker includes the bush potato.

Threatened species of fauna include the bilby (Macrotis lagotis), great desert skink (Egernia kintorei), marsupial mole (Notoryctes sp.) and brush-tailed mulgara. The critically endangered species, the night parrot, also inhabits the area.

== Heritage ==
Some of the earliest evidence of human occupation on the continent exists in Ngururrpa. The ancient creeks flowing eastwards into the swamps provide for good hunting and foraging, and there were plentiful sources of wood for shelter and tools. Rock engravings estimated at around 12,000 years exist within the IPA. Ngururrpa rangers continue to use Tjukurrpa to care for country.

The creation of the IPA ensures that sufficient funding is provided to protect both the cultural and environmental heritage of the area.
