= Wandjina =

Spirit beings of north-western Australian Aboriginal mythology

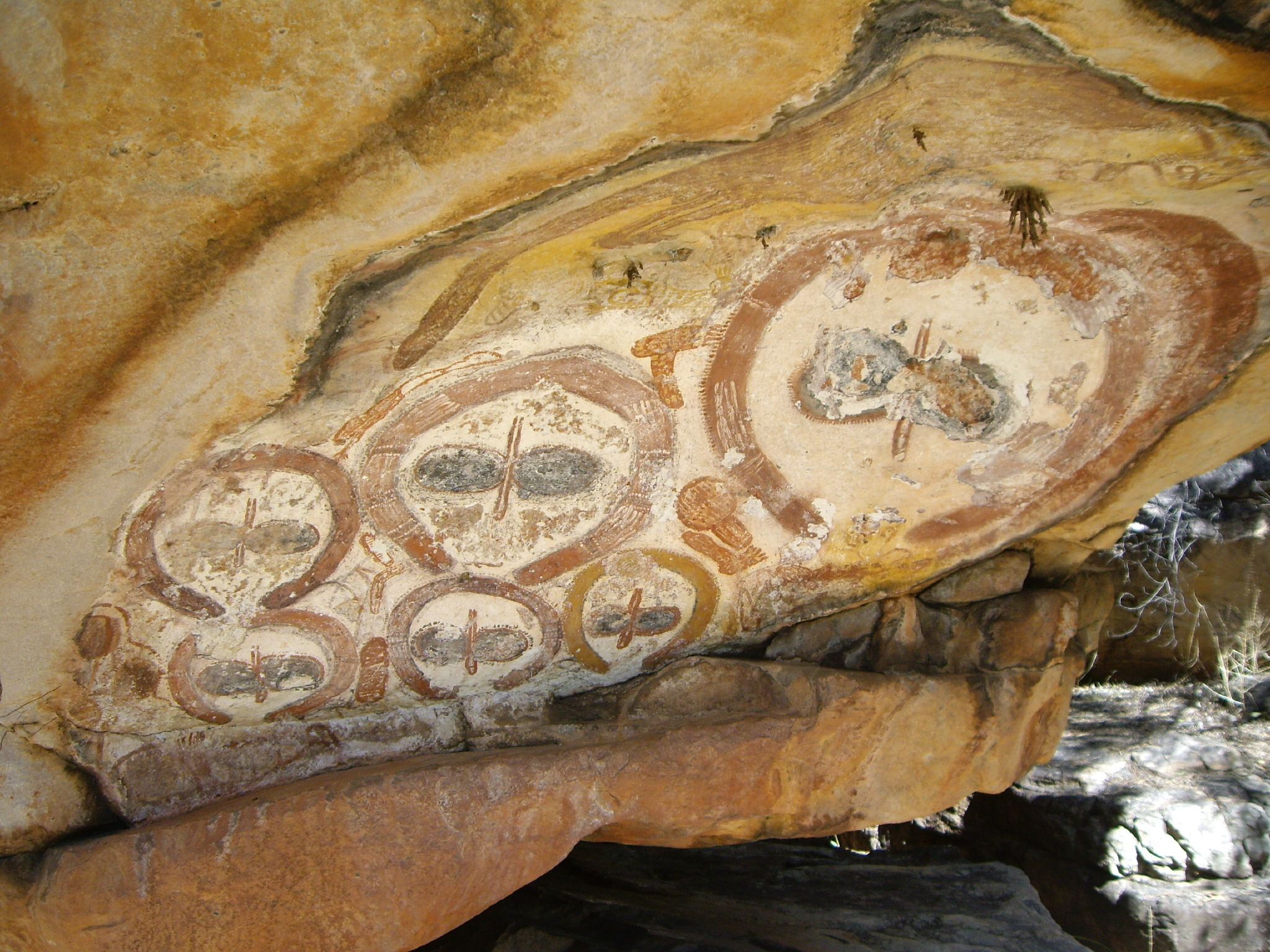
Wandjina rock art on the Barnett River, Mount Elizabeth Station

The Wandjina, also written Wanjina and Wondjina and also known as Gulingi, are cloud and rain spirits in the beliefs of the Wanjina Wunggurr cultural bloc of Aboriginal Australians, depicted prominently in rock art in northwestern Australia. Some of the artwork in the Kimberley region of Western Australia dates back to approximately 4,000 years ago. Another closely related spirit entity is the creator being Wunngurr, a being analogous to the Rainbow Serpent in other Aboriginal peoples' belief systems, but with a different interpretation.

The stories of the Wandjina and the artwork depicting them remain important to the Mowanjum Community of Aboriginal people, and are one of the basic cultural elements of the Wanjina Wunggurr cultural bloc, which includes four Aboriginal peoples in the Kimberley.

== Dreamtime legends ==
Some Dreamtime stories say the Wandjina created the landscape and its inhabitants, and continue to have influence over both. When the spirits found the place they would die, they painted their images on cave walls and entered a nearby waterhole. These paintings were then refreshed by Aboriginal people as a method of regenerating life force.

The Wandjina can punish those who break the law with floods, lightning and cyclones.

=== Wandjina and Wunggurr beliefs ===
The Wandjina and Wunggurr spirits are essential elements of the life of the cultural bloc known as the Wanjina Wunggurr, consisting of the Worrorra (and neighbouring Ngardi), Wunambal and Ngarinyin peoples of the Kimberley. Rock paintings depicting Wanjina, as well as the Gwion Gwion ("Bradshaw") paintings, are evidence of the shared culture. The Wunambal people in the Mitchell Plateau area refer to Wandjina as Gulingi.

Wunggurr is a variant on the Rainbow Serpent creator being belief, while the wandjina are local spirits, attached to places, and associated with particular clans. Although some local expressions use the two terms interchangeably, wungurr is a "more diffuse life force animating and underlying the particular manifestations of its power that find expression in all species of things, including the wandjina". One facet of wungurr is embodied in a rock python known as Wanjad.

== Traditional rock artwork ==
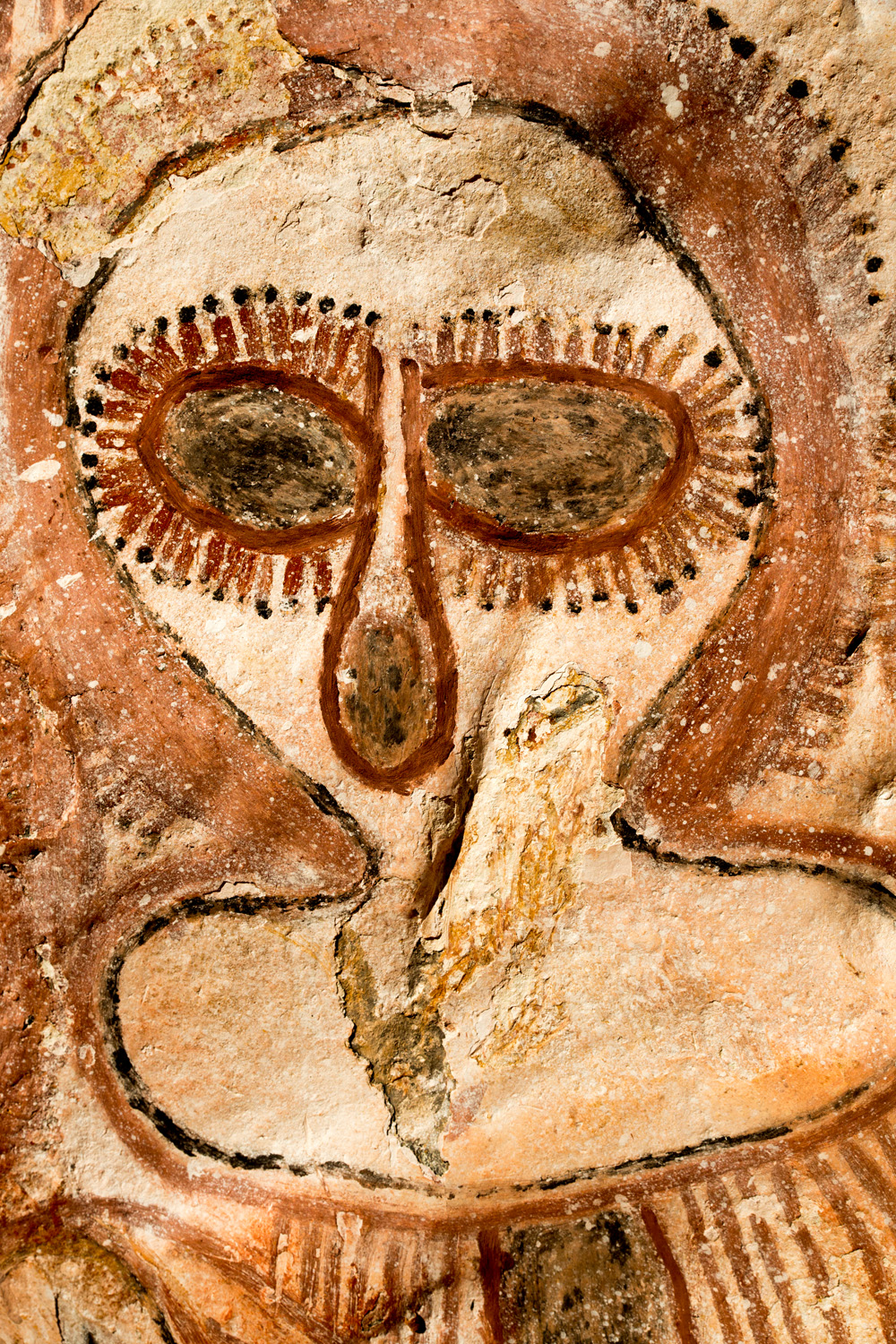
Wandjina at Mt Elizabeth Station

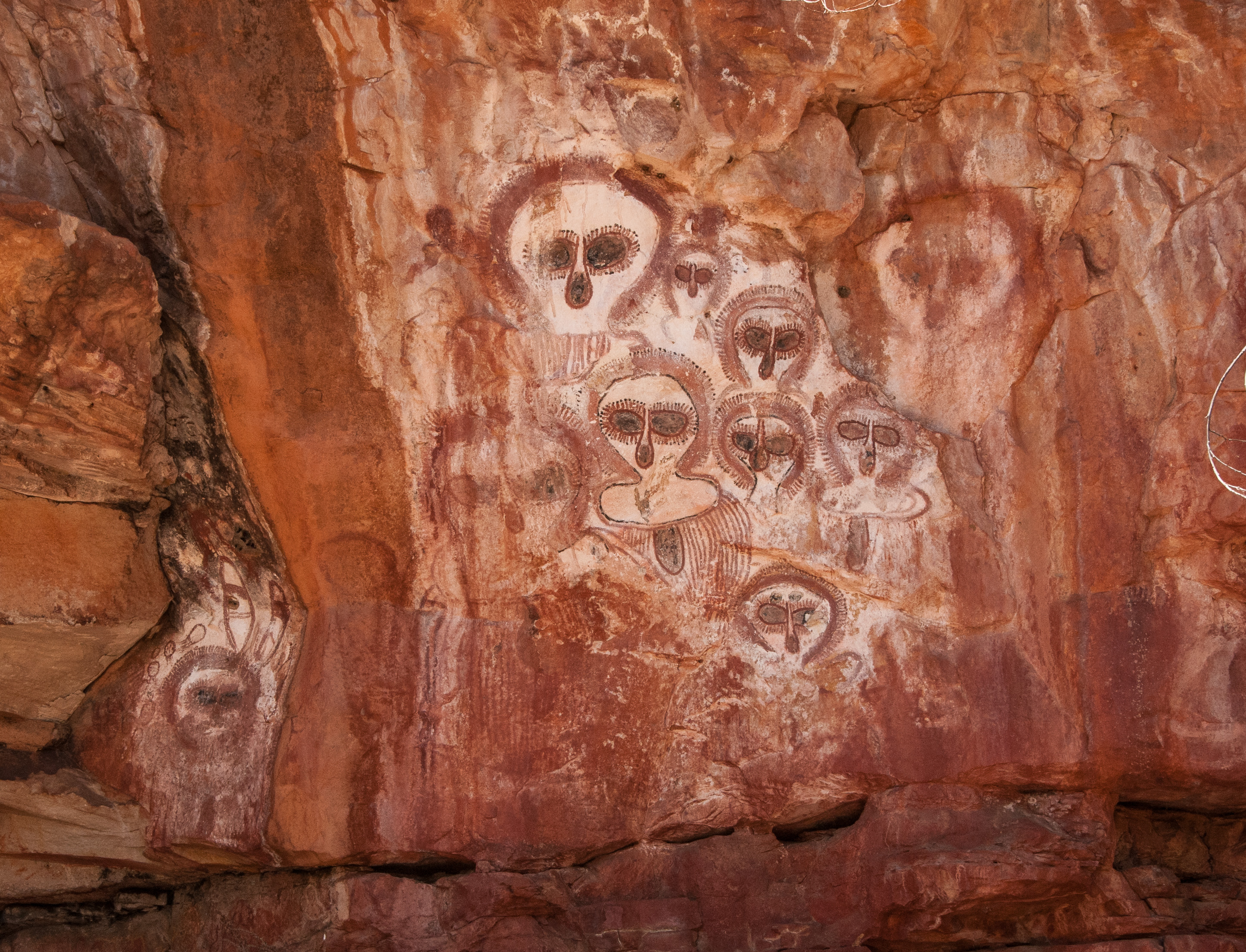
Wandjina rock art on the Barnett River, Mount Elizabeth Station

The broad-stroke artwork of the Wandjina rock art dates to around 3800–4000 years ago. The emergence of this art style follows the end of a millennium-long drought that gave way to a wetter climate characterised by regular monsoons.

The Wandjina paintings have common colours of black, red and yellow on a white background. The spirits are depicted alone or in groups, vertically or horizontally depending on the dimensions of the rock, and are sometimes depicted with figures and objects like the Rainbow Serpent or yams. Common composition is with large upper bodies and heads that may show eyes and nose, but typically no mouth. Two explanations have been given for this: they are so powerful they do not require speech and if they had mouths, the rain would never cease. Around the heads of Wandjina are lines or blocks of color, depicting lighting coming out of transparent helmets.

Today, the paintings are still believed to possess these powers and therefore are to be approached and treated respectfully. Each site and painting has a name. Indigenous people of the Mowanjum community repaint the images to ensure the continuity of the Wandjina's presence. Annual repainting in December or January also ensures the arrival of the monsoon rains, according to Mowanjum belief.

Repainting has occurred so often that at one site the paint is over 40 layers deep. The painting style has evolved during this process: more recent figures are stockier and some now possess eyelashes.

== Depictions on bark ==
In the late 1960s and early 1970s several Mowanjum artists depicted traditional Wandjina on pieces of string bark. These bark paintings were sold mainly through the mission at Kalumbaru. Some of the important artists from this region include Alec Mingelmanganu, Charlie Numbelmoore and Jack Karedada. These artworks are now in major museum collections around the world.

== Other depictions ==
Wandjina were the inspiration for a 1966 children's fantasy television series, Wandjina!, produced by ABC Television in 1966.

In 2007, graffiti depictions of Wandjina appeared in Perth, Western Australia. Styles ranged from stencil-work to a spray painted Wandjina driving a pink car. Using Flickr and blogs, several people engaged in "Wandjina watching", documenting the Wandjina graffiti they found. These "wandering Wandjina" angered and upset some Indigenous people who said that only certain artists from their people are permitted to depict the Wandjina, without saying who these people are. A short film, Who Paintin' Dis Wandjina, discussed the Aboriginal reaction.

Images of the Wandjina are displayed on the walls of the Ringwood Magistrates Court in Victoria; these are referenced as produced the National Gallery of Victoria.

In 2016, during the Vivid Sydney festival, artwork of Wandjina by artist Donny Woolagoodja was projected onto the Sydney Opera House as part of its Lighting of the Sails celebration.

In 2023, Wandjina was added to the popular mobile game Fate/Grand Order, initially as an antagonist and later as a playable character as a Foreigner-class Servant.

== See also ==
- Indigenous Australian art
- Weather god
- List of Stone Age art
- List of rain deities
