= Worrorra =

Indigenous people in Western Australia

Worrorran languages (Note: Adapted from Rumsey 2018, pp. 91–101.)

The Worrorra, also written Worora, are an Aboriginal Australian people of the Kimberley area of north-western Australia.

The term is sometimes used to describe speakers of the (Western) Worrorra language, and sometimes groups whose traditional languages are one of the whole group of Worrorran languages. A native title claim in which the people referred to themselves as the Dambimangari people was lodged in 1998 and determined in 2011. The word is said to be derived from Dambina (a name for the Worrorra) and Ngardi peoples. More recently, it has been spelt Dambeemangarddee.

The Worrorra, Wunambal and Ngarinyin peoples make up a cultural bloc known Wanjina Wunggurr, in which the Ngardi are sometimes also included.

== Country ==
The Worrorra are a coastal people, whose land extends from the area around Collier Bay and Walcott Inlet in the south, northwards along the coastlands of Doubtful Bay west of Montgomery Reef to the area of the Saint George Basin and Hanover Bay, encompassing Rathsay Water and Mount Trafalgar, running inland some 40 km (25 mi) to 48 km (30 mi), as far as Mount Hann and Mount French. Seawards it includes Heywood and Augustus Islands. On their southern boundaries lay the lands of the Umida and Unggumi people; to their east the Ngarinyin, and northwards, west of the Princess May Range, the Wunambal. The ancestral country is estimated to cover approximately 4,000 square miles (10,000 km^{2}).

The zone is consistently affected by tropical heat, with three seasons defined by the Worrorra: aajaajirri, the monsoonal season running from mid-December through to April; mawingki, in June-July, with a slight night-time cooling of temperatures, and then mirringunu, the torrid months from October to mid-December. The landscape is hilly sandstone terrain, quilted with spinifex and loose stands of bloodwood eucalypts, woollybutts and boabs.

=== Wanjina Wungurr cultural bloc ===
The Worrorra, Wunambal, and Ngarinyin peoples form a cultural bloc known Wanjina Wunggurr. The shared culture is based on the dreamtime mythology and law whose creators are the Wanjina and Wunggurr spirits, ancestors of these peoples.

Rock paintings depicting Wanjina, as well as the Gwion Gwion ("Bradshaw") paintings, are evidence of the shared culture.

Wunggurr is a variant on the Rainbow Serpent creator being belief, while the wandjina are local spirits, attached to places, and associated with particular clans. Although some local expressions use the two terms interchangeably, wungurr is a "more diffuse life force animating and underlying the particular manifestations of its power that find expression in all species of things, including the wandjina". One facet of wungurr is embodied in a rock python (Stimson's python?), known as Wanjad.

The Ngardi people have also been grouped with the other Wanjina Wungurr peoples, with a close link to the Worrorran (Dambina) people, sometimes referred to as Dambina-Ngardi or Dambimangari.

According to Mark Clendon, the grouping

is recognized as such by its members, and defined by the possession or knowledge in common of a set of cultural artefacts unique to this region, the most obvious of which are:

- The supernatural Wandjina (Wanjurna) ancestors and culture heroes;
- A common social division into two named, exogamous patrimoieties, called in Worrorra Arrbalarriya and Arrwunarriya;
- A group of languages with a significant number of typological and lexical features in common;
- The manufacture of a beautifully made and prestigious type of stone spear head, called in English a Kimberley point;
- The double-raft or kalam;
- A distinctive type of kinship organisation, based on extended, exogamous, virilocal, patrilineally reckoned families located in discrete, named areas of land;
- The wurnarn cycle, a ritualized, long-term, long-distance exchange network, with important social consequences beyond the economic.

=== Native title claim ===
As part of a native title claim lodged in 1998 by Wanjina Wunggurr RNTBC known as the Dambimangari claim, which included claims for the three peoples in the Wanjina Wunggurr cultural bloc (the Worrorra/Dambimangari, Wunambal Gaambera/Uunguu and Ngarinyin/Wilinggin (Note: These three peoples make up a cultural bloc known as Wanjina Wunggur. Worrorra is the name of the people, Dambimangari their land; the land of the Wunambal Gaambera people is known as Uunguu; and that of the Ngarinyin is Wilinggin. (Dambimangari means "belonging to homeland".))), Worrorra people lodged a claim in the National Native Title Tribunal over a large area of land, which was determined on 26 May 2011. The area covers 27,932 km^{2} (10,785 sq mi), stretching from King Sound, Camden Sound and Montgomery Reef, including the Buccaneer Archipelago, across to Hall Point and Horizontal Falls. It includes sea, coastal lands and hinterland, including Worrorra traditional lands between Prince Regent River to the north and Robinson River to the south, as well as including some of the Prince Regent National Park. Much of the area is under exclusive possession.

The Dambimangari Aboriginal Corporation manages the Dambimangari people's business affairs, while the Wanjina Wunggurr RNTBC acts on behalf of the Worrora/Dambimangari, Ngarinyin (Wilinggin) and Wunambal Gaambera (Uunguu) (Note: For group name equivalences, see Wunambal Gaambera People.) native title holders with regard to their rights and interests.

=== Marine parks ===
The Dambimangari (as of 2020 spelt Dambeemangarddee) Aboriginal Corporation co-manages the Lalang-garram / Horizontal Falls Marine Park. In 2016 it was planned that this park, together with the Lalang-garram / Camden Sound Marine Park, North Lalang-garram Marine Park (the northern extent of Dambimangari saltwater country) and the North Kimberley Marine Park (in Uunguu waters) would make up the new Great Kimberley Marine Park, with the Government of Western Australia's Department of Parks and Wildlife (now Department of Biodiversity, Conservation and Attractions). Several sacred sites fall within these areas.

In 2020, a new management plan was released, titled Lalang-gaddam Marine Park: Amended joint management plan for the Lalang-garram / Camden Sound, Lalang-garram / Horizontal Falls and North Lalang-garram marine parks and indicative joint management plan for the proposed Maiyalam Marine Park. It was published ahead of the gazettal of the proposed Maiyalam Marine Park under the Conservation and Land Management Act 1984 (the "CALM Act"): as a Class A reserve. Under the new arrangements, the zoning would not change, but the plan is now to amalgamate four marine parks (Lalang-garram / Camden Sound, Lalang-garram / Horizontal Falls, North Lalang-garram Marine Park and the new Maiyalam Marine Park) to form the Lalang-gaddam Marine Park, all in the sea country of the Dambeemangarddee people. This plan will be amended by another 10-year final joint management plan.

The new Maiyalam Marine Park will create add 47,000 hectares (120,000 acres) to the Kimberley marine reserves. The larger plan is to create a total of 5,000,000 hectares (12,000,000 acres) of new national and marine reserves in Western Australia. The new spelling, "Lalang-gaddam", reflects the correct pronunciation of the word, and "Maiyalam" means "between islands", or "a gap through". The new Maiyalam Marine Park covers an area off the north-western coast of King Sound and around Macleay Island.

The new Lalang-gaddam Marine Park borders the proposed Mayala Marine Park to the south-west (covering the Buccaneer Archipelago, traditional land and waters of the Mayala peoples), and the North Kimberley Marine Park (Uunguu waters) to the north-east. The land and sea border to the south abut Bardi Jawi land and a proposed Bardi Jawi Marine Park. Maps show the extent of the various marine parks, native title determinations, zones within the areas, etc.

Details such as port areas are outlined in the plan. An Indigenous land use agreement (ILUA) already covers the Lalang-garram/ Camden Sound, Lalang-garram/ Horizontal Falls and North Lalang-garram marine parks, but an additional ILUA will be needed to allow the creation of the proposed Maiyalam Marine Park in accordance with the Native Title Act 1993. Much of Collier Bay will remain a general use zone, but the Walcott Inlet will be zoned as sanctuary.

=== IPA ===
An Indigenous Protected Area was declared in 2013 over an area covering 642,294 ha (1,587,140 acres) from north of Derby stretching eastwards to the Prince Regent area. It is managed by the Dambimangari Rangers, a team of Indigenous rangers.

== History since first European contact ==
As early as 1838, the explorer George Grey had described three rock paintings in Worrorra territory. Inside a cave 20 feet (6.1 m) deep, he saw one imposing figure over 10 feet (3.0 m) long depicted on the roof, wrapped in a red garment and head wraps leaving only the eyes visible, staring from the roof down towards anyone who ventured into the cave. On either side were two more, which he was unable to determine what they represented. Grey made a copy which he printed in his book. Many wild speculations arose concerning their origin, Arthur Capell linking them to the diffusion of megalithic cults and ultimately to chambered tombs in Europe and Egypt. These were later identified however as Wandjina figures in Worrorra mythology.

From around 1912 the Worrorra people came into contact with increasing numbers of European settlers.

In 1927 James Robert Beattie Love, a Presbyterian minister, was appointed to head the Presbyterian Mission to the Aborigines which had been established at Kunmunya, known then as Port George IV, in 1912. Love had already been familiar with the area, which he visited in 1914, and had briefly taken charge of pastoral work there.

The Worrorra left their traditional territory in 1956, settling in Mowanjum and later also Derby, with a few resident at Mount Barnett station and Kalumburu. One effect of the transfer was to endanger their indigenous culture as it was conserved in their distinctive language, since they came to adopt either Since 1956 Worrorra people have lived at Mowanjum in close daily contact with people who spoke either Ungarinyin or Wunambal as their mother tongue. Later this was replaced by Kriol.

== Language ==
By the time intense contact with white settlers began, around 1912, the Worrorra people who still spoke their native tongue fluently were estimated to be around 300, with perhaps triple that figure if those in surrounding districts who spoke it as a second language are included.

The Worrorra language (also known as Western Worrorran, being one of three main groups of the family of Worrorran languages) is now considered to be on the verge of extinction. Only seven speakers were recorded in the 2016 Australian census.

The British-born Australian linguist Robert M. W. Dixon's career in Australian Aboriginal languages was first stimulated by his being informed by his tutor Michael Halliday of the extraordinary complexity of the indigenous languages spoken in the Kimberley region, and, on reading up on the topic, was particularly fascinated by descriptions of the intricacies of Worrorra which reportedly had 444 forms of the verb "to be". Though the Worrorra have not as highly developed a system of gestural language as many of their tribal neighbours, they do have a rich repertoire of manual signs to indicate a great many species of fauna, to the point of distinguishing the sex of the animal or bird alluded to.

== Notable people ==
- Daisy Utemorrah (1922–1993), Wunambal elder, poet and writer, was fluent in Wunambal, Ngarinyin, and Worrorra, and gained international fame with her books recounting the traditional stories of her people.
- Vinka Barunga, who grew up in Mowanjum and Derby, graduated from the University of Western Australia with an MBBS in 2016, and is the first Worrora doctor and the first Aboriginal doctor in Derby.

== Alternative names ==
- Maialnga (unconfirmed northern horde name)
- Worora, Wo'rora
- Wurara, Worara (pronounced thus by the Ngarinjin)

Source Tindale 1974, p. 261

== Sources ==
- "About". Dambimangari Aboriginal Corporation. 26 August 2020.
- "AIATSIS map of Indigenous Australia". AIATSIS. 14 May 2024.
- "Aztec Resources Ltd Announcements - Aztec Resources Ltd: Koolan Island Agreement". Investegate. 24 April 2006.
- "Census 2016, Language spoken at home by Sex (SA2+)". ABS.Stat. ABS.
- Clendon, Mark (2014). Worrorra: a language of the north-west Kimberley coast (PDF). University of Adelaide. ISBN 978-1-922064-59-2. Text has been copied from this source, which is available under a Attribution 4.0 International (CC BY 4.0) licence.
- "Copy of Native Title Map". Kimberley Land Council. 7 August 2013. Archived from the original on 30 March 2021.
- "Daisy Utemorrah". Austlit. 6 October 2011.
- "Dambimangari IPA". National Indigenous Australians Agency.
- Department of Parks and Wildlife (November 2016). Lalang-garram / Horizontal Falls and North Lalang-garram marine parks: Joint management plan 2016 (PDF). Management plan 88. Perth: DPAW. ISBN 978-1-921703-76-8.
- Dixon, R. M. W. (2011). Searching for Aboriginal Languages: Memoirs of a Field Worker. Cambridge University Press. ISBN 978-1-108-02504-1.
- Edmond, Martin (2013). Chronicle of the Unsung. Auckland University Press. ISBN 978-1-869-40507-6.
- Elkin, A. P. (1949). "Grey's Northern Kimberley Cave-Paintings Re-Found". Oceania. 19 (1): 1–15. doi:10.1002/j.1834-4461.1948.tb00492.x. JSTOR 40328184.
- Fitness, Blackfit (15 June 2020). "Culture today with Dr. Vinka Barunga". Blackfit Fitness.
- Gray, Lorna (18 November 2016). "Vinka Barunga is first Aboriginal doctor in her town". Now To Love.
- Grey, George (1841). Journals of Two Expeditions of Discovery in North West and Western Australia. Vol. 1. T. and W. Boone.
- "Home at the heart of graduate's journey". The University of Western Australia] Medical School. 1 June 2017.
- Hunjan, Raveen (8 July 2019). "Meet the Aboriginal doctor turning tragedy to triumph". Insight (SBS TV). Special Broadcasting Service.
- Jones, Philip (2011). "Inside Mountford's Tent: Paint, politics, and paperwork". In Thomas, Martin; Neale, Margo (eds.). Exploring the Legacy of the 1948 Arnhem Land Expedition. Australian National University. pp. 33–54. ISBN 978-1-921-66645-2.
- Kendon, Adam (1988). Sign Languages of Aboriginal Australia: Cultural, Semiotic and Communicative Perspectives. Cambridge University Press. ISBN 978-0-521-36008-1.
- Layton, Robert (1992). Australian Rock Art: A New Synthesis. Cambridge University Press. ISBN 978-0-521-34666-5.
- Love, J. H. (1986). "James Robert Beattie Love (1889–1947)". Love, James Robert Beattie (1889–1947). Australian Dictionary of Biography. Vol. 10. Melbourne University Press. pp. 54–78.
- Mountford, Charles P. (1978). "The Rainbow Serpent Myths of Australia". In Buchler, Ira R.; Maddock, Kenneth (eds.). The Rainbow Serpent: A Chromatic Piece. Walter de Gruyter. pp. 23–97. ISBN 978-3-110-80716-5.
- "Native Title Determination Details: WCD2011/002 - Dambimangari". National Native Title Tribunal. 7 October 2010.
- Rumsey, Alan (2018). "The sociocultural dynamics of indigenous multilingualism in northwestern Australia". Language & Communication. 62: 91–101. doi:10.1016/j.langcom.2018.04.011. ISSN 0271-5309. S2CID 150007441.
- "Tindale Tribal Boundaries" (PDF). Department of Aboriginal Affairs, Western Australia. September 2016. Archived from the original (PDF) on 8 March 2016.
- Tindale, Norman Barnett (1974). "Worora (WA)". Aboriginal Tribes of Australia: Their Terrain, Environmental Controls, Distribution, Limits, and Proper Names. Australian National University Press. ISBN 978-0-708-10741-6. Archived from the original on 20 March 2020.
- "Ungarinyin Religion". Encyclopedia.com.
- "Wunambal Gaambera People". Wunambal Gaambera Country. 14 February 2020. Includes map.
