= James Robert Beattie Love =

Presbyterian clergyman (1889–1947)

James Robert Beattie Love, MC, DCM (16 June 1889 – 19 February 1947) was a Presbyterian clergyman who became a major authority on the Worrorra people of the Kimberley region of north Western Australia. Though he is less well-known, it has been argued that he played an important a role in tending to the Aboriginal communities under his care as did more celebrated figures like John Flynn.

== Life ==
Love was born on 16 June 1889 at Lislaird, County Tyrone in Ireland. His father emigrated to Australia when Love was several months old, and eventually settled in Strathalbyn, South Australia. Love qualified as a teacher and was assigned to a post at the school in the small northern mining town of Leigh Creek, where his interest was aroused in ornithology. One variety of chat he captured for taxonomic analysis by Edwin Ashby, known as the gibberbird, turned out to belong to a new species, and was named after both Love and Ashby (Ashbyia lovensis). It allowed him also to visit and observe missionary work among the Diyari at the Lutheran mission at Lake Killalpaninna. The experience convinced him missions should be "industrial" rather than, as there, primarily religious, noting that one native had fled the station complaining of "too much Jesus Christ yabber". He made a lengthy solitary trek on horseback across Australia, from south to north, Leigh Creek to Darwin, then east to Charleville, and drew up a report which was published as a pamphlet ion 1915, regarding the conditions of the Aboriginal people as he had observed them.

A year after the First World War broke out, Love joined the Australian Imperial Force and was eventually assigned to the Anzac section of the Camel Corps with the rank of second lieutenant. He was repatriated after suffering a wound, and awarded both the Distinguished Conduct Medal and the Military Cross for his courage.

After theological studies at the Presbyterian Theological College of Ormond College, University of Melbourne, on ordination in 1922 he took up a posting at Mapoon in Queensland. In 1927 he moved with his new family to the mission at Kunmunya in northern Western Australia, where he had spent some time in 1914. The mission – shifted inland in a more isolated area because Love, like others, thought ready contact with the white way debased Aboriginal people – catered to the ill and aged among the Worrorra, Ngarinyin and Wunambal peoples, ran farms with livestock, encouraging a transition to agricultural and pastoral self-sufficiency. He had an unusual brief for the time of "non-interference" with the traditional culture, in some of which rites he came to think he could detect analogies with Christianity, likening their manner of washing and sharing drinking water to the sacraments. He actively encouraged Aboriginal people to conserve and transmit the traditions of the elders, such as the ceremonies of initiation, thinking that Christianity could only be taught by example, and adopted by natives who decided to do so on their own. He too adopted some of their usages, shouting goodbye, for example, when a corpse was laid out on a tree platform. It was widely regarded as one of the most successful missionary enterprises in Australia, and Love was called by the Worrorra, djidjai (daddy), as his wife Beatrice was known as amagunja (mummy).

He became superintendent at the Ernabella mission in 1941, which he had established in the Musgrave Ranges in 1937. He retired in 1946 and died of kidney disease on 19 February 1947.

== Evaluation ==
Love did not think of "blackfellows" as the white man's equal, except perhaps in intelligence, but practised a policy of "enlightened gradualism" to bring about their assimilation. In some aspects, he shared the outlook of the "nemesis of Australian Aborigines", A. O. Neville, as when he wrote that: "the solution of the half-caste problem is to train the half-caste to earn his own civilised living.. and gradually lose him in the stream of white blood."

== Publications ==
- 1915. The Aborigines, Their Present Condition as Seen in Northern South Australia, the Northern Territory and Western Queensland. (pamphlet) Arbuckle, Waddell and Fawckner, Melbourne.
- 1917. 'Notes on the Wororra Tribe of North-western Australia', in Transactions of the Royal Society of South Australia, vol.41, pp. 20–38
- 1936. Stone-Age Bushmen of Today. Blackie and Son
- 2000. The grammatical structure of the Worora language of North-Western Australia. (M.A. thesis, University of Adelaide, 1933), reprinted Lincoln Europa (ed. Robert M. W. Dixon)

== Notes and references ==
=== References ===
- Harris, John (1990). One Blood: 200 Years of Aboriginal Encounter with Christianity: a Story of Hope. Albatross Books. ISBN 978-0-867-60095-7.
- Layton, Robert (1992). Australian Rock Art: A New Synthesis. Cambridge University Press. ISBN 978-0-521-34666-5.
- Love, J. H. (1986). Love, James Robert Beattie (1889–1947). Australian Dictionary of Biography. Vol. 10. Melbourne University Press. pp. 54–58.
- Love, J. R. B. (1917). "Notes on Ashlyia lovensis". South Australian Ornithologist. 3/4: 40–41.
- MacGregor, Russell (1997). Imagined Destinies:Aboriginal Australians and the Doomed Race Theory, 1880–1939. Melbourne University Press. ISBN 978-0-522-84762-8.
- McKenzie, Maisie (1969). The Road to Mowamjnun. Angus and Robertson.
- Trudinger, David (2004). Converting Salvation:Protestant Missionaries in Central Australia, 1930-40s (PDF). ANU doctoral thesis. pp. 54–58.
