= Ngardi =

Aboriginal Australian people of NW Australia

The Ngardi, also spelled Ngarti, are an Aboriginal Australian people of the Northern Territory and Western Australia.

== Name and grouping ==
Arthur Capell took the term Ngardi to refer, not to a distinct tribe, but to a branch of the Warlpiri, a point contested by Norman Tindale, who maintained they were distinct.

The Wanjina and Wunggurr spirits are essential elements of the life of the cultural bloc known as the Wanjina Wunggurr, generally consisting of the Worrorra, Wunambal and Ngarinyin peoples of the Kimberley. For the purpose of a mineral rights agreement with a mining company in 2006, the Worrorra were also grouped with the Ngardi, as Dambimangari (Dambima-Ngardi), said to share the Wanjina-Wunggurr belief systems. Rock paintings depicting Wanjina, as well as the Gwion Gwion ("Bradshaw") paintings, are evidence of the shared culture.

== Country ==
In Norman Tindale's calculations, the Ngarti's tribal territory stretched over approximately 25,000 square miles (65,000 km^{2}), covering the sandhill country west of the Tanami track, extending from Chilla Well, the Granites, and Gardiner Range over the border into Western Australia at Ima Ima. They were present at Sturt Creek, and the Pallottine Mission area at Balgo Hill. Their southern extension, he adds, went as far as across the mulga scrubland to Milidjipi and Tekkari north of Lake Mackay.

=== Joint land claim ===
On 21 August 1980 a land claim was submitted by 90 claimants on behalf of the Warlpiri, Kukatja and Ngarti peoples, as traditional owners, under the Aboriginal Land Rights (Northern Territory) Act 1976, for an area of about 2,340 square kilometres (900 sq mi). It was the 11th traditional land claim presented on behalf of Aboriginal traditional owners by the Central Land Council. The land borders on areas in which each of the languages – Ngarti, Warlpiri, and Kukatja – is dominant. People from the different language groups have been influenced by each other when residing at Balgo, Western Australia and Lajamanu, Northern Territory. The claim was presented at Balgo Mission. The recommendation handed down by Justice Sir William Kearney on 23 August 1985 and presented on 19 August 1986 was that "the whole of the claim area be granted to a Land Trust for the benefit of Aboriginals entitled by tradition to its use or occupation, whether or not the traditional entitlement is qualified as to place, time, circumstance, purpose or permission".

=== Mineral rights agreement ===
in April 2006, the Aztec Resources (now Mount Gibson Iron) mining company signed a co-existence agreement with the Dambimangari (Dambima/Worrorra-Ngardi) traditional owners of Koolan Island regarding their iron ore mining operations on the island. The agreement aimed to ensure that 30% of the 220 person workforce is filled by Indigenous people by the eighth year of operation.

== Language ==
The Ngarti people spoke the Ngardi language.

== Alternative names ==
- Bunara, Boonara
- Kolo (Pintubi exonym)
- Kukuruba (Ngalia exonym)
- Manggai (toponym)
- Munga (?) (cited by R. H. Mathews)
- Ngadi
- Ngari
- Panara (general term for grass seed winnowing tribes like the Ngarti)
- Puruwantung, Buruwatung
- Waiangara
- Waiangari (Ngalia exonym)
- Waingara, Waiangadi
- Walmala (pejorative)
- Waringari, Warangari (Warlpiri pejorative for the Ngarti)
- Wommana
- Woneiga, Wanayaga

Source: Tindale 1974, p. 234

== See also ==
- Ngururrpa, a grouping of peoples of language groups including Ngardi

== Sources ==
- Capell, Arthur (June 1940). "The Classification of Languages in North and North-West Australia (Continued)". Oceania. 10 (4): 404–433. doi:10.1002/j.1834-4461.1940.tb00304.x. JSTOR 40327866.
- Tindale, Norman Barnett (1974). "Ngardi (NT)". Aboriginal Tribes of Australia: Their Terrain, Environmental Controls, Distribution, Limits, and Proper Names. Australian National University Press. ISBN 978-0-708-10741-6.
