= Worrorra language =

Aboriginal Australian language of northern Western Australia

Worrorra
- Western Worroran
- Native to: Australia
- Region: Western Australia
- Ethnicity: Worrorra, Unggumi, Yawijibaya, Unggarranggu, Umiida, ?Maialnga
- Extinct: by 2014
- Language family: Worrorran: (Western); Worrorra
- Dialects: Worrorra; Unggumi; Yawidjibara; Windjarumi; Unggarrangu; Umiida; Maialnga?
- Signed forms: Worora Kinship Sign Language

Language codes
- ISO 639-3: Variously: wro – Worrorra xgu – Unggumi xud – Umiida xun – Unggarranggu jbw – Yawijibaya
- Glottolog: west2435
- AIATSIS: K17 Worrorra, K14 Unggumi, K49 Umiida, K55 Unggarrangu, K53 Yawijibaya
- ELP: Worrorra
- Worrorran languages

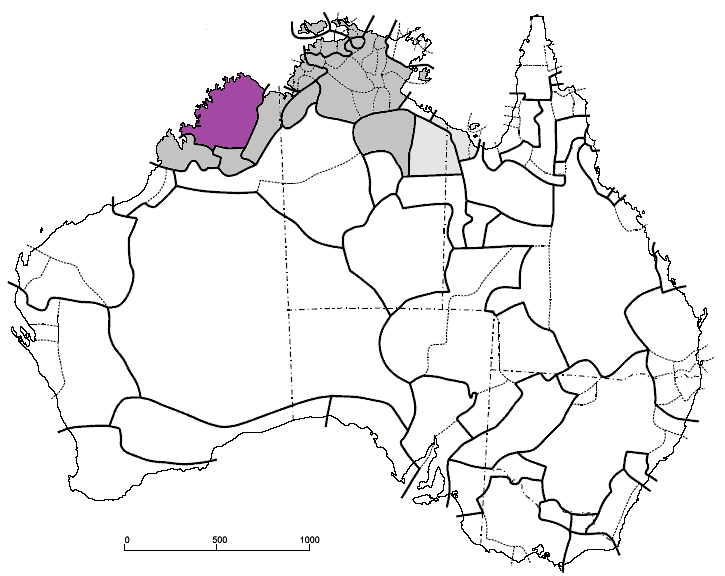
- Worrorran languages (purple), among other non-Pama-Nyungan languages (grey)

Worrorra, also written Worora and other variants, and also known as Western Worrorran, is a moribund Australian Aboriginal language of northern Western Australia. It encompasses a number of dialects, which are spoken by the Worrorra people. It is one of a group of Worrorran languages, the other two being Wunambal and Ngarinyin.

== Dialects ==
Worrorra is a dialect cluster; Claire Bowern (2011) recognises five languages: Worrorra proper, Unggumi, Yawijibaya, Unggarranggu, and Umiida. McGregor and Rumsey (2009) include the above dialects and also include Winyjarrumi (Winjarumi), describing Worrorra as a non-Pama-Nyungan language of the Worrorran group of languages known properly as western Worrorran.

An alleged Maialnga language was a reported clan name of Worrorra proper that could not be confirmed with speakers.

== History ==
In 1912, around 300 people spoke Worrorra as a native language, and around 600 more spoke it as a second language. In 1956, the Worrorra moved away from their traditional territory to Mowanjum Community, where they came into close contact with speakers of Ngarinyin. By the 1970s, Ngarinyin was the lingua franca at Mowanjum, and the number of fluent Worrorra speakers declined sharply to zero by the beginning of the 21st century. Only partial or passive speakers remained by 2014, and "others who may have forgotten what they once knew as teenagers", according to Mark Clendon.

=== Documentation ===
James Robert Beattie Love, an authority on the Worrora people, wrote his master's thesis on the grammar of Worora in 1932. It was published in 2000.

== Notable people ==
Elkin Umbagai was a translator between English and Worrorra.

== Phonology ==
Worrorra consonant phonemes
	Bilabial	Inter- dental	Alveolar	Retroflex	Palatal	Velar
Stop	p	t̪	t	ʈ	c	k
Nasal	m	n̪	n	ɳ	ɲ	ŋ
Rhotic			ɾ~r			
Lateral			l	ɭ	ʎ	
Approximant	w			ɻ	j	

- A nasal occurring before a stop consonant, is then realised as a prenasalized voiced stop sound (ex. [ŋɡ]).
- /r/ can be heard as a trill or a flap, and is typically only voiced when preceding a sonorant, voiced phoneme, or lateral consonant. Elsewhere, it is voiceless as [r̥], or can be heard in free variation.
- /j/ can also be heard as a fricative sound [ç] in word-initial positions.

Worrorra vowel inventory
	Front	Central	Back
High	i		u
Mid	e		o
Low		a	

- Long vowel sounds are noted as follows: /iː, ɛː, uː, ɔː, ɑː/.
- In between consonant clusters, an epenthetic vowel sound [ʉ̆] ~ [ɨ̆] occurs when breaking them up. Sometimes it can also be heard as a central vowel sound [ɨ].

Phoneme	Allophones
/i/	[i], [ɪ]
/a/	[a], [ɒ], [æ], [ɛ̞], [ɑ], [ɐ]
/u/	[u], [y], [ʊ]
/iː/	[iː], [ɪː]
/ɛː/	[eɪ], [ɛː] ~ [eː]
/ɑː/	[ɑˑɪ], [ɑ]
/ɔː/	[oʊ], [ɔː] ~ [ɒː]
/uː/	[uː], [ʊː]

== Sign language ==
The Worora have (or at one point had) a signed form of their language, used for speaking to kin in certain taboo relationships, but it is not clear from records that it was particularly well developed compared to other Australian Aboriginal sign languages.
