= Bossiaea arenitensis =

Sandstone winged pea

Scientific classification
- Kingdom: Plantae
- Clade: Tracheophytes
- Clade: Angiosperms
- Clade: Eudicots
- Clade: Rosids
- Order: Fabales
- Family: Fabaceae
- Subfamily: Faboideae
- Genus: Bossiaea
- Species: B. arenitensis

Binomial name
- Bossiaea arenitensis R.L.Barrett

Species of legume

Bossiaea arenitensis , commonly known as sandstone winged pea, is a species of flowering plant in the pea family Fabaceae and is endemic to the Kimberley region of Western Australia. It is an erect, spindly shrub with winged stems, winged cladodes, scale-like leaves and yellow, red and burgundy-coloured flowers.

== Description ==
Bossiaea arenitensis is an erect, spindly shrub that typically grows to 2.5 m (8 ft 2 in) high and 1–2 m (3 ft 3 in – 6 ft 7 in) wide. The stems are winged with a powdery white coating, and winged cladodes 6–18 mm (0.24–0.71 in) wide. The leaves are reduced to dark brown, narrow egg-shaped scales, 2.2–2.7 mm (0.087–0.106 in) long. The flowers are arranged singly or in pairs on a pedicel 3.4–8.9 mm (0.13–0.35 in) long with overlapping, narrow egg-shaped, brownish bracts. The sepals are 6.3–9.5 mm (0.25–0.37 in) long and joined at the base forming a tube, the two upper lobes 2.9–4.3 mm (0.11–0.17 in) long and the lower three lobes 1.7–1.9 mm (0.067–0.075 in) long. The standard petal is golden yellow with red and yellow markings and 10.3–13.7 mm (0.41–0.54 in) long, the wings yellow or orange and the keel yellow to burgundy-coloured. Flowering has been observed in January, April and June and the fruit is an oblong pod 36–49 mm (1.4–1.9 in) long.

== Taxonomy and naming ==
Bossiaea arenitensis was first formally described in 2015 by Russell Lindsay Barrett in the journal Nuytsia from specimens collected on Mount Elizabeth Station in 2007. The specific epithet (arenitensis) is the latinised version of arenite, a form of sandstone on which this species grows.

== Distribution and habitat ==
Sandstone winged pea grows in woodland on sandstone ridges and outcrops and is relatively widespread in the Kimberley region of Western Australia.

== Conservation status ==
This bossiaea is listed as "not threatened" by the Government of Western Australia Department of Parks and Wildlife.
