= Vansittart Bay =

Bay in Western Australia

- Banjal (Wunambal)
- Location within Western Australia
- Interactive map of Vansittart Bay
- Location: Kimberley region, Western Australia
- Coordinates: 14°02′S 126°17′E
- Part of: North Kimberley Marine Park
- Ocean/sea sources: Indian Ocean
- Islands: Mary Island, Jar Island

Vansittart Bay (Wunambal: Banjal) is a large bay on the north coast of the Kimberley region of Western Australia. The bay is located in a remote area in the far north of Australia, approximately 600 km (370 mi) north-east of Broome. It contains multiple islands including Mary Island and Jar Island. Vansittart Bay (including land and sea country) lies within the native title area of the Wunambal Gaambera people. The bay is known for several cultural and historic sites that are visited by ecotourism cruise vessels travelling along the Kimberley coast.

== Toponymy ==
The explorer Phillip Parker King named the bay for Chancellor of Exchequer Nicholas Vansittart, 1st Baron Bexley, in October 1819 during a survey of the Kimberley coast for the British Admiralty on HMS Mermaid. During his survey, King had an encounter with aboriginal people in Vansittart Bay, at a place now known as Encounter Cove.

The bay is named Banjal by the Wunambal Gaambera people.

== Geography ==
The Kimberley coast is a drowned continental landscape. When sea levels rose around 10,000 years ago, eroded riverbeds were flooded with seawater, creating a indented coastline and multiple islands and embayments. Vansittart Bay is one example of these embayments, and is located approximately 600 km (370 mi) north-east of Broome. The bay opens to the Indian Ocean, and has several islands including the Eclipse Archipelago at the mouth of the bay, and Mary Island, Jar Island and Low Island within the bay. Troughton Island lies offshore from the western entrance to the bay. The Anjo Peninsula separates Vansittart Bay from Napier Broome Bay to the east. Sir Graham Moore Island is offshore from the tip of the Anjo Peninsula, at the eastern end of the bay.

The Mungalalu Truscott Airbase (known as Truscott during World War II) is located on the Anjo Peninsula around 3 km (1.9 mi) inland from the eastern shores of Vansittart Bay, but the nearest settlement is Kalumburu, around 40 km (25 mi) to the south east.

A pearl farm has operated in Vansittart Bay.

== Native title ==
Vansittart Bay (including land and sea country) lies within the area of native title Uunguu Part A, determined on 23 May 2011. The body corporate established to hold, manage, and protect native title rights and interests on behalf of native title holders in this area is Wanjina-Wunggurr (Native Title) Aboriginal Corporation. However, the people call themselves Wunambal Gaambera.

== Ecotourism ==
The bay is known for the Gwion Gwion rock paintings on Jar Island, and the crash site of a Douglas C53 Skytrooper. These sites are visited by ecotourism cruise vessels during tours of the Kimberley region. Visitor locations are on land of the Wunambal Gaambera people. Access is managed by the Wunambal Gaambera Aboriginal Corporation.

== Aircraft incidents ==
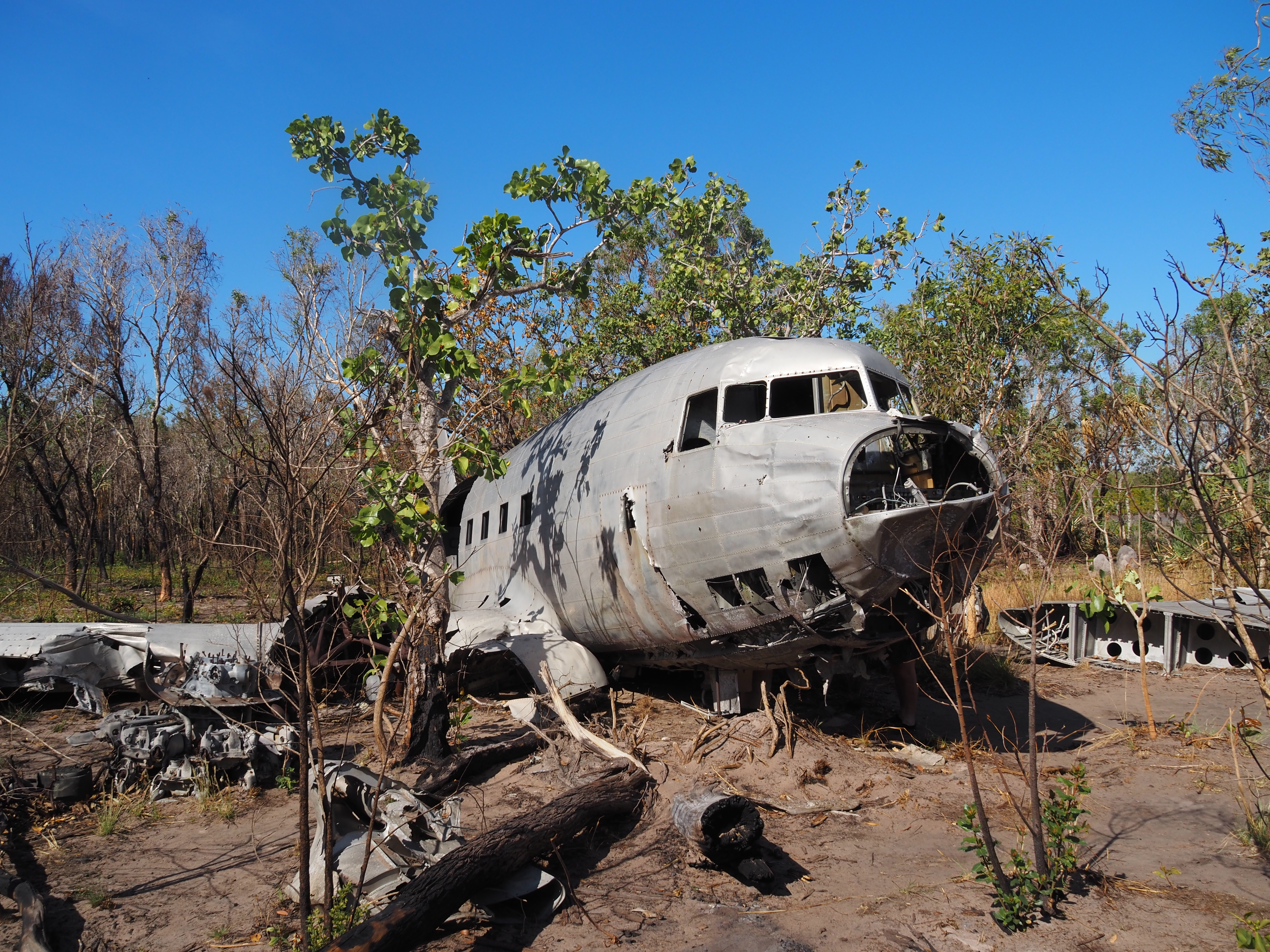
C-53 aircraft crash site at Vansittart Bay

On 26 February 1942, a USAAF Air Transport Command C-53 Skytrooper transport aircraft (a variant of the Douglas DC-3) on a flight from Perth to Broome made an emergency landing on a salt pan in the bay. A navigation error led to the plane flying well beyond Broome and running out of fuel. The crew and passengers all survived the crash and were rescued on 1 March 1942 by a Qantas Empire Airways Short S.23 flying boat.

On 23 March 1945, a Consolidated B-24 Liberator failed to gain height after taking off from nearby Mungalalu Truscott Airbase and crash-landed in the bay, killing all aboard. The wreckage of the aircraft remains submerged there.

== Arrival of illegal immigrants ==
Vansittart Bay has been a site for the arrival of illegal immigrants to Australia. In December 1999 a group of 54 landed at the bay, and a further 40 people were intercepted in January 2000. A group of 10 Chinese asylum seekers arrived at the bay in 2024 and walked to the Truscott airbase.

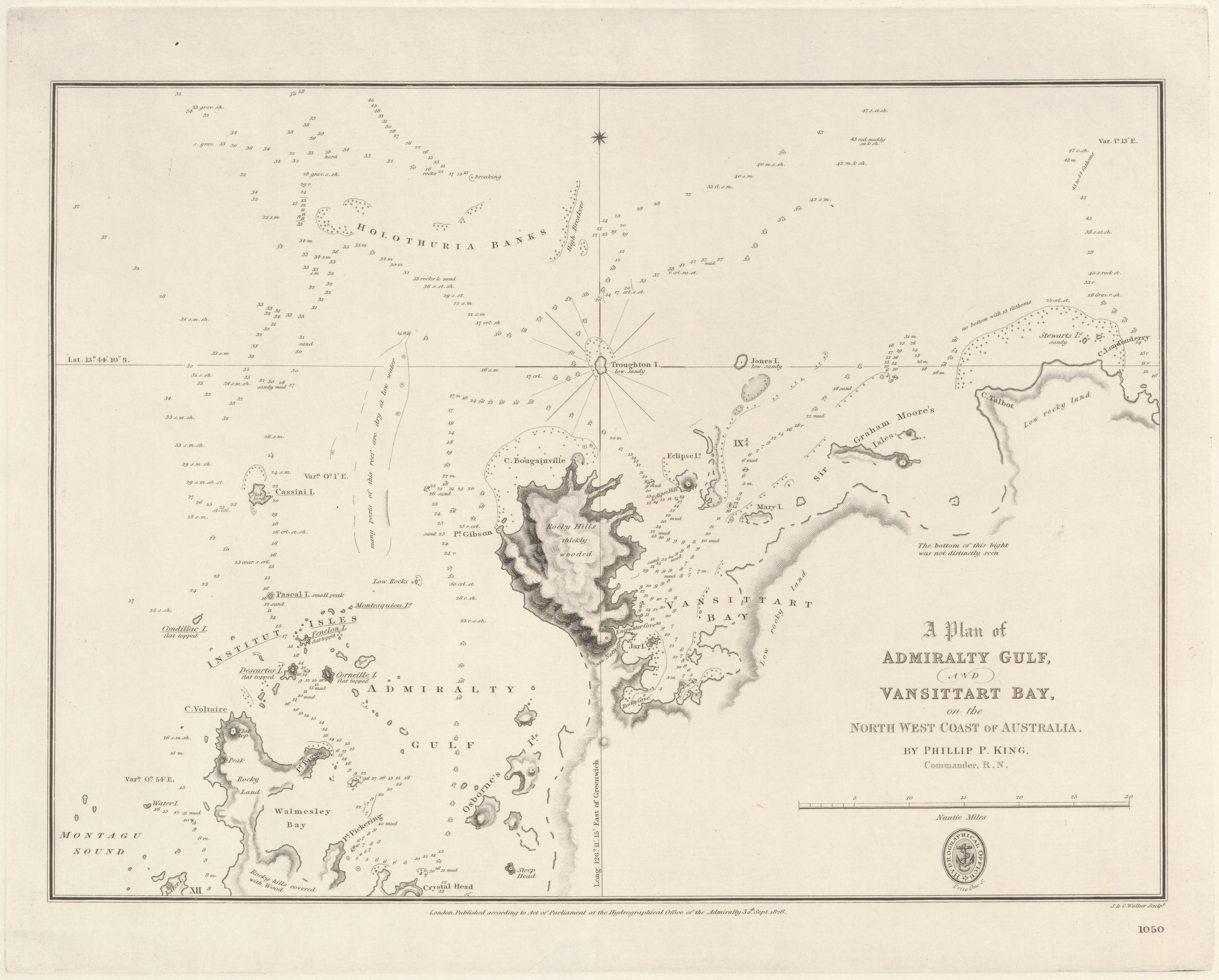
1826 map of Vansittart Bay

== Navigation guide (1920) ==
The Australia Pilot published by the United States Hydrographic Office in 1920 described the bay as follows:

Vansittart Bay is the great indentation in the coastline westward of Napier Broome Bay, but neither the approaches to it nor the bay itself have yet been properly surveyed, so that the navigation of their waters should be undertaken with great caution.

The bay is approached from the northward by passing between Jones and Troughton Island, where the passage, about 12 miles across, is obstructed by Tait Bank, with 4 fathoms on it; thence a southerly course leads westward of Eclipse Island, the westernmost of three islands lying right across the entrance to the bay, and so into any of the harbors in the bay.

Or, approaching from the northeastward, a course can be steered to pass between Mary and Long Island after passing the entrance to Napier Broome Bay and the conspicuous 20-foot rock, northward of Mary Island.

The channel between the rocks off Mary Island, which are visible about 5 miles (height of eye, 10 feet), and the rocky patch off Long Island, is little more than 1 mile across, and in the center of it is a reef, the rocks on which dry about 20 feet and are visible at about 1 mile less than those off Mary Island, which narrows the pass on either side to about 1,000 yards; but that to the westward is very foul, and should not be attempted; the depths in the eastern channel vary from 7 to 12 fathoms.

Between Mary Island and the easternmost point of Bougainville Peninsula, which forms the western side of Vansittart Bay, the entrance is about 7 miles across, and within this line the bay opens out considerably over the whole of its area; the coast along both shores is much broken and indented, forming many convenient anchorages and shelters.

Eastern shore of Vansittart Bay.—From abreast Mary Island the coast has a general southerly direction, although it is broken by a great peninsula extending for about 4 miles in an eastward and westward direction, forming two bays; but this side has not yet been examined sufficiently to give details.

The head of the bay, inclosed between the end of the above mentioned peninsula and Jar Island, due westward of it, is a spacious area, foul on both sides, especially the western, and not of any great depth in any part.

Low Island lies across the entrance to this southern section of Vansittart Bay, and is southward of the end of the dividing peninsula, a narrow pass with a maximum depth of 6 feet and very foul separating them. Westward of Low Island the depths are greater and the pass is wide, but ships would do well to avoid this part of the bay.

Western shore of Vansittart Bay.—The western shore of Vansittart Bay, though more broken, is generally clearer than the eastern side, and along it are four or five more or less commodious harbors.

Depths. The main part of Vansittart Bay has been sounded and shows moderate depths; the 5-fathom curve on the eastern side is some distance from the shore especially in the northern part, but the western side may be steep-to.

Eclipse Islands lie in the approach to Vansittart Bay, about 114 miles eastward of Cape Bougainville. The easternmost two of this group together extend northward and southward 7 miles, their greatest breadth being about 1 mile; they are separated by a small opening with a rock in it, at 3 miles from the northern extremity of the islands. The southern island is of a rugged aspect, and formed principally of large water-worn masses of sandstone.

Reefs, which dry in patches at low water, connect Eclipse Islands with Jones Island to the northward.

Water may be obtained near the northern end of Long Island, the southernmost Eclipse Island, from a well about mile from the beach. The natives were hostile at the time of the survey, in 1884. Eclipse Hill Island, 2 miles westward of Long Island, is about 6 miles in circumference, and rises to a flat-topped hill, 281 feet high, which, being more elevated than the land near it, is a good mark. Eclipse Hill Island, with the reef extending northward, forms the eastern side of the western entrance into Vansittart Bay.

Directions. Vessels approaching Vansittart Bay from the eastward should take Troughton Passage, between Troughton and Jones Island, which has been surveyed as far in as Cape Bougainville, whence nothing is known beyond what is shown on the chart. Bearings of Troughton and Jones Islands will check the position of a vessel approaching, and the southern extremity of Troughton Island bearing southward of 255° will lead northward of Tait Bank, which has a least depth of 4 fathoms.
