= Mary Island (Western Australia) =

Island on Kimberley coast of Western Australia

Mary Island (13°59′49″S 126°22′47″E) is located off the Kimberley coast of Western Australia.

It is in Vansittart Bay in the Cape Bouganville Aboriginal Reserve, between Admiralty Gulf and Napier Broome Bay.

== Climate ==
The island has a tropical savanna climate (Köppen: Aw); with a short wet season from December to mid-April and a long dry season from mid-April to November. Climate data was sourced from the nearest weather station at the Mungalalu Truscott Airbase on the mainland. Extreme temperatures ranged from 40.5 °C (104.9 °F) on 28 October 2018 to 9.6 °C (49.3 °F) on 11 July 2007. The wettest recorded day was 16 March 2005 with 438.0 mm (17.24 in) of rainfall.

Climate data for Mungalalu Truscott Airbase (14.09°S 126.39°E) (51 m (167 ft) AMSL) (2004-2025)
Month	Jan	Feb	Mar	Apr	May	Jun	Jul	Aug	Sep	Oct	Nov	Dec	Year
Record high °C (°F)	37.3 (99.1)	37.7 (99.9)	37.7 (99.9)	37.3 (99.1)	36.7 (98.1)	35.2 (95.4)	35.7 (96.3)	36.3 (97.3)	39.4 (102.9)	40.5 (104.9)	39.3 (102.7)	38.9 (102.0)	40.5 (104.9)
Mean daily maximum °C (°F)	32.1 (89.8)	32.3 (90.1)	32.7 (90.9)	33.4 (92.1)	32.1 (89.8)	30.5 (86.9)	30.8 (87.4)	32.0 (89.6)	33.4 (92.1)	34.5 (94.1)	35.1 (95.2)	34.3 (93.7)	32.8 (91.0)
Mean daily minimum °C (°F)	25.4 (77.7)	25.5 (77.9)	25.2 (77.4)	24.2 (75.6)	21.4 (70.5)	19.1 (66.4)	18.3 (64.9)	19.0 (66.2)	22.0 (71.6)	24.7 (76.5)	26.1 (79.0)	26.1 (79.0)	23.1 (73.6)
Record low °C (°F)	21.1 (70.0)	21.1 (70.0)	20.7 (69.3)	17.0 (62.6)	13.4 (56.1)	10.8 (51.4)	9.6 (49.3)	12.4 (54.3)	15.5 (59.9)	19.0 (66.2)	21.2 (70.2)	20.9 (69.6)	9.6 (49.3)
Average precipitation mm (inches)	346.5 (13.64)	267.4 (10.53)	204.4 (8.05)	67.3 (2.65)	17.9 (0.70)	3.7 (0.15)	1.9 (0.07)	0.3 (0.01)	0.6 (0.02)	16.8 (0.66)	41.3 (1.63)	196.3 (7.73)	1,134.8 (44.68)
Average precipitation days (≥ 0.2 mm)	18.7	14.8	13.6	5.7	1.5	0.6	0.5	0.9	0.7	1.7	5.0	11.1	74.8
Source: Bureau of Meteorology (2004-2025)
