= Ngardi language =

Australian Aboriginal language

Ngardi
- Ngarti
- Native to: Australia
- Region: Northern Territory and Western Australia
- Ethnicity: Ngardi
- Native speakers: 3 (2016 census)
- Language family: Pama–Nyungan: Ngumbin? Wati?; Ngardi

Language codes
- ISO 639-3: rxd
- Glottolog: ngar1288
- AIATSIS: A121
- ELP: Ngardi

Ngardi, also spelt Ngarti or Ngardilj, is an Australian Aboriginal language that is considered moribund. It was previously thought to be an alternative name for the Bunara language, but these are now classified as separate languages. It was/is spoken by the Ngardi people of the Northern Territory and northern Western Australia.

== Classification ==
Capell (1962) considered Ngardi, Warlpiri, and Warlmanpa to be dialects of a single language. R. M. W. Dixon (2002) grouped Ngardi together with Warlpiri and Warlmanpa in the Yapa group, but admitted that this was based on limited data. McConvell and Laughren (2004) showed that it was in Ngumbin, a closely related group, and this was followed in Honeyman (2005). However, Bowern (2011) listed it as a more distant Wati language.

Tindale shows Ngardi as an alternative name for Bunara language, but Lynette Oates and Arthur Capell showed that Bunara was a separate language. The two languages have now been assigned separate code in AIATSIS's AUSTLANG database.

== Waringari ==
Some old recordings and manuscripts refer to Waringari (or Waiangara) as a language related to Ngardi, but linguists have agreed that it is a geographical name and not the name of a language. Norman Tindale listed Waringari as a pejorative name for the Ngarti people, as well as for the Yeidji, the Worla and the Warlpiri, suggesting that they were cannibals.

== Phonology ==
=== Vowels ===
	Front	Back
High	i	u
Low	a	

=== Consonants ===
		Peripheral		Laminal	Apical	
		Bilabial	Velar	Palatal	Alveolar	Retroflex
Occlusive	oral	p	k	c	t	ʈ
Occlusive	nasal	m	ŋ	ɲ	n	ɳ
Continuant	median	w		j	r	ɻ
Continuant	lateral			ʎ	l	ɭ

== See also ==
- Ngururrpa, a grouping of peoples of language groups including Ngardi
