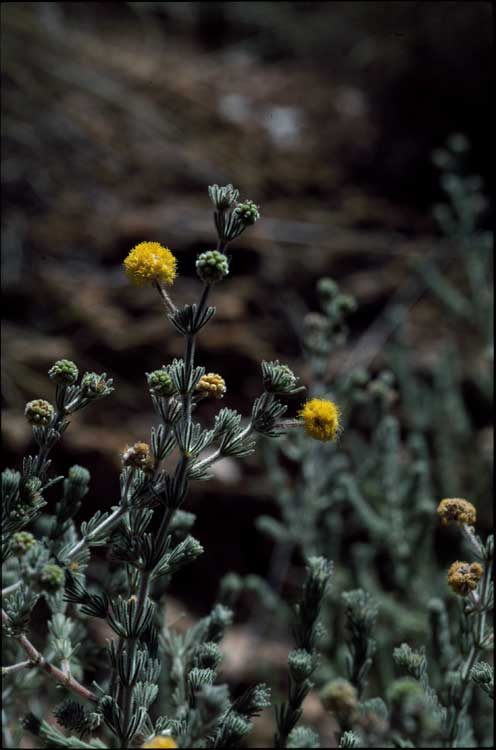

Scientific classification
- Kingdom: Plantae
- Clade: Tracheophytes
- Clade: Angiosperms
- Clade: Eudicots
- Clade: Rosids
- Order: Fabales
- Family: Fabaceae
- Subfamily: Caesalpinioideae
- Clade: Mimosoid clade
- Genus: Acacia
- Species: A. orthotricha

Binomial name
- Acacia orthotricha Pedley
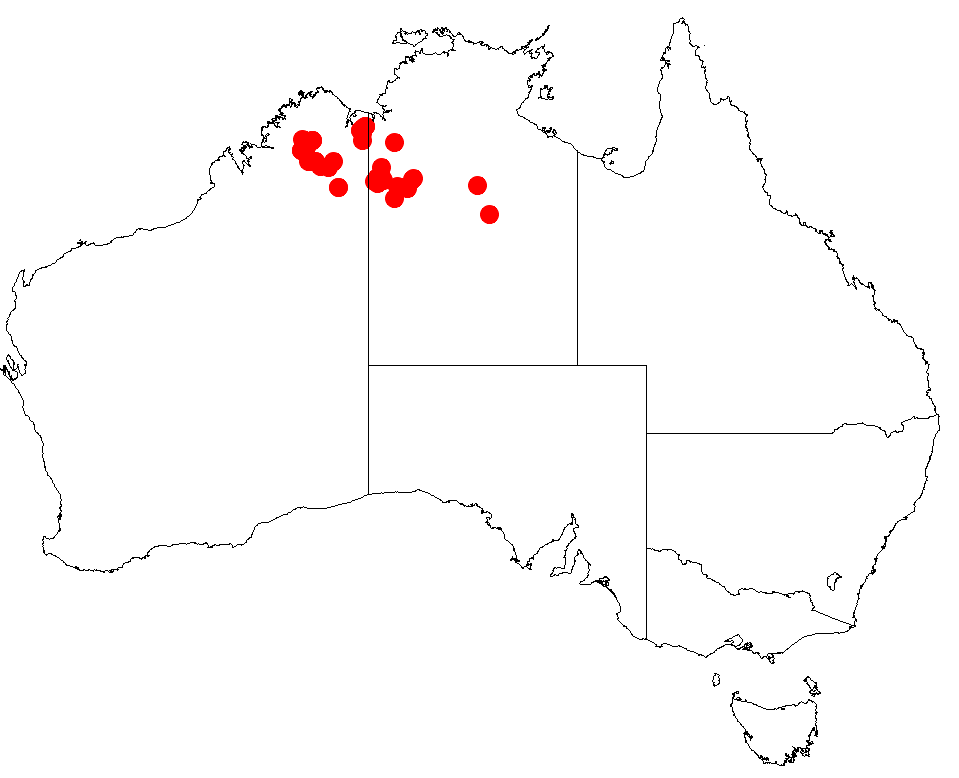
- Occurrence data from AVH

Synonyms
- Racosperma orthotrichum (Pedley) Pedley

= Acacia orthotricha =

Species of legume

Acacia orthotricha is a species of flowering plant in the family Fabaceae, and is endemic to the north-west of Australia. It is a small shrub with hairy branchlets, whorled, deeply grooved phyllodes, heads of yellow flowers and linear pods.

== Description ==
Acacia orthotricha is a small, greyish shrub that typically grows to a height of less that 1 m (3 ft 3 in) and has long, spreading hairs on its branchlets. Its phyllodes are arranged in whorls of 7 to 11, slightly flattened and deeply grooved, 4–7.5 mm (0.16–0.30 in) long and covered with soft, more or less erect hairs. The flowers are arranged in heads of 25 to 35 on hairy peduncles 5–10 mm (0.20–0.39 in) long. Flowering occurs in June, and the pods are linear, up to 60 mm (2.4 in) long, 9–13 mm (0.35–0.51 in) wide and glabrous but sticky. Mature seeds have not been seen.

== Taxonomy ==
Acacia orthotricha was first formally described in 1972 by Leslie Pedley in Contributions from the Queensland Herbarium from specimens collected about 20 mi (32 km) west of Inverway Station in 1952. The specific epithet (orthotricha) means 'hair-fruited' referring to the hairy plant.

== Distribution and habitat ==
This species of wattle grows on plains in lateritic soil in open shrubland between Mount Elizabeth Station, Tableland Station and Kununurra in Western Australia, and Inverway Station in the Northern Territory in the Central Kimberley, Northern Kimberley, Ord Victoria Plain and Victoria Bonaparte bioregions of north-western Australia.

== See also ==
- List of Acacia species
