= Elkin Umbagai =

Australian educationist

- Born: 19 February 1921
- Died: 24 January 1980 (aged 58)
- Citizenship: Australian
- Occupations: Leader and Educationist

Elkin Umbagai (19 February 1921 – 24 January 1980) was an Aboriginal Australian leader and educationalist. Born in a Presbyterian Mission in the Kunmunya Aboriginal Reserve in Western Australia, Umbagai's family mediated between missionaries and Aboriginal groups, and according to the Australian Dictionary of Biography she was "reputed to be the first Australian to receive the interpreter's badge of the Girl Guides Association". After marrying in a Christian marriage ceremony in 1969, Umbagai and her family founded the Mowanjum Aboriginal Community outside Derby, Western Australia.

Maisie McKenzie wrote in “The Road to Mowanjum” 1969 that Missionary Jim Hartshorn organized the Worora group to decide among themselves regarding the move from Wotjulum to the outskirts of Derby. Worora man, David Mowaljarlai named the area ‘Mowanjum’ a Worora word meaning ‘settled at last’ or equally ‘on firm ground.’ This was inspired by Worora man, Alan Mungulu's sermon regarding the children of Israel arrival and settling in the Promise land. [2]

There she became a pioneering educator in linguistics, archaeology and anthropology, and was a translator between English and Worrorra.
