= Umiida =

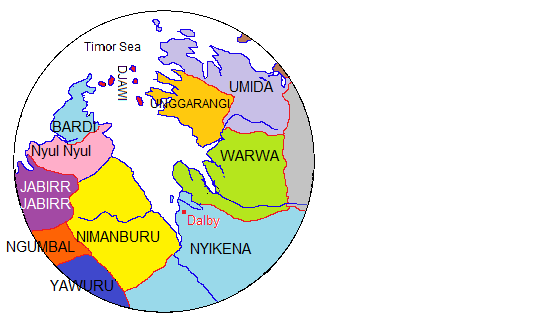
Traditional lands of Aboriginal tribes around Derby, WA

The Umiida, also written Umida and Umede, were an Aboriginal Australian people of the Kimberley region of north Western Australia.

== Language ==
The Umiida spoke one of the dialects of the (western) Worrorra language. What little is known of it, and Ungarrangu, was taken down by Howard Coate in the 1960s.

== Country ==
Norman Tindale's estimate of their tribal domains assigns them 1,800 square miles (4,700 km^{2}), along the Yampi Sound coastline and its inlets, as far south as Cone Bay. In a northerly direction, they possessed the islands from Koolan to Macleay. Their westward extension went as far as Bathurst Island, Bayliss Island, and those in Strickland Bay. Their inland domains went only as far as the watershed.

== Social organization and life ==
The Umiida were a nomadic rafter people who harvested the maritime resources off the many islands in their area, together with the Djaui and Unggarranggu, tribes with whom they had amicable relations.

== Mythology ==
Like other Worrorra neighbouring peoples the Umiida belonged to Wandjina/Wunggurr cultural complex where the Dreaming imagined both wandjina, fresh-water creator beings who were custodians of key sites, and a common Worrorran rainbow serpent Wunggurr.

== History of contact ==
A number of the Umiida were removed to Beagle Bay and died there. People of part Umiida descent are known to live in Broome.

== Alternative names ==
- Umeda, Umidi
- Aobidai (Unggarranggu exonym)
- Umi:da
- Oken
- Okat
- Okwata
- Okata, Okada (an alternative Umiida autonym, used by the Unggarranggu for the language both shared)

== Sources ==
- "AIATSIS map of Indigenous Australia". AIATSIS. 14 May 2024.
- "Tindale Tribal Boundaries" (PDF). Department of Aboriginal Affairs, Western Australia. September 2016. Archived from the original (PDF) on 8 March 2016.
- Bowern, Claire (2016). "Language and land in the Northern Kimberley" (PDF). In Austin, Peter K.; Koch, Harold; Simpson, Jane (eds.). Language, land & song: Studies in honour of Luise Hercus. EL Publishing. pp. 277–286. ISBN 978-0-728-60406-3.
- McGregor, William B. (2013). The Languages of the Kimberley, Western Australia. Routledge. ISBN 978-1-134-39602-3.
- Tindale, Norman Barnett (1974). "Umede (WA)". Aboriginal Tribes of Australia: Their Terrain, Environmental Controls, Distribution, Limits, and Proper Names. Australian National University. ISBN 978-0-708-10741-6. Archived from the original on 20 March 2020.
