= Donny Woolagoodja =

Australian indigenous artist

- Born: 1947; Western Australia
- Died: 2022 (aged 74–75)
- Other name: Yornadaiyn Woolagoodja
- Awards: Red Ochre Award

Yornadaiyn (Donny) Woolagoodja (1947-2022) was an Aboriginal Australian artist. He was a member of the Worrorra people of the Kimberley area of Western Australia.

== Career ==
Woolagoodja was the first chairman of the Mowanjum Artists Centre. Woolagoodja's giant Wandjina artwork featured at the opening ceremony of the Sydney 2000 Olympic Games. Similar works were also featured at the 2016 Vivid Sydney festival's Lighting of the Sails celebration.

== Personal ==
Donny Woolagoodja was born in 1947 at the Kunmunya Mission on the Kimberley coast, the son of Sam Woolagoodja. Woolagoodja died in 2022 aged 75.

== Honours and awards ==
- 2021 Red Ochre Award - Australia Council for the Arts
- 2022 Adelaide Festival Awards for Literature NonFiction Award, shortlisted

== Publications ==
- Blundell, Valda; Woolagoodja, Donny (2005). Keeping the Wanjinas fresh : Sam Woolagoodja and the enduring power of Lalai. Fremantle, W.A.: Fremantle Arts Centre Press. ISBN 1-920731-68-7. OCLC 60406302.
- Woolagoodja, Yornadaiyn (2020). Yornadaiyn Woolagoodja. Magabala Books Aboriginal Corporation. ISBN 978-1-925936-16-2. OCLC 1175678148.
