= Kambure =

Indigenous people of Western Australia

The Kambure, more commonly known now as Gamberre, were an Aboriginal Australian people of the Kimberley region of Western Australia.

== Language ==
The Kambure spoke a dialect of Wunambal.

== Country ==
Norman Tindal estimated Kambure lands to extend over some 1,700 square miles (4,400 km^{2}) around the Admiralty Gulf, excluding the areas around the Osborne Islands. Their eastern boundary lay about Monger Creek in Napier Broome Bay. Their southern extension ran along the south rim of the King Edward River.

== History of contact ==
An area of Kambure territory had a sacred value for them in their dreaming yet was thought to require patrolling by the Australian Army. The compromise worked out was to enroll several Kambure boys as army scouts, who, knowing the lie of the land, could assist the special patrols in carrying out their coastal surveillance.

== People ==
The Kambure were a coastal people, who subsisted on marine products. One Kambure horde lived on Sir Graham Moore Island.

== Alternative names ==
- Kambera
- Kamberange
- Kanbre, Gambre
- Barurungari ('upland/plateau people')
- Kambumiri
- Purungari (a Worrorra exonym meaning 'coast people')

== Sources ==
- "AIATSIS map of Indigenous Australia". AIATSIS. 14 May 2024.
- "Tindale Tribal Boundaries" (PDF). Department of Aboriginal Affairs, Western Australia. September 2016. Archived from the original (PDF) on 8 March 2016.
- Dixon, Robert M. W. (2002). Australian Languages: Their Nature and Development. Vol. 1. Cambridge University Press. ISBN 978-0-521-47378-1.
- Holmes-Eber, Paula (2016). "Dealing with Cultural differences". In Lucius, Gerard; Rietjens, Sebastiaan (eds.). Effective Civil-Military Interaction in Peace Operations: Theory and Practice. Springer. pp. 191–204. ISBN 978-3-319-26806-4.
- Stuart, E. J. (1923). Land of opportunities: Being an Account of the Author's Recent Expedition to Explore the Northern Territories of Australia (PDF). Bodley Head.
- Tindale, Norman Barnett (1974). "Kambure (WA)". Aboriginal Tribes of Australia: Their Terrain, Environmental Controls, Distribution, Limits, and Proper Names. Australian National University. ISBN 978-0-708-10741-6. Archived from the original on 20 March 2020.
