= Bunara language =

Pama–Ngungan language of Australia

Bunara
- Native to: Australia
- Region: Northern Territory and Western Australia
- Ethnicity: Bunara people
- Native speakers: 14 (2006)
- Language family: Pama–Nyungan: Ngumbin? Wati?; Bunara

Language codes
- ISO 639-3: None (mis)
- AIATSIS: A69

The Bunara language is a Pama–Nyungan language spoken by the Bunara people. It was previously thought to be an alternative name of the Ngardi language by Tindale (1974), but newer sources treat Bunara and Ngardi as separate languages.
