= Mowanjum Community =

Community in Western Australia

Mowanjum Western Australia
- Coordinates: 17.356°S 123.701°E
- Population: 311 (2016)
- Location: 10 km (6 mi) south east of Derby, Western Australia
- LGA(s): Shire of Derby-West Kimberley
- State electorate(s): Kimberley
- Federal division(s): Durack
Mean max temp	Mean min temp	Annual rainfall
33.9 °C; 93 °F	21.7 °C; 71 °F	622.4 mm 24.5 in

Mowanjum is a medium-sized Aboriginal community, located 10 km (6 mi) south east of Derby in the Kimberley region of Western Australia, within the Shire of Derby-West Kimberley. At the 2016 Australian census, Mowanjum had a population of 311.

The settlement began after the establishment of a mission station by the Presbyterian Church in 1912, first called the Port George IV mission and later Kunmunya.

== History ==
After an initial attempt to set up a mission near Walcott Inlet by Dr. John Yule had been abandoned by the lay missionaries who followed, Robert and Frances Wilson, owing to lack of fresh water at the site, a fresh site was sought. In 1912 Rev. R.H. Wilson and his party selected a new site at Port George IV, not far away. Within a few more years, sometime before 1930, this site too had to be abandoned, owing to lack of water and arable land, with the new site known as Kunmunya.

Rev. J.R.B. Love was in important figure in the history of the mission, although he was away from the outbreak of World War I in 1914, when he enlisted in the First Australian Imperial Force (A.I.F.) in 1914, and only returned in 1927. He subsequently remained as superintendent until 1941. Love translated the gospel of Saint Mark and Saint Luke into the Worrorra language, and mission children were taught in both English and Worrorra.

In 1949, the land, livestock and equipment of Munja Aboriginal Cattle Station was handed over to the missionaries, which overstretched the capacity of the missionaries. In the meantime, Kumunya experienced crop failures, and after deliberations among the various groups, they all relocated in 1951 to Wotjulum, near Yampi Sound, about 130 kilometres (80 mi) south-west of Port George, near Coppermine Estuary. finally to the outskirts of Derby near the airport in 1956.

The name Mowanjum was inscribed in the Derby marsh in 1956 by David Mowaljarlai. It means "settled" or "on firm ground. The three men attributed to founding the Mowanjum Community are Albert Barunga, Alan Mungulu and David Mowaljarlai.

The community was again shifted in 1975 to its present site 10 km (6.2 mi) east of Derby, following government requirements for additional land for the Derby Airport.

== Description ==
Strong links to traditional country have been preserved and the numerous outstations, including Pantijan, Kunmunya, Dodnun and Yallon, are directly linked to both European and traditional history. Mowanjum's outstations are under Mowanjum community management. Mowanjum includes people from three main language groups:

- Wunambal
- Worrora
- Ngarinyin

Between 300 and 500 people reside at Mowanjum Community depending on seasonal conditions in surrounding language group areas.

== Art and culture ==
Mowanjum Community has its own art and cultural organisation, the Mowanjum Aboriginal Art & Culture Centre (MASWAC). It was founded in 1998 by Mowanjum Community Administrator Maxine Clarke, Mowanjum Kimberley TAFE Arts lecturer Mark Norval, and its first chairperson Donny Woolagoodja. In 2002 community administrator John Oster and MASWAC compiled a business plan to build a gallery-museum at Mowanjum. During 2004 and 2006 this new art centre was constructed.

The artists from MASWAC have had major exhibitions across the country and overseas. Wandjina artists since the formation of MASWAC include Donny Woolagoodja, Mabel King, Gordon Barunga, Sandra Mungulu and Leah Umbagai, while prior to MASWAC, there were Wattie Karrawarra, Jack Wheera, Charlie Numblemoore, Alan Mungulu, David Mowaljarlai, Sam Woolagoodja, Spider Burgu, Paddy Morlumbun, Guduwola Mungulu and Pudjuwola Barunga.

The Mowanjum Arts and Cultural Festival is one of Australia's longest-running Indigenous festivals, having run annually since 1998.

== Governance ==
The community is managed through its incorporated body, Mowanjum Aboriginal Corporation, incorporated under the Aboriginal Councils and Associations Act 1976 on 23 January 1981.

== Town planning ==
Mowanjum Layout Plan No.1 was prepared in accordance with State Planning Policy 3.2 Aboriginal Settlements. Layout Plan No.1 was endorsed by the community on 23 July 2003 and the Western Australian Planning Commission on 23 September 2003. It has had several amendments since.

== Notable people ==
- Elkin Umbagai (1921–1980), community co-founder, leader, and educator
- Vinka Barunga, who grew up in Mowanjum and Derby, graduated from the University of Western Australia with an MBBS in 2016, and is the first Worrora doctor and the first Aboriginal doctor in Derby.
