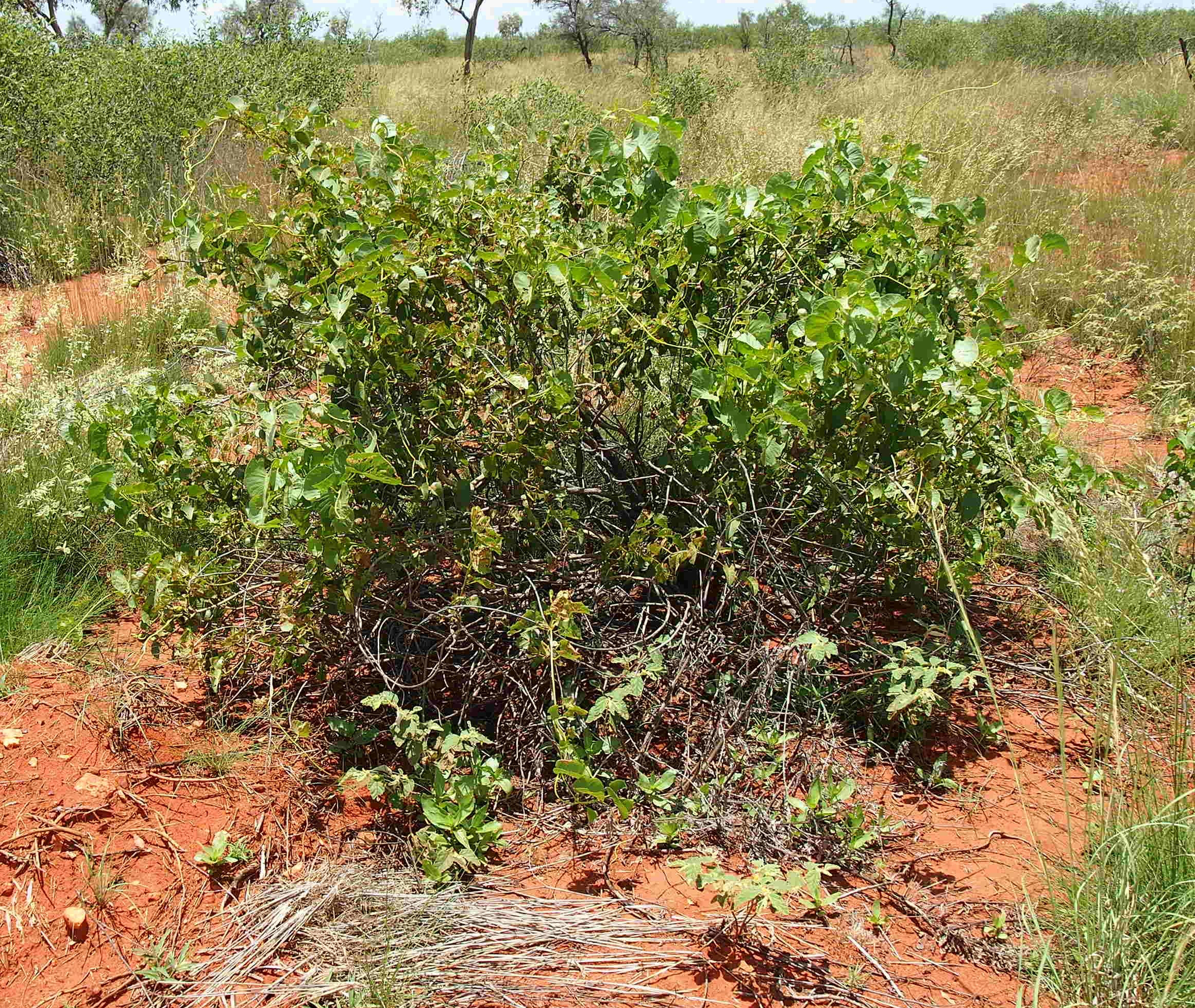

Scientific classification
- Kingdom: Plantae
- Clade: Tracheophytes
- Clade: Angiosperms
- Clade: Eudicots
- Clade: Asterids
- Order: Solanales
- Family: Convolvulaceae
- Genus: Ipomoea
- Species: I. costata

Binomial name
- Ipomoea costata Benth.

= Ipomoea costata =

Species of plant

Ipomoea costata, commonly known as rock morning glory, is an Australian native plant. It is found in northern Australia, from Western Australia, through the Northern Territory, to Queensland. Its tubers provide a form of bush tucker to some Aboriginal peoples, known as bush potato, or (to the Ngururrpa groups in WA), karnti.

== Description ==
It is a prostrate or climbing perennial growing up to 3 m high, with purple-blue-pink flowers from February to November. Juvenile form is a vine, maturing into a woody-stemmed shrub with vine-like stems. Leaves are broad and leathery, 4-9 cm long. Tubers are rounded, 12-20 cm long by 5-18 cm wide, with a single plant potentially having up to twenty tubers.

== Habitat ==
It occurs on sandy or rocky soils, often over limestone, and on spinifex sand plains in northern Australia.

== Uses ==
It is the source of bush potato, a bush tucker food for Aboriginal people. Bush potatoes are cooked on the warm earth under coals, and are peeled when cooked.

== Aboriginal names ==
In Central Australia, I. costata is also known to Aboriginal people by the following names:

- Alyawarr: anaty
- Anmatyerr: anaty or anek
- Eastern Arrernte: anatye
- Western Arrernte: natye
- Pintupi: ala or yala
- Warlpiri: karnti or paparda
