= Low Rocks and Sterna Island Important Bird Area =

Islands in Western Australia

Coordinates: 14°05′37″S 125°47′23″E

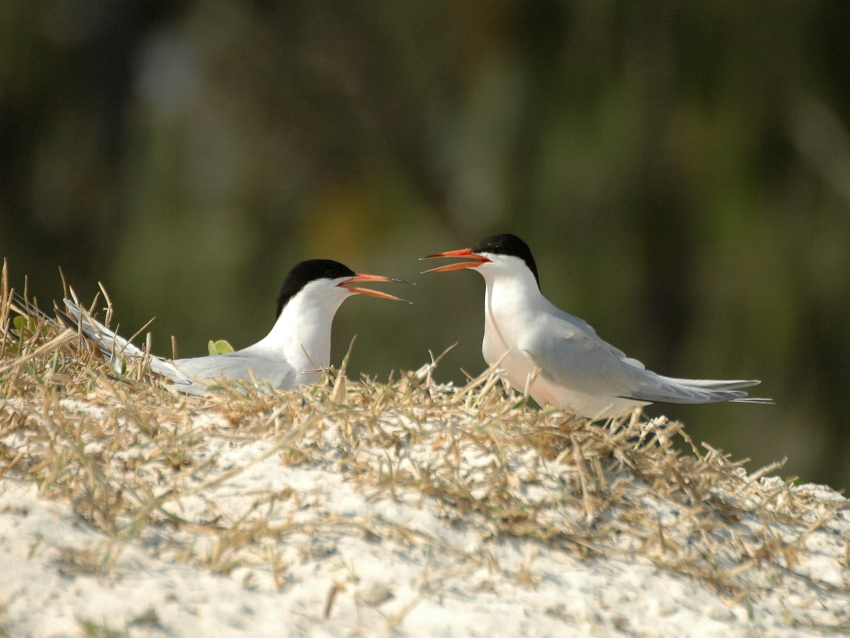
The islands are important breeding sites for roseate terns

The Low Rocks and Sterna Island Important Bird Area comprises two islets lying about 14 km apart and with a collective area of 14 ha, in the Montesquieu group of islands, in the mouth of Admiralty Gulf in the Kimberley region of Western Australia.

== Description ==
Low Rocks is a 4 ha islet with a covering of grass and low scrub. Sterna's vegetation is dominated by pindan wattle and Triodia microstachya, but there are also bare sandstone ledges used by nesting seabirds. Low Rocks is a nature reserve, while Sterna is unallocated crown land. Average annual rainfall in the area is about 900 mm.

== Birds ==
The islands have been identified by BirdLife International as an Important Bird Area (IBA) because they support over 1% of the world population of roseate terns, with up to 4000 breeding pairs using the site. Other seabirds recorded as breeding in the IBA include crested and lesser crested terns, and pied cormorants.
