= Wunambal language =

Aboriginal Australian language of Western Australia

Wunambal
- Northern Worroran
- Native to: Australia
- Region: Western Australia
- Ethnicity: Wunambal, Kambure, Yeidji, Miwa, ?Wilawila
- Native speakers: 4 (2021 census)
- Language family: Worrorran: Wunambal
- Dialects: Yiiji; Gunin; Miwa; Wilawila; Gambera †; Wunambal
- Writing system: Latin

Language codes
- ISO 639-3: Variously: wub – Wunambal (Yeidji, Yiiji) gma – Gamberre (Gambera) gww – Kwini (Gunin) vmi – Miwa wil – Wilawila (unconfirmed)
- Glottolog: nort2751
- AIATSIS: K22 Wunambal, K32 Yiiji, K39 Gambera, K36 Gunin, K44 Miwa, K35 Wilawila
- ELP: Wunambal; Gunin
- Map showing Worrorran languages

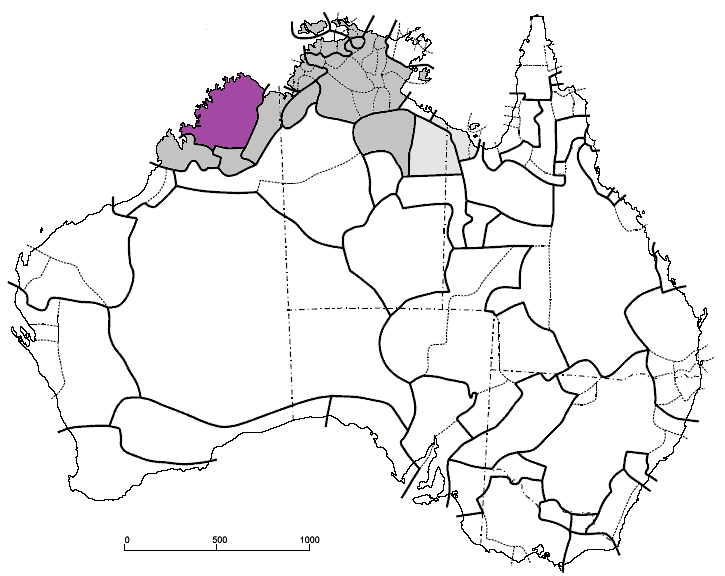
- Worrorran languages (purple), among other non-Pama-Nyungan languages (grey)

The Wunambal language, also known as Northern Worrorran, Gamberre, or Gambera, is a moribund Australian Aboriginal language of Western Australia. It has several dialects, including Yiiji, Gunin, Miwa, and Wilawila (with Gaambera and Wunambal also distinguished as separate). It is spoken by the Wunambal people.

Wunambal is one of three Worrorran languages, the others being (Western) Worrorra and Ngarinyin (Eastern Worrorra, or Ungarinjin).

As of 2020, "Wunambal Gaambera" is part of a language revival project.

== Classification ==
Wunambal is a noun-classifying language that is part of the family of Northern Kimberley languages spoken by the Worrorra people of the north-west Kimberleys in Australia, an area home to remnant groups of Aboriginal Australians. It is one of three Worrorran languages, the others being (Western) Worrorra and Ngarinyin (Eastern Worrorra, or Ungarinjin), all of the "Northern Kimberley Division".

It has been classified by linguists as non-Pama-Nyungan; "Other adjacent non-Pama-Nyungan language families are Nyulnyulan to the south-west, Bunuban to the south, and Jarrakan to the east." Linguists classify Wunambal and its dialects as pronominal prefixing languages. Some have distinguished three sub-groupings of Worrorran as Wunambalic, Ungarinyinic, and Worrorric, further distinguished as Northern, Central and Southern. It is a polysynthetic language that is distinct in that "all of the linguistic varieties in the Worrorran language family have noun classes" and "verbs that take subject and object prefixes".

Wunambal has several dialects, some of which may sometimes be treated as separate languages:

- Wunambal proper (5 speakers in 2005)
- Gamberre (extinct by 2016)
- Kwini (Gunin) (1 speaker in 2005)
- Miwa (Bagu) (extinct)
- Yiidji (Forrest River) (maybe 10 speakers in 2005)
- ? Wilawila (extinct)
- ? Ginan (extinct)

Bowern (2012) lists three Northern Worrorran languages: Wunambal proper, Gamberre, and Gunin.

== Alternative names ==
Other names and spellings for Wunambal include Jeidji, Jeithi, Unambal, Wumnabal, Wunambullu, Yeidji, Yeithi.

== History ==
Wunambal's earliest noted documentation was in the early 20th century by J.R.B. Love.

Aboriginal peoples have occupied the Kimberleys for at least 40,000 years. The Wunambal peoples are members of their territory's descent group, and they are part of what is characterized as 'clan estates.' Their particular estate is termed guraa, inclusive of the Wunambal people and the Gaambera people.

After noted contact with Europeans, Worrorran peoples consisted of around 300. There were fewer than ten speakers of the Wunambal language in 2009.

=== Language revival ===
As of 2020, Wunambal Gaambera is listed as one of twenty languages prioritised as part of the Priority Languages Support Project, being undertaken by First Languages Australia and funded by the Department of Communications and the Arts. The project aims to "identify and document critically-endangered languages—those languages for which little or no documentation exists, where no recordings have previously been made, but where there are living speakers".

== Geographic distribution ==
=== Official status ===
Wunambal was originally spoken by the Worrorra people, who migrated from their original lands in the west Kimberley area from 1956. A continuum of these speakers ranges from "north of the Prince Regent River" to "as far north as Mt. Trafalgar".

This designation originates from the shared influences common to the area; it is through these same inferences that contributes to Wunambal phonology and syntax association with Worrorran and Ungarinyin.

=== Dialects/varieties ===
Subject to debate by some scholars, Wunambal dialects include Wunambal proper, Gamberre, Kwini, Miwa, Yiidji, Wilawila, and Ginan. In contention by linguists is that some of these dialects may be considered languages of their own, while remaining closely related. "Worrarran languages constitute a group of [20] or so of named varieties spoken in the Kimberley bloc"; owed to the many similarities and high degree of mutual intelligibility among the three associated languages of the Worrorra people.

== Phonology ==
There remain a few distinctive differences heard between Wunambal and its sister languages; personal history is a factor in these recognised differences. "This is a register of linguistically differentiated tribes, each with its own fixed point of geographic origin." Notably, Worrorran languages have cluster assimilation.

=== Consonants ===
The Wunambal language contrasts with other Kimberley languages in its contrast producing alveolar vs. post-alveolar sounds. Stops, nasals, laterals, rhotics, and glides are inclusive of manner of articulation: where voicing is not contrastive in stops. A table of consonant inventory and explanation of consonant production can be found in Wunambal: A language of the North-West Kimberley Region, Western Australia by TL. Carr.

Wunambal consonant phonemes
	Peripheral		Laminal	Apical	
	Labial	Velar	Palatal	Alveolar	Retroflex
Stop	p~b	k~ɡ	c~ɟ	t~d	ʈ~ɖ
Nasal	m	ŋ	ɲ	n	ɳ
Tap/trill				ɾ~r	
Lateral			ʎ	l	ɭ
Approximant	w		j	ɻ	

- Stop sounds can be heard ranging from voiceless to voiced.
- /r/ can be heard as a tap, or a trill, and when weakly articulated, it can be heard as a voiced fricative [ɹ̝].
- /ɻ/ can also range to an alveolar sound [ɹ].
- /c/ can be heard as a fricative [ç], or an affricate [tʃ] in various word-initial positions.
- /ɡ/ can be heard as [dʒ] when preceding a long vowel /iː/ in word-initial positions.

=== Vowels ===
Wunambal "has been analysed as a six vowel system with the contrasts /i e a o u ɨ/, with /ɨ/ only found in the Northern variety."

- /i, u/ can also be heard as [ɪ, ʊ]
- /ɨ/ can have three allophones; [ɨ], [ə], [ʉ].
- /aː/ can range to a back vowel sound [ɑː].

== Grammar ==
There are five noun classes in the northern half of Wunambal country and three in the southern half.

=== Morphology ===
Wunambal is polysynthetic; notably, Worrorran languages contain overarching concord.

A complete list of Wunambal class and case markers can be found in Notes on the Wunambal language by Arthur Capell (1941).

=== Syntax ===
As in all Northern Kimberley languages, they contain phenomena of simple and compound verbs, utilizing auxiliaries through conjugation: "certain verbs are conjugated by means of prefixes for person (and to a lesser degree tense), while suffixes are added to show aspect, mood, tense and voice." All Worrorran derived languages contain nominal classification, head-marking, and complex predication.

== Vocabulary ==
Northern Worrorran languages share vocabulary.

A 2011 publication, Uunguu plants and animals, Aboriginal biological knowledge from Wunambal Gaambera Country in the north-west Kimberley, Australia, gives words, descriptions and aboriginal uses of the plants and animals of Wunambal Gaambera country.
