= Admiralty Gulf =

Gulf in Kimberley region of Western Australia

Coordinates: 14°16′32″S 125°53′22″E

Location in Western Australia

Admiralty Gulf is a gulf in the Kimberley region of Western Australia that opens into the Indian Ocean.

== Description ==
The Gulf is bounded by the Bougainville Peninsula to the north and Bigge Point to the south. The nearest populated place is Kalumburu, located 82 kilometres (51 mi) to the east.

Many islands are found within the Gulf, including Middle Osborn Island, Kingsmill Island, Borda Island and the Montesquieu Islands (including the Low Rocks and Sterna Island Important Bird Area). Two natural harbours are found in the Gulf, Port Warrender and Walmesly Bay.

== History ==
The traditional owners of the areas around the gulf are the Wenamba peoples to the west and the Kambure peoples to the east.

Nicolas Baudin charted Cape Bougainville in 1803 and Cassini Island and was most likely the first European to visit the Gulf.

The coastline around the Gulf was explored by Philip Parker King aboard HMS Mermaid in 1819 as part of his survey of the area. King named the Gulf along with Port Warrender and Vansittart Bay.
