= Ngarinyin =

Aboriginal Australian people of northern Western Australia

The Ngarinyin or Ngarinjin are an Aboriginal Australian people of the Kimberley region of Western Australia. Their language, Ngarinyin, is also known as Ungarinyin. When referring to their traditional lands, they refer to themselves as Wilinggin people.

== Language ==
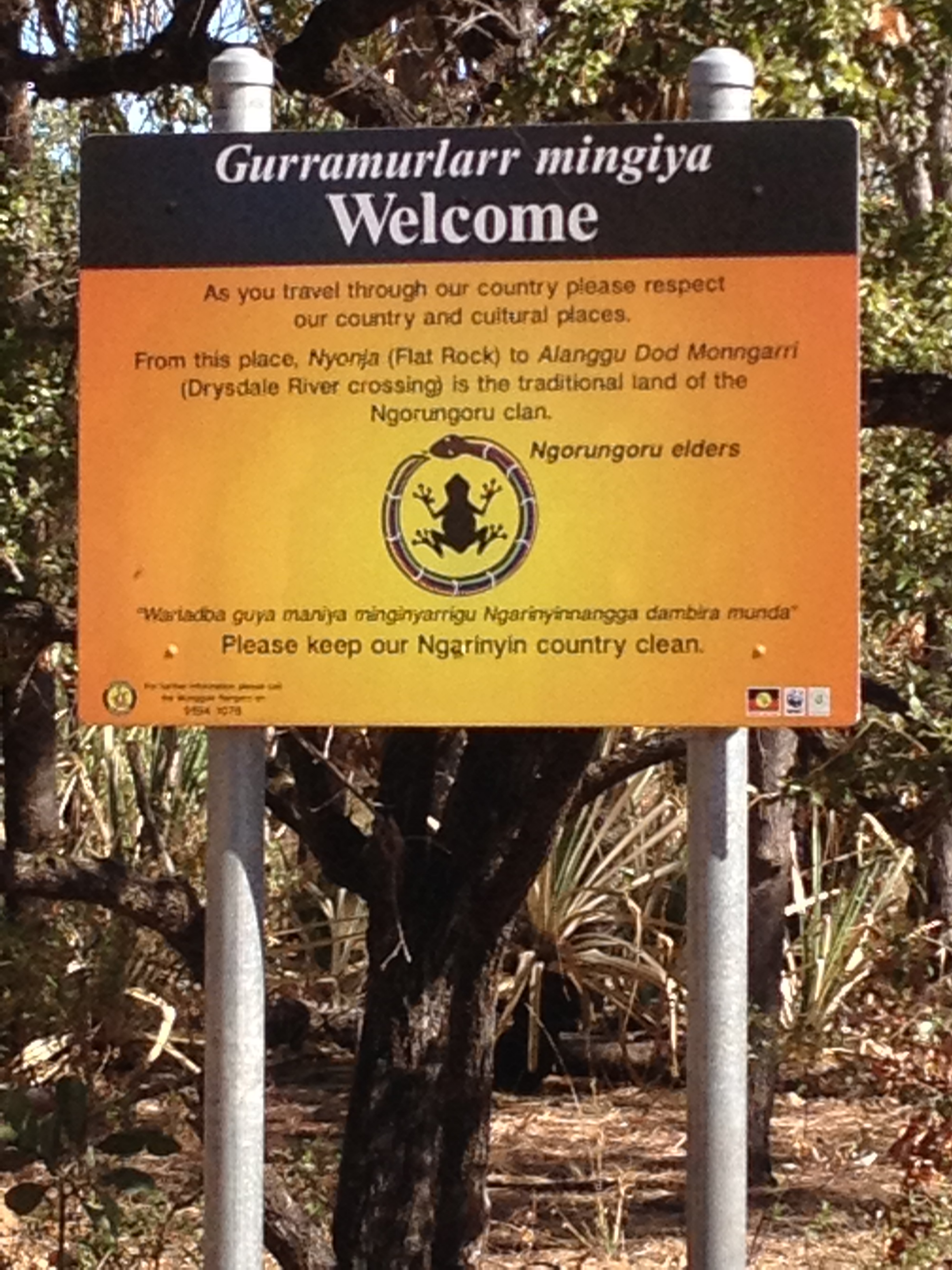
Sign in the Ngarinjin language

Ngarinyin, or Ungarinyin, is one of three languages belonging to the Worrorran language family. As of 2003 there were 82 speakers of Ngarinyin spread out from Derby to the King River. At the time of the 2016 Australian census, there were 38 people recorded to speak the language at home.

According to Rumsey, Ngarinyin may be applied to either the language or the people who speak it, whereas Ungarinyin may only refer to the language. McGregor reported that "Ngarinyin has been chosen as the preferred language name" by the community.

== Social organisation ==
The Ngarinjin were composed of roughly 40 groups. Each of these local divisions, with its own distinctive clan and moiety classification.

The Wunambal, Worrorra, and Ngarinyin peoples form a cultural bloc known Wanjina Wunggurr. The shared culture is based on the dreamtime mythology and law whose creators are the Wanjina and Wunggurr spirits, ancestors of these peoples. The Wunambal Gaambera Aboriginal Corporation represents the Wunambal Gaambera people; Uunguu refers to their "home", or country.

== Country ==
Ngarinjin lands were estimated by Norman Tindale to encompass some 27,000 square kilometres (10,500 sq mi) from Walcott Inlet at Mount Page. To the southeast their boundaries ran along the northern face of the Wunaamin Miliwundi Ranges. Their land included the Isdell Valley to Isdell Range, running east as far as the Phillips Range, the headwaters of the Chapman River, Blackfellow Creek, and Wood River. Their confines to the north lay along the Barnett and Harris Ranges, and to where the Gibb River joins with the upper Drysdale across to the Maitland Range. They were present also at the King River headwaters, as far as around about Mount Reid. Their western frontier was set at Mounts Bradshaw and Han. Their territory to the southeast reached Mount French on the highlands.

Before the coming of white settlement, it appears that the Ngarinjin were pressing south into territory held by the Punaba.

=== Native title ===
As part of the same native title claim lodged in 1998 by Wanjina Wunggurr RNTBC known as the Dambimangari claim, which included claims for the three peoples in the cultural bloc, referred to as Dambimangari, Uunguu and Wilinggin (see above), the Wilinggin claim was the first to be determined, by litigation on 27 August 2004. The claim covers an area of more than 60,150 km^{2} (23,220 sq mi) along the Gibb River Road.

Another claim, over 6,903 km^{2} (2,665 sq mi) in the Shire of Wyndham-East Kimberley, filed on 30 December 2002, was not accepted, with the determination handed down on 31 January 2003. The Kimberley Land Council Aboriginal Corporation represented the people in this claim.

The Wanjina Wunggurr RNTBC acts on behalf of the Ngarinyin/Wilinggin, Worrora/Dambimangari, and Wunambal Gaambera/Uunguu native title holders with regard to their rights and interests.

=== National park ===
In January 2017, the creation of the Wilinggin National Park was announced, which will include parts of the parts of the existing Mitchell River and Prince Regent National Parks and connect a number of conservation areas stretching over 200 km (120 mi). The new park would be jointly managed by the WA government and Wilinggin traditional owners. The area adjoins the northern portion of the former King Leopold Ranges Conservation Park which is now known as Wunaamin Conservation Park. The new park was planned to form part of the Kimberley National Park, which would be Australia's biggest national park, but this idea had as of 2020 been shelved after a change of government in 2017.

=== Indigenous rangers ===
In June 2023, the newly-established Darran.gu Wulagura women's Indigenous ranger team worked in collaboration with the Australian Wildlife Conservancy to survey the golden bandicoot population on Wilinggin country for the first time ever. The survey, which was carried out in the survey in the Charnley River-Artesian Range Wildlife Sanctuary, involved trapping, examining, and identifying individuals of the vulnerable species over six nights. The objective was to ensure that translocation of some of the animals to the Northern Territory would not negatively affect the existing population.

== Ethnography ==
The German ethnographer Helmut Petri, during the Frobenius expedition of 1938-1939, lived among the Ngarinjin and took copious notes on the lore language and mythology of the Ngarinjin, and gathered many objects of their traditional craftsmanship. A large part of his material, conserved in Frankfurt am Main, was obliterated during one of the many Allied bombing runs on that city, which razed to the ground the Museum der Weltkulturen, where Petri worked. (Note: 'Wertvolle Bestände, darunter ein großer Teil seiner Feldnotizen und Original texte von Mythen des Ungarinyin-Stammes, waren bei der Zerstörung des Instituts im Zweiten Weltkrieg vernichtet.')

== Alternative names ==
- Andedja
- Andidja
- Angarinjin
- Arawari (a Worrorran word meaning "southeastwards")
- Arkarinjindja
- Gular (a name applied to some groups, with kular meaning "west")
- Ingarinjindja (a Ngarinyin adult male)
- Marangana (of people who speak as the Ngarinyin do)
- Narrinyind
- Ngaring-ngyan
- Ngarinjin
- Ngerringun Kandjalngari (northern group)
- Njingarinjanja (a Ngarinyin adult female)
- Oladjau (Miriwung term for their language)
- (Ungarinjin, Unrjarinjin, Ungarinyin, Ungarinjen (Note: But, note above – should only be used with reference to the language, not the people.))
- Walmidi (Forrest River name)
- Wangarinjinu
- Warnarinjin

== Sources ==
- "AIATSIS map of Indigenous Australia". AIATSIS. 14 May 2024.
- Graves, B. (2003). "Wororan languages". In Frawley, William (ed.). International Encyclopedia of Linguistics: AAVE-Esperanto. Vol. 1. Oxford University Press. pp. 379–380. ISBN 978-0-195-13977-8.
- Michel, Thomas (1988). "Helmut Petri 1907–1986". Paideuma: Mitteilungen zur Kulturkunde. 34. Frobenius Institute: v–xiii. JSTOR 23076465.
- "Tindale Tribal Boundaries" (PDF). Department of Aboriginal Affairs, Western Australia. September 2016. Archived from the original (PDF) on 8 March 2016.
- Tindale, Norman Barnett (1974). "Ngarinjin (WA)". Aboriginal Tribes of Australia: Their Terrain, Environmental Controls, Distribution, Limits, and Proper Names. Australian National University. ISBN 978-0-708-10741-6. Archived from the original on 9 March 2020.
