= Ngurrara =

Grouping of Aboriginal Australian peoples of the Great Sandy Desert, Western Australia

The Ngurrara and Ngururrpa are overlapping groupings of Aboriginal Australian peoples of the Great Sandy Desert, in the central Pilbara and southern Kimberley regions of Western Australia. Both groups are represented by various Aboriginal corporations which look after their native title interests.

== Name ==
The ethnonym Ngurrara signifies "home". Ngururrpa means "our country in the middle".

== Country and people ==
The word Ngurrara refers to their native country, properly called Mawurritjiyi, the word for the Tanami Desert.

The Ngurrara comprise the Walmajarri, Wangkatjunga (aka Martu Wangka), Mangala and Juwaliny (a dialect of Walmajarri) language groups.

Peoples of the Walmajarri, Wangkatjunga, Ngarti and Kukatja language groups have called their country Ngururrpa.

== Native title ==
=== Ngurrara ===
In Kogolo v Western Australia (2007) the Ngurrara won recognition of their native title rights to 76,000 square kilometres (29,000 mi^{2}). They presented their case by drawing a large painting of their land, Ngurrara, inscribed with figures from their mythological history associated with various points. Their land is under the custodianship of the Yanunijarra Aboriginal Corporation.

There are several other native title claims under the Ngurrara name, some overlapping or shared with other groups, such as the Martu people.

Helicopter Tjungarrayi and Ors on behalf of the Ngurra Kayanta People v The State of Western Australia (2012) and Bobby West & Anor v State of Western Australia (2015), jointly known as the Ngurra Kayanta claim, was determined in 2016/7, granting native title over an area of 19,574.1497 square kilometres (7,557.6215 sq mi) in the Great Sandy Desert east of Karratha. Ngurra Kayanta (Aboriginal Corporation) RNTBC is the trustee for this land.

=== Ngururrpa ===
Ngururrpa is the name used for a native title claim to land in the Great Sandy Desert, nearer the border with the Northern Territory. In the case Payi Payi on behalf of the Ngururrpa People v The State of Western Australia (FCA 2113) on 18 October 2007, the Federal Court of Australia recognised the Ngururrpa people's exclusive native title rights over an area of over 29,600 square kilometres (11,400 sq mi). The Parna Ngururrpa (Aboriginal Corporation) is the RNTBC which acts as the trustee for the land.

== Indigenous Protected Areas ==
The Ngururrpa Indigenous Protected Area (IPA), covering an area of 29,600 square kilometres (11,400 sq mi) in the far eastern side of the Pilbara, in the Great Sandy Desert, was declared in October 2020. The IPA comprises the whole of the 2007 Ngururrpa Native Title Determination.

== See also ==
- Ngarluma language
