= Ngarinyin language =

Aboriginal Australian language of northern Western Australia

Ngarinyin
- Eastern Worrorran
- Ungarinjin
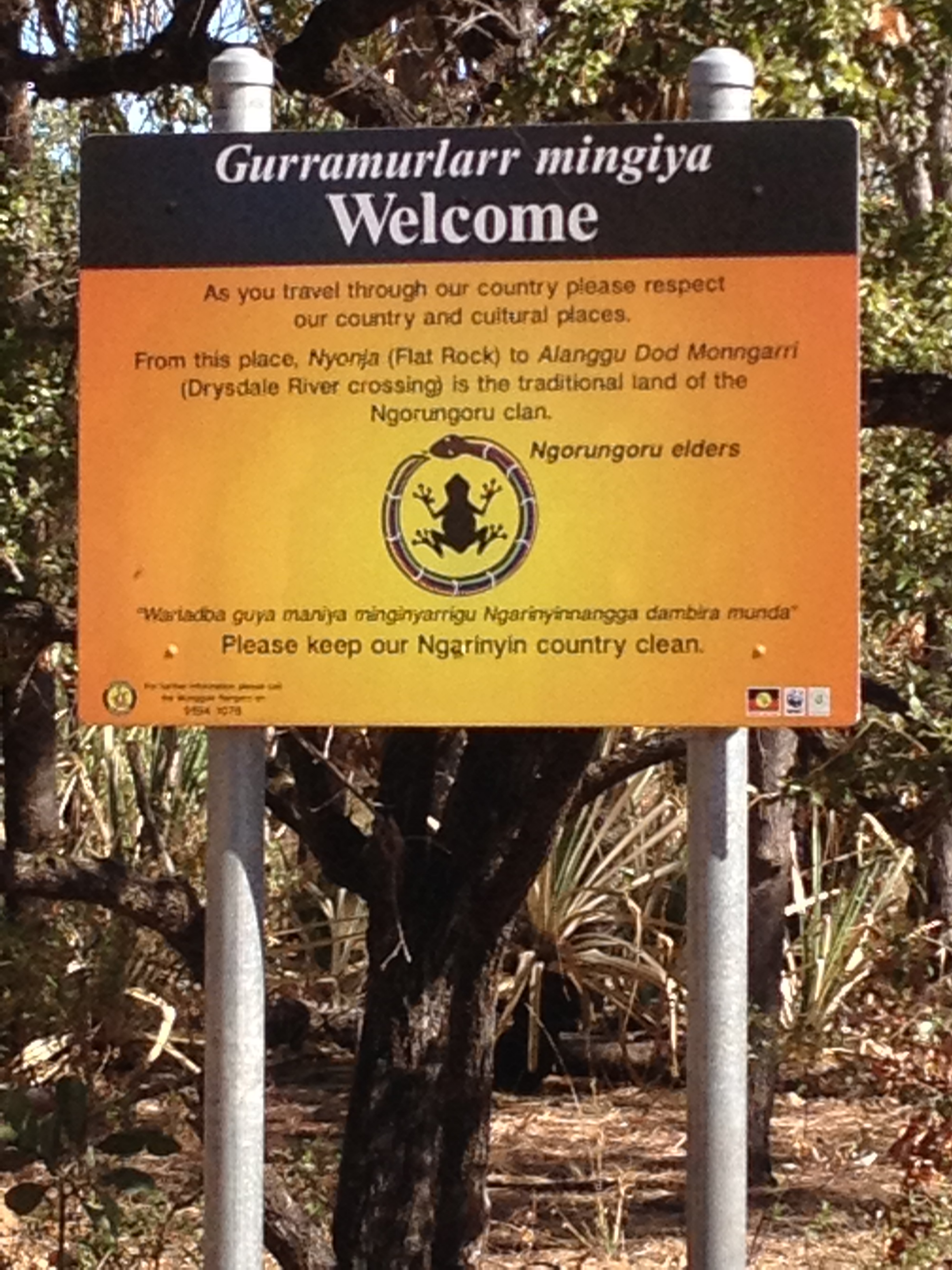
- Sign in the Ngarinjin language
- Region: Western Australia
- Ethnicity: Ngarinjin, Wurla (Waladjangarri)
- Native speakers: 59 (2021 census)
- Language family: Worrorran: Ngarinyin
- Dialects: Ngarinyin; Guwidj (Orla); Munumburru; Wolyamidi; Andadjin; Worla (Waladja); Ngarnawu; Waladjangari
- Writing system: Latin

Language codes
- ISO 639-3: Either: ung – Ngarinyin ajn – Andajin
- Glottolog: ngar1284
- AIATSIS: K18 Ngarinyin, K19 Guwidj (Orla), K25 Munumburu, K26 Wolyamidi, K23 Andajin, K43 Worla (Waladja)
- ELP: Ngarinyin
- Map showing Worrorran languages

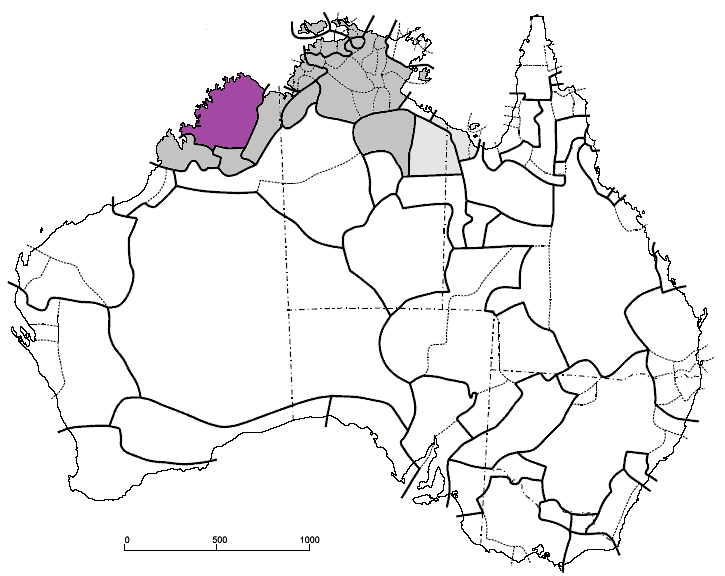
- Worrorran languages (purple), among other non-Pama-Nyungan languages (grey)

The Ngarinyin language, also known as Ungarinjin and Eastern Worrorran, is an endangered Australian Aboriginal language of the Kimberley region of Western Australia spoken by the Ngarinyin people.

== Classification and naming ==
Ngarinyin is one of the Worrorran languages, along with Wunambal and (Western) Worrowan.

It is itself a dialect cluster, and may be considered more than a single language; Robert M. W. Dixon lists Guwidj (Orla), Waladja (Worla), Ngarnawu, Andadjin, Munumburru, Wolyamidi, and Waladjangarri (Waladjangari) as dialects. Claire Bowern (2011) lists Ngarinyin, Andajin, and Worla.

According to Rumsey, Ngarinyin may be applied to either the language or the people who speak it, whereas Ungarinyin only refers to the language. McGregor reported that "Ngarinyin has been chosen as the preferred language name" by the community.

== Usage ==
With only 38 people recorded as speaking the language at home in the 2016 Australian census, Ngarinyin is considered a critically endangered and currently moribund language, though there are efforts being made to documenting speech and grammar structures before it becomes extinct, including the specifics on the terms of the kinship system of the language.

Ngarinyin is found only within the local region of Northern Kimberley, Australia, and other local languages are found in the surrounding region instead due to the small population of Ngarinyin speakers, including the Worrorran languages of Wunambal and Worrorra. Ngarinyin is found at the centre of the region, and the other Aboriginal languages in the area face similar levels of endangerment. Ngarinyin was previously one of the most prevalent of the Aboriginal languages in Northern Kimberley, but it has since become a language known only by a small number of the elderly.

Kriol is often used by younger generations instead of Ngarinyin, though some knowledge of the language is still retained by these people.

=== Kinship terms ===
Ngarinyin places great emphasis on the classification of family members and is similar to the neighbouring Aboriginal languages of Worrorra and Wunambal to the point of being virtually identical, though it is still considered unusual among those that study kinship systems of Aboriginal languages. One of the most noticeable features of this system is the use of identical terms given to kin usually separated by generation level. For instance, the titles wife's brother, wife's father and wife's father's father in English all share the same title of waiingi in Ngarinyin.

== Phonology ==
=== Vowels ===
	Front	Back
High	i iː	u uː
Mid	e	o
Low	a aː	

=== Consonants ===
	Peripheral		Laminal	Apical	
	Bilabial	Velar	Palatal	Alveolar	Retroflex
Stop	p	k	c	t	ʈ
Nasal	m	ŋ	ɲ	n	ɳ
Lateral			ʎ	l	ɭ
Rhotic				r	ɻ
Semivowel	w		j		

== Sources ==
- Capell, A. (1 January 1972). "The Languages of the Northern Kimberley, W. A.: Some Structural Principles". Oceania. 43 (1): 54–65. doi:10.1002/j.1834-4461.1972.tb01196.x. JSTOR 40330037.
- Coate, H. H. J.; Elkin, A. P. (1974). Ngarinjin-English Dictionary. Sydney: Oceania Linguistic Monographs.
- Coate, H. H. J.; Oates, Lynette (1970). A Grammar of Ngarinjin. Canberra: Australian Institute of Aboriginal Studies.
- Dixon, R. M. W. (2002). Australian Languages: Their Nature and Development. Cambridge: Cambridge University Press.
- McConvell, P., Keen, I., & Henderey, R. (2013). 7. The Evolution of Yolngu and Ngarinyin Kinship Terminologies. In, Kinship Systems: Change and Reconstruction (132). University of Utah Press.
- Rumsey, A. (1982). An intra-sentence grammar of Ungarinjin, north-western Australia. Canberra: Pacific Linguistics.
- Scheffler, H. W. (1 January 1984). "Meaning and Use in Ngarinyin Kin Classification". Oceania. 54 (4): 310–322. doi:10.1002/j.1834-4461.1984.tb02060.x. JSTOR 40330770.
