= Wunambal =

Aboriginal Australian people of the Kimberley region in Western Australia

Worrorran languages

The Wunambal (Unambal), also known as Wunambal Gaambera, Uunguu (referring to their lands), and other names, are an Aboriginal Australian people of the northern Kimberley region of Western Australia.

== People ==
The Wunambal were, according to Norman Tindale, "perhaps among the most venturesome of Australian aborigines". They learnt part of the craft of building rafts that could withstand the high rips and tides of the sea, the latter rising as much as 12 metres (39 ft), from Makassan visitors to make sailing forays out to reefs (warar) and islets in the Cassini and Montalivet archipelagoes, and as far as the northerly Long Reef. The Wunambal bands who excelled in this were the Laiau and the Wardana.

The Wunambal, Worrorra, and Ngarinyin peoples form a cultural bloc known as Wanjina Wunggurr. The shared culture is based on the dreamtime mythology and law whose creators are the Wanjina and Wunggurr spirits, ancestors of these peoples. The Wunambal Gaambera Aboriginal Corporation represents the Wunambal Gaambera people; Uunguu refers to their "home", or country.

=== Social organisation ===
The Wunambal were organised into groups:

- Laiau
- Wardana (now extinct)
- Winjai (eastern)
- Kanaria (northeastern group near Port Warrender)
- Peremanggurei

A people with an ethnonym identical to that of the Carson River Wilawila, known also as the Tjawurungari/Tawandjangango, inhabited the Osborne Islands. They spoke a dialect variety of the language spoken by the Kambure.

== Country ==
The traditional lands of the Wunambal are around York Sound. Norman Tindale estimated their tribal domains to encompass roughly 9,800 km^{2} (3,800 mi^{2}), running north from Brunswick Bay, as far as the Admiralty Gulf and the Osborne Islands. Their inland extension reached about 40 km (25 mi)–48 km (30 mi), as far as the divide of the King Edward River. They were at Cape Wellington peninsula, Port Warrender, and somewhat further east. The Worrorra lay to the south; the Ngarinjin to their west, while on their north-western frontier were the Kambure.

=== Native title ===
As part of the same native title claim lodged in 1998 by Wanjina Wunggurr RNTBC known as the Dambimangari claim, which included claims for the three peoples in the Wanjina Wunggurr cultural bloc, referred to as Dambimangari, Uunguu and Wilinggin (see above), the "Uunguu and Uunguu B" parts of the claims were determined on 23 May 2011. This gave native title to the Wunambal people over 25,909 km^{2} (10,004 sq mi), most of which was determined as exclusive possession. The Unguu land stretches along the coastal waters from the Anjo Peninsula in the north, includes the waters of Admiralty Gulf and York Sound, down to Coronation Island. Inland, it includes parts of the Mitchell River National Park and the Prince Regent National Park.

A native title claim filed on 21 October 1999 (Uunguu Part A) over an area of 44,768 km^{2} (17,285 sq mi) in the Shire of Wyndham-East Kimberley was discontinued, while a second one for the same area (Uunguu Part B) was determined on 27 November 2012, giving native title rights over part of the area claimed. In both of these the people were represented by the Kimberley Land Council.

The Wanjina Wunggurr RNTBC acts on behalf of the Ngarinyin/Wilinggin, Worrora/Dambimangari, and Wunambal Gaambera native title holders with regard to their rights and interests.

=== Boab tree carving, 1820 ===
In September 1820, on Phillip Parker King's third voyage of exploration around Australia, he ordered the crew of his ship HMS Mermaid to beach the ship for repairs sustained earlier in the voyage at a spot 600 km (370 mi) north-east of present-day Broome, now known as Careening Bay, on Coronation Island. The crew did not meet any of the local Wunambal people while they were stranded there for 18 days doing the repairs, but made observations in his journal on the other signs of life that they observed. He described not only bark shelters on the beach, but more larger and more substantial buildings on top of the hill. He also observed the remnants of sago palm nuts, which were commonly eaten along the coast.

Under orders from King, the ship's carpenter was instructed to inscribe "Mermaid 1820" on an ancient boab tree, which still stands today. The Wunambal Gaambera people administer permits for visitors to the area in which the tree is located, and the Uunguu Rangers, a team of Indigenous rangers, build and maintain facilities such as a boardwalk to help protect the environment.

== Alternative names ==
- Jamindjal, Jarmindjal (Worrorra exonym meaning "northeasterners"
- Kanaria
- Laiau (Institut islands)
- Peremanggurei (head of Prince Frederick Harbour)
- Unambal, Unambalnge
- Wanambal
- Wardana (Montlivet islands)
- Winjai
- Wonambul, Wumnabal, Wunambulu
- Wunambulu, Wunambullu

== Sources ==
- Capell, Arthur (March 1941). "Notes on the Wunambal language". Oceania. 11 (3): 295–308. doi:10.1002/j.1834-4461.1941.tb00325.x. JSTOR 40327904.
- Hernández, Theodore (March 1941a). "Social organization of the Drysdale River tribes". Oceania. 11 (3): 212–232. JSTOR 40327901.
- Hernández, Theodore (December 1941b). "Children among the Drysdale River Tribes". Oceania. 12 (2): 122–133. doi:10.1002/j.1834-4461.1941.tb00350.x. JSTOR 40327939.
- Tindale, Norman Barnett (1974). "Wundambal (WA)". Aboriginal Tribes of Australia: Their Terrain, Environmental Controls, Distribution, Limits, and Proper Names. Australian National University. ISBN 978-0-708-10741-6.
