= Mount Elizabeth Station =

Pastoral lease in Western Australia

Coordinates: 16.4185°S 126.1028°E

Location in Western Australia

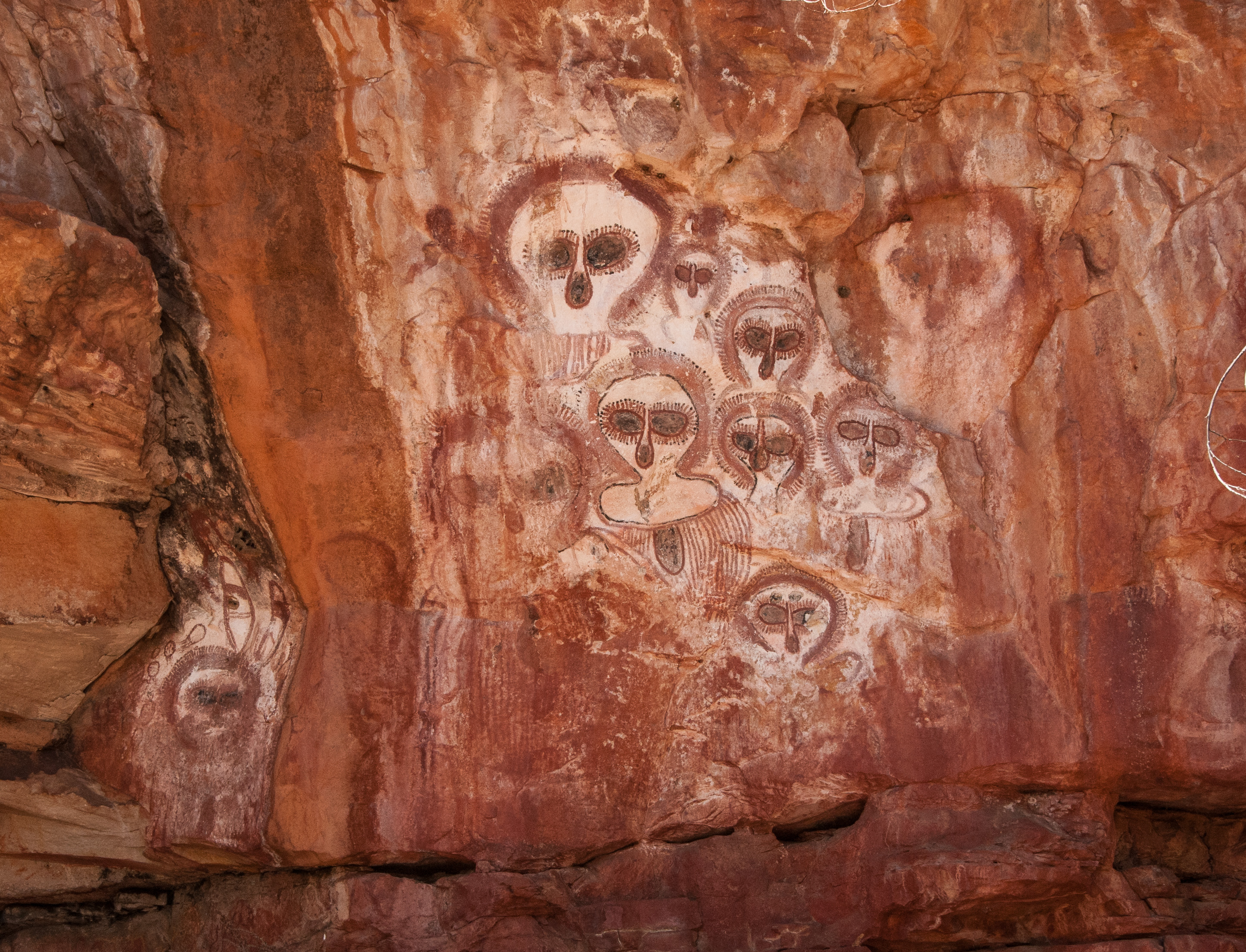
Aboriginal rock art on the Barnett River, Mount Elizabeth Station

Mount Elizabeth Station is a pastoral lease that operates as a cattle station in Western Australia.

It is situated about 205 kilometres (127 mi) north of Fitzroy Crossing and approximately 340 kilometres (211 mi) east of Derby just off the Gibb River Road in the Kimberley region.

The abundant water supply and multiple food sources of the area enabled Aboriginal peoples to develop a rich cultural life in the area. Examples of both the Gwion Gwion rock paintings and Wandjina artwork can be found on rock outcrops at the station.

Gold prospector and explorer Frank Hann visited the area in 1898 and named Mount Elizabeth after his mother.

Pioneer Frank Lacy drove a herd of cattle across the Kimberley and established the station in 1945. Both Lacy and his wife, Theresa, are buried near the homestead.

The Lacy family has held the lease since 1945 and started offering accommodation to tourists in addition to rearing cattle in the 2000s.

As of 2014 the 1,791-square-kilometre (692 sq mi) property was still on the market along with at least 15 others in the Kimberley and Northern Territory. The property is stocked with approximately 6,000 head of cattle.

== Climate ==
Mount Elizabeth as a tropical savannah climate (Aw). Winters (dry season) are short and dry with very warm days and cool nights due to the high elevation. Summers are very hot and rainy with oppressive humidity leading up to the wet season.

Climate data for Mount Elizabeth Station, Western Australia (1993–2022)
Month	Jan	Feb	Mar	Apr	May	Jun	Jul	Aug	Sep	Oct	Nov	Dec	Year
Record high °C (°F)	40.0 (104.0)	39.8 (103.6)	37.6 (99.7)	37.4 (99.3)	36.0 (96.8)	33.5 (92.3)	33.6 (92.5)	38.5 (101.3)	38.6 (101.5)	41.5 (106.7)	41.5 (106.7)	42.1 (107.8)	42.1 (107.8)
Mean daily maximum °C (°F)	32.8 (91.0)	32.5 (90.5)	32.9 (91.2)	32.8 (91.0)	30.3 (86.5)	28.4 (83.1)	28.6 (83.5)	30.7 (87.3)	34.3 (93.7)	36.2 (97.2)	36.3 (97.3)	34.5 (94.1)	32.5 (90.5)
Mean daily minimum °C (°F)	22.2 (72.0)	21.9 (71.4)	20.6 (69.1)	16.9 (62.4)	12.3 (54.1)	9.1 (48.4)	8.2 (46.8)	9.4 (48.9)	14.5 (58.1)	19.5 (67.1)	21.7 (71.1)	22.5 (72.5)	16.6 (61.9)
Record low °C (°F)	15.7 (60.3)	15.5 (59.9)	12.2 (54.0)	6.9 (44.4)	−0.9 (30.4)	−1.3 (29.7)	−0.2 (31.6)	0.0 (32.0)	2.8 (37.0)	9.0 (48.2)	13.8 (56.8)	12.0 (53.6)	−1.3 (29.7)
Average precipitation mm (inches)	256.4 (10.09)	226.2 (8.91)	165.8 (6.53)	39.0 (1.54)	15.7 (0.62)	10.9 (0.43)	3.1 (0.12)	1.9 (0.07)	7.5 (0.30)	32.2 (1.27)	79.8 (3.14)	172.3 (6.78)	1,023.2 (40.28)
Average rainy days	17.2	15.1	11.4	3.5	1.7	0.8	0.4	0.3	1.0	4.0	8.6	12.8	76.8

== See also ==
- List of ranches and stations
- List of pastoral leases in Western Australia
