= Worrorran languages =

Family of Aboriginal Australian languages of northern Western Australia

Worrorran
- Geographic distribution: Northern Kimberley region, west of Wyndham
- Linguistic classification: One of the world's primary language families
- Subdivisions: Wunambal (Northern); Ungarinyin (Eastern); Worrorra (Western)

Language codes
- Glottolog: worr1236
- Map of the Worrorran languages

The Worrorran (Wororan) languages are a small family of Australian Aboriginal languages spoken in northern Western Australia.

The Worrorran languages fall into three dialect clusters:

- Worrorran
  - the Northern Worrorran group, known as Wunambal and related dialects
  - the Eastern Worrorran group, known as Ngarinyin, a.k.a. Ungarinyin, and related dialects
  - the Western Worrorran group, known as Worrorra, and related dialects

In addition, Gulunggulu is unattested but presumably a Worrorran lect.

== Validity ==
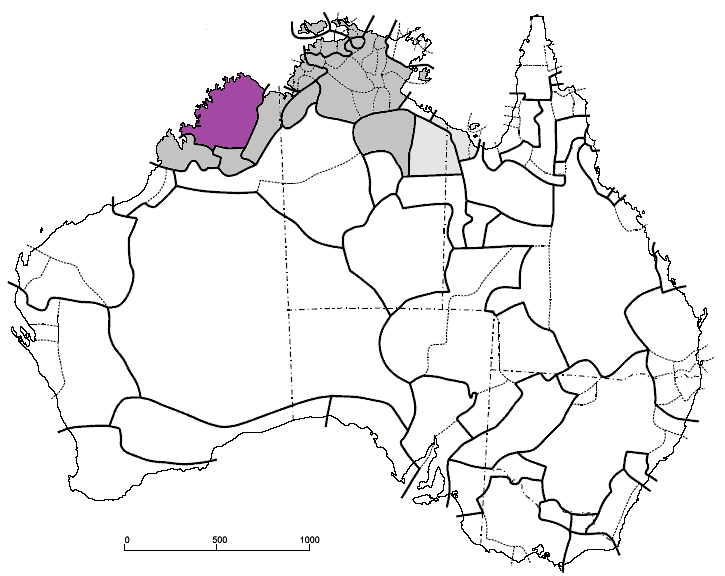
Worrorran languages (purple), among other non-Pama-Nyungan languages (grey)

There has been debate over whether the Worrorran languages are demonstrably related to one another, or constitute a geographical language group.

Dixon (2002) considers them to be language isolates with no demonstrable relationship other than that of a Sprachbund.

However, more recent literature differs from Dixon:

- Rumsey and McGregor (2009) demonstrate the cohesiveness of the family and its reconstructibility, and;
- Bowern (2011) accepts the Worroorran languages as a family.

== Vocabulary ==
Capell (1940) lists the following basic vocabulary items for the Worrorran languages:

English	Ungarinyin	Munumburu	Woljamidi	Unggumi	Worora	Wunambal (1)	Wunambal (2)	Gambre	Bargu	Gwiːni
man	aɽi, aɽu	aɽi	aɽi	aɖi	idja	ɛndjin	ɛndjin	bɛndjin	bɛndjin	bɛndjin
woman	wɔŋai, wulun	wɔŋai	wulun	wɔŋaiinja	wɔŋaiinja	wɔŋai	wɔŋai	ŋaːli	ŋaːli	ŋaːli
head	-alaŋgun	-alaŋgun	buŋguru	-bama	(ar)bri	waːra	baːndi	baːndi	baːndi	baːndi
eye	-ambul	aiambul	ambul	jumbul	ombula	wumbul	wumbul	wumbul	wumbul	wumbul
nose	-aiil	njindjuru	njindjuru	jininde	(ad)biŋu	windji	windji	windji	windji	windji
mouth	mindjäl	mindjäl	mɔga	mindjäl	(ar)djamundu	mindjäl	mindjäl	mindjäl	mɔga	mɔga
tongue	anbula	mɔga	almbɽa	wanbulema	anbula	anbulɛ	anbulɛ	mindjäl	mɔga	mɔga
stomach	ŋujen, mandu	ŋuje	mandu	duduŋga	(ar)gulum	mɛːwur, mandu	mɛːwur	mala, ŋuju	mala	mala
bone	aːnɔr	awur	ɔːnɔr	janaurge	inari	bunar	bunar	awur	bunar	bunar
blood	guli	guli	wundäbun	guliːnga	gulu	ŋanda	guli	guli	guli	guli
kangaroo	iali	iali	iali	ware	aːrura	amba	amba	amba	amba	amba
opossum	andäri, garimba	andäri	guman	gundumanja	burgumba	gaiɛmba, ganari	burgumba, garimba	wuraba, guman	wudɔɖa	guman
emu	djebara	djebara	djebara	djebarinja	djebarinja	jiluluŋari	wiɛri	wiɛri	wiɛri	wiɛri
crow	wa̱ŋgara	wa̱ŋgara	maɖiwa	wa̱ŋgaranja	wa̱ŋgaranja	waːwanja		waŋguɽa	waŋguɽa	waŋguɽa
fly	ŋanauɛra	wurŋun	wurŋun	wurŋare	ŋanauara	ŋanauara	gaualjɛra	ŋaːwan	gaŋgu	worŋa
sun	maɽaŋi	meɽiŋun	maːri	wandinja	maraŋanja	maɽaŋo	maɽaŋi	maɽaŋo	mɔɽɔŋ	mɔɽɔŋ
moon	gunjili, gaɳgi	gaɳgi	gaːgiri	ginjila	gunjila	goɽa, gaɳgi	gunjili	girŋal	wamara	gagari
fire	windjäŋun	windjäŋu	wurgala	wianga	wianu	windjäŋum	buː	windjäŋun	buː	wunar
smoke	bindjän	ŋundjur	ŋundjur	bindjäŋga	bidjugu	bindjän	bindjägun	ŋundjur	ŋundjur	ŋundjur
water	ŋabun	ŋawa	jaːwal	jaŋga	agu	jaːwal	jaːwal	ŋawa, jaːwal	ŋawa	ŋawa
