= Collier Bay, Western Australia =

Bay in Western Australia

Coordinates: 16°11′6″S 124°15′51″E

Map of Collier Bay

Collier Bay is a bay in the Indian Ocean, located on the Kimberley coast in the north-west of Western Australia.

The bay is about 100 kilometres (62 mi) deep (east to west) and 65 kilometres (40 mi) wide (north to south). It is bounded by the Yampi Peninsula to the south, the Montgomery Reef and Koolan Island at its western extent, with Camden Sound Marine Park beyond. The Kingfisher Islands, Traverse Island, Fletcher Island, and a number of other small islands lie within the bay. Fresh water flows into the bay via Secure Bay, as well as the Walcott Inlet, which brings water from the Charnley, Calder and Isdell Rivers into the bay via Yule Entrance.

The bay was named after Sir George Collier, Vice Admiral of the Royal Navy by Phillip Parker King in 1821.

== See also ==
- Charnley River–Artesian Range Wildlife Sanctuary
