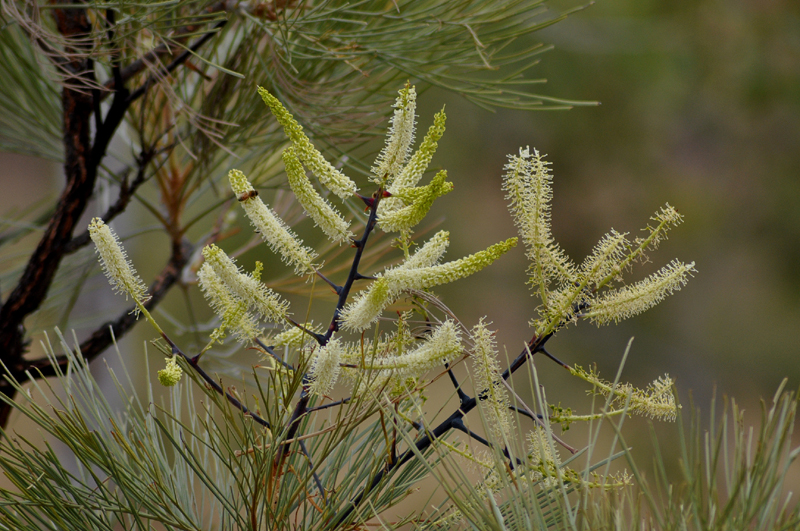
- Near Timber Creek

Conservation status
- Least Concern (IUCN 3.1)

Scientific classification
- Kingdom: Plantae
- Clade: Embryophytes
- Clade: Tracheophytes
- Clade: Spermatophytes
- Clade: Angiosperms
- Clade: Eudicots
- Order: Proteales
- Family: Proteaceae
- Genus: Grevillea
- Species: G. erythroclada

Binomial name
- Grevillea erythroclada W.Fitzg.

= Grevillea erythroclada =

Species of shrub endemic to Western Australia

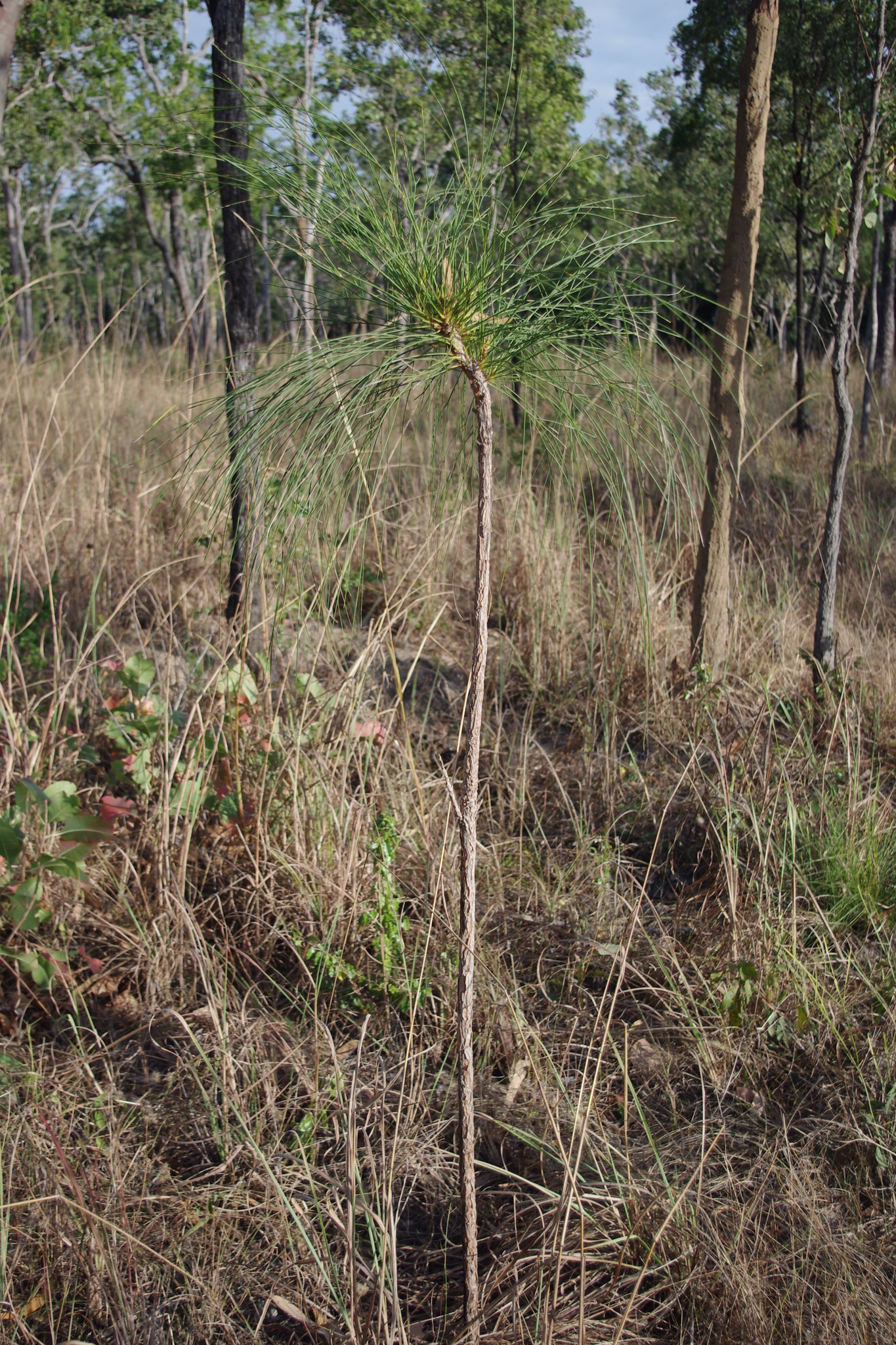
Habit near Mapoon

Grevillea erythroclada, commonly called needle-leaf grevillea, is a species of flowering plant in the family Proteaceae and is endemic to northern Australia. It is a shrub or small tree with divided leaves, the ultimate lobes linear to more or less cylindrical, and clusters of cream-coloured to pale yellow flowers.

== Description ==
Grevillea erythroclada is a shrub or tree that typically grows to a height of 2.5–8 m (8 ft 2 in – 26 ft 3 in). It has divided leaves 250–520 mm (9.8–20.5 in) long with five to thirteen primary lobes, sometimes the lobes further divided. The ultimate lobes are linear to more or less cylindrical, 100–360 mm (3.9–14.2 in) long and 0.5–1.8 mm (0.020–0.071 in) wide. The leaves are more or less glabrous and deeply wrinkled. The flowers are arranged in clusters with up to eight branches, each branch cylindrical and 60–180 mm (2.4–7.1 in) long. The flowers are cream-coloured to pale yellow, the pistil 6.5–9 mm (0.26–0.35 in) long. Flowering occurs from September to October and the fruit is a flattened elliptic follicle 19–29 mm (0.75–1.14 in) long.

== Taxonomy ==
Grevillea erythroclada was first formally described in 1918 by William Vincent Fitzgerald in Journal and Proceedings of the Royal Society of Western Australia from specimens he collected near the Upper Isdell and Hann Rivers. The specific epithet (erythroclada) means "a red young shoot".

== Distribution and habitat ==
Needle-leaf grevillea grows in open woodland, often near watercourses, in scattered locations in the Central Kimberley, Great Sandy Desert, Northern Kimberley and Victoria Bonaparte bioregions of northern Western Australia, in the north of the Northern Territory, and on Cape York Peninsula in Queensland.

== Conservation status ==
Grevillea erythroclada is listed as least concern on the IUCN Red List of Threatened Species, as well as under the Territory Parks and Wildlife Conservation Act and the Queensland Government Nature Conservation Act 1992. This species is widely distributed, common and its population is assumed to be stable. There are no known major threats to this species, either current or in the near future.

It is also listed as not threatened by the Western Australian Department of Biodiversity, Conservation and Attractions.

== See also ==
- List of Grevillea species
