= Mount Hart Station =

Former pastoral lease in Western Australia

Coordinates: 16.823°S 124.913°E

Location in Western Australia

Mount Hart Station, commonly referred to as Mount Hart, is a defunct pastoral lease that once operated as a cattle station in Western Australia. The lands are part of a conservation area and the homestead operates as a wilderness lodge for tourists.

It is situated about 146 kilometres (91 mi) east of Derby and 330 kilometres (205 mi) north west of Halls Creek, in the heart of the Wunaamin Miliwundi Ranges in the Kimberley region. The property is accessed via the Gibb River Road and the homestead is situated on the banks of the Barker River. Mount Hart shares a boundary with Charnley River Station.

The property once occupied an area of 4,047 square kilometres (1,563 sq mi).

Frank Hann was the first European to cross the Wunaamin Miliwundi Ranges, then named as King Leopold Ranges, in 1898 via an 18-kilometre (11 mi) pass.

The station was established prior to 1906 when Robert Brown was the manager. Brown was in partnership with Felix Edgar and William Chalmers, who together owned the station.

In 1906 the homestead was broken into twice, and the contents stolen. Brown made a report to the local police, who tracked the Aboriginal people responsible to their camp along the Charnley River and killed a man who tried to spear them. Another nine men were arrested and two females were detained, and all the equipment, including a double-barrelled shotgun, was recovered.

Relationships between the settlers and the traditional owners further deteriorated in 1910 when Brown sent an urgent message to Edgar that a group of 100 had taken possession of the station and the cattle had gone.

Chalmers was found fatally shot at Mount Hart in 1933. He had been ill for some time.

The station was abandoned in 1934, and the lease was next take up by "Stumpy" Fraser in 1935. The property was soon struck by drought, forcing Fraser to move the homestead closer to permanent water. In 1946, following another drought, Fraser moved the homestead again, to its present location. He abandoned the property in 1957.

The property continued to operate as a cattle station until it was declassified as a viable pastoral lease in 1987. It eventually became part of the 3,700 square kilometres (1,429 sq mi) Wunaamin Miliwundi Ranges Conservation Park when it was gazetted in 2000.

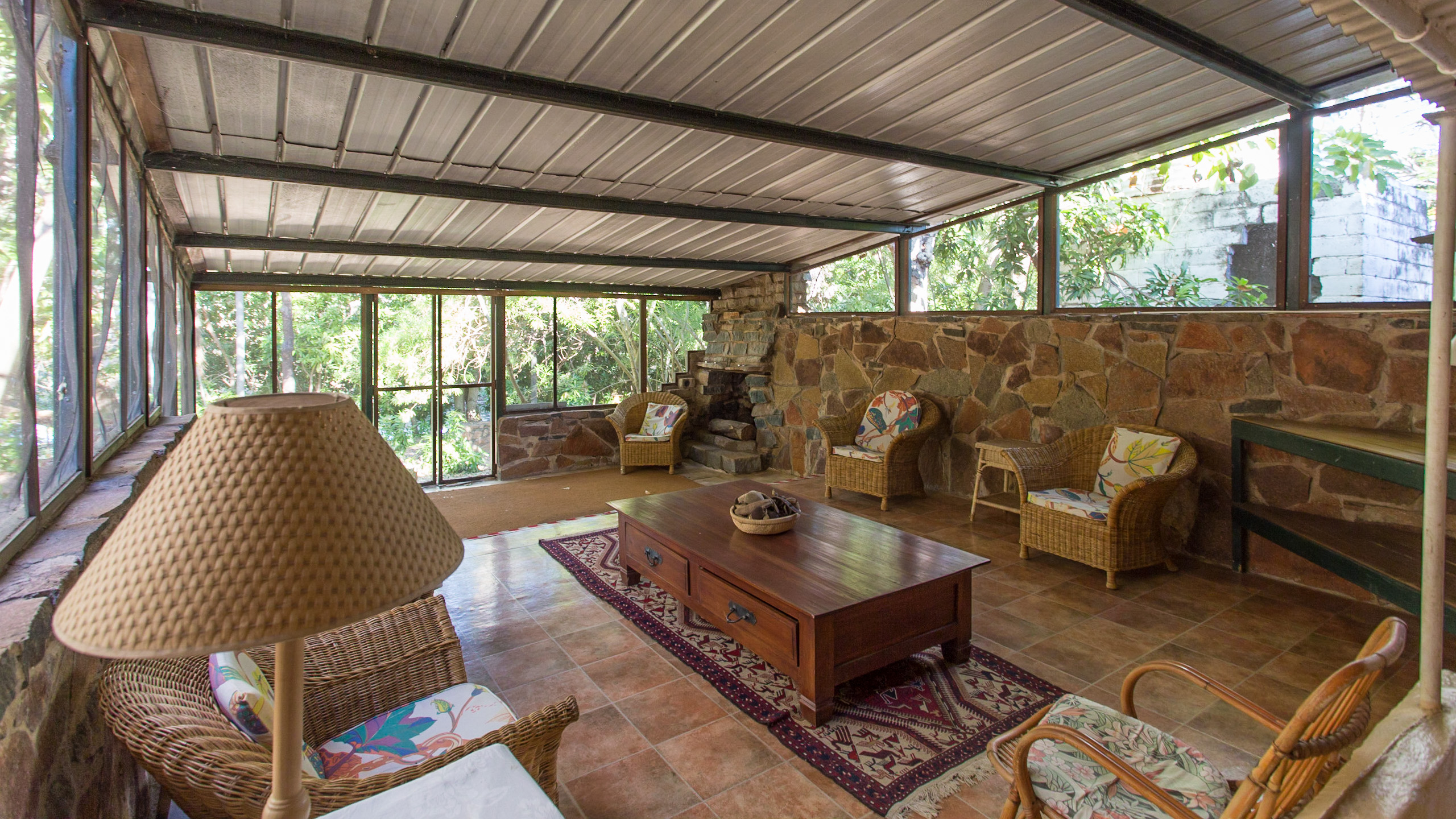
The most recent Mount Hart homestead was built in 1960 and stands on the banks of the Barker River.

Taffy Abotts managed the property from 1991 to 2011 during which time he renovated the homestead and built various other buildings. He estimated the value of the improvements as being A$1.9 million. The Department of Environment and Conservation asked Abotts to leave the property, offering A$200,000 for him to do so. Abotts was later paid an undisclosed amount and left voluntarily.

The APT company Kimberley Wilderness Adventures was selected by the state government to operate the wilderness lodge in late 2011. The planning and preparation of the site was part of the Royalties for Regions scheme.

== See also ==
- List of ranches and stations
