= Frederick Maurice House =

English scientist and explorer (1865–1936)

Frederick Maurice House (1865–1936) was a naturalist, explorer, medical officer and sheep farmer of Western Australia.

Born in England, at Alverstoke, he completed his medical training and arrived in Western Australia in 1891. House joined the government expedition of 1901, led by Frederick S.Drake-Brockman, that journeyed to the far Northwest of the state. On this expedition he collected a single specimen of a bird, his name was commemorated in the description, Amytornis housei (House's Amytis bird), published by Alexander William Milligan. The explorer Frank Hann gave the doctor's name to the geographic feature Mt House, and it appears in the epithet of Eucalyptus houseana Maiden published by William Fitzgerald. While on this expedition he made other collections of flora and fauna specimens and took photographs of indigenous cave paintings.

House resided at Gnowangerup, where he turned his attention to the breeding of merino sheep after retiring from his duties.
