= Jacksonia rupestris =

Scientific classification
- Kingdom: Plantae
- Clade: Tracheophytes
- Clade: Angiosperms
- Clade: Eudicots
- Clade: Rosids
- Order: Fabales
- Family: Fabaceae
- Subfamily: Faboideae
- Genus: Jacksonia
- Species: J. rupestris

Binomial name
- Jacksonia rupestris Chappill

Species of legume

Jacksonia rupestris is a species of flowering plant in the family Fabaceae and is endemic to the north of Western Australia. It is a dense, sprawling, spindly shrub with greyish-green branches, the leaves reduced to reddish-brown, egg-shaped scales, bright yellow flowers with red-brown on the outside, and borne on short side-branches, and membranous, narrowly elliptic pods.

== Description ==
Jacksonia rupestris is a dense, sprawling, spindly shrub that typically grows up to 10–30 cm (3.9–11.8 in) high and 1.0–1.5 m (3 ft 3 in – 4 ft 11 in) wide. It has greyish-green branches, its leaves reduced to egg-shaped, reddish-brown scales, 0.9–2.3 mm (0.035–0.091 in) long and 0.6–1.2 mm (0.024–0.047 in) wide. The flowers are borne on short side-branches on a pedicel 1.0–2.4 mm (0.039–0.094 in) long, with broadly egg-shaped bracteoles 1.2–2.1 mm (0.047–0.083 in) long and 0.6–0.7 mm (0.024–0.028 in) wide. The floral tube is 0.7–1.2 mm (0.028–0.047 in) long and the sepals are membranous, with lobes 5.3–7.2 mm (0.21–0.28 in) long, 0.9–1.8 mm (0.035–0.071 in) wide and fused for 0.2–0.6 mm (0.0079–0.0236 in). The petals are bright yellow with reddish-brown veins on the outside, the standard petal 4.0–5.8 mm (0.16–0.23 in) long and 5.0–6.6 mm (0.20–0.26 in) deep, the wings 4.0–4.6 mm (0.16–0.18 in) long, and the keel 4.5–5.0 mm (0.18–0.20 in) long. The stamens have greenish-yellow filaments, 1.6–5.2 mm (0.063–0.205 in) long. Flowering occurs from May to August, and the fruit is a membranous, densely hairy, narrowly elliptic pod 9.3–11 mm (0.37–0.43 in) long and 4.5–5.0 mm (0.18–0.20 in) wide.

== Taxonomy ==
Jacksonia rupestris was first formally described in 2007 by Jennifer Anne Chappill in Australian Systematic Botany from specimens collected on a sandstone escarpment, south of the track to Walcott Inlet in 1992. The specific epithet (rupestris) means 'rocky'.

== Distribution and habitat ==
This species of Jacksonia grows in woodland on sand in rocky ground near the Calder and Prince Regent Rivers, in the Northern Kimberley bioregion of northern Western Australia.

== Conservation status ==
Jacksonia rupestris is listed as "not threatened" by the Western Australian Government Department of Biodiversity, Conservation and Attractions.
