= Acacia tenuispica =

Scientific classification
- Kingdom: Plantae
- Clade: Tracheophytes
- Clade: Angiosperms
- Clade: Eudicots
- Clade: Rosids
- Order: Fabales
- Family: Fabaceae
- Subfamily: Caesalpinioideae
- Clade: Mimosoid clade
- Genus: Acacia
- Species: A. tenuispica

Binomial name
- Acacia tenuispica Maslin
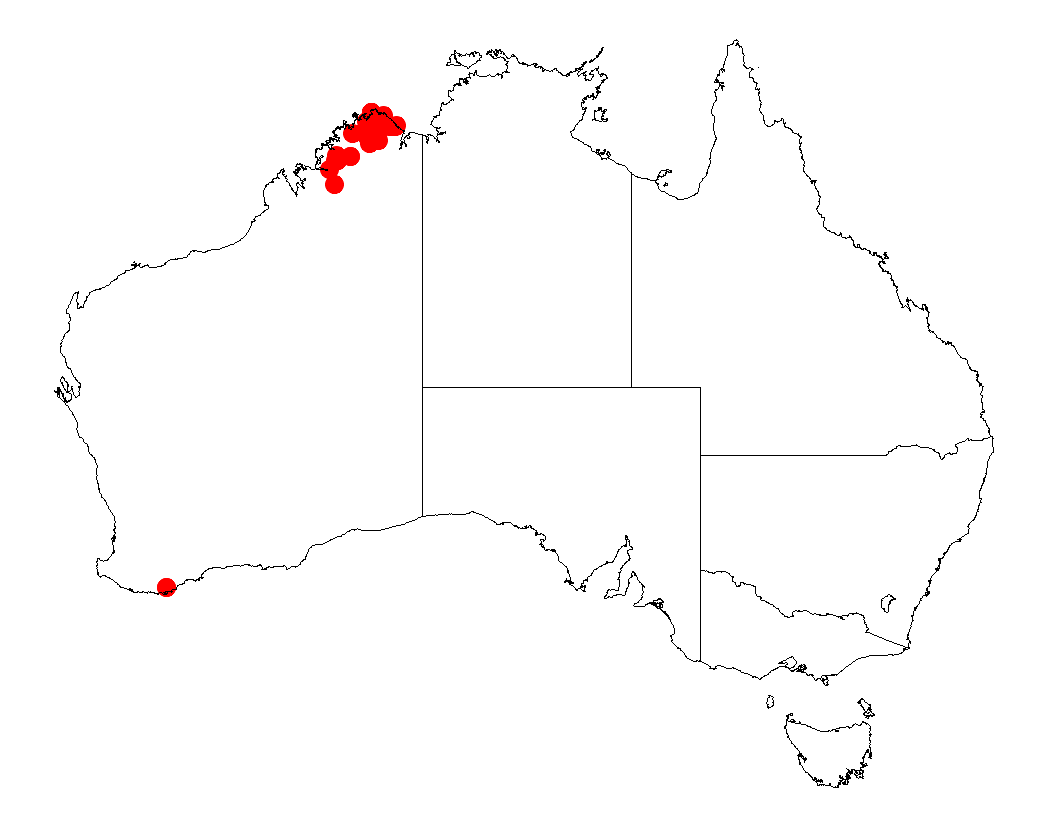
- Occurrence data from AVH

Species of legume

Acacia tenuispica is a tree or shrub belonging to the genus Acacia and the subgenus Juliflorae that is endemic to north western Australia.

== Description ==
The open branched spreading tree or shrub typically grows to a height of 1.5 to 5 metres (5 to 16 ft) with an open;y branched, obconic habit. It has glabrous and prominently ribbed branchlets that have small rounded protuberances Band are angled towards the apices. Like most species of Acacia it has phyllodes rather than true leaves. The thin phyllodes sometimes have small rounded projections on their surfaces and have an asymmetrical narrowly elliptic shape. The phyllodes usually have a length of 4 to 7 cm (1.6 to 2.8 in) and a width of 6 to 16 mm (0.24 to 0.63 in) and have many evenly spaced nerves with three or five often being a little more pronounced than the others. It blooms from May to July producing yellow flowers. The simple inflorescences are found in pairs in the axils with narrow and cylindrical flower-spikes that are 1.5 to 4.5 cm (0.59 to 1.77 in) in length and packed with golden coloured flowers. The woody red seed pods that form after flowering have a narrowly oblong shape that narrows toward the base. The pods are up to 7.5 cm (3.0 in) in length and have a width of 6 to 8 mm (0.24 to 0.31 in) with fine oblique nerves and narrowly winged margins and obliquely arranged seeds inside. The shiny brown seeds are around 4 to 4.5 mm (0.16 to 0.18 in) in length with an elliptic shape and an aril shape like an inverted cone.

== Distribution ==
It is native to an area in the Kimberley region of Western Australia where it is found in the catchment are of the Prince Regent River and east of Walcott Inlet and also in the catchment area of the Drysdale River where it is situated in a variety of habitat mostly around sandstone as a part of Eucalyptus woodland communities.

== See also ==
- List of Acacia species
