= Charnley River–Artesian Range Wildlife Sanctuary =

Protected area in Western Australia

- IUCN category VI (protected area with sustainable use of natural resources)
- Location within Western Australia
- Coordinates: 16°29′S 125°12′E
- Area: 300,060 ha (1,158.5 sq mi)
- Designation: private nature reserve
- Operator: Australian Wildlife Conservancy

Charnley River–Artesian Range Wildlife Sanctuary is a protected area covering about 3,000 square kilometres (1,200 sq mi) in the Kimberley region of Western Australia. It is situated about 205 kilometres (127 mi) east of Derby and 287 kilometres (178 mi) north west of Halls Creek, and is accessed via the Gibb River Road. It is named after the Charnley River that flows through the property.

It is operated as a sanctuary by the Australian Wildlife Conservancy (AWC), a public charity. The sanctuary occupies the former Charnley River Station, a pastoral lease that operated as a cattle station and was formerly known as the Beverley Springs Station, along with land owned by the Department of Biodiversity, Conservation and Attractions and managed jointly with the AWC. The AWC leases part of the land to Australian Capital Equity (ACE) after selling the cattle to them, and ACE now operates a cattle station on part of the land, excluding key areas such as rivers.

The AWC operates a wilderness camp and interpretation centre in the sanctuary, and visitors can hike and swim in the sanctuary's gorges.

== History of the station ==
Formerly known as the Beverley Springs Station, and covering an area of 3,000 square kilometres (1,158 sq mi), the property was acquired in 1969 by the Nixon family in a run-down state. It was the first property along the Gibb River road to offer accommodation to tourists. Marion Nixon wrote Children in the Sun, a book about raising her five children on the station, and later wrote Stop whispering Annie.

The Barrett family acquired the property in 1981. The two sons, Matt and Russell, discovered an unknown species of pitcher plant on the property, going on to be botanists specialising in the Kimberley region. They rediscovered a species of Auranticarpa collected during the expedition of Philip Parker King in 1821 and later thought to be extinct.

In 2010 the property was bought by Peter and Cheryl Camp, who renamed it the Charnley River Station, ran a herd of approximately 3,000 cattle, and built up its tourism potential. The property was sold again in February 2011, to Australian Wildlife Conservancy.

== Description ==
The sanctuary covers about 3,000 square kilometres (1,200 sq mi) of land. The AWC leases part of the land, the 300,000 hectares (740,000 acres) of the Charnley River Pastoral Station, to Australian Capital Equity, which operates a cattle station with Brahman cattle bought from the AWC. The cattle are not allowed to roam freely over important ecological areas such as the river systems, and the AWC works on controlling feral animals and weeds throughout the sanctuary. The WA Department of Biodiversity, Conservation and Attractions owns the other 37,000 hectares (91,000 acres), managed by the Department of Parks and Wildlife in partnership with AWC.

The AWC undertakes research on methods of fire control, control of feral animals (which include pigs, donkeys, cattle and brumbies), especially in the lower-lying savannah areas in the southern and eastern parts of the sanctuary, and on the effect of the various threats on specific wildlife species.

Access to the Charnley River Station, which caters for campers, although no longer provides accommodation or meals, is via the Gibb River Road. The station is 43 kilometres (27 mi) away from the turnoff. There are three gorges with freshwater pools (Paradise Pool, Dillie Gorge and Donkey Hole) within the old cattle station property, two of which are fed by springs. The property has its own airstrip.

== Species ==
The sanctuary is home to 11 threatened species of animals, and a further 29 that include species either endemic or with only isolated populations in the Kimberley. Mammals include the Wyulda (scaly-tailed possum), the tiny rock-wallaby known as monjon, and the Kimberley rock rat. Endemic birds on the property include the black grasswren and Kimberley honeyeater, and there are a number of endemic reptile species, such as the rough-scaled python, Kimberley crevice skink, and a number of gecko species. There are species which are now extinct in large areas where they were previously present, including the golden-backed tree-rat and the golden bandicoot.

== Adjoining properties ==
On the south-west the Sanctuary shares a boundary with Wunaamin Miliwundi Ranges Conservation Park, which was formerly Mount Hart Station. Mount House Station is to the south-east.

=== Wilinggin and Munja ===
Charnley River is bounded on the north and east by Wilinggin Indigenous Protected Area. The (historic) Munja Aboriginal Cattle Station, also known as the Munja Aboriginal reserve, lay or lies just to the east of the Walcott Inlet, within the Artesian Range, either within the Wilinggin IPA or within the Charnley River sanctuary. Around 700 Aboriginal people were based around this location in 1927, which was initially government-run before being transferred to the Presbyterian Church in 1940, although negotiations were not completed until 1949 owing to World War II. It was also known as Avon Valley Cattle Station.

== See also ==
- List of ranches and stations
