= Acacia sericata =

Scientific classification
- Kingdom: Plantae
- Clade: Tracheophytes
- Clade: Angiosperms
- Clade: Eudicots
- Clade: Rosids
- Order: Fabales
- Family: Fabaceae
- Subfamily: Caesalpinioideae
- Clade: Mimosoid clade
- Genus: Acacia
- Species: A. sericata

Binomial name
- Acacia sericata A.Cunn. ex. Benth.
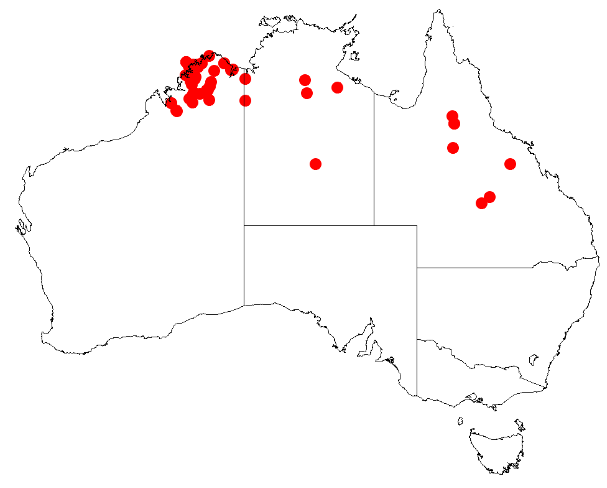
- Occurrence data from AVH

Species of legume

Acacia sericata is a shrub or tree of the genus Acacia and the subgenus Plurinerves that is endemic across northern Australia.

== Description ==
The dense shrub or tree typically grows to a height of 2.5 to 7 metres (8 to 23 ft) but can reach up to 10 m (33 ft) and has rough and fissured bark and has hairy branchlets. Like most species of Acacia it has phyllodes rather than true leaves. The thinly leathery evergreen phyllodes have an inequilaterally ovate or elliptic sickle shape with a length of 8 to 15 cm (3.1 to 5.9 in) and a width of 2 to 6 cm (0.79 to 2.36 in) and have three to four distant main nerves. The inflorescences have spherical flower-heads with a diameter of about 5 mm (0.20 in) and contain 30 white coloured flowers. The flat, glabrous and woody seed pods that form after flowering are up to 14 cm (5.5 in) in length and 2.2 to 3.5 cm (0.87 to 1.38 in) wide and have narrow wings. The dull brown seeds inside have a black periphery and length of 9 to 10 mm (0.35 to 0.39 in) with a large aril.

== Taxonomy ==
The species was first formally described by the botanist Allan Cunningham in 1842 as part of George Bentham and William Jackson Hooker's work Notes on Mimoseae, with a synopsis of species published in the London Journal of Botany. It was reclassified as Racosperma sericatum by Leslie Pedley in 2003 then transferred back to genus Acacia in 2006.

== Distribution ==
It is native to an area in the Kimberley region of Western Australia where it is commonly situated on plateaux and on rocky slopes composed of quartzite, sandstone or laterite. The range extends from the Isdell River in the west to the Drysdale River area in the north east where it is also found along sandy river banks as a part of in open woodland, open forest and shrubland communities.

== See also ==
- List of Acacia species
