= Uzucha humeralis =

Scientific classification
- Kingdom: Animalia
- Phylum: Arthropoda
- Class: Insecta
- Order: Lepidoptera
- Family: Xyloryctidae
- Genus: Uzucha
- Species: U. humeralis

Binomial name
- Uzucha humeralis Walker, 1864

Species of moth

Uzucha humeralis is a moth in the family Xyloryctidae. It was described by Francis Walker in 1864. It is found in Australia, where it has been recorded from New South Wales and Queensland.

The wingspan is 42–61 mm. The forewings are fuscous, slightly purplish tinged, sometimes reddish tinged in the disc. The extreme costal edge is pale reddish ochreous with a semicircular dark reddish-fuscous spot on the base of the costa, margined posteriorly with pale reddish ochreous. The base of the inner margin is pale ochreous and there is a very small deep ferruginous or reddish-fuscous spot in the disc at two-thirds. The hindwings are rather dark fuscous, the apical two-fifths pale ochreous yellowish, the division suffused.

The larvae feed on Eucalyptus maculata, Eucalyptus platyphylla and Angophora species from within a silken gallery covered by conspicuous brown web in the bark.
