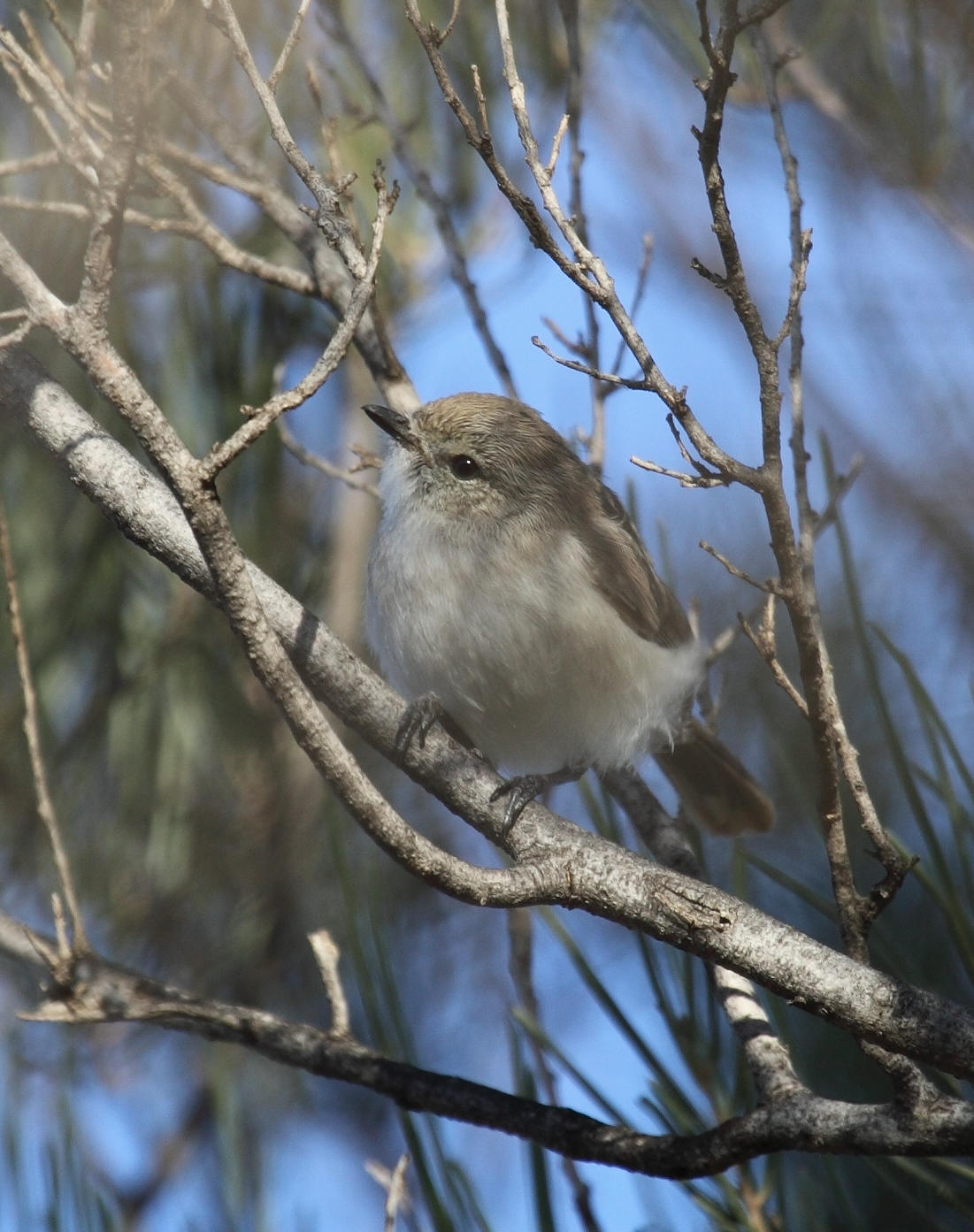

Conservation status
- Least Concern (IUCN 3.1)

Scientific classification
- Kingdom: Animalia
- Phylum: Chordata
- Class: Aves
- Order: Passeriformes
- Family: Acanthizidae
- Genus: Acanthiza
- Species: A. robustirostris

Binomial name
- Acanthiza robustirostris Milligan, 1903
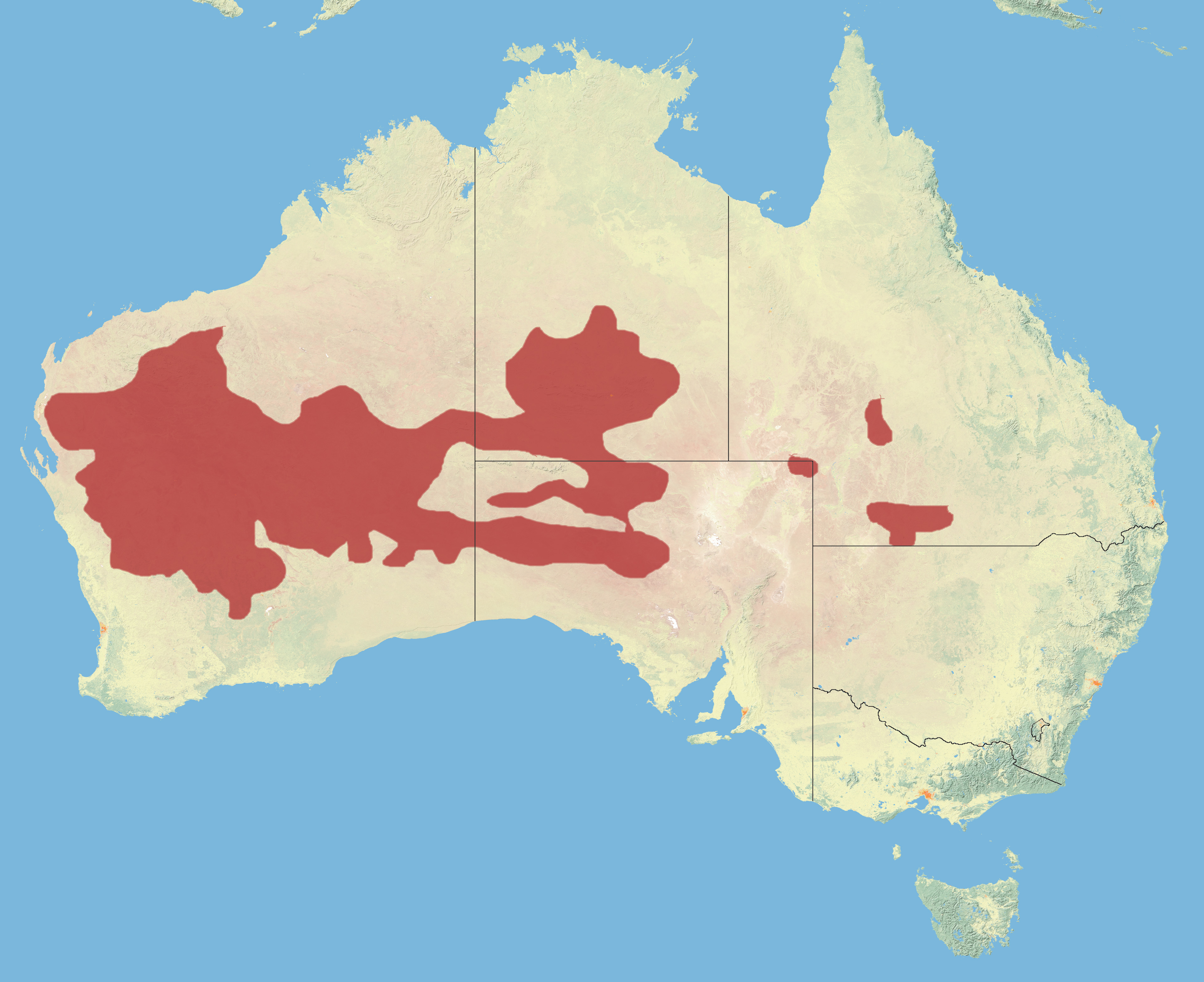
- The Approximate Distribution of the slaty-backed thornbill

= Slaty-backed thornbill =

Species of bird

The slaty-backed thornbill (Acanthiza robustirostris) is a species of bird in the family Acanthizidae. It is endemic to Australia.
