= Uzucha borealis =

Scientific classification
- Domain: Eukaryota
- Kingdom: Animalia
- Phylum: Arthropoda
- Class: Insecta
- Order: Lepidoptera
- Family: Xyloryctidae
- Genus: Uzucha
- Species: U. borealis

Binomial name
- Uzucha borealis Turner, 1898

Species of moth

Uzucha borealis is a moth in the family Xyloryctidae. It was described by Alfred Jefferis Turner in 1898. It is found in Australia, where it has been recorded from Queensland.

The wingspan is about 47 mm. The forewings are pale ochreous brown with a dark reddish-fuscous spot on the base of the costa and a conspicuous reddish-fuscous spot in the disc at two-thirds. The hindwings are pale ochreous, with the basal third fuscous and the division suffused.

The larvae feed on Eucalyptus platyphylla from within a silken gallery covered by a conspicuous brown web in the bark.
