= Barnett River =

River in Western Australia

Coordinates: 16.7443°S 125.9311°E

Location
- Country: Australia

Physical characteristics
- Source
  - location: Caroline Range
  - elevation: 616 metres (2,021 ft)
- Mouth
  - location: confluence with Hann River
  - elevation: 377 metres (1,237 ft)
- Length: 68 km (42 mi)

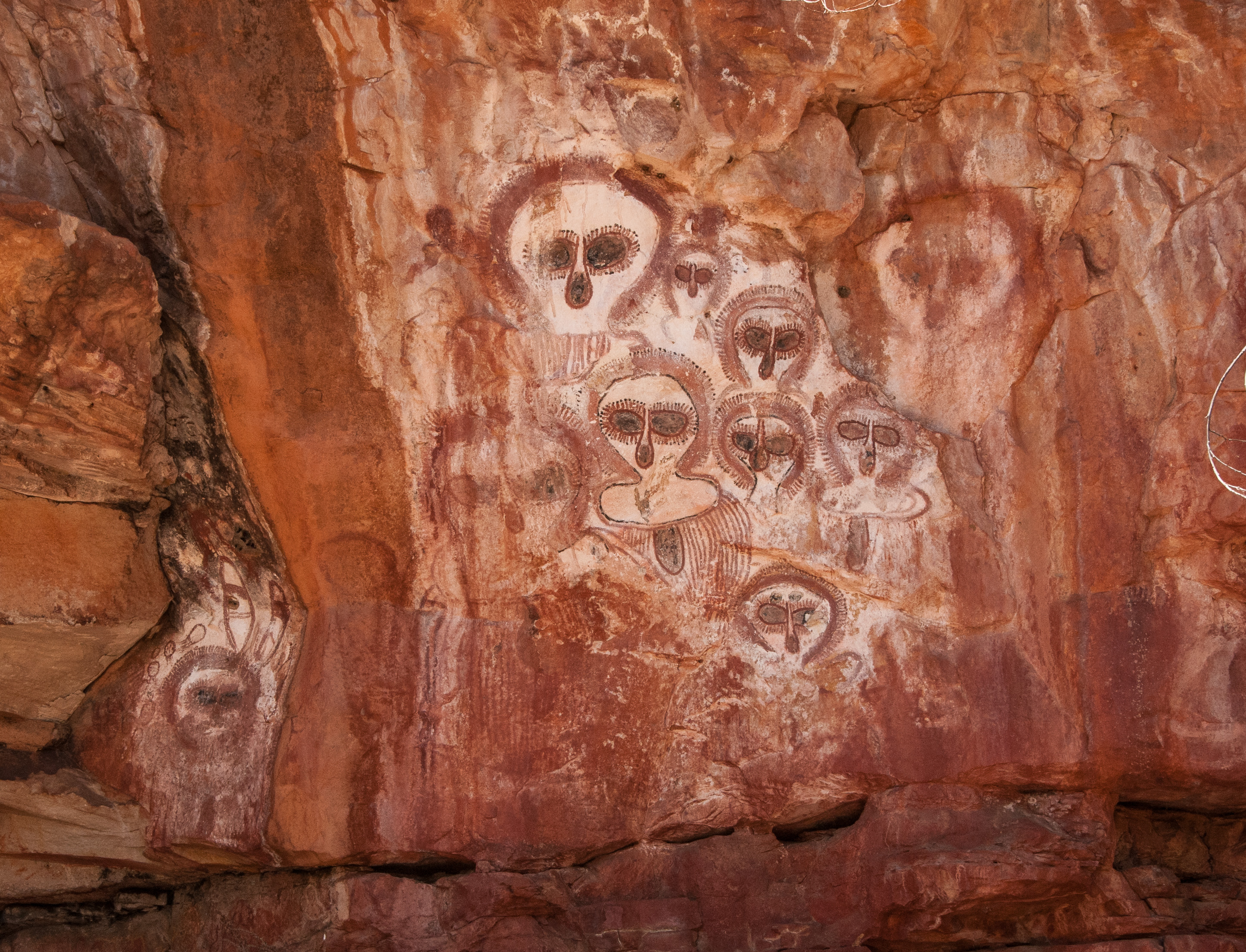
Aboriginal rock art in Wunnumurra Gorge, Barnett River

The Barnett River is a river in the Kimberley region of Western Australia.

The river rises below the Caroline Range near Mount Lacy and then flows south to the west of Mount Elizabeth then through the Barnett River gorge crossing the Gibb River Road near the Mount Barnett roadhouse before flowing into the Hann River in the Philip Range near Mount Caroline.

The traditional owners of the areas around the river are the Ola people.

It was named by the first European to explore the river, Frank Hann, who had seen it during his expedition to the region in 1898. He named the river after Alfred Barnett, who was the manager of Balmaningarra Station, which is situated along the Lennard River.

Fish such as the western rainbowfish, the false-spine catfish and the Barnett River gudgeon have all been found within the river system.
