= Maude Edith Victoria Fleay =

Australian wildlife artist (1869–1965)

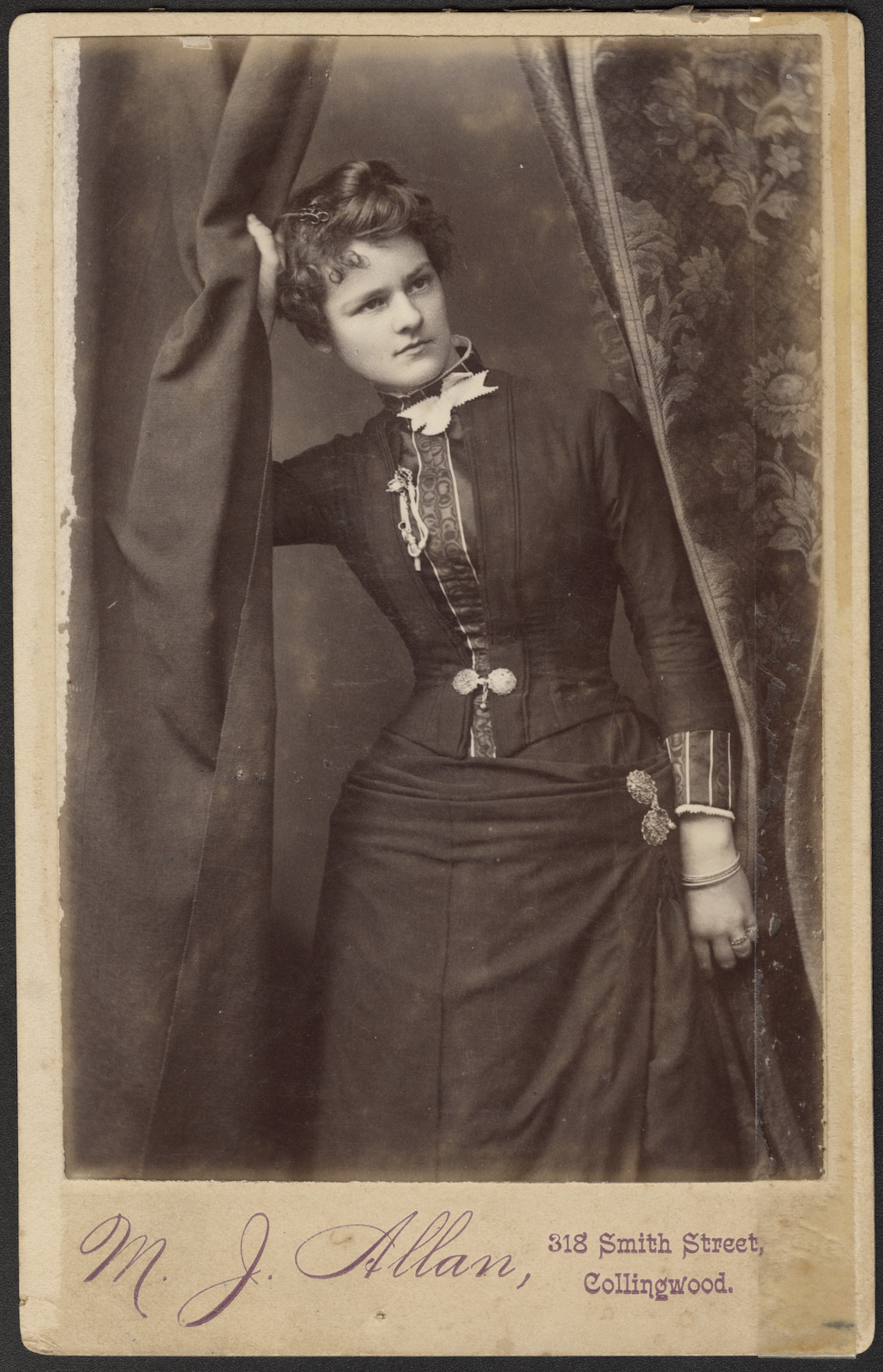
- Born: 1869; Sulky Gully, Victoria, Australia
- Died: 18 May 1965 (aged 95–96); Colac, Victoria, Australia
- Known for: Painting
- Spouse: William Henry Fleay (m. 1905)

Maude Edith Victoria Glover Fleay (1869–1965), was one of Australia's first wildlife artists. She was known for her paintings of Australian marsupials.

== Biography ==
Fleay was born in 1869 in Sulky Gully, Australia. She studied drawing at the School of Mines, Ballarat, where she was taught by David Davies. She also studied under Frederick McCubbin at the National Gallery School in Melbourne. Her aunt, Elizabeth Glover, owned "Gracedale Hotel" in Healesville. Fleay did a painting of "Gracedale", which hung in Elizabeth Glover's home in Gardenvale.

She exhibited with the Melbourne Society of Women Painters and Sculptors and she was a member of the Victorian Artists Society. In 1938 she exhibited at the Athenaeum Gallery with fellow women artists Annie Gates and Henrietta Maria Gulliver. Glover Fleay exhibited at the Leighton Galleries in 1945 where her work was commended for its "rather unfeminine strength and confidence of approach." Noted artist Arthur Streeton said her paintings "reflect great sympathy with and knowledge of the animals." She was also a writer and music teacher, and art director of the Daylesford School of Mines.

In 1905 she married William Henry Fleay at St. Peter's Church of England, Sturt Street, Ballarat. They had three children, including the naturalist David Fleay. She brought out a book with David, Gliders of the Gumtrees, for which she did the illustrations.

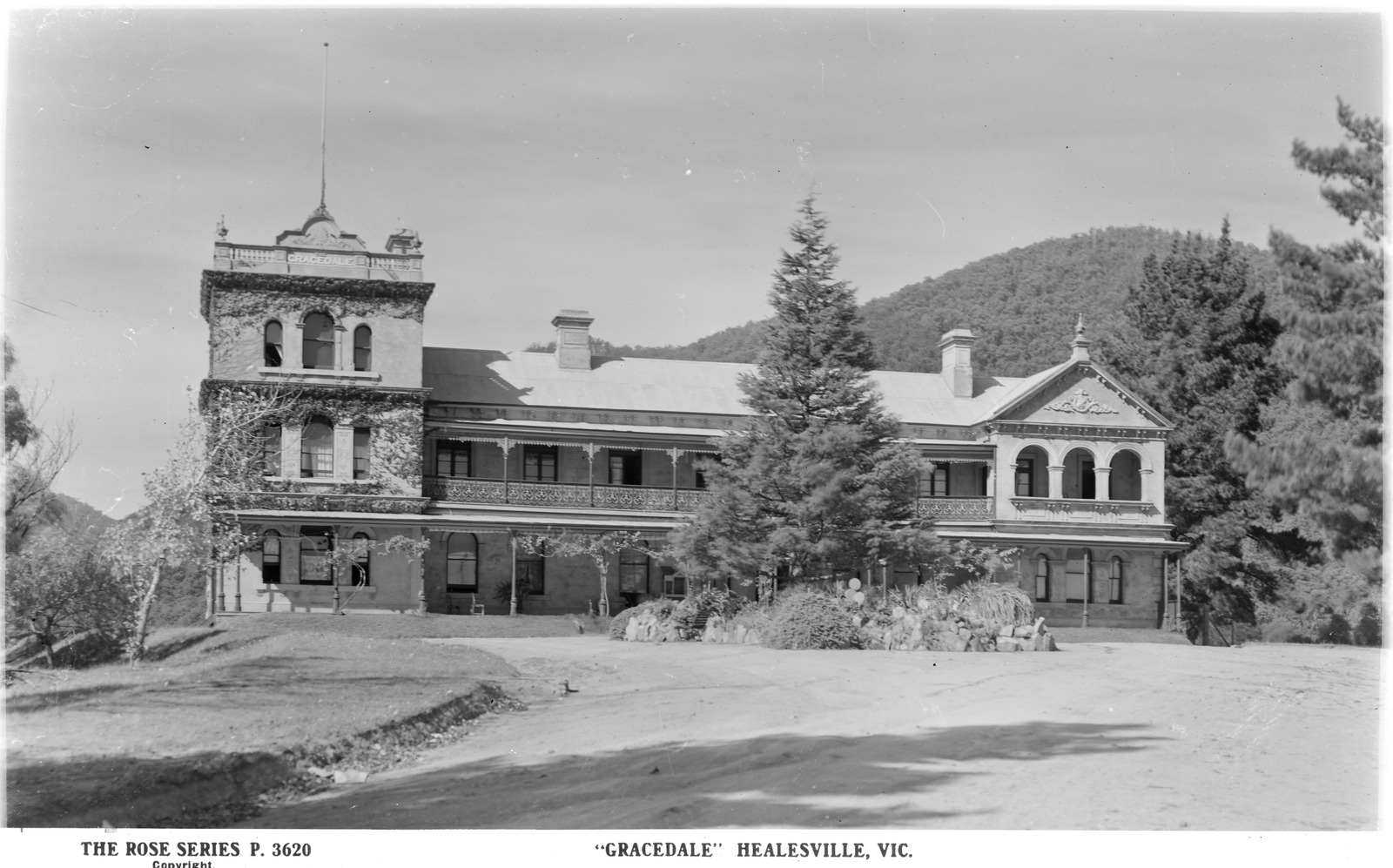
"Gracedale House", Healesville, Rose Stereograph Co

Fleay died on 18 May 1965 in Colac.

== Legacy ==
To honor her contribution to Australia's natural history, the Maude Glover Fleay Award was established by the Victorian College of the Arts. She gifted funds to establish a Maude Glover Fleay Bequest at the Art Gallery of Ballarat, for purchasing works by female artists. Her works "Gum trees", "End of day", and "Consider the lilies" are in the Gallery's collection. An exhibition showcasing her work, The Fabulous Maude, showed at The Lost Ones Contemporary Art Gallery in Ballarat in 2018.
