= White myrtle =

White myrtle is a common name for several plants and may refer to:

- Auranticarpa rhombifolia, native to eastern Australia
- Hypocalymma angustifolium, native to western Australia
