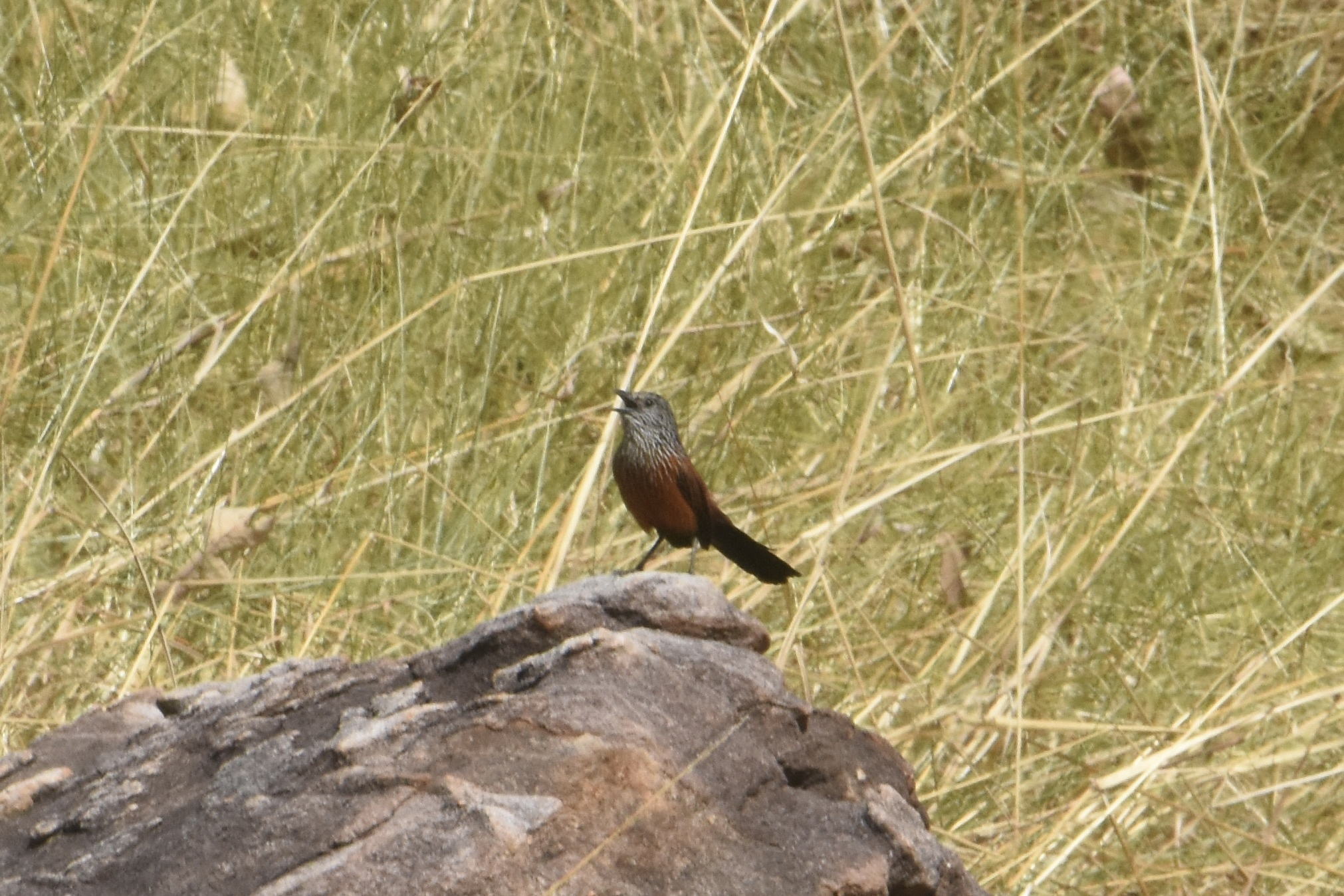

Conservation status
- Least Concern (IUCN 3.1)

Scientific classification
- Kingdom: Animalia
- Phylum: Chordata
- Class: Aves
- Order: Passeriformes
- Family: Maluridae
- Genus: Amytornis
- Species: A. housei

Binomial name
- Amytornis housei (Milligan, 1902)
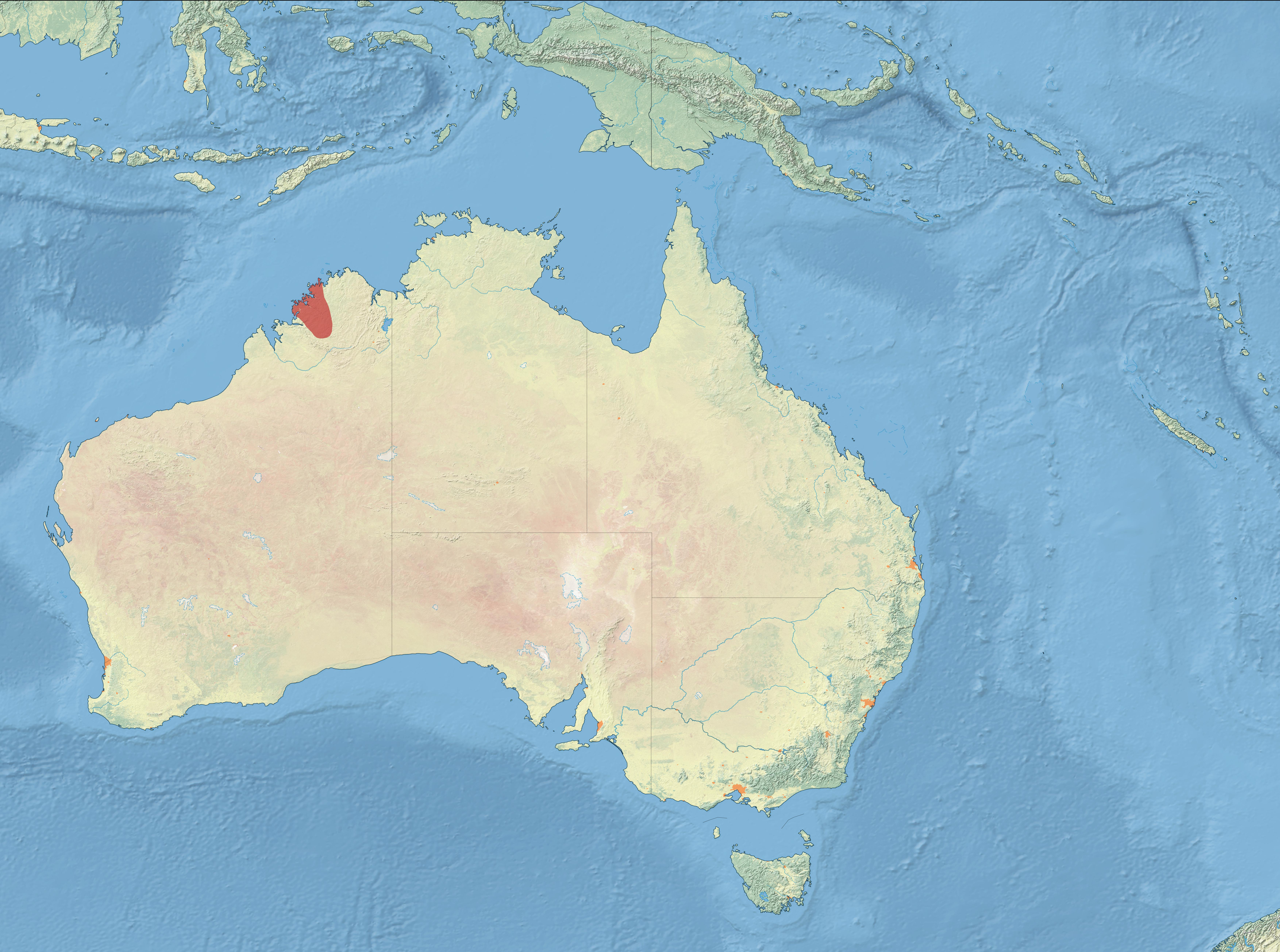
- Distribution

Synonyms
- Magnamytis kimberleyi, Mathews, 1923

= Black grasswren =

Species of bird

The black grasswren (Amytornis housei), known as dalal to the Wunambal people, is a species of bird in the family Maluridae. It is endemic to Western Australia.

Naturalist Frederick Maurice House discovered the black grasswren in 1901, as a part of a surveying party led by Frederick Slade Drake-Brockman through the Kimberley in northwestern Australia. He collected a single specimen. Alexander William Milligan, consulting ornithologist at the Western Australian Museum, named it after House when he described the species. The bird was not seen again until 1968, when Dan Freeman of the Natural History Museum led a party to the same area to find it.

Its natural habitat is Mediterranean-type shrubby vegetation and open woodland, punctuated by large sandstone boulders and slabs. It inhabits the Mitchell River National Park in the Kimberley region of north-west WA.

It has been classified as least concern. Bushfires have become more frequent, as has rainfall, which has altered the landscape. Black grasswrens are not highly mobile and have possibly become locally extinct around Manning Creek due to fire before 2007.

The black grasswren is seldom seen – even when most people visit (in the cooler months), it hides in cracks and fissures in sandstone. Its eggs and nest were only discovered in 1998, the lack of knowledge being because the region is largely inaccessible during the summer wet season.

It is present in the Charnley River–Artesian Range Wildlife Sanctuary in the Kimberley region of WA.

The nest is an oval structure of dried grass stems and leaves in tussocks of soft spinifex (Triodia pungens). It has an entrance in a small spout, with a landing in front of it. The female incubates the clutch, which generally consists of two eggs. The eggs are white with sparse dark markings and measure 21–22.2 mm long by 15.6–16.7 mm wide.
