= Uzucha =

Scientific classification
- Domain: Eukaryota
- Kingdom: Animalia
- Phylum: Arthropoda
- Class: Insecta
- Order: Lepidoptera
- Family: Xyloryctidae
- Genus: Uzucha; Walker, 1864

Moth genus in family Xyloryctidae

Uzucha is a genus of moths of the family Xyloryctidae.

== Species ==
- Uzucha borealis Turner, 1898
- Uzucha humeralis Walker, 1864
