= Egernia douglasi =

Conservation status
- Data Deficient (IUCN 3.1)

Scientific classification
- Kingdom: Animalia
- Phylum: Chordata
- Class: Reptilia
- Order: Squamata
- Family: Scincidae
- Genus: Egernia
- Species: E. douglasi

Binomial name
- Egernia douglasi Glauert, 1956

Synonyms
- Egernia striolata douglasi Glauert, 1956; Egernia douglasi — Storr, 1978

Species of lizard

Egernia douglasi, also known commonly as the Kimberley crevice-skink, is a species of lizard in the family Scincidae. The species is endemic to Australia.

== Etymology ==
The specific name, Douglasi, is in honor of Australian zoologist Athol M. Douglas.

== Geographic range ==
E. douglasi is found in the Australian state of Western Australia. It is present in the Charnley River-Artesian Range Wildlife Sanctuary in the Kimberley region of WA.

== Habitat ==
The preferred natural habitat of E. Douglasi is a rocky area in savanna.

== Reproduction ==
E. douglasi is ovoviviparous.
