= Kangerong Station =

Pastoral lease in Queensland

Coordinates: 19.6691°S 145.282°E

Location in Queensland

Kangerong Station is a pastoral lease that operates as a cattle station in Queensland.

It is situated about 113 kilometres (70 mi) north west of Charters Towers and 200 kilometres (124 mi) west of Townsville. Kangerong has double frontage to the Basalt River. Bordered by both Maryvale Station and Niall Station, all the properties are in the fertile basalt country and are flanked by the Clarke River, a tributary of the Burdekin River.

The property is divided into 30 paddocks with seven holding paddocks with a carrying capacity estimated at 9,000 cattle. The property has a homestead, guest accommodation, a dry-weather airstrip, staff quarters and steel stockyards.

Established at some time prior to 1864, in 1866 the lease occupied an area of 85 square miles (220 km^{2}) and the lessees were Hann, Bland, Daintree and Klingender.

It sold for A$16 million in 2008; the owner of the 224-square-kilometre (86 sq mi) property went into receivership in 2013.

It was passed in at auction in 2012 for A$12.75 million.

In 2014 the drought-struck station stocked with 3,500 cattle was sold at a discounted A$10 million to the Agricultural Investment Development Corporation on behalf of an overseas client.

== See also ==
- List of ranches and stations
