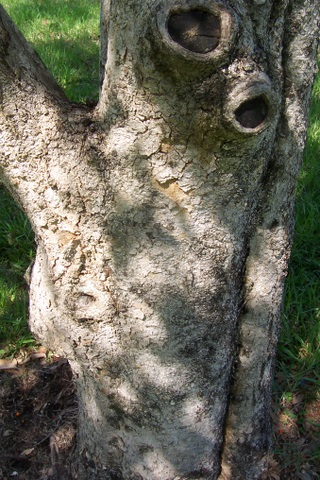
- Trunk of A. rhombifolia

Scientific classification
- Kingdom: Plantae
- Clade: Tracheophytes
- Clade: Angiosperms
- Clade: Eudicots
- Clade: Asterids
- Order: Apiales
- Family: Pittosporaceae
- Genus: Auranticarpa
- Species: A. rhombifolia

Binomial name
- Auranticarpa rhombifolia (A.Cunn. ex Hook.) L.Cayzer, Crisp & I.Telford

Synonyms
- Pittosporum rhombifolium (A.Cunn. ex Hook.)

= Auranticarpa rhombifolia =

Species of tree

Auranticarpa rhombifolia is a rainforest tree of eastern Australia. Known as the diamond leaf pittosporum, this tree is planted in many parts of Australia as an ornamental. The white flowers and orange fruit make it a most appealing street or garden tree. Other common names include hollywood, diamond leaf laurel, white myrtle and white holly.

Australian botanists examined the large genus Pittosporum in 2000 and decided the more northerly examples are significantly different from those in the south. Subsequently, a new genus was created Auranticarpa, which means "gold fruit".

The range of natural distribution is on red–brown basaltic soils from Richmond River, New South Wales (28° S) to Forty Mile Scrub National Park (18° S) in tropical Queensland.

== Description ==
A small tree, up to 25 metres in height and a trunk diameter of 45 cm. The bark is grey, irregular, not smooth and almost corky. Leaves are alternate, toothed in uneven patterns in the top half of the leaf, not toothed closer to the stem, rhomboid in shape, 5 to 10 cm long and 4 to 7 cm wide. Midrib, lateral and net veins are easily seen on both the upper and lower leaf surface.

=== Flowers and fruit ===
Small white flowers occur in a terminal corymb from November to January. Fruit is an orange pear-shaped capsule, 9 mm long with two or three oval black seeds. Fruits mature from February to May. Germination from fresh seed is slow, taking up to four months with around a third of seeds sending out roots and shoots.

== Uses ==
A very popular ornamental tree. It needs a well-drained soil. Full sun is required for a significant display of orange fruit.

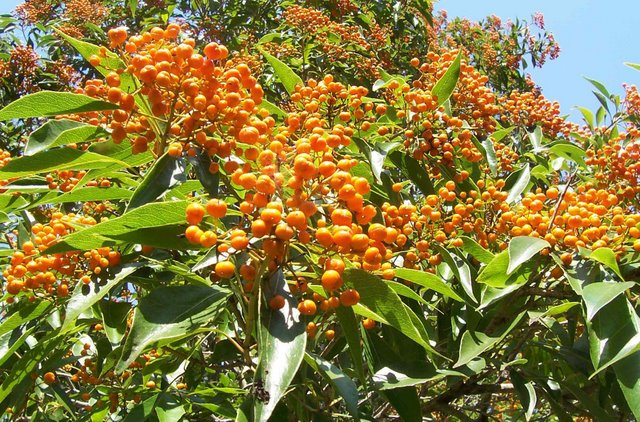
Auranticarpa rhombifolia – fruit at Wollongong Botanic Garden
