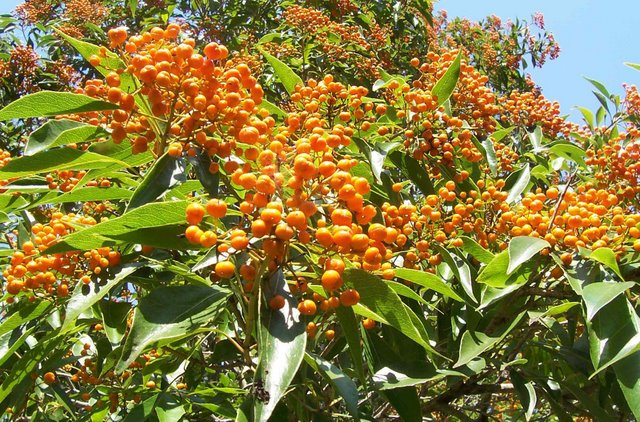
- Auranticarpa rhombifolia

Scientific classification
- Kingdom: Plantae
- Clade: Tracheophytes
- Clade: Angiosperms
- Clade: Eudicots
- Clade: Asterids
- Order: Apiales
- Family: Pittosporaceae
- Genus: Auranticarpa; L.Cayzer, Crisp & I.Telford

Type species
- Pittosporum rhombifolium A.Cunn. ex Hook.

Species
- See text

= Auranticarpa =

Genus of flowering plants

Auranticarpa is a genus of plants in the family Pittosporaceae, first described in 2000. It comprises six species from northern and eastern Australia. Three of the species were previously placed in the genus Pittosporum.

== Description ==
Plants in this genus are shrubs or trees that grow to heights between 5 and 30 m (16 and 98 ft). Juvenile leaves can vary somewhat from the mature stages in both size and shape. The inflorescences are much-branched corymbs; the flowers are bisexual (i.e. they have both male and female organs) and protandrous, meaning that each flower is functionally male when it initially opens, and later becomes functionally female. The fruits are orange/red capsules containing a number of black seeds.

== Distribution ==
The genus is endemic to Australia. One species occurs in Western Australia, another in the Northern Territory, and four species occur in Queensland, one of which extends into northern New South Wales.

== Taxonomy ==
The genus was erected in a paper published in 2000, following a revision of the Pittosporaceae family in Australia which identified two clades within the genus Pittosporum. The smaller clade included three described and three undescribed species, all of which were subsequently placed in the new genus Auranticarpa.

Auranticarpa differs from Pittosporum mainly in having bisexual flowers versus having male and female flowers on separate plants (see dioecy), and the seeds that are not coated in a sticky red resin. Additional more minute differences were described in the author's paper.

=== Species ===
- Auranticarpa edentata L.Cayzer, Crisp & I.Telford – Queensland
- Auranticarpa ilicifolia L.Cayzer, Crisp & I.Telford – Queensland
- Auranticarpa melanosperma (F.Muell.) L.Cayzer, Crisp & I.Telford – Northern Territory, Queensland
- Auranticarpa papyracea L.Cayzer, Crisp & I.Telford – Queensland
- Auranticarpa resinosa (Domin) L.Cayzer, Crisp & I.Telford – Western Australia
- Auranticarpa rhombifolia (A.Cunn. ex Hook.) L.Cayzer, Crisp & I.Telford – New South Wales, Queensland

=== Etymology ===
The name Auranticarpa comes from aurantius, 'red' or 'orange', and kărpós, 'fruit'. It is a reference to the colour of the fruit.
