= Alexander William Milligan =

Australian collector and ornithologist

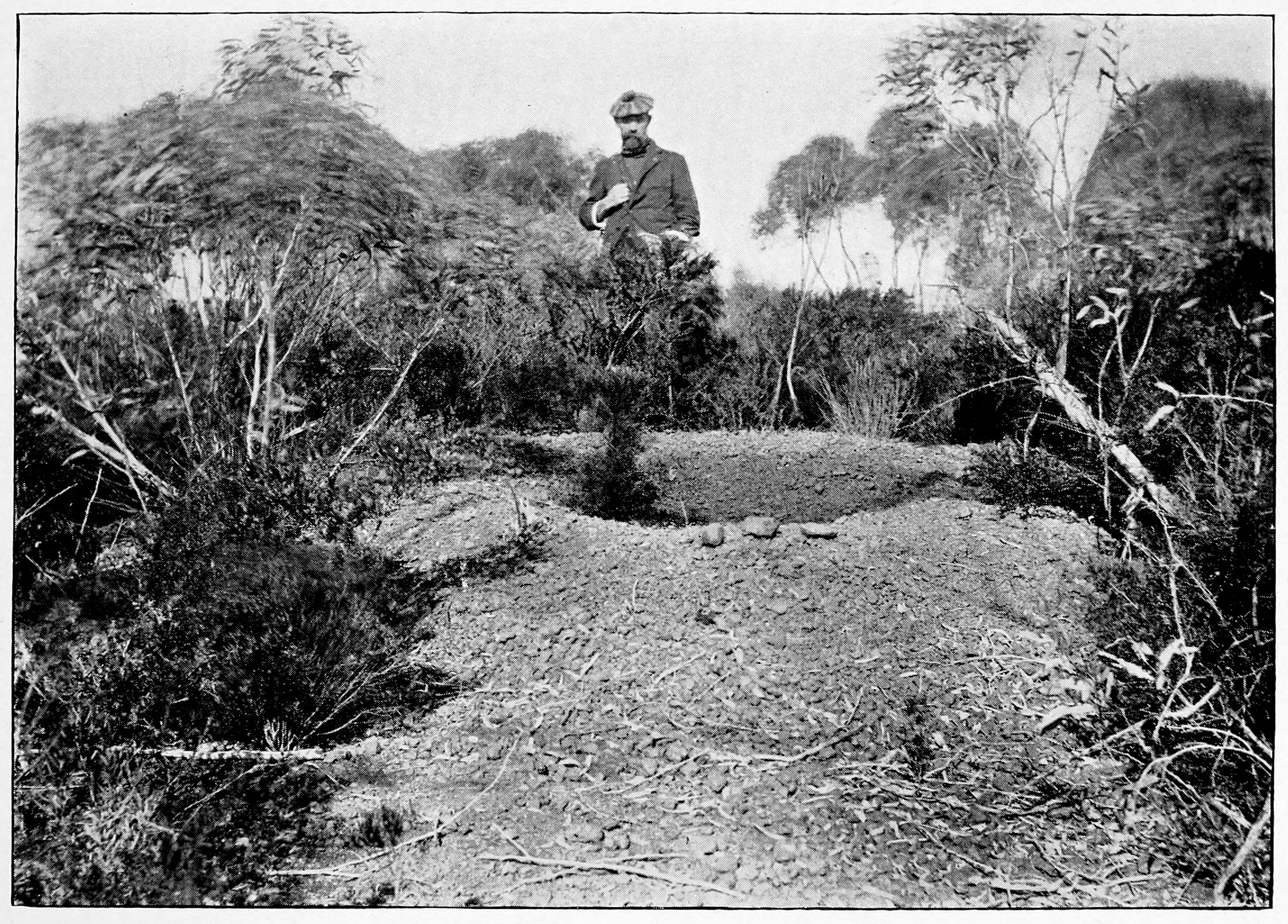
Milligan behind a malleefowl nest, Wongan, 1903

Alexander William Milligan (1858 – 30 March 1921) was an Australian accountant, legal clerk, zoological collector and ornithologist.

Milligan was born at Sulky Gully, near Ballarat in Victoria. He was educated at Guildford, Victoria. In 1897 he moved to Western Australia where he worked as a temporary accountant with the Department of Lands and Surveys. He was a founding member in 1901 of the Royal Australasian Ornithologists Union, with which he served as a member of the Checklist Committee. He was also the Honorary Consulting Ornithologist to the Western Australian Museum. In 1908 he moved back to Victoria where he died in St Kilda. Several birds were named after him by Gregory Mathews.

The Black Grasswren Amytornis housei was first described by Milligan in 1902 from specimens collected by Dr F. M. House during the Brockman surveying expedition to west Kimberley, Western Australia, in 1901.
