= Sulky Gully =

Australian gold discovery location

Coordinates: 37.4667°S 143.8667°E

Sulky Gully was the location of a gold discovery in the 1860s near what is now Ballarat, Victoria.
