= Frank Hann =

Australian pastoralist and explorer

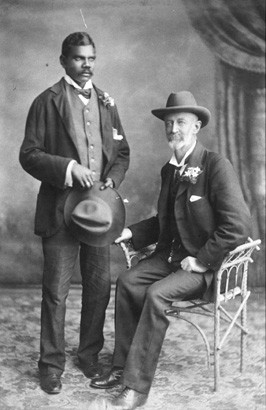
- Frank Hann (right) with his assistant Talbot
- Born: 19 October 1845
- Died: 21 August 1921 (aged 75); Perth, Australia

Frank Hugh Hann (19 October 1845 – 21 August 1921) was an Australian pastoralist and explorer.

== Early life ==
Hann was the son of Joseph and Elizabeth Hann. Fellow explorer William Hann was his older brother. They were born in Wiltshire, England and migrated with the family to the Western Port area of Victoria in 1851. In 1862 the family moved to the Burdekin River district, just north of Charters Towers in Queensland.

== Queensland 1862 – 1895 ==
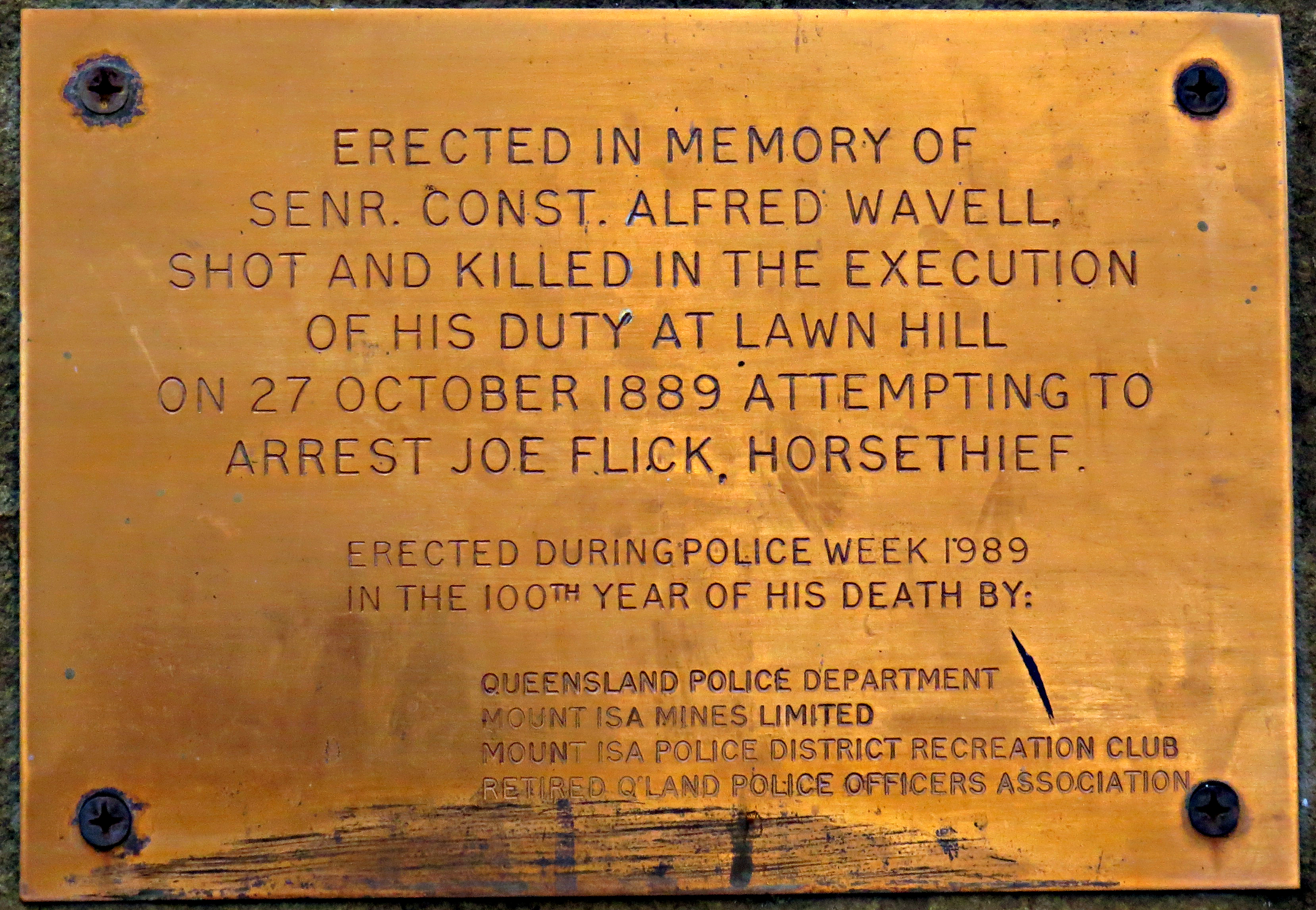
Memorial plaque in honour of Senior Constable Alfred Wavell

The Hann family with Richard Daintree and two others took up several holdings along the Clarke River, a tributary of the Burdekin River. The properties included Lolworth, Maryvale and Kangerong Stations. The young Hann boys grew up handling cattle and when their father died in January 1864, followed by their mother in June the same year, they assumed responsibility for the family's share of the properties. Frank became manager of Lolworth prior to turning 20 years old. By 1875 he had done well enough to stock Lawn Hill Station with wild cattle, and for twenty years made a business of supplying cattle to widespread goldfields throughout Queensland and the Northern Territory.

In 1881 he acted as a guide on a survey for a proposed transcontinental railway in northern Queensland. He discovered deposits of silver and lead in the Lawn Hill area, but commercial operation of the finds did not occur until 100 years later, leading to the present name of Century Mine.

Frank Hann and Jack Watson conducted a punitive massacre of Indigenous people on Waanyi country in 1883 and nailed the ears of forty people to the outside of the Lawn Hill homestead.

An escaped Indigenous outlaw named Joe Flick nearly ended Hann's life in 1889. Flick was hiding in Hann's Lawn Hill homestead after fatally shooting an officer of the Native Police (Alfred Wavell), when Hann confronted him upon returning home from a punitive expedition where he was out hunting "the blacks". The intruder agreed to converse with Hann but instead shot him in the chest at close range. Hann survived, but Flick was cornered and shot dead by other police in the early hours next morning.

== Western Australia 1896 – 1921 ==
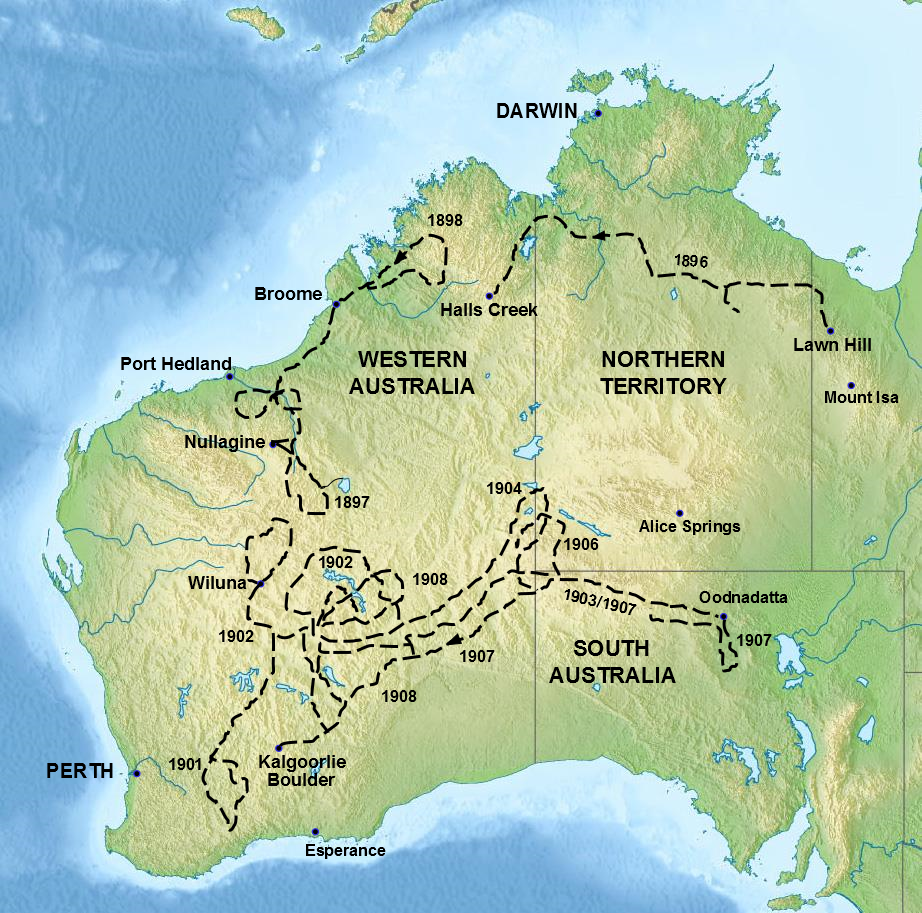
The expeditions of Frank Hann

By 1895 economic conditions had taken a downturn resulting in Hann walking off the station. He decided to try his luck in the north of Western Australia, so in 1896 with six Aboriginal companions and 67 horses he travelled overland from Lawn Hill to Halls Creek. Once in the west, despite being more than 50 years old, he carried out numerous expeditions partly financed by the government.

In 1897 from a base at Nullagine, Hann explored the east Pilbara, and noticed creeks in the area flowed inland. He followed them expecting to find a large fresh water lake, but to his disappointment the lake turned out to be salt. Consequently, he named the feature Lake Disappointment.

Hann's explorations covered a great deal of the state while searching for mineral wealth and pastoral prospects. From 1903 he based himself in a tent about 10 kilometres (6.2 mi) east of Laverton. His expeditions from the locality (shown as "Hann's Camp" on modern maps), extended as far as the Petermann Ranges in central Australia and Oodnadatta in South Australia. He left a legacy having named over 500 geographical features, including the rivers Rudall, Isdell, Charnley and Phillips (now the Hann); lakes Yeo and Rason; and ranges Mackay, Sir Frederick Bedford and McFadden Range.

In 1909 Hann shocked people in Perth by a report saying that he had an encounter with Wongi warriors north of Laverton, and regretted not shooting one as he wanted to get a skull for Fred Brockman to send to London. When outrage followed, he retracted his statement and later the authorities stated that he was just exaggerating, but was also no longer in the employ of the Surveyor General. Brockman subsequently wrote that Hann did get him a skull but it was from a person who had died four years earlier.

== Talbot ==
Hann maintained an association with an aboriginal man, Talbot, who seems to have been an assistant and possible companion. Daisy Bates, a good friend of Hann's recalled: "Talbot was as well educated as Frank Hann, and stayed with him, on terms of equality, at all hotels. Talbot was a Normanton native, & a very well mannered man."

== Later life ==
"Hann ruined himself," wrote Daisy Bates,"in his generosity to the groups round & about him." In 1918 he was injured in an accident which left him on crutches after which he retired to Perth, where he died in 1921. Hann was buried in the Karrakatta cemetery in Perth, and in October 1986 a memorial plaque was added to the gravesite.

== Legacy ==
Frank Hann National Park, Hann River and Mount Hann (15°50′24″S 125°49′12″E) are named in his honour.
