= Charnley River =

River in Western Australia

Coordinates: 16°23′38″S 124°59′29″E

Location
- Country: Australia

Physical characteristics
- Source
  - location: Caroline Ranges
  - elevation: 472 metres (1,549 ft)
- Mouth
  - location: Walcott Inlet
  - elevation: sea level
- Length: 148 km (92 mi)

The Charnley River is a river in the Kimberley region of Western Australia.

The river has its headwaters situated below Rocky Mountain in the Caroline Ranges and flows eastward across the Gardner Plateau and discharges into the Indian Ocean via Walcott Inlet.

There are seven tributaries of the Charnley River: Pearson River, Maurice Creek, Synnot Creek, Kalumba Creek, Bayonet Creek, Maudie Creek and Kaangulman Creek.

The Calder River also flows into Walcott Inlet.

Frank Hann named the Charnley river in 1898 after the pastoralist and miner Walter Chearnley from Nullagine, whose name was misspelled when Hann recorded the name in his diary.
