= Walcott Inlet =

Inlet in Western Australia

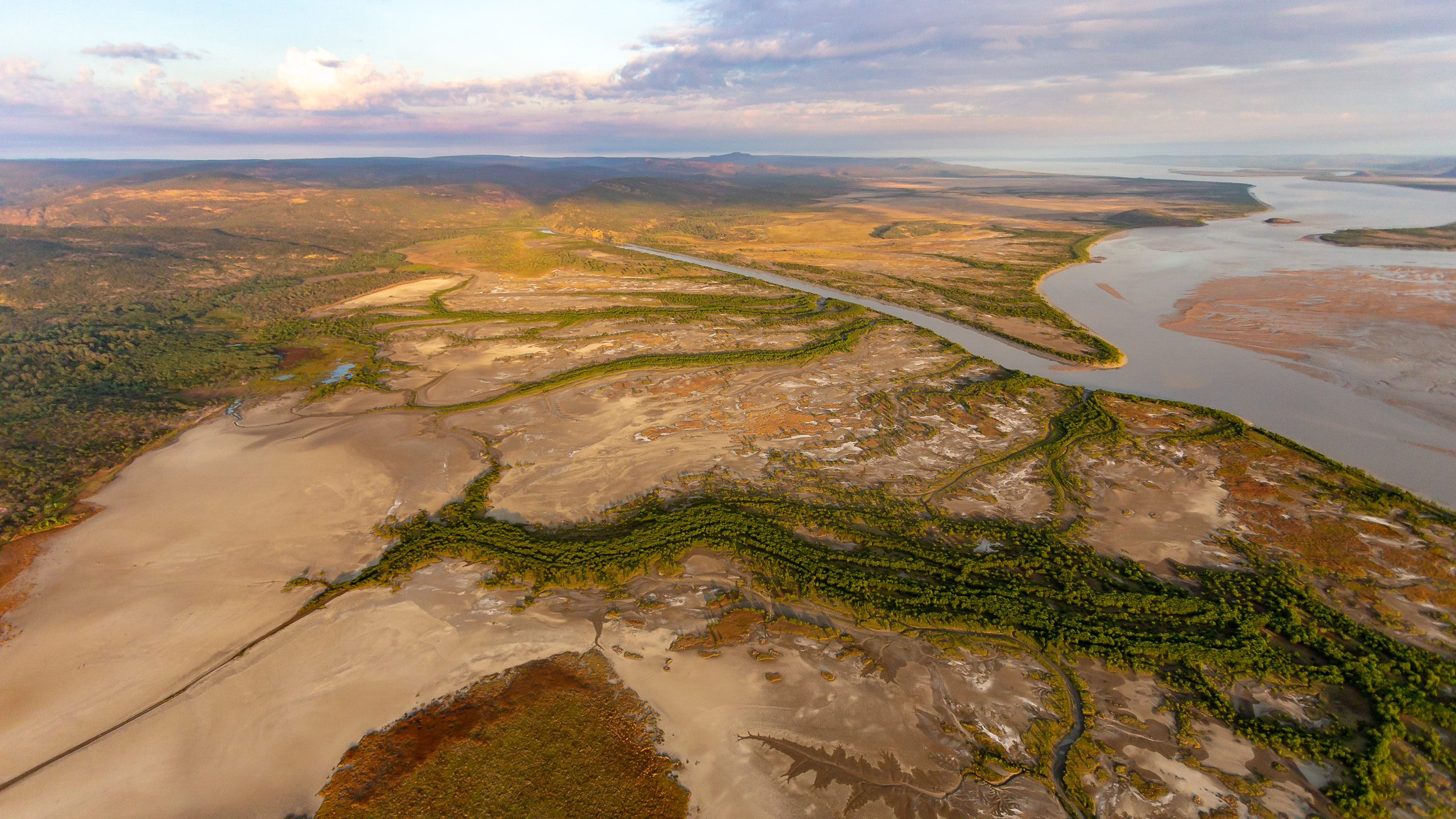
- The Isdell River mouth where it enters Walcott Inlet

- Interactive map of Walcott Inlet
- Coordinates: 16°22′55″S 124°34′55″E
- Country: Australia
- State: Western Australia
- LGA: Shire of Derby-West Kimberley

Walcott Inlet is an estuary located in the Kimberley region of Western Australia. It flows into Collier Bay, in the Indian Ocean, via a narrow gap known as Yule Entrance.

The inlet was named on 19 June 1865 by Trevarton Charles Sholl after Stephen Walcott, Commissioner of the Government Emigration Board, while on an exploratory expedition from the short-lived Camden Harbor settlement (in Camden Sound).

The inlet is 66 km (41 mi) in length, with a width of 9 km (5.6 mi) and covering an area of 257 km^{2} (99 sq mi). It is tide-dominated, and in nearly pristine condition with a catchment area of 12,732 square kilometres (4,916 sq mi). The entry to the inlet, known as Yule Entrance, is 9 km (5.6 mi) in length and as little as 450 m (1,480 ft) wide. The mean tidal range at the mouth is 6.52 m (21.4 ft), but can reach 11 metres (36 ft), leading to turbulence, strong tidal flows and whirlpools.

Three large rivers flow into the eastern end of the inlet: Charnley River, Calder River and Isdell River, via Yule Entrance. The Charnley River–Artesian Range Wildlife Sanctuary and Wilinggin Indigenous Protected Area are located near the inlet.

The name of Yule Entrance is likely derived from Presbyterian missionary Dr John Sandison Yule, who proposed a mission station at Walcott Inlet following a visit in 1910. A party led by lay missionaries Robert and Frances Wilson spent eight days in August 1911 investigating suitable sites before abandoning the project, due to lack of permanent fresh water.
