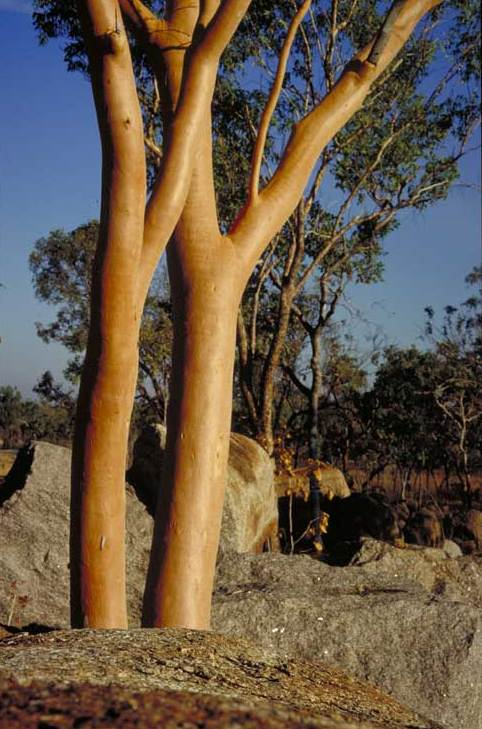
- Eucalyptus tintinnans at Pine Creek, Northern Territory

Scientific classification
- Kingdom: Plantae
- Clade: Tracheophytes
- Clade: Angiosperms
- Clade: Eudicots
- Clade: Rosids
- Order: Myrtales
- Family: Myrtaceae
- Genus: Eucalyptus
- Species: E. tintinnans

Binomial name
- Eucalyptus tintinnans (Blakely & Jacobs) L.A.S.Johnson & K.D.Hill

Synonyms
- Eucalyptus platyphylla var. tintinnans Blakely & Jacobs

= Eucalyptus tintinnans =

Ringing gum, hills salmon gum

Species of eucalyptus

Eucalyptus tintinnans, commonly known as the ringing gum or Hills salmon gum, is a small to medium-sized tree that is endemic to the Top End of the Northern Territory. It has smooth, colourful bark, round to triangular leaves, flower buds usually in groups of seven, white flowers and conical to hemispherical fruit.

== Description ==
Eucalyptus tintinnans is a tree that sometimes grows to a height of 15 m (49 ft), but usually shorter and often straggly. It is often deciduous by the end of the dry season. It has smooth orange to cream-coloured new bark that later becomes salmon pink and finally grey shortly before it is shed. Adult leaves are round to triangular, 55–110 mm (2.2–4.3 in) long and 35–60 mm (1.4–2.4 in) wide on a petiole 25–42 mm (0.98–1.65 in) long. The flower buds are arranged in leaf axils, usually in groups of seven, on a peduncle 2–6 mm (0.079–0.236 in) long, the individual buds sessile or on pedicels up to 5 mm (0.20 in) long. Mature buds are spherical, 4–7 mm (0.16–0.28 in) long and 3–6 mm (0.12–0.24 in) wide with a rounded to shortly beaked operculum. Flowering occurs from July to September and the flowers are white. The fruit is a woody conical to hemispherical capsule about 4 mm (0.16 in) long and 5–6 mm (0.20–0.24 in) wide with the valves near rim level or slightly protruding.

== Taxonomy and naming ==
Ringing gum was first formally described in 1934 by William Blakely and Maxwell Ralph Jacobs in Blakely's book A Key to the Eucalypts, and it was given the name Eucalyptus platyphylla var. tintinnans. In 1988, Lawrie Johnson and Ken Hill raised the variety to species status as Eucalyptus tintinnans. The specific epithet (tintinnans) is derived from Latin and refers to the ringing sound that hollow trees of this species often make when struck with an axe.

== Distribution and habitat ==
Eucalyptus tintinnans grows on sandy soil in hilly country or on low stony hills from near Stapleton to the Kakadu National Park and Katherine Gorge in the Top End.

== Conservation status ==
This eucalypt is classified as "least concern" under the Northern Territory Government Territory Parks and Wildlife Conservation Act.

== See also ==
- List of Eucalyptus species
