= Hann River =

River in Western Australia

Coordinates: 16°48′10″S 126°7′42″E

Location
- Country: Australia

Physical characteristics
- Source
  - location: below Pinnamutta-Murrawong Hill
  - elevation: 594 metres (1,949 ft)
- Mouth
  - location: confluence with Fitzroy River
  - elevation: 251 metres (823 ft)
- Length: 224 km (139 mi)
- Discharge
  - average: 711,000 ML/a (22.5 m^{3}/s; 796 cu ft/s)

The Hann River is a river in the Kimberley region of Western Australia.

The traditional owners of the areas around the river are the Wurla.

It was named after the first European to explore the river, Frank Hann, who had seen it during his expedition to the region in 1898 and named it the Phillips River. It was renamed in 1900 by the Surveyor General H F Johnston to honour Hann; a Philips River already existed in the south of the state.

The river rises below Mount Lacy and Sir John Gorge and then flows in a southerly direction past Mount Elizabeth then crossing the Gibb River Road. The river then cuts through the Barnett Range and then passes through the Phillips Range via Moll Gorge and flows through the Talbot Range until it flows into the Fitzroy River, of which it is a tributary, near Pinnamutta-Murrawong Hill.

The Hann has 12 tributaries, including Traine River, Barnett River, Harris Creek, Bella Creek, Macnamara Creek, Crocodile Creek and Grey Mare Creek.

The river has the only known specimens of the grass-like Whiteochloa sp. Hann River, a threatened species of Poaceae, located along its course.

Fish such as the western rainbowfish, the Kimberley archerfish, Greenway's grunter and the false spotted gudgeon have all been found within the river system.
