= Calder River (Western Australia) =

River in Western Australia

Coordinates: 16°18′16″S 125°3′26″E

Location
- Country: Australia

Physical characteristics
- Source
  - location: Elizabeth and Catherine Range
  - elevation: 365 metres (1,198 ft)
- Mouth
  - location: Walcott Inlet
  - elevation: sea level
- Length: 99 km (62 mi)

The Calder River is a river in the Kimberley region of Western Australia.

The river rises in the Elizabeth and Catherine Range and flows in a southerly direction eventually veering west along the northern edge of the Munja Aboriginal Reserve and discharging into the Indian Ocean via Walcott Inlet.

There are five tributaries to the Calder River: Tims Creek, Red Bull Creek, Bachsten Creek, Neville Creek and Brockman River.

Europeans first learned of the river in 1901 when the surveyor Frederick Slade Drake-Brockman came across the river while on an expedition in the area close to the river's mouth. Brockman named the river after John Calder, the leader of a prospecting party that was in area at the same time.
