= Isdell River =

River in Western Australia

Coordinates: 16°33′20″S 124°55′23″E

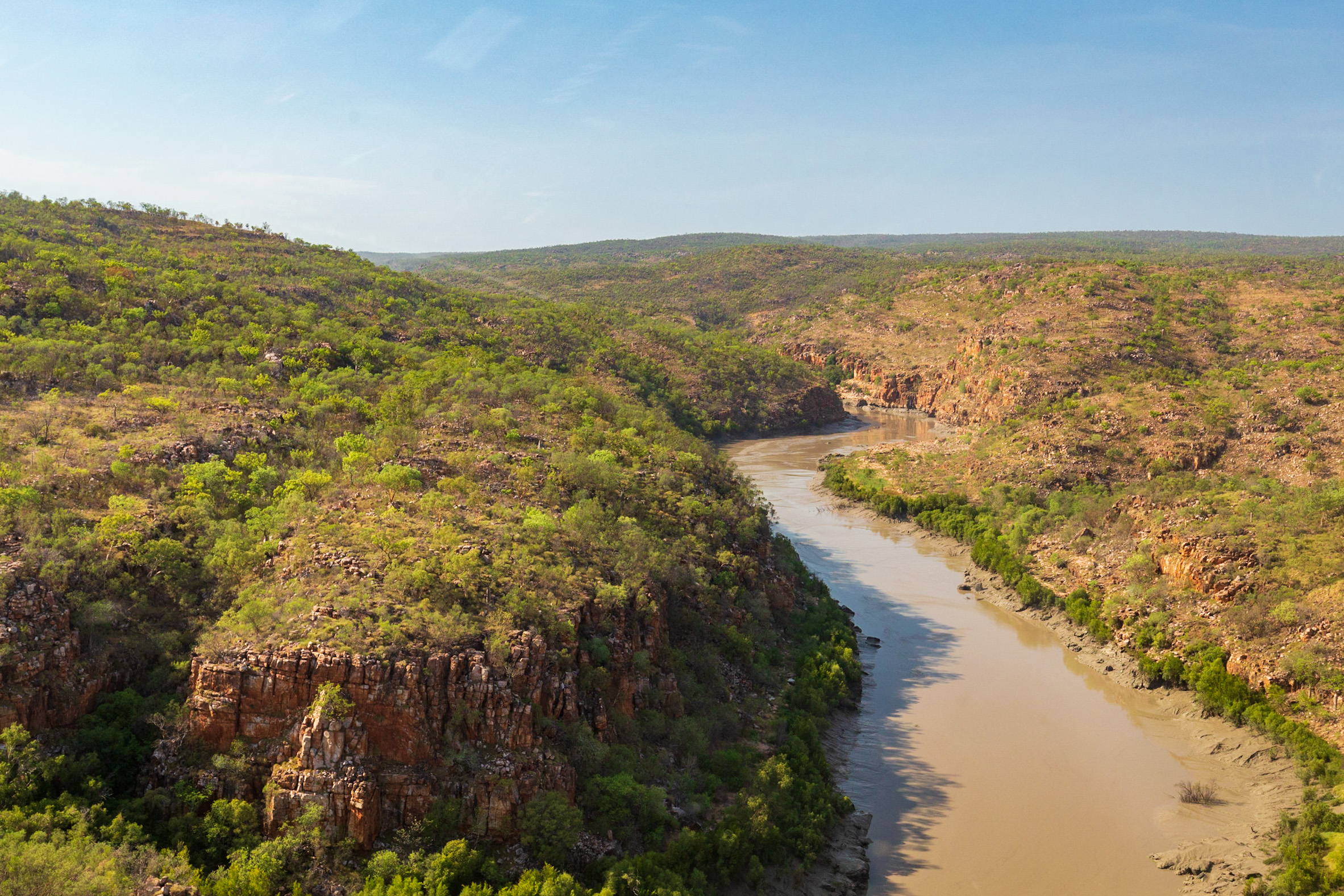

Location
- Country: Australia

Physical characteristics
- Source
  - location: Packhorse Range
  - elevation: 515 metres (1,690 ft)
- Mouth
  - location: Walcott Inlet
  - elevation: sea level
- Length: 206 km (128 mi)
- Basin size: 5,540 km^{2} (2,140 sq mi)

The Isdell River is a river in the Kimberley region of Western Australia, named in 1898 by explorer Frank Hann after James Isdell, who was prominent in the region and later served as a member of parliament.

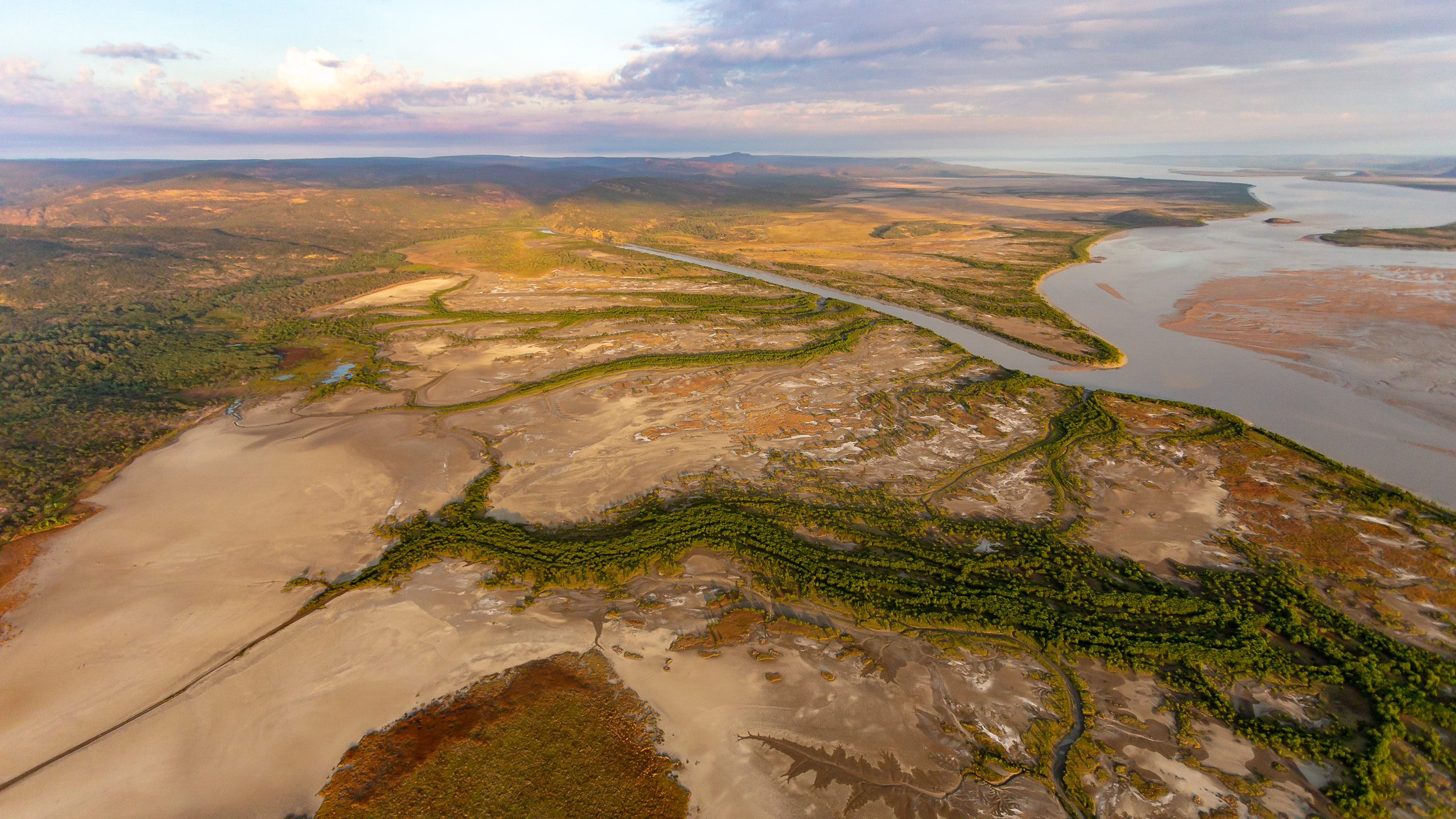
Isdell River mouth (centre right of image) where it joins Walcott Inlet

The river rises in the Packhorse Range and flows in a south- westerly direction until it reaches Isdell Gorge at the foot of the Wunaamin Miliwundi Range where it changes to a north-westerly direction before discharging into the eastern end of Walcott Inlet.

The river has eleven tributaries, including Sprigg River, Woolybutt Creek, Cadjuput Creek, Woomera Creek and Tulmulnga Creek.

The traditional owners are the Wangina Wunggurr Willingin people, who maintain a strong connection to the river despite disruptions by pastoral activities.
