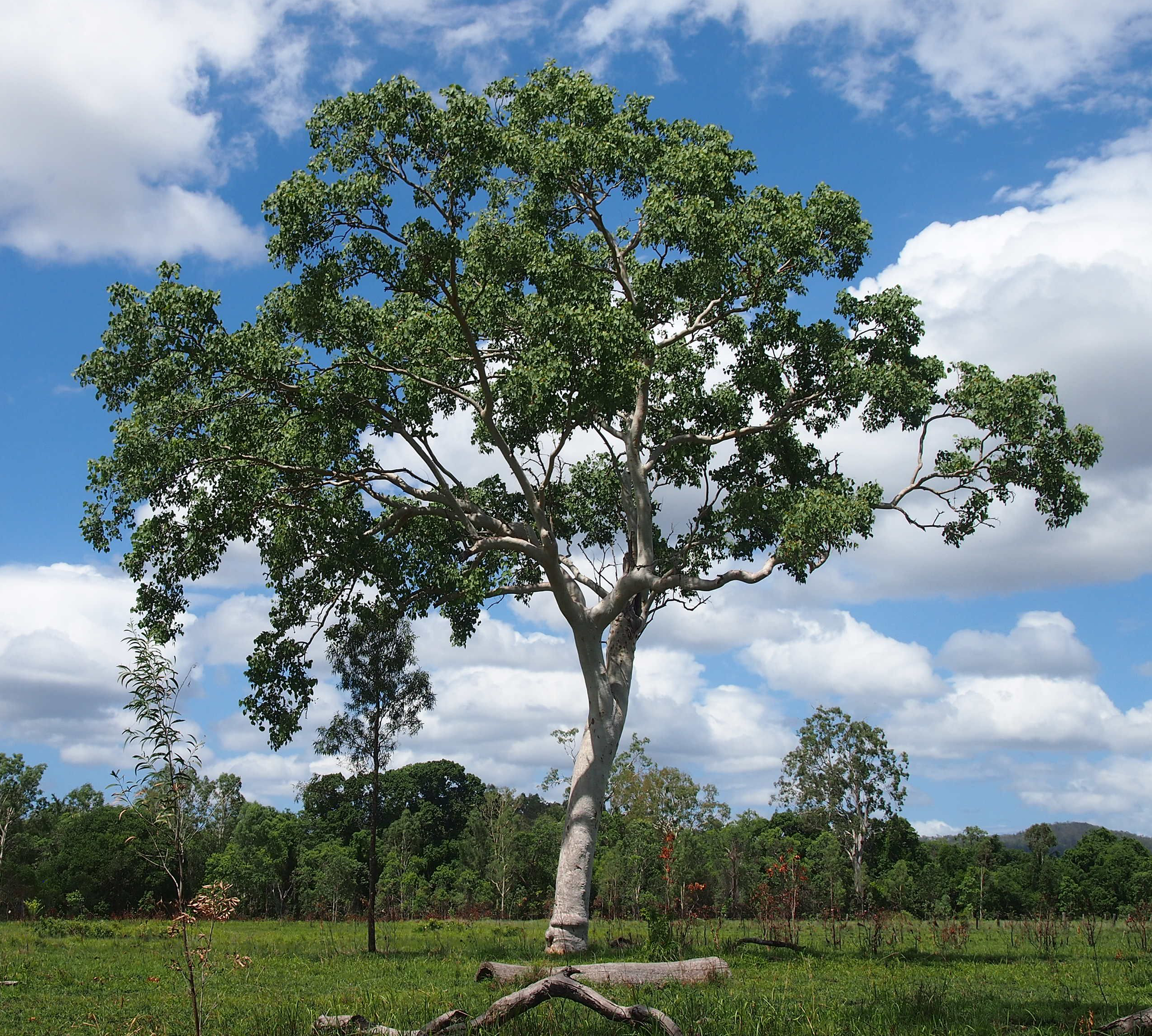

Scientific classification
- Kingdom: Plantae
- Clade: Embryophytes
- Clade: Tracheophytes
- Clade: Spermatophytes
- Clade: Angiosperms
- Clade: Eudicots
- Clade: Rosids
- Order: Myrtales
- Family: Myrtaceae
- Genus: Eucalyptus
- Species: E. platyphylla

Binomial name
- Eucalyptus platyphylla F.Muell.

= Eucalyptus platyphylla =

Poplar gum

Species of eucalyptus

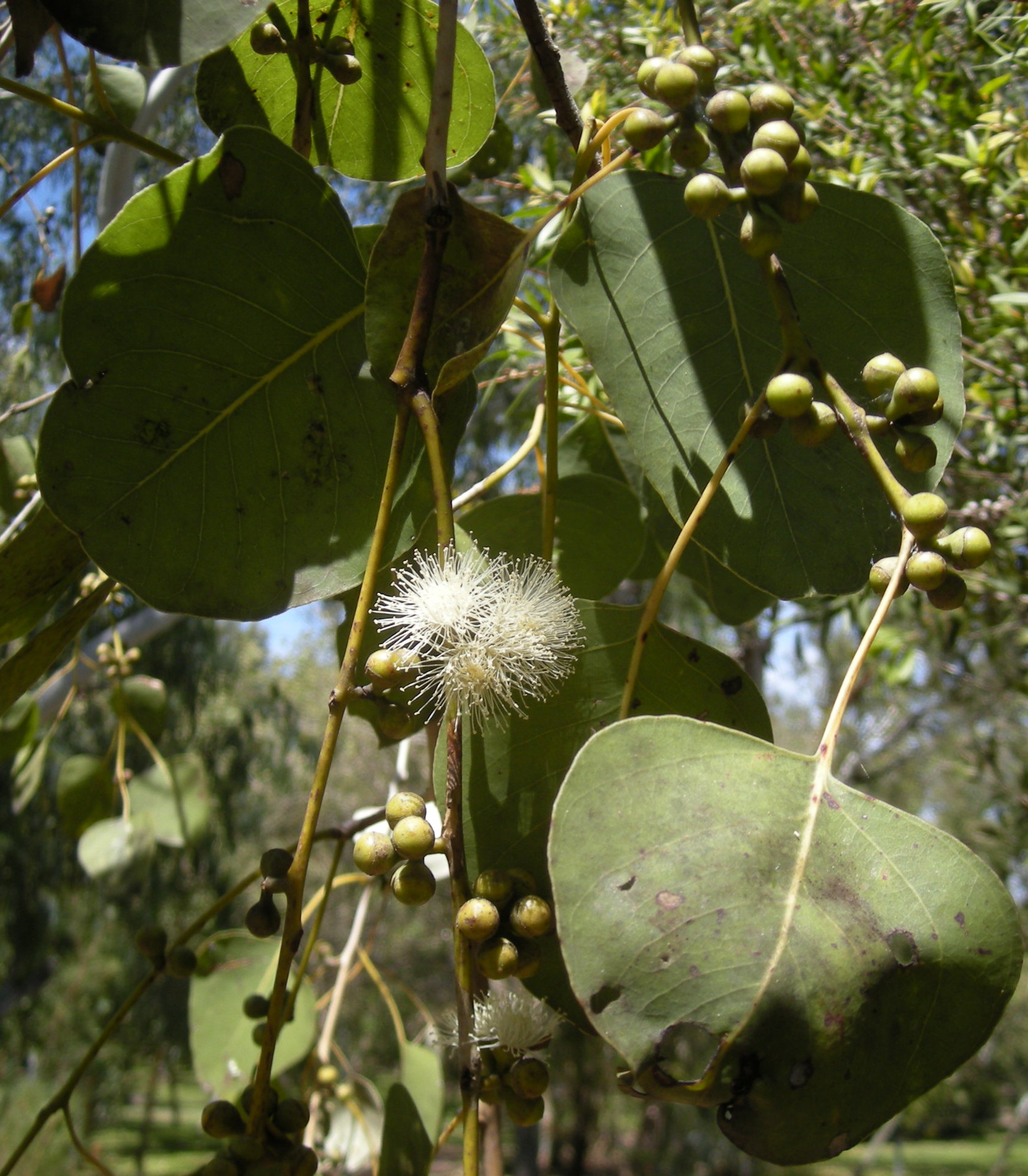
Flower buds and flowers

Eucalyptus platyphylla, commonly known as poplar gum or white gum, is a species of medium-sized tree that is endemic to Queensland. It has smooth, powdery bark, heart-shaped, egg-shaped to almost round leaves, flower buds in groups of seven, white flowers and conical to hemispherical fruit.

== Description ==
Eucalyptus platyphylla is a tree that typically grows to a height of 20 m (66 ft) and forms a lignotuber. It has smooth, powdery, pale pink to greenish white bark. Young plants and coppice regrowth have deltoid leaves that are 90–200 mm (3.5–7.9 in) long and 60–165 mm (2.4–6.5 in) wide. Adult leaves are the same shade of dull greyish green on both sides, heart-shaped to egg-shaped or almost round, 50–210 mm (2.0–8.3 in) long and 35–120 mm (1.4–4.7 in) wide on a petiole 25–70 mm (0.98–2.76 in) long. The flower buds are arranged in leaf axils in groups of seven on an unbranched peduncle 3–8 mm (0.12–0.31 in) long, the individual buds sessile or on pedicels up to 6 mm (0.24 in) long. Mature buds are oval to almost spherical, 6–9 mm (0.24–0.35 in) long and 5–7 mm (0.20–0.28 in) wide with a rounded to conical operculum. Flowering occurs from June to October and the flowers are white. The fruit is a woody, conical to hemispherical capsule 3–6 mm (0.12–0.24 in) long and 6–10 mm (0.24–0.39 in) wide with the valves near rim level or slightly protruding.

== Taxonomy and naming ==
Eucalyptus platyphylla was first formally described in 1859 by Ferdinand von Mueller in Journal of the Proceedings of the Linnean Society, Botany from material collected near the Burdekin River. The specific epithet (playtphylla) is from ancient Greek words meaning "flat", "wide" or "broad" and "-leaved", referring to the broad leaves.

== Distribution and habitat ==
Poplar gum is mostly found within 100 km (62 mi) of the coast in soils that often remain wet for long periods. It occurs from Horn Island in the Torres Strait to near Rockhampton.

== Conservation status ==
This eucalypt is listed as "least concern" under the Queensland Government Nature Conservation Act 1992.

== See also ==
- List of Eucalyptus species
