= Prince regent (disambiguation) =

A prince regent (including a list of such regents) executes a monarch's prerogative when they are incapable of ruling.

Prince regent may also refer to:

== People ==
- Alois, Hereditary Prince of Liechtenstein (born 1968), regent of Hans-Adam II, Prince of Liechtenstein, since 2004
- George IV (1762–1830; r. 1820–1830), prince regent of George III, King of the United Kingdom, from 1811 to 1820

== Animals ==
- Prince Regent gudgeon, a species of fish
- Prince Regent hardyhead, a species of fish

== Places ==
- Prince Regent DLR station, London, England, United Kingdom
- Prince Regent Inlet, Nunavut, Canada
- Prince Regent River, Western Australia, Australia, including the
  - Prince Regent National Park

== Ships ==
- HMS Prince Regent, various Royal Navy ships
- Prince Regent (ship), various ships

== Other uses ==
- Prince Regent (horse), an Irish racehorse
- Prince Regent (TV series), 1979

== See also ==
- Prince Regent and Mitchell River Important Bird Area, Australia
- Regent (disambiguation)
