= Hibbertia mollis =

Scientific classification
- Kingdom: Plantae
- Clade: Tracheophytes
- Clade: Angiosperms
- Clade: Eudicots
- Order: Dilleniales
- Family: Dilleniaceae
- Genus: Hibbertia
- Species: H. mollis

Binomial name
- Hibbertia mollis Toelken

Species of plant

Hibbertia mollis is a species of flowering plant in the family Dilleniaceae and is endemic to a restricted part of Western Australia. It is a shrub with hairy, ridged branches, narrow elliptic-oblong leaves, and yellow flowers arranged singly in leaf axils with about twenty-four stamens arranged in bundles around two densely scaly carpels.

== Description ==
Hibbertia mollis is a shrub with only a few ridged branches and that typically grows to a height of up to 40 cm (16 in) high, the foliage covered with hairs or shield-shaped scales. The leaves are elliptic-oblong, 25–40 mm (0.98–1.57 in) long and 4–8 mm (0.16–0.31 in) wide on a petiole 0.3–1 mm (0.012–0.039 in) long. The flowers are arranged singly in leaf axils along the branches on a stiff, thread-like peduncle 4.2–5.6 mm (0.17–0.22 in) long, with oblong to strap-like bracts 3.6–4.2 mm (0.14–0.17 in) long. The five sepals are joined at the base, the two outer sepal lobes 7.2–7.5 mm (0.28–0.30 in) long and the inner lobes 4.4–4.8 mm (0.17–0.19 in) long. The five petals are wedge-shaped to lance-shaped with the narrower end towards the base, yellow, 2.2–2.6 mm (0.087–0.102 in) long and there are about twenty-four stamens of several different lengths arranged in bundles around the two densely scaly carpels, each carpel with two ovules. Flowering occurs in June.

== Taxonomy ==
Hibbertia mollis was first formally described in 2010 by Hellmut R. Toelken in the Journal of the Adelaide Botanic Gardens from specimens collected near Prince Frederick Harbour in 1985. The specific epithet (mollis) means "soft", referring to the hairs on the foliage of this species.

== Distribution and habitat ==
This hibbertia is only known from the type specimen that was growing on a sandstone outcrop at the mouth of the Hunter River in the Northern Kimberley biogeographic region of Western Australia.

== Conservation status ==
Hibbertia mollis is only known from the type specimen but is classified as "not threatened" by the Western Australian Government Department of Parks and Wildlife.

== See also ==
- List of Hibbertia species
