= Prince Regent and Mitchell River Important Bird Area =

Important Bird Area in Western Australia

Coordinates: 15°22′45″S 125°25′58″E

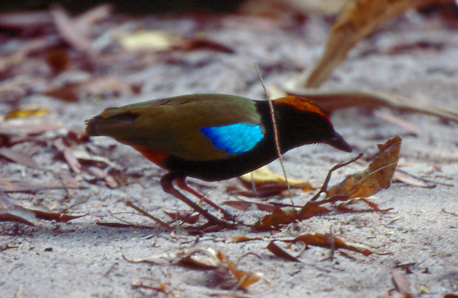
The IBA is an important site for rainbow pittas

The Prince Regent and Mitchell River Important Bird Area is a 7333 km^{2} tract of land comprising several contiguous protected areas in the north-west Kimberley region of northern Western Australia. It includes the Mitchell Plateau.

== Description ==
The site consists of the Prince Regent, the Mitchell River and Lawley River National Parks, and the Camp Creek and Laterite Conservation Parks. The climate is monsoonal; the average annual rainfall of over 1200 mm is the highest in the north-west Kimberley, sustaining the richest patches of rainforest in the region. Because it has not been stocked with cattle, which damage woodland habitats, riverine vegetation and alluvial flats, it carries relatively high densities of key bird species. Much of the country is rugged, constituted of Wunaamin Miliwundi sandstones. The Mitchell Plateau is a bauxitic laterite plateau with Livistona palm forests. On the coast there are substantial areas of mangroves.

=== Threats ===
Threats to the area's biodiversity come from uncontrolled bushfires, feral animals (especially cats), and increasing numbers of wild cattle.

== Birds ==
The site has been identified by BirdLife International as an Important Bird Area (IBA) because it supports the largest known population of the western subspecies of the partridge pigeon as well as chestnut rails, white-quilled rock-pigeons and rainbow pittas. It contains most of the world populations of black grasswrens and Kimberley honeyeaters. It also supports several species restricted to tropical savanna habitats, chestnut-backed buttonquails, varied lorikeets, northern rosellas, white-gaped, yellow-tinted, bar-breasted and banded honeyeaters, silver-crowned friarbirds, sandstone shrike-thrushes, white-browed robins, canary white-eyes, masked and long-tailed finches.

== Other animals ==
The area is one of only two in Australia that retains a largely intact mammal fauna. It contains populations of golden bandicoots, golden-backed tree rats, scaly-tailed possums, monjons and Kimberley rock rats. The rich herpetofauna found in the many small rainforest patches includes endemic reptiles such as the rough-scaled python. There are several species of camaenid land snails.
