= Acacia spectrum =

Conservation status
- Priority Two — Poorly Known Taxa (DEC)

Scientific classification
- Kingdom: Plantae
- Clade: Tracheophytes
- Clade: Angiosperms
- Clade: Eudicots
- Clade: Rosids
- Order: Fabales
- Family: Fabaceae
- Subfamily: Caesalpinioideae
- Clade: Mimosoid clade
- Genus: Acacia
- Species: A. spectrum

Binomial name
- Acacia spectrum Lewington & Maslin

Species of legume

Acacia spectrum, also known as Kimberley ghost wattle, is a shrub of the genus Acacia and the subgenus Plurinerves that is endemic to arid parts of north western Australia.

== Description ==
The shrub typically grows to a height of 4 to 6 m (13 to 20 ft) and has slender stems, pendulous branched and an open habit with a wispy and open crown. It has glabrous branchlets with caducous stipules that are often covered in a fine white and powdery coating. Like most species of Acacia it has phyllodes rather than true leaves. The evergreen and glabrous phyllodes have a filiform shape and are straight to slightly incurved with a length of 30 to 60 cm (12 to 24 in) and a width of 1.5 to 2 mm (0.059 to 0.079 in) and have four yellowish longitudinal nerves.

== Taxonomy ==
The species was first formally named as Acacia spectra by the botanists Margaret A. Lewington and Bruce Maslin in 2009 as a part of the work Three new species of Acacia (Leguminosae: Mimosoideae) from the Kimberley Region, Western Australia as published in the journal Nuytsia. The holotype was collected in 2005 below sandstone cliffs along the Mitchell River. It grew abundantly in shrubland habitat with Acacia deltoidea, Acacia kelleri, and Grevillea cunninghamii.

== Distribution ==
It is native to a small area of the Kimberley region of northern Western Australia. where it is limited to two separate populations situated approximately 1 km (0.62 mi) apart in the Mitchell River National Park where it is situated among sandstone outcrops growing in shallow sandy soils as a part of mixed shrubland communities

== See also ==
- List of Acacia species
