= Acacia diastemata =

Sandstone pavement wattle

Conservation status
- Priority Three — Poorly Known Taxa (DEC)

Scientific classification
- Kingdom: Plantae
- Clade: Tracheophytes
- Clade: Angiosperms
- Clade: Eudicots
- Clade: Rosids
- Order: Fabales
- Family: Fabaceae
- Subfamily: Caesalpinioideae
- Clade: Mimosoid clade
- Genus: Acacia
- Species: A. diastemata

Binomial name
- Acacia diastemata Maslin, M.D.Barrett & R.L.Barrett
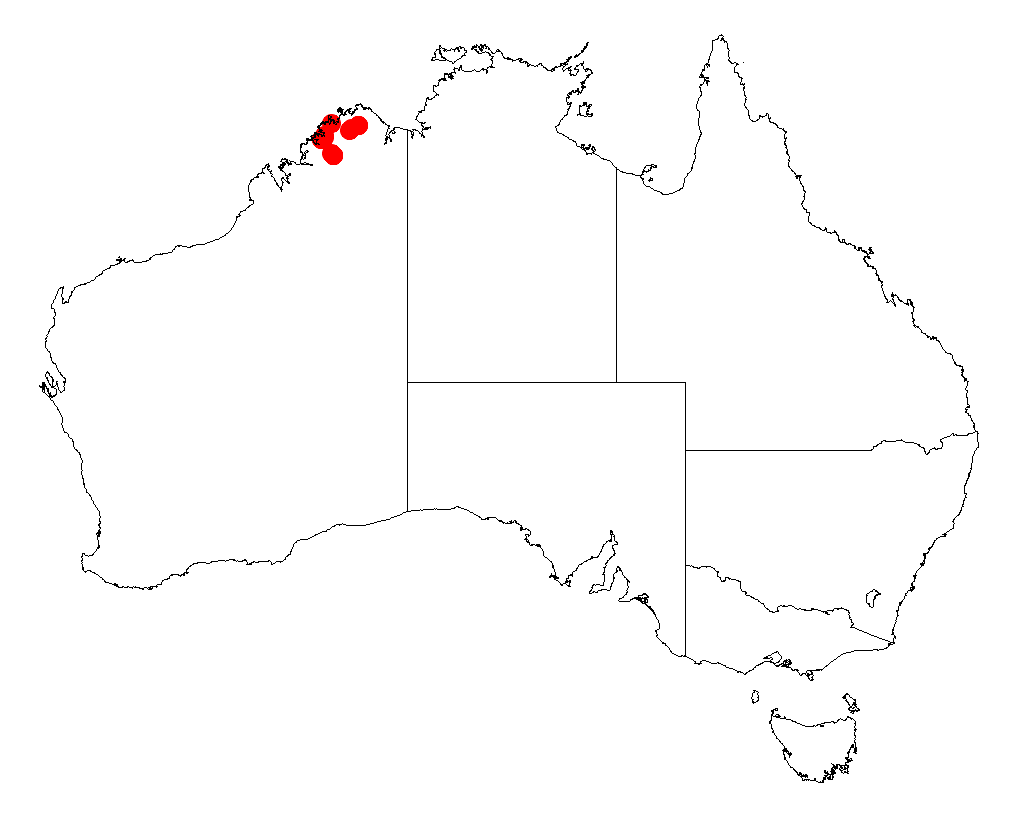
- Occurrence data from AVH

Species of legume

Acacia diastemata, also known as the sandstone pavement wattle, is a species of flowering plant in the family Fabaceae and is endemic to the Kimberley region of Western Australia. It is an erect shrub or small tree with erect, narrowly linear phyllodes, spikes of light golden yellow flowers and narrowly linear, thinly leathery to crust-like pods.

== Description ==
Acacia diastemata is an erect shrub or small tree that typically grows to a height of 2 to 5 m (6 ft 7 in to 16 ft 5 in) and has grey, fibrous bark and terete, glabrous branchlets. Its phyllodes are erect, narrowly linear, 90–160 mm (3.5–6.3 in) long and 1–2 mm (0.039–0.079 in) wide, thin, pliable, green and glabrous with three widely spaced longitudinal veins and a blunt point on the end. The flowers are light golden yellow and borne in two spikes 25–35 mm (0.98–1.38 in) long in axils on a peduncle 1.5–3 mm (0.059–0.118 in) long. Flowering has been observed in late January and probably flowers in the wet season. The pods are narrowly linear, slightly constricted and rounded over the seeds, thinly leathery to crust-like, 40–70 mm (1.6–2.8 in) long and 2.0–2.5 mm (0.079–0.098 in) wide, slightly curved or straight, brown and glabrous. The seeds are oblong, 2.0–2.5 mm (0.079–0.098 in) long, 1.2–1.4 mm (0.047–0.055 in) wide and compressed to about 1 mm (0.039 in) thick with a bright yellow or cream-coloured aril.

== Taxonomy ==
Acacia diastemata was first formally described in 2013 by Bruce Maslin, Matthew David Barrett and Russell Lindsay Barrett in the journal Nuytsia from specimens collected east of Mount Trafalgar in the Kimberley region in 2007. The specific epithet (diastemata) is an allusion to the distinct spaces between the flowers and flower clusters, producing interrupted spikes.

== Distribution ==
Sandstone pavement wattle is native to an area in the east Kimberley region of Western Australia where it is widespread but in localised populations from around the Prince Regent River in the south west to around the Roe River in the north and to the Drysdale River National Park in the east. Its geographic range extends over approximately 200 km (120 mi) along a south-west/north-east axis and it grows on massive sandstone pavements in small stands with a variety of species at each known locality, including Acacia kenneallyi, Hibiscus superbus, Macarthuria vertex and species of Triodia and Triumfetta.

== Conservation status ==
Acacia diastemata is listed as "Priority Three" by the Government of Western Australia Department of Parks and Wildlife, meaning that it is poorly known and known from only a few locations but is not under imminent threat.

== See also ==
- List of Acacia species
