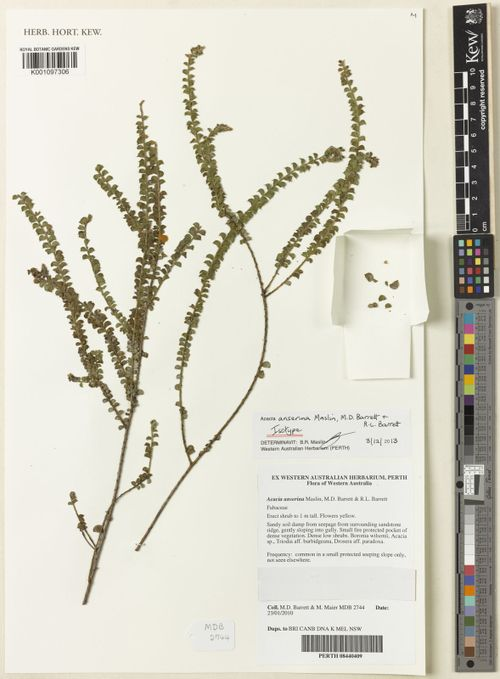
- Isotype (K001097306) collected in the Kimberley in Prince Regent Nature Reserve

Conservation status
- Priority Two — Poorly Known Taxa (DEC)

Scientific classification
- Kingdom: Plantae
- Clade: Tracheophytes
- Clade: Angiosperms
- Clade: Eudicots
- Clade: Rosids
- Order: Fabales
- Family: Fabaceae
- Subfamily: Caesalpinioideae
- Clade: Mimosoid clade
- Genus: Acacia
- Species: A. anserina

Binomial name
- Acacia anserina Maslin, M.D.Barrett & R.L.Barrett

= Acacia anserina =

Hairy sandstone wattle

Species of legume

Acacia anserina, also known as hairy sandstone wattle, is a species of flowering plant in the family Fabaceae and is endemic to a small area in the Kimberley region of Western Australia. It is an erect, openly-branched shrub with its branchlets densely covered with soft hairs, widely elliptic to widely egg-shaped phyllodes with the narrower end towards the base, spherical heads of 17 to 25 light golden flowers, and narrowly oblong pods up to 4–5 mm (0.16–0.20 in) wide.

== Description ==
Acacia anserina is an erect, openly-branched shrub that typically grows to a height of around 1 m (3 ft 3 in) and has an erect, openly branched habit. Its branchlets are densely covered with soft, white hairs and are ribbed when young. Its phyllodes are divided into two equal halves, usually widely elliptic but some times widely egg-shaped with the narrower end towards the base, mostly 4–6 mm (0.16–0.24 in) long and 2.5–4 mm (0.098–0.157 in) wide, the lower edge more or less straight. The leaves have hairs similar to those on the branchlets and many indistinct veins, the tip with a short pointed tip, 0.5–1 mm (0.020–0.039 in) long. There are narrowly triangular stipules 1.0–1.5 mm (0.039–0.059 in) long at the base of the petioles. The flowers light golden-coloured and arranged singly in spherical heads of 17 to 25 on a peduncle 6–8 mm (0.24–0.31 in) long in axils of phyllodes. The fruit is a narrowly oblong pod 4–5 mm (0.16–0.20 in) wide.

== Taxonomy ==
Acacia anserina was first formally described in 2013 by the botanists Bruce Maslin, Matthew David Barrett and Russell Lindsay Barrett in the journal Nuytsia from specimens collected in the Prince Regent National Park in 2010. The specific epithet (anserina) means 'pertaining to geese', referring to the shape of the phyllodes, that resemble the shape of a goose's neck, head and beak.

== Distribution and habitat ==
The type specimen was collected from a pocket of dense vegetation on a gentle slope in the Princess May Range (in Prince Regent National Park) in the northern Kimberley Region of Western Australia, with about 200 plants in an area 50 m (160 ft) across.

== Conservation status ==
This species of wattle is listed as "Priority Two" by the Government of Western Australia Department of Biodiversity, Conservation and Attractions, meaning that it may be threatened but is poorly known, only occurring in a few locations.

== See also ==
- List of Acacia species
