= Acacia synantha =

Conservation status
- Priority Two — Poorly Known Taxa (DEC)

Scientific classification
- Kingdom: Plantae
- Clade: Tracheophytes
- Clade: Angiosperms
- Clade: Eudicots
- Clade: Rosids
- Order: Fabales
- Family: Fabaceae
- Subfamily: Caesalpinioideae
- Clade: Mimosoid clade
- Genus: Acacia
- Species: A. synantha

Binomial name
- Acacia synantha Maslin, M.D.Barrett & R.L.Barrett

Species of legume

Acacia synantha, also known as sandstone synchronous wattle, is a tree or shrub belonging to the genus Acacia and the subgenus Juliflorae. It is native to a small area in the Kimberley region of Western Australia.

== Description ==
The glabrous shrub has an erect habit and typically grows to a height of around 1.5 m (4 ft 11 in). It has angled to flattened brownish grey coloured branchlets that are resin ribbed. The dull green phyllodes become greyish with age. The phyllodes have an elliptic to ovate-elliptic shape with a length of 3 to 7 cm (1.2 to 2.8 in) and a width of 10 to 25 mm (0.39 to 0.98 in) and have four to seven longitudinal nerves. The simple inflorescences occur in groups of two to five are situated in the axils of new phyllodes. The spikes have a length of 3 to 4 cm (1.2 to 1.6 in) and the flowers are widely spaced.

== Distribution ==
The shrub is endemic to a small area of the western Kimberley region and is found in only three separate populations scattered over an area of approximately 20 km (12 mi) in the northern part of the Prince Regent National Park.

== See also ==
- List of Acacia species
