= Heywood Island =

Heywood Island may refer to:

- Heywood Island (Antarctica) in the South Shetland Islands group
- Heywood Island (Western Australia) off the Kimberley coast
