= Grevillea cravenii =

Conservation status
- Endangered (IUCN 3.1)

- Priority Two — Poorly Known Taxa (DEC)

Scientific classification
- Kingdom: Plantae
- Clade: Embryophytes
- Clade: Tracheophytes
- Clade: Spermatophytes
- Clade: Angiosperms
- Clade: Eudicots
- Order: Proteales
- Family: Proteaceae
- Genus: Grevillea
- Species: G. cravenii

Binomial name
- Grevillea cravenii Makinson

Species of shrub endemic to Western Australia

Grevillea cravenii is a species of flowering plant in the family Proteaceae and is endemic to a small area along the north west coast of the Kimberley region of Western Australia. It is a spreading to weakly erect shrub with narrowly oblong leaves with lobed or toothed edges, and purplish-red to dark maroon flowers.

== Description ==
Grevillea cravenii is a spreading to weakly erect shrub that typically grows to a height of 30–50 cm (12–20 in) and has many stems. The leaves are usually narrow oblong in outline, mostly 50–90 mm (2.0–3.5 in) long and 20–25 mm (0.79–0.98 in) wide, with 7 to 17 teeth or shallow lobes 1–5 mm (0.039–0.197 in) long and 3–8 mm (0.12–0.31 in) wide on the outer edges. The flowers are arranged in groups on a rachis 9–25 mm (0.35–0.98 in) long and are purplish-red to dark maroon, the pistil 33–40 mm (1.3–1.6 in) long and hairy. Flowering occurs in December and January and the fruit is a hairy follicle.

== Taxonomy ==
Grevillea cravenii was first formally described in 2000 by Robert Owen Makinson in the Flora of Australia, based on plant material collected by Matthew David Barrett in the Prince Regent River Reserve in 1999. The specific epithet (cravenii) honours Lyndley Craven.

== Distribution and habitat ==
Grevillea cheilocarpa grows in grassy woodland where it is only known from the type location in the Prince Regent National Park.

== Conservation status ==
This grevillea is listed as endangered on the IUCN Red List of Threatened Species as it is only known from approximately 200 rametes. The number of mature individuals is unknown and is suspected to be less than the currently known population.

It is also listed as priority two by the Western Australian Government Department of Biodiversity, Conservation and Attractions, meaning that it is poorly known and from only one or a few locations.

== See also ==
- List of Grevillea species
