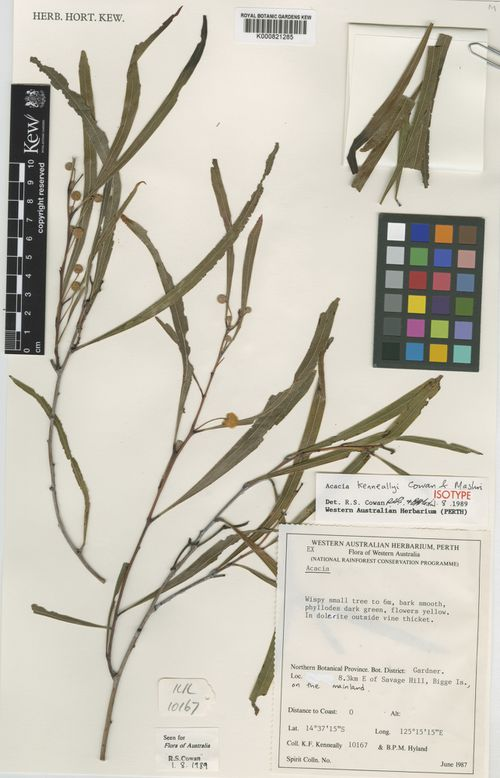
- Isotype

Conservation status
- Priority Three — Poorly Known Taxa (DEC)

Scientific classification
- Kingdom: Plantae
- Clade: Embryophytes
- Clade: Tracheophytes
- Clade: Spermatophytes
- Clade: Angiosperms
- Clade: Eudicots
- Clade: Rosids
- Order: Fabales
- Family: Fabaceae
- Subfamily: Caesalpinioideae
- Clade: Mimosoid clade
- Genus: Acacia
- Species: A. kenneallyi

Binomial name
- Acacia kenneallyi R.S.Cowan & Maslin
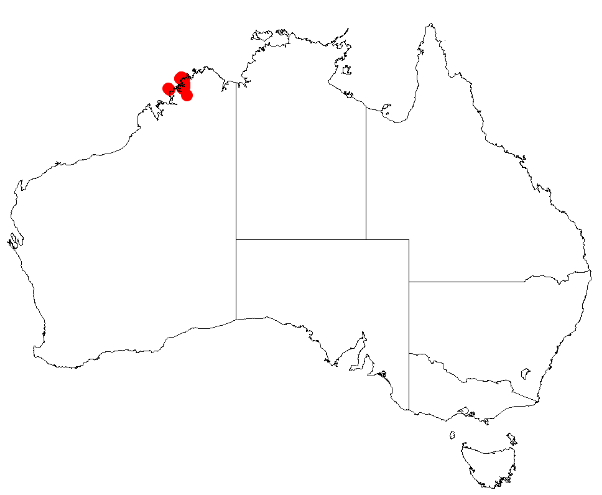
- Occurrence data from AVH

Synonyms
- Racosperma kenneallyi (R.S.Cowan & Maslin) Pedley

= Acacia kenneallyi =

Species of legume

Acacia kenneallyi is a species of flowering plant in the family Fabaceae and is endemic to the far north-west of Western Australia. It is an openly branched, spindly tree or shrub with narrowly elliptic to linear phyllodes, spherical heads of golden yellow flowers in racemes in axils or on the ends of branches, and linear, leathery to more or less woody pods.

== Description ==
Acacia kenneallyi is a spindly tree or shrub that typically grows to a height of 2–7 m (6 ft 7 in – 23 ft 0 in) and has terete and glabrous branchlets that are covered with a fine white powdery bloom. Its phyllodes are narrowly elliptic to linear, straight to slightly curved, 150–250 mm (5.9–9.8 in) long and 6–14 mm (0.24–0.55 in) wide, leathery and glabrous with a prominent central vein. Its flowers are borne in spherical heads in racemes 20–100 mm (0.79–3.94 in) long in axils or on the ends of branches on up to four peduncles 8–25 mm (0.31–0.98 in) long, each head about 5 mm (0.20 in) in diameter with 46 to 56 densley arranged golden yellow flowers. Flowering occurs from May to June, and the pods are linear, straight and flat, up to 110 mm (4.3 in) long, 10–11 mm (0.39–0.43 in) wide, leathery to more or less woody and glabrous. The (immature) seeds have a helmet-shaped aril on the end.

== Taxonomy ==
Acacia kenneallyi was first formally described in 1995 by Richard Sumner Cowan and Bruce Maslin in the journal Nuytsia from specimens collected on the mainland 8.3 km (5.2 mi) east and across from Savage Hill on Bigge Island in Western Australia. The specific epithet (kenneallyi) honours Kevin F. Kenneally who collected most of the specimens of the species, and is "an authority on the flora of the Kimberley, based on years of collecting and observing the plants of that region.

The species is closely related to A. spectra and A. latescens.

== Distribution and habitat ==
This species of wattle grows in sand over sandstone and over dolomite, usually in woodland, and is restricted to the Bonaparte Archipelago from Heywood Island and north-east to Bigge Island and the nearby mainland in the Northern Kimberley bioregion of far north-west Western Australia.

== Conservation status ==
Acacia kenneallyi is listed as "Priority Three" by the Government of Western Australia Department of Parks and Wildlife, meaning that it is poorly known and known from only a few locations but is not under imminent threat.

== See also ==
- List of Acacia species
