= Acacia barrettiorum =

Barrett's wattle

Conservation status
- Priority Two — Poorly Known Taxa (DEC)

Scientific classification
- Kingdom: Plantae
- Clade: Tracheophytes
- Clade: Angiosperms
- Clade: Eudicots
- Clade: Rosids
- Order: Fabales
- Family: Fabaceae
- Subfamily: Caesalpinioideae
- Clade: Mimosoid clade
- Genus: Acacia
- Species: A. barrettiorum

Binomial name
- Acacia barrettiorum Lewington & Maslin
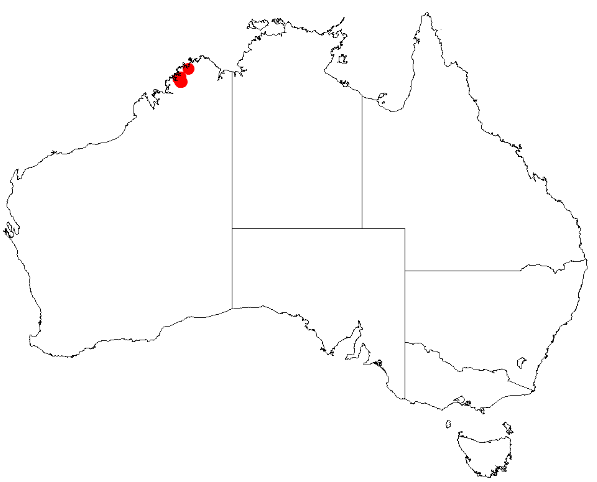
- Occurrence data from AVH

Species of shrub

Acacia barrettiorum, commonly known as the Barrett's wattle, is a species of flowering plant in the family Fabaceae and is endemic to the Prince Regent Nature Reserve in the Kimberley region of Western Australia. It is a glabrous shrub with crowded triangular phyllodes, spherical heads of light golden-yellow flowers and linear, papery to thinly leathery pods up to 60 mm (2.4 in) long.

== Description ==
Acacia barrettiorum is a sprawling to ascending, glabrous shrub that typically grows to a height of 1–2.5 m (3 ft 3 in – 8 ft 2 in) and up to 3.5 m (11 ft) wide. It has elongated, yellow scars where phyllodes have fallen. Its phyllodes are crowded, triangular to oblong, sessile 1.5–3 mm (0.059–0.118 in) long and 1–3 mm (0.039–0.118 in) wide with a bristly point 0.5–2 mm (0.020–0.079 in) long on the end and three to seven three to seven indistinct longitudinal veins on each side. The flowers are borne on single spherical heads in axils on a peduncle 4–4 mm (0.16–0.16 in) long, each head with 30 to 40 light golden yellow flowers. The pods are narrowly linear, papery to thinly leathery, 30–60 mm (1.2–2.4 in) long and 2–3 mm (0.079–0.118 in) wide. The seeds are oblong, black, 3–4 mm (0.12–0.16 in) long with a white aril on the end.

== Taxonomy ==
Acacia barrettiorum was first formally described in 2009 by the botanists Margaret Lewington and Bruce Maslin in the journal Nuytsia from specimens collected by Matthew David Barrett and Russell Lindsay Barrett in 2003. The common name and the species epithet honour the collectors of the type specimens.

== Distribution and habitat ==
Barrett's wattle is endemic to Prince Regent Nature Reserve in the Northern Kimberley bioregion of Western Australia where two small disjunct populations are known. The shrub grows in shallow sandy soils over and around sandstone as a part of low shrubland with spinifex.

== Conservation status ==
Acacia barrettiorum is listed as "Priority Two" by the Government of Western Australia Department of Biodiversity, Conservation and Attractions, meaning that it is poorly known and from one or a few locations.

== See also ==
- List of Acacia species
