= Hibbertia ledifolia =

Conservation status
- Priority One — Poorly Known Taxa (DEC)

Scientific classification
- Kingdom: Plantae
- Clade: Tracheophytes
- Clade: Angiosperms
- Clade: Eudicots
- Order: Dilleniales
- Family: Dilleniaceae
- Genus: Hibbertia
- Species: H. ledifolia

Binomial name
- Hibbertia ledifolia Benth.

Species of flowering plant

Hibbertia ledifolia is a species of flowering plant in the family Dilleniaceae and is endemic to the Kimberley region of Western Australia. It is an erect shrub that typically grows to a height of 1–2 m (3 ft 3 in – 6 ft 7 in) and has yellow flowers from April to June. It was first formally described in 1863 by George Bentham in Flora Australiensis from specimens collected from York Sound by Allan Cunningham. The specific epithet (ledifolia) means "Ledum-leaved", referring to the broom-like shape of the shrub.

Hibbertia ledifolia grows in rocky sandstone soils in the northern Kimberley region of Western Australia. It is classified as "Priority One" by the Government of Western Australia Department of Parks and Wildlife, meaning that it is known from only one or a few locations that are potentially at risk.

== See also ==
- List of Hibbertia species
