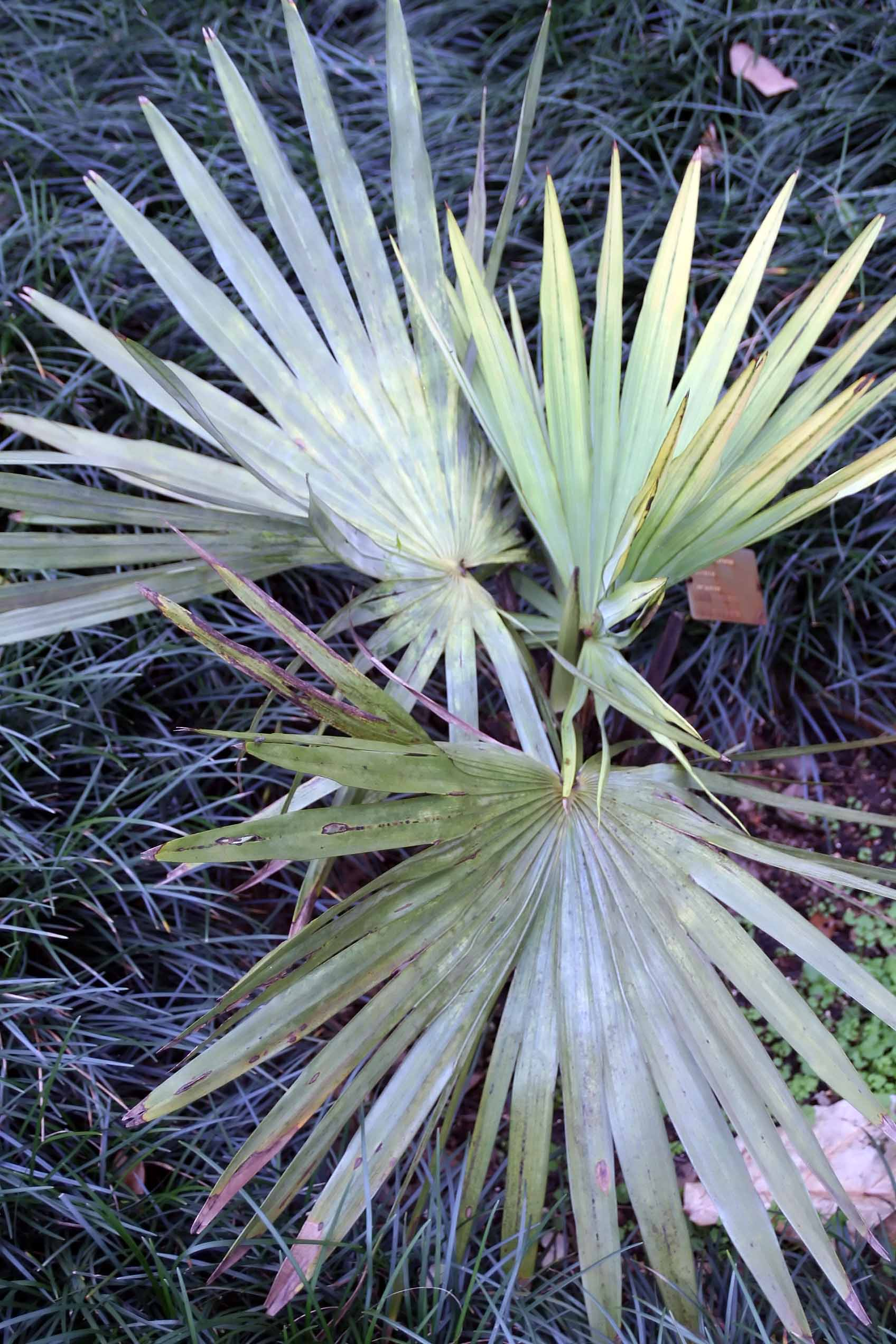

Conservation status
- Least Concern (IUCN 3.1)

Scientific classification
- Kingdom: Plantae
- Clade: Tracheophytes
- Clade: Angiosperms
- Clade: Monocots
- Clade: Commelinids
- Order: Arecales
- Family: Arecaceae
- Tribe: Trachycarpeae
- Genus: Livistona
- Species: L. eastonii

Binomial name
- Livistona eastonii C.A.Gardner

= Livistona eastonii =

Species of palm

Livistona eastonii is a species of flowering plant in the family Arecaceae. It is a palm tree native to the Kimberley Region of northern Western Australia.

Plants grow up 15 meters tall. They are functionally dioecious, flowering from April to September and fruiting from December to June.

The species is native to the Mitchell Plateau, which has a strongly monsoonal climate. The palms grow in large colonies on flat sites and depressions in open woodland from 100 to 380 metres elevation, typically on lateritic soils.
