= Lawley River National Park =

National park in Western Australia

- Location within Western Australia
- Lawley River National Park (●) is in the Shire of Wyndham–East Kimberley
- Type: National park
- Location: Kimberley region
- Coordinates: 14.6779°S 125.9136°E
- Area: 17,572 ha (43,420 acres)
- Established: 2000
- Administrator: Department of Biodiversity, Conservation and Attractions

Lawley River National Park is a national park in the Kimberley region of Western Australia, in the Shire of Wyndham–East Kimberley. The national park is located on the coast of the Admiralty Gulf but has no access roads. It is situated in the Northern Kimberley bioregion.

The Lawley River National Park was created on 10 July 2000 with a size of 17,572 hectares (43,420 acres).

In 2015, there was a proposal to merge the Prince Regent National Park, Mitchell River National Park and the Lawley River National Park to form a new Kimberley National Park, with a size of 5,000,000 hectares (12,000,000 acres) after mining leases in the area had expired.
