= Katers Island =

Island in Western Australia

Katers
- Location within Western Australia

Geography
- Coordinates: 14.4637°S 125.5336°E
- Total islands: 1
- Area: 1,718 ha (4,250 acres)
- Highest elevation: 101 m (331 ft)

Administration
- Australia

Demographics
- Population: 0

Katers Island is an uninhabited island located in the Kimberley region of Western Australia.

The island encompasses an area of 1,718 hectares (4,245 acres). Found approximately 1.4 kilometres (1 mi) off-shore the island has a maximum elevation of 101 metres (331 ft) it is composed of scarp country with massive scree and deep joints.

A new species of Rock Wallaby, Petrogale burbidgei. was discovered on Katers and other islands in the archipelago in 1977.
