= Prince Regent (ship) =

Several vessels have been named Prince Regent for George IV, of England, who was Prince regent from 1811 to his accession to the throne in 1826:

- Prince Regent (1811 EIC ship) was launched at Blackwall in 1811. She made ten voyages for the British East India Company (EIC), between 1811 and 1834. She continued to sail to India after the end of the EIC's trading activities in 1833, but was broken up in 1838.
- Prince Regent (1811 Howdon Pans ship) was launched at Howdon Pans in 1811, the last vessel that the shipbuilding firm of Francis Hurry & Co. built. She spent almost all her career as a West Indiaman. New owners circa 1834 started trading with the Baltic. She was wrecked on 31 October 1836, forcing her crew to abandon her.
- Prince Regent (1811 Montreal ship) was launched at Montreal in 1811. She sailed to England and thereafter traded from England with the Mediterranean, but mostly across the Atlantic. She suffered maritime mishaps in 1815, 1817, 1825, and 1826. She finally stranded and was lost, though with no loss of life, in June 1839.
- Prince Regent (1811 Rochester ship) was launched at Rochester in 1811. She initially traded with the West Indies and the Mediterranean. From 1814 on she started trading with the Indian Ocean and India, sailing under a licence from the British East India Company (EIC). In 1820–1821 she transported convicts from Ireland to New South Wales. She continued to trade with Australia. In 1841–1842 she made a second voyage transporting convicts from Ireland, this time to Hobart. In about 1843 new owners shifted her home port to Hull. From there she traded with Quebec, the Baltic, Aden, and perhaps elsewhere. In 1863 she was at Alicante, Spain where she grounded. She was condemned as not worth repairing.
- Prince Regent (1811 Shields ship) was launched at Shields in 1811. During her relatively long career she made four voyages transporting convicts to Australia, three voyages to New South Wales and one to Van Diemen's Land (Tasmania). After the first, rather than immediately returning to England, she engaged in whaling. Prince Regent spent many years as a transport, carrying troops for the British government. She was last listed in 1855.
- Prince Regent (1812 Whitehaven ship) was launched at Whitehaven in 1812. She initially sailed as a West Indiaman. Then from 1817 she made one voyage to India, sailing under a licence from the British East India Company (EIC). Afterwards, she traded across the Atlantic, primarily to the United States. She was last listed in 1839.
- Prince Regent (1812 schooner) was a 16-gun schooner launched in 1812 for Canada's Provincial Marine. Commissioned into the Royal Navy and renamed Beresford (or Lord Beresford) in 1813, re-rigged again as a brig and renamed HMS Netley in 1814 when the Royal Navy reorganised the detachment Admiralty policy being not to name vessels after living people. The vessel was broken up in the 1830s.
- Prince Regent (1817 ship) was launched in New Brunswick in 1817. She sailed to England and changed her registry, but then unusually, in 1821, her ownership and registry returned to New Brunswick. She was wrecked on the coast of Maine in November 1823.
- Prince Regent (1821 packet) was launched at Falmouth, Cornwall in 1821 as a Post Office Packet Service packet. The Royal Navy purchased her in 1826 when it took over the packet service, and renamed her HMS Cynthia. She was wrecked off Barbados on 6 June 1827.
- Prince Regent (1822 ship) was launched at Dunkirk in 1810 under another name. She may have been taken in prize. She first appeared Lloyd's Register (LR) as Prince Regent in 1822. She made one voyage to the British southern whale fishery. She essentially disappears from online records after her return to England circa 1826.

== See also ==
- HMS Prince Regent – One of three vessels of the Royal Navy
