= Boongaree Island =

Island in Kimberley region of Western Australia

Coordinates: 15°04′39″S 125°11′13″E

Location of Boongaree Island

Boongaree Island is located off the Kimberley coast of Western Australia.

The island is located in the southern end of the Bonaparte Archipelago in the north western part of Prince Frederick Harbour at the southern end of York Sound. It is one of a number of islands lying in the harbour.

The island encompasses an area of 4,215 hectares (10,415 acres).

The traditional owners of the area are the Uunguu peoples of the Wunambal language group, whose name for the island is Wunundarra or Bunjinii.

The area was surveyed in 1820 by Philip Parker King aboard HMS Mermaid. King named the island after the Indigenous Australian man, Boongaree, who was travelling aboard the vessel.

Fauna found on the island include the monjon, the northern quoll, the scaly-tailed possum and the northern leaf-nosed bat.
