= Prince Frederick Harbour =

Harbour in the Kimberley region of Western Australia

Coordinates: 14°54′47″S 125°5′26″E

Prince Frederick Harbour lies at the southern end of the York Sound, in the Kimberley region of Western Australia, opening into the Indian Ocean.

The Hunter and the Roe Rivers both discharge directly into the harbour.

The area was surveyed in 1820 by Philip Parker King aboard Mermaid.

Boongaree Island, also known as Boogarre Island, is found on the north western part of the harbour and is one of a number of islands lying in the harbour.
