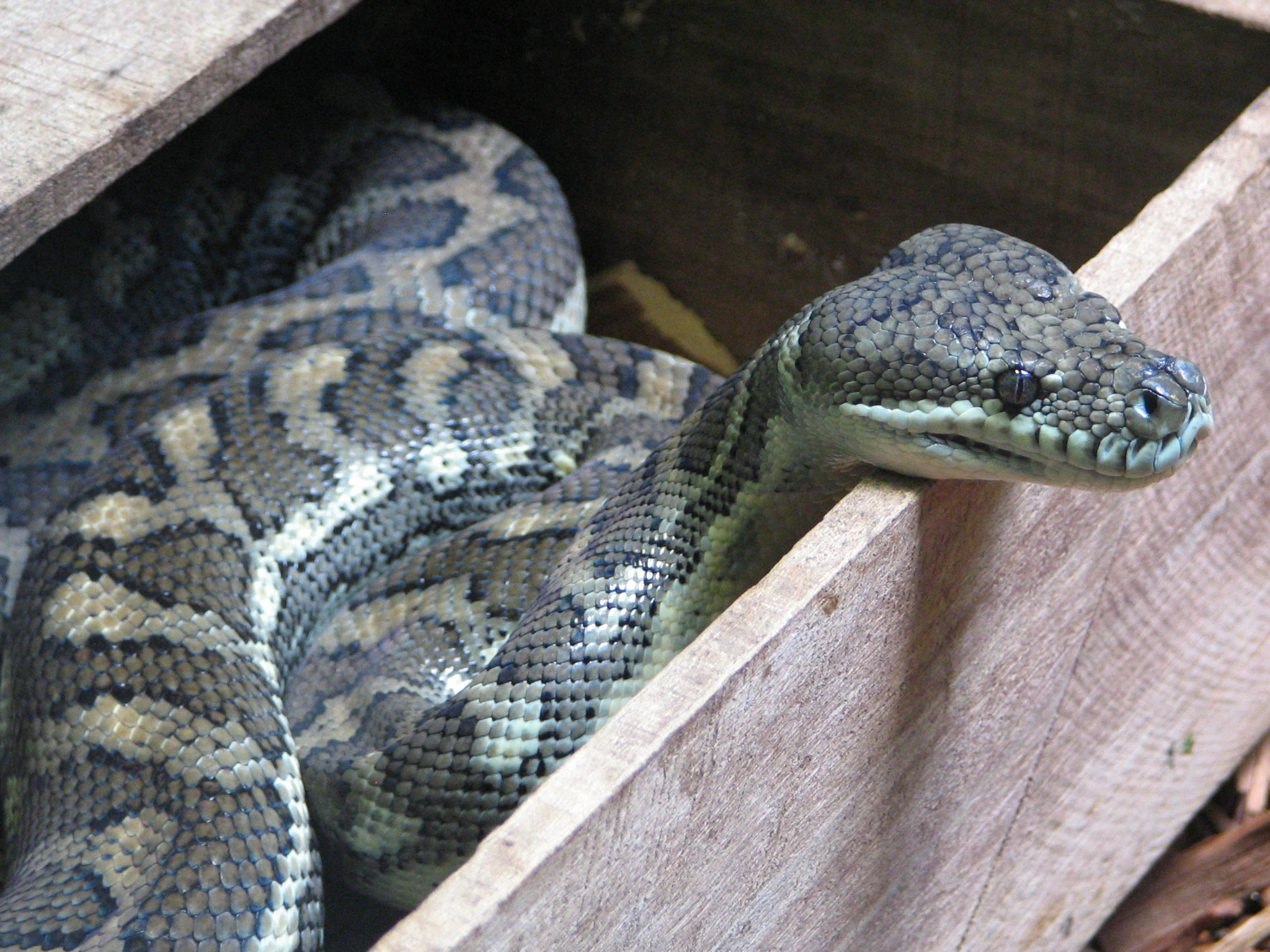
- Morelia spilota

Scientific classification
- Kingdom: Animalia
- Phylum: Chordata
- Class: Reptilia
- Order: Squamata
- Suborder: Serpentes
- Family: Pythonidae
- Subfamily: Pythoninae
- Genus: Morelia; Gray, 1842

Synonyms
- Morelia Gray, 1842; Simalia Gray, 1849; Chondropython Meyer, 1874; Aspidopython Meyer, 1874; Hypaspistes Ogilby, 1919; Australiasis Wells & Wellington, 1984; Nyctophylopython Wells & Wellington, 1984; Montypythonoides M.J. Smith & Plane, 1985

= Morelia (snake) =

Genus of large snakes

Morelia is a genus of large snakes in the family Pythonidae. The genus is native to Australia, Indonesia, and New Guinea. As of 2024, up to eight species are recognized.

Snakes in the genus Morelia are generally arboreal to semiarboreal, spending much of their lives in the forest canopy. Although exceptions occur, most may attain an adult total length (including tail) of 2–3 m (6.6–9.8 ft).

== Geographic range ==
Morelia species are found from Indonesia in the Maluku Islands, east through New Guinea, including the Bismarck Archipelago, and in Australia.

== Species ==
The following seven species are recognized as being valid.

Species
IUCN Status
Taxon author
Subsp.*
Common name
Geographic range
M. azurea

(Meyer, 1874)
2
Green tree python; northern green tree python
Papua New Guinea (Biak, Numfor and Supiori in the Schouten Islands group of Cenderawasih Bay)
M. bredli

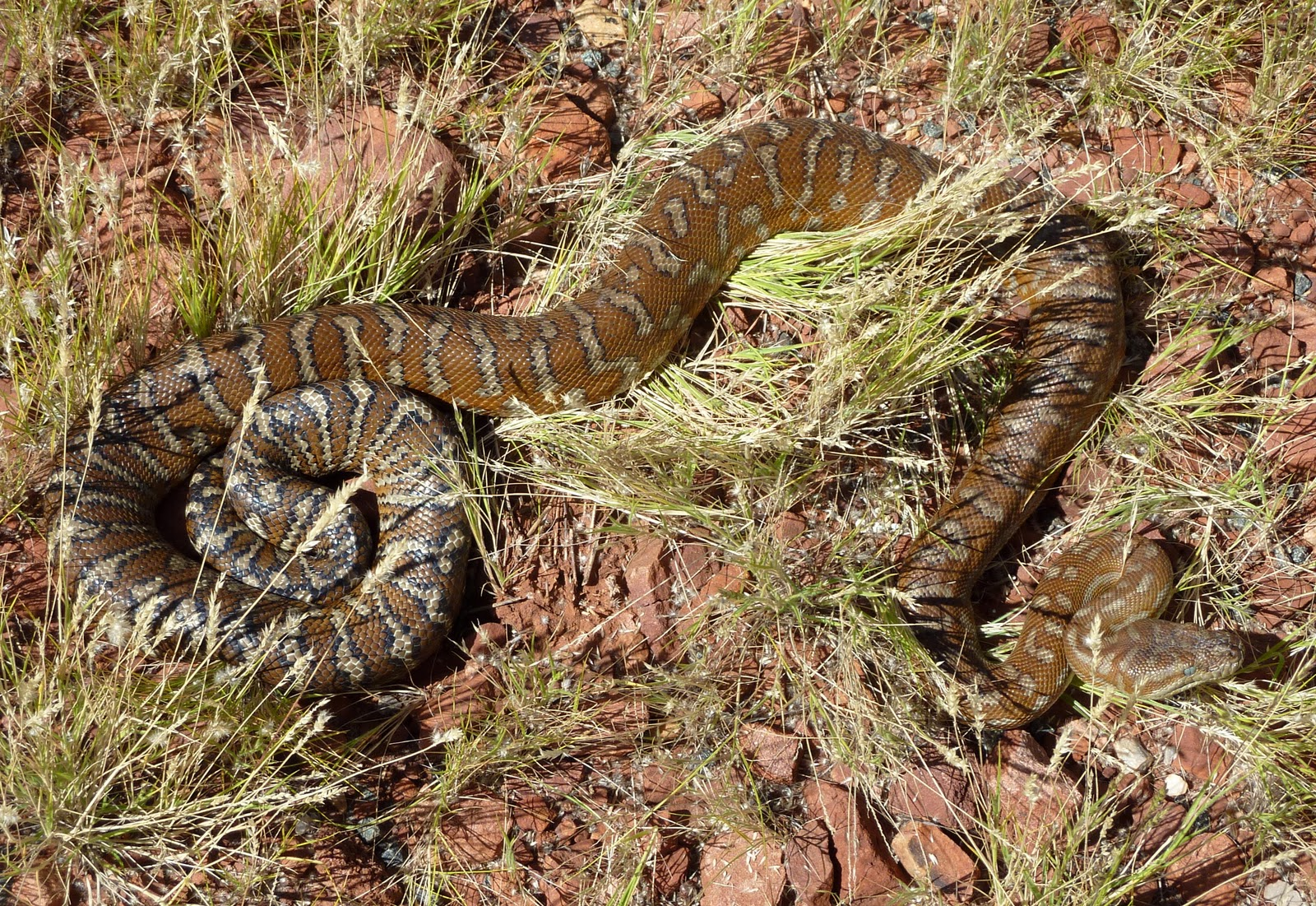

(Gow, 1981)
0
Bredl's python; Centralian python
Australia, in the mountains of the southern Northern Territory
M. carinata

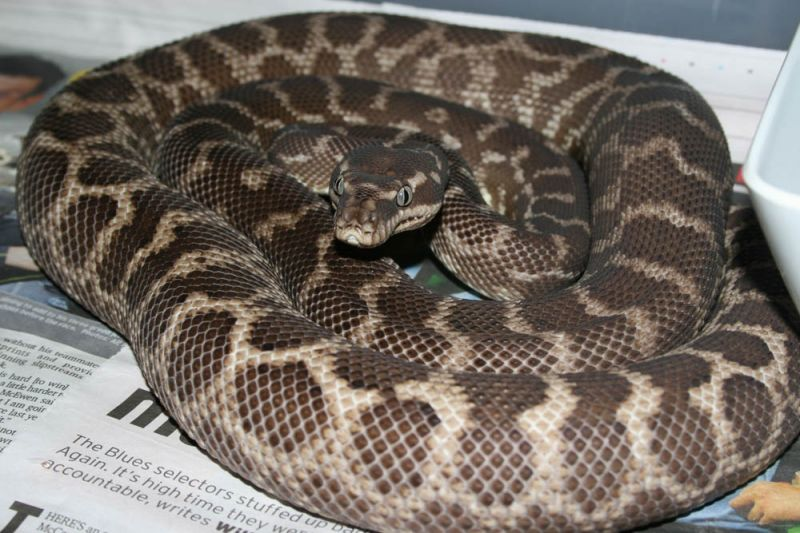

(L.A. Smith, 1981)
0
Rough-scaled python
Australia, northwestern Western Australia in the lower sections of the Mitchell and Hunter Rivers, just inland from the coast
M. imbricata

 

(L.A. Smith, 1981)
0
Southwestern carpet python
New Guinea, Australia (New South Wales, the Northern Territory, Queensland, South Australia, Victoria, Western Australia)
M. spilota^{T}

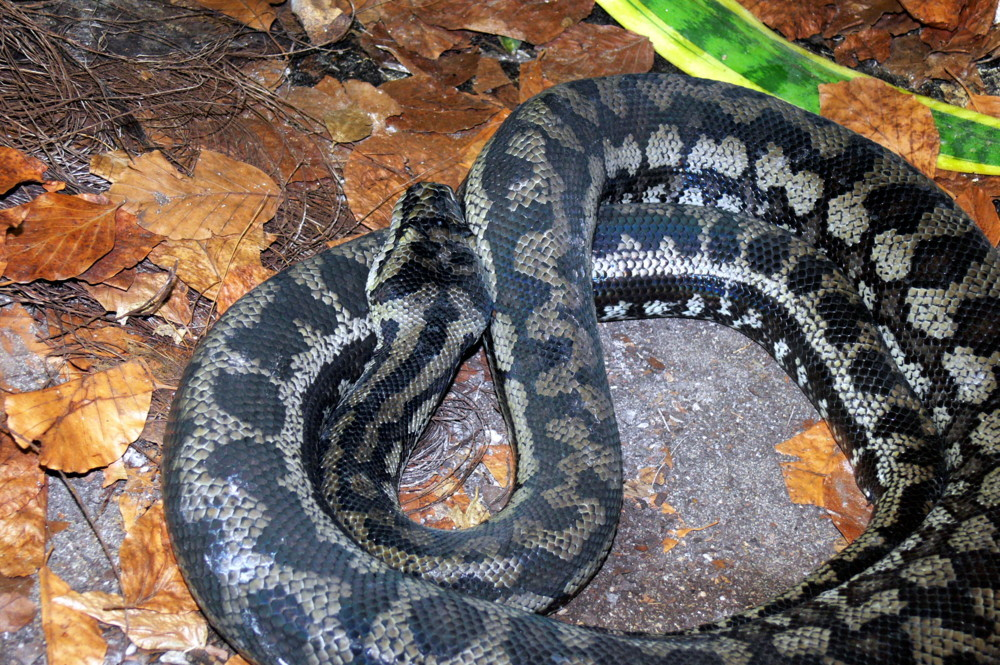

LC
NT
(Lacépède, 1804)
5
Carpet python; diamond python
Indonesia (southern Western New Guinea in Merauke Regency), Papua New Guinea (the southern Western Province, the Port Moresby area of Central Province and on Yule Island) and Australia (excluding much of the center and northwest of the country)
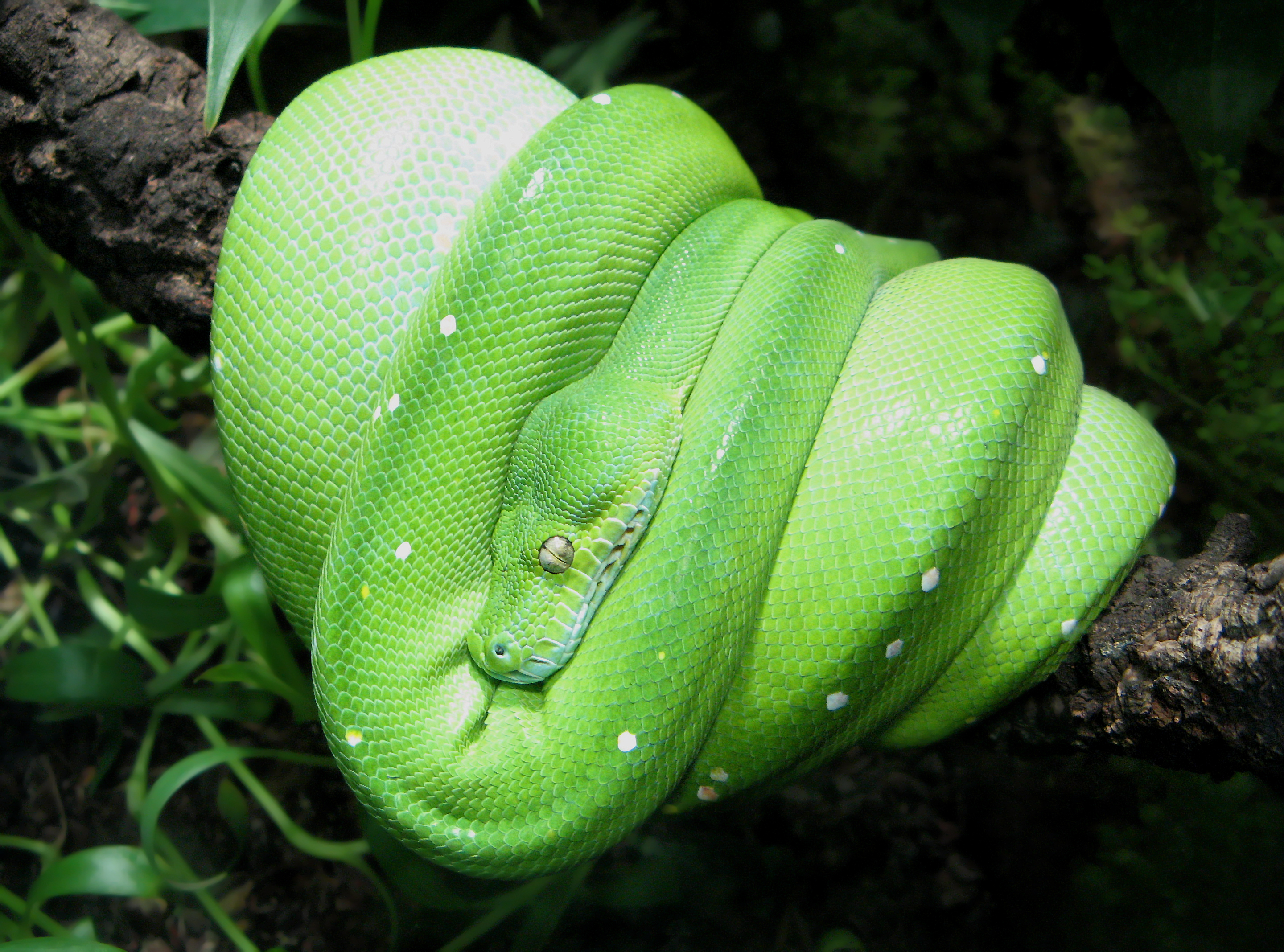
M. viridis
LC
(Schlegel, 1872)
0
Green tree python; southern green tree python
Indo/Papuan: Indonesia (Misool, Salawati, the Aru Islands, the Schouten Islands, most of Western New Guinea), Papua New Guinea (including nearby islands from sea level to 1,800 m elevation, Normanby Island and the d'Entrecasteaux Islands)

Australian: Queensland along the eastern coast of the Cape York Peninsula

M. riversleighensis†

(M.J. Smith & Plane, 1985)
0
n/a
Extinct, remains found in Queensland, Australia

- ) Not including the nominate subspecies.

^{T}) Type species.

=== Hybrids ===
- Morelia spilota X viridis
