= Roe River (Western Australia) =

River in Kimberley region of Western Australia

Coordinates: 15°08′16″S 125°23′11″E

Location
- Country: Australia

Physical characteristics
- Source
  - location: Princess May Ranges
  - elevation: 274 metres (899 ft)
- Mouth
  - location: York Sound
  - elevation: sea level
- Length: 66 km (41 mi)
- Basin size: 3,278 km^{2} (1,266 sq mi)

The Roe River is a river in the Kimberley region of Western Australia.

The headwaters of the river lie in the Princess May Ranges within the Prince Regent National Park flowing in a north westerly direction, discharging into Prince Frederick Harbour in York Sound, and then to the Indian Ocean. The river contains several permanent pools, including Paradise Pool where many examples of ancient indigenous art known as Bradshaw paintings are found along the cliff faces. Bradshaw paintings are dated at a minimum of 17,000 years before the present.

Tributaries include the Moran River, Garimbu Creek, Wyulda Creek, Rufous Creek and Gandjal Creek.

The river was named in 1820 by Philip Parker King after the father of master's mate John Septimus Roe during his voyage in Mermaid; he also named Prince Frederick Harbour, Prince Regent River and the nearby Mount Trafalgar during the same visit.

The first European to trace the Roe from its source to its outflow in Prince Frederick Harbour was government surveyor Frederick Slade Drake-Brockman in 1901.
