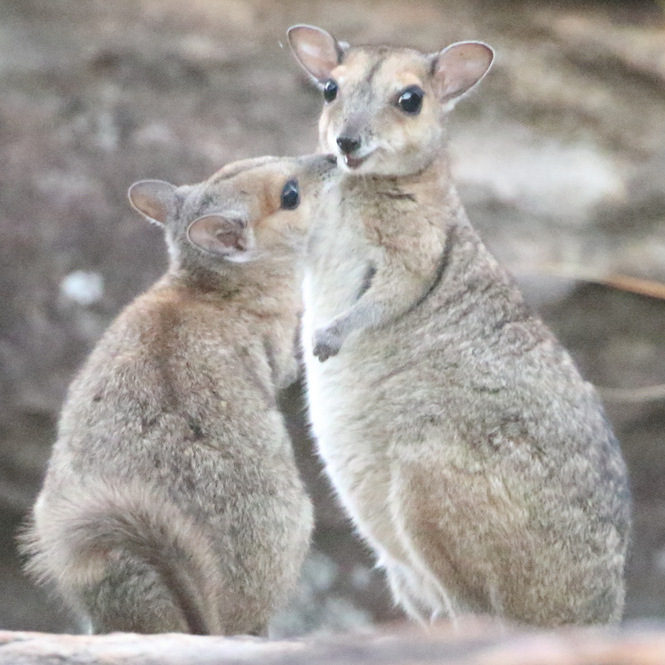

Conservation status
- Near Threatened (IUCN 3.1)

Scientific classification
- Kingdom: Animalia
- Phylum: Chordata
- Class: Mammalia
- Infraclass: Marsupialia
- Order: Diprotodontia
- Family: Macropodidae
- Genus: Petrogale
- Species: P. burbidgei

Binomial name
- Petrogale burbidgei Kitchener & Sanson, 1978.
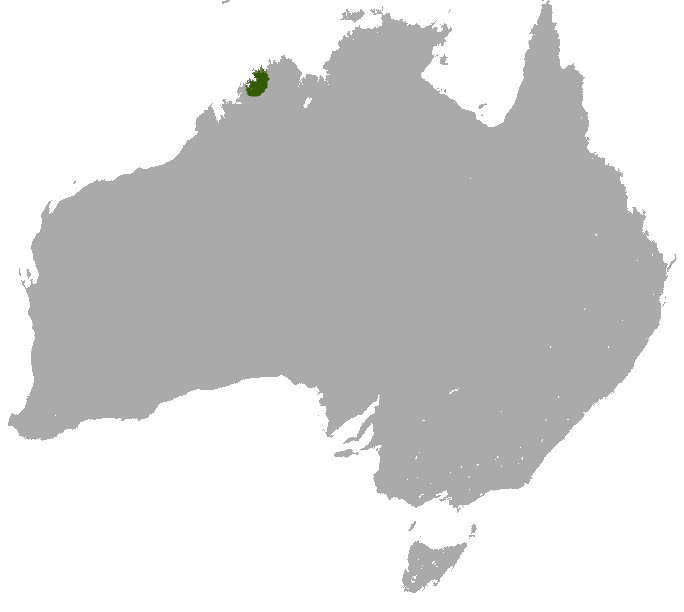
- Monjon range

= Monjon =

Species of marsupial

The monjon (Petrogale burbidgei) is the smallest species of rock-wallaby (Petrogale) in the family Macropodidae, found in northwestern Australia. They are restricted to a small area of the Kimberley in the state of Western Australia, and on nearby islands within the Bonaparte Archipelago. Common names also include Burbidge's rock-wallaby and Burbidge's rock-weasel.

== Taxonomy ==
The monjon is a small species of macropod (terrestrial kangaroos, wallabies, wallaroos, etc) placed in the genus Petrogale (the rock-wallabies). The first published description of the species was in 1978, based on specimens collected and reviewed by D. J. Kitchener and G. Sanson. The type specimen is a female that weighed 1,400 g (49 oz), shot by Kitchener in a sandstone crevice on an evening in November 1976 at the Mitchell Plateau, near to a site named Crystal Creek. That animal was carrying a hairless joey (baby) in its pouch at the time that it was killed, which weighed around 50 g (1.8 oz). Other specimens were obtained at the Mitchell Plateau, as well as from Boongaree, Katers and Bigge Islands (of the Bonaparte Archipelago) and within Prince Regent National Park. The specific epithet was named for Andrew A. Burbidge, who was credited with prompting surveys of mammals of the Kimberley region.

Burbidge later wrote a paper on the selection of the vernacular for the species. One author of the first description, Kitchener, published the suggested vernacular as warabi, a term he was informed was the animal's name in the Wunumbal language, and this was subsequently adopted by the Australian Mammal Society and used by the editor Ronald Strahan for the mammalian volume of the National Photographic Index of Australian Wildlife (1983). In later consultations with the local people several synonyms were identified by Burbidge; whilst those familiar with the animals could readily identify the separate taxa, these names refer to both Petrogale concinna and to this species. This reexamination was instigated by the learnt information that warabi referred to a matter unrelated to the animal. From these synonyms the name 'monjon' was proposed and accepted to replace the earlier vernacular.

== Description ==
The smallest species of the genus, the length of the head and body combined is 300 to 350 millimetres (12 to 14 in) and they weigh a relatively light 950 to 1,400 grams (34 to 49 oz). The hind foot is 80 to 92 mm (3.1 to 3.6 in) long. The tail is 265 to 390 mm (10.4 to 15.4 in), a tawny colour with back flecking, and distinguished by dark-brown tufted hair that begins two thirds along its length. The ears are 30 to 33 mm (1.2 to 1.3 in) from base to tip, very short for the genus; the eyes are large and black. The upper side of the pelage is an olive-buff colour, deep in tone and marbled in appearance. The fore part of the head is a deeper reddish brown, becoming paler at the cheek, and a similar colour is found across the upper limb. The ventral side, up to the chin, is pale to whitish and may have a yellowish tone at the belly.

P. burbidgei are shy. They are mostly active during the night and able to relocate with quick and adept movements.

== Distribution and habitat ==
The distribution range is restricted to high rainfall locations, with 1,200 to 1,400 mm (47 to 55 in) of precipitation annually, at the coast and islands of the Kimberley region. The population occurs commonly at the few known locations, including the islands Bigge, Boongaree and Katers, where the first specimens were obtained in the 1970s. They are associated with habitat occurring on Wunaamin Miliwundi sandstone formations; the vegetation is open woodland of eucalypts and Owenia vernicosa.

The species is present in the Charnley River–Artesian Range Wildlife Sanctuary in the Kimberley region of Western Australia.

== Ecology ==
The species retires to caves or other cavities amongst the sandstone. The diet is primarily composed of grasses and ferns. The breeding period is assumed to be year-round, with most births occurring during the northern wet season. Petrogale burbidgei is listed as near threatened, partly because of the small size of its known range.
