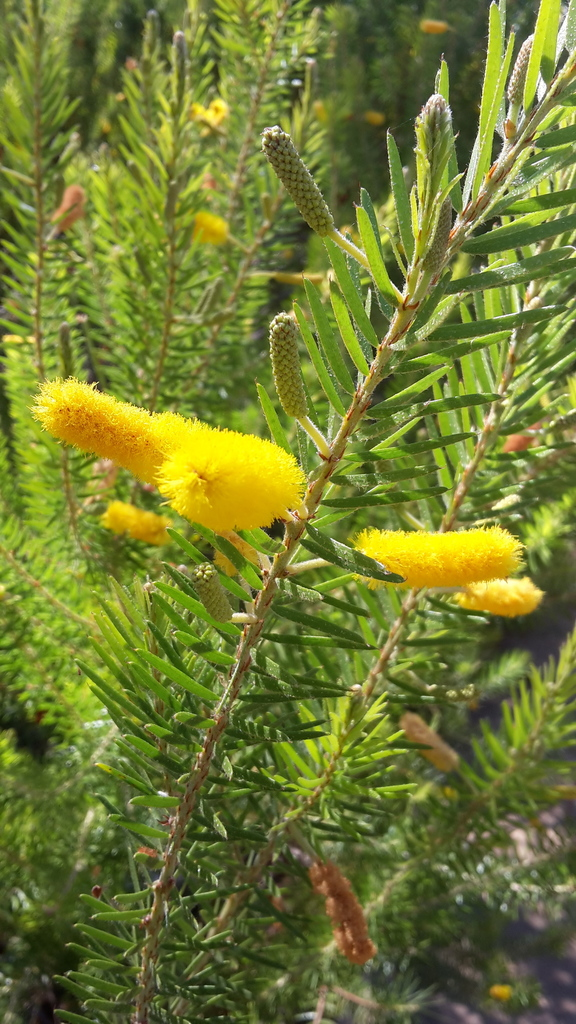
- Near Derby

Scientific classification
- Kingdom: Plantae
- Clade: Embryophytes
- Clade: Tracheophytes
- Clade: Angiosperms
- Clade: Eudicots
- Clade: Rosids
- Order: Fabales
- Family: Fabaceae
- Subfamily: Caesalpinioideae
- Clade: Mimosoid clade
- Genus: Acacia
- Species: A. kelleri

Binomial name
- Acacia kelleri F.Muell.
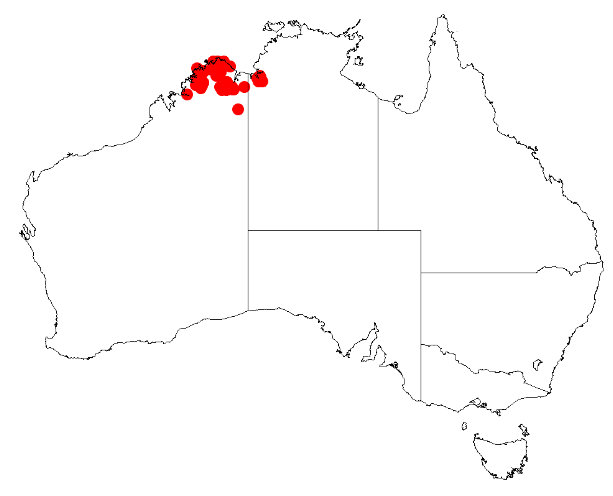
- Occurrence data from AVH

Synonyms
- Racosperma kelleri (F.Muell.) Pedley

= Acacia kelleri =

Species of legume

Acacia kelleri is a species of flowering plant in the family Fabaceae and is endemic to a small area in the north-west of Australia. It is a shrub or tree with linear or very narrowly lance-shaped phyllodes, spikes of dense, deep yellow flowers and leathery, glabrous pods, appearing somewhat like a string of beads.

== Description ==
Acacia kelleri is a shrub or tree that typically grows to a height of up to 7 m (23 ft) with fissured grey bark, weeping branches and terete, light brown branchlets covered with soft hairs. Its phyllodes are crowded, erect, linear or very narrowly lance-shaped, 10–25 mm (0.39–0.98 in) long, 0.7–2.5 mm (0.028–0.098 in) wide and straight or slightly curved. There is a slightly off-centre midvein and a gland 2–4 mm (0.079–0.157 in) above the pulvinus. The flowers are borne in spikes 13–45 mm (0.51–1.77 in) long with dense, deep yellow flowers. Flowering occurs from March to August, and the pods are more or less terete, up to about 110 mm (4.3 in) long, 3–5 mm (0.12–0.20 in) wide, glabrous and leathery, appearing somewhat like a string of beads. The seeds are 4.5–6 mm (0.18–0.24 in) long, shiny dark brown to black with an aril on the end.

== Taxonomy ==
Acacia kelleri was first formally described in 1892 by the Ferdinand von Mueller in Proceedings of the Linnean Society of New South Wales from specimens collected near the Durack River by Joseph Bradshaw. The specific epithet (kelleri) honours Heinrich Keller (1826–1890) of Darmstadt, "one of the leading promoters or rural culture during the latter half of this century through many parts of the world". After its discovery, several specimens of the plant were sent by the director of the botanical garden in Melbourne to its namesake in Darmstadt in 1892.

== Distribution and habitat ==
This wattle is usually associated with sandstone, often on escarpments or ridges in the Central Kimberley, Northern Kimberley and Victoria Bonaparte bioregions of north-western of Western Australia and in a small area west of the Victoria River in the far north-west of the Northern Territory.

== Conservation status ==
Acacia kelleri is listed as 'not threatened' by the Government of Western Australia Department of Parks and Wildlife, but as 'near threatened' under the Northern Territory Government Territory Parks and Wildlife Conservation Act.

== See also ==
- List of Acacia species
