= Grevillea cunninghamii =

Conservation status
- Least Concern (IUCN 3.1)

Scientific classification
- Kingdom: Plantae
- Clade: Embryophytes
- Clade: Tracheophytes
- Clade: Spermatophytes
- Clade: Angiosperms
- Clade: Eudicots
- Order: Proteales
- Family: Proteaceae
- Genus: Grevillea
- Species: G. cunninghamii

Binomial name
- Grevillea cunninghamii R.Br.

Synonyms
- Grevillea carduifolia Benth.

Species of shrub endemic to Western Australia

Grevillea cunninghamii is a species of flowering plant in the family Proteaceae and is endemic to the north of Western Australia. It is a shrub with egg-shaped leaves with sharply-pointed teeth on the edges, and clusters of red flowers.

== Description ==
Grevillea cunninghamii is a prickly shrub that typically grows to a height of 1.2–4 m (3 ft 11 in – 13 ft 1 in), its branchlets and leaves glabrous. The adult leaves are egg-shaped, 40–90 mm (1.6–3.5 in) long and 30–55 mm (1.2–2.2 in) wide with 13 to 21 spine-like, sharply-pointed teeth on the edges. The flowers are arranged in loose, more or less spherical clusters on a rachis 2–6 mm (0.079–0.236 in) long, the pistil 8.0–9.5 mm (0.31–0.37 in) long. The flowers are red and pale red to yellow with a red style. Flowering mostly occurs from May to September and the fruit is an oblong follicle 9.0–10.5 mm (0.35–0.41 in) long.

== Taxonomy ==
Grevillea cunninghamii was first formally described in 1830 by Robert Brown in the Supplementum primum prodromi florae Novae Hollandiae from specimens collected by Allan Cunningham in 1820. The specific epithet (cunninghamii) honours the collector of the type specimens.

== Distribution and habitat ==
Grevillea cunninghamii usually grows in open scrub communities in near-coastal regions and off-shore islands between Cape Londonderry and King Sound in the Dampierland, Northern Kimberley and Victoria Bonaparte biogeographic regions of northern Western Australia.

== Conservation status ==
This grevillea is listed as least concern on the IUCN Red List of Threatened Species and as not threatened by the Department of Biodiversity, Conservation and Attractions.
