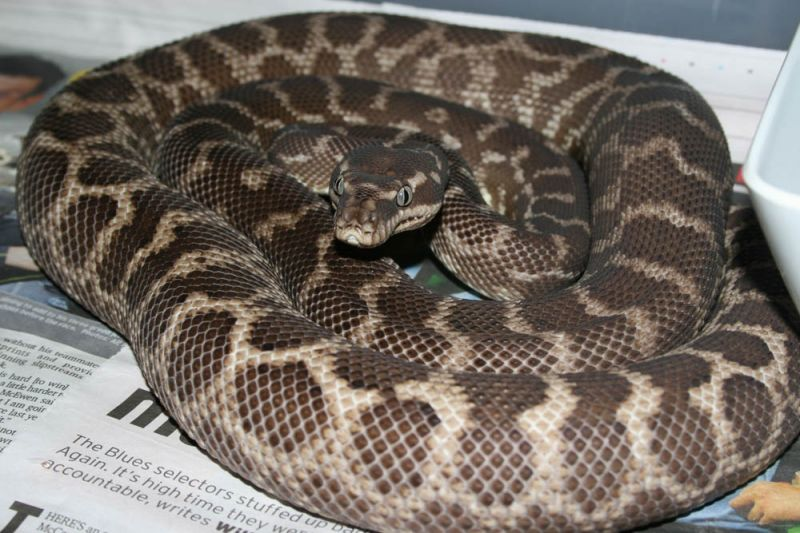
- Rough-scaled python pictured in captivity.

Conservation status
- Least Concern (IUCN 3.1)

Scientific classification
- Kingdom: Animalia
- Phylum: Chordata
- Class: Reptilia
- Order: Squamata
- Suborder: Serpentes
- Family: Pythonidae
- Genus: Morelia
- Species: M. carinata

Binomial name
- Morelia carinata (L.A. Smith, 1981)

Synonyms
- Python carinatus L.A. Smith, 1981; Morelia carinata – H.G. Cogger, Cameron & H.M. Cogger, 1983

= Rough-scaled python =

Species of snake

The rough-scaled python (Morelia carinata) is a large-scaled python species endemic to Australia. No subspecies are currently recognized.

== Description ==
The rough-scaled python is able to grow to around 2 m (6.6 ft) in total length. It has a triangular-shaped head with a conspicuous constriction at the neck area. M. carinata is distinguished by the presence of a large parietal scale and by having distinct keeled dorsal scales. The body is slim and muscular. The color pattern is light honey-tan with darker reddish-brown markings or dark brown with pale brown blotches. The blotches become larger toward the tail, so the pattern appears to be reversed. The belly is white, possibly with black spots. The markings are thought to assist in providing camouflage. The wrinkled to corrugated scales also assist the snake in climbing up sandstone and crevices.

The species was first formally identified by biologist L.A. Smith in 1981 as part of the work A revision of the python genera Aspidites and Python (Serpentes: Boidae) in Western Australia as published in the Records of the Western Australian Museum.

== Captivity ==
They are now available to private owners, originating from a few wild-caught specimens, as they were found to breed readily in captivity.

Three males and two females were collected and transferred to the Australian Reptile Park in 2000 and had produced 71 offspring by 2012. These, in turn, had produced another offspring.

== Distribution and habitat ==
These snakes are found in Australia, in northwestern Western Australia in the lower sections of the Mitchell and Hunter Rivers, just inland from the coast. The type locality given is "Mitchell River Falls, Western Australia (14°50'S, 125°42'E)" [Australia].

They are found in rocky valleys of Kimberley region in far northern Western Australia, where they climb on low trees and shrubs of monsoon rainforest. The species has one of the smallest distributions of any snake. They are present in the Charnley River–Artesian Range Wildlife Sanctuary in the Kimberley region.

The species is often associated with fruit-bearing trees, possibly indicating a preference of ambush sites for herbivorous animals, and also close to permanent fresh water.

== Behavior ==
So far, they are reported to be strictly crepuscular. Their temperament is quite docile with rarely any attempts to bite.

== Reproduction ==
This species is confirmed to be an egg-layer (oviparous) like other pythons. The mating season is between July and August, after which the female will typically find a vacant mammal or reptile burrow (or an otherwise dark, secluded location) to occupy for a number of weeks, effectively converting the space into a nursery. Females usually lay around ten semi-soft, leathery, oval-shaped eggs, which they then incubate with their body heat for several weeks, abstaining from all food or water, not wishing to deprive any essential warmth to the developing eggs until they hatch. Once the eggs do begin cracking, and the young pythons finally take their first breaths of air, the likely starving and parched mother leaves her offspring in-search of nourishment, never to return. She does not take care of the babies, which are instead born with a hunter's instinct. The snakelets begin their lives by hunting larger insects, such as beetles or large crickets, before gradually moving-on to mammalian prey.

== Media ==
This species was only filmed for the first time by wildlife conservationist Malcolm Douglas, and shown on his Kimberley Adventure Part 1. (1997)
