= Mitchell River National Park (Western Australia) =

National park in Western Australia

- IUCN category II (national park)
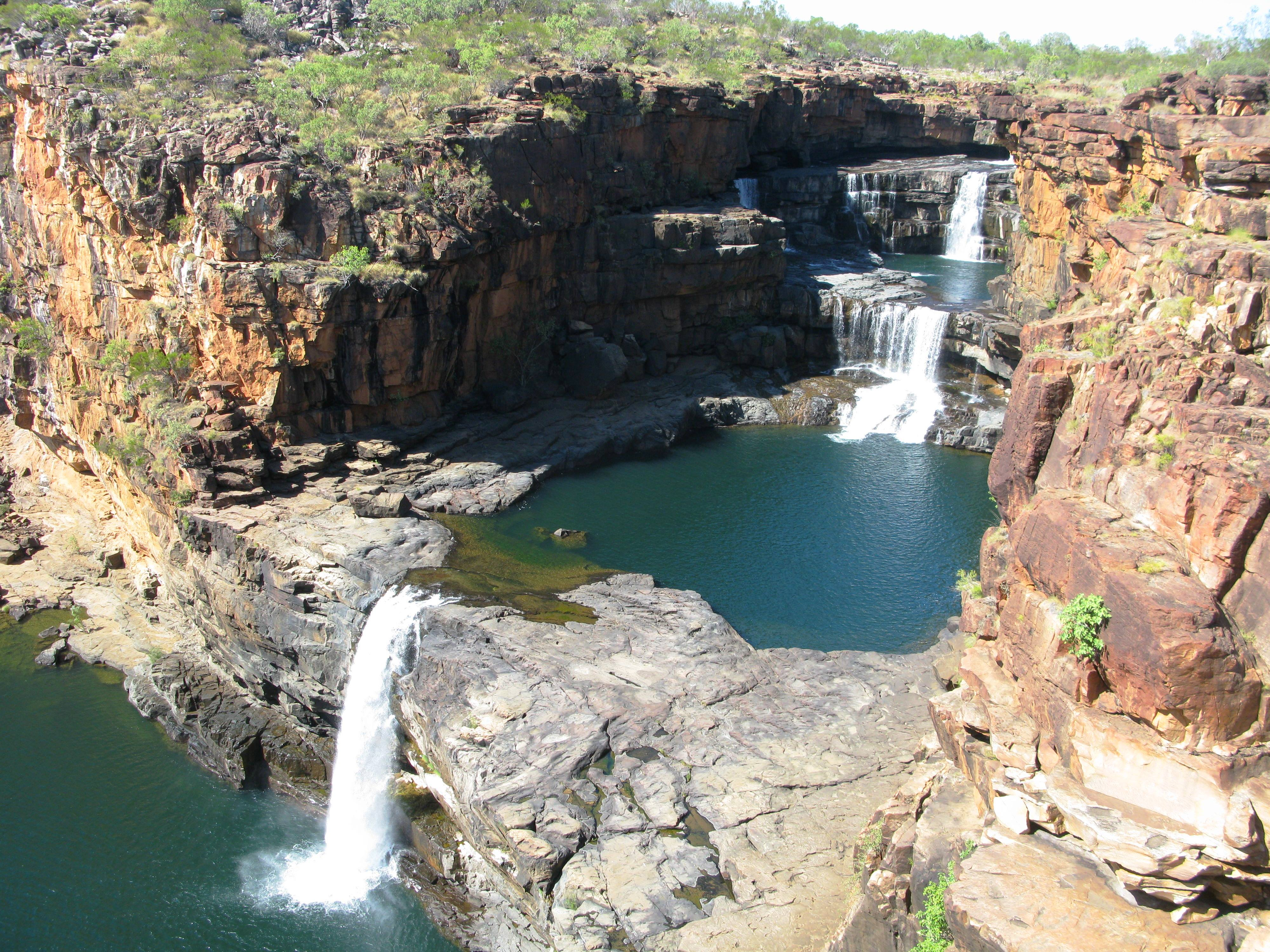
- Mitchell Falls

- Location within Western Australia
- Location: Western Australia
- Nearest city: Wyndham
- Coordinates: 14°48′24″S 125°42′29″E
- Area: 1,153.25 km^{2} (445.27 sq mi)
- Established: 2000
- Governing body: Department of Parks and Wildlife
- Website: Official website

Mitchell River National Park is a national park in the Kimberley region of Western Australia, 2,140 kilometres (1,330 mi) northeast of Perth. The park adjoins the northern boundary of the Prince Regent National Park. The nearest towns are Derby, 350 kilometres (217 mi) to the southwest, as well as Wyndham, 270 km (168 mi) to the southeast. Created in 2000, the park covers an area of over 1,150 km^{2} (440 sq mi) on the Mitchell Plateau (Ngauwudu).

The two main features of the park are Mitchell Falls (a waterfall on the Mitchell River) and Surveyors Pool (or Aunauyu). It lies in the traditional lands of the Wunambal, an Aboriginal Australian people. The park is known for distinctive plants such as a species of fan palm; it is home to several significant and threatened species, including the tiny rock wallaby known as the monjon and the black grasswren.

A new Kimberley National Park, which would encompass Mitchell River National Park, Prince Regent National Park and Lawley River National Park, was in the early stages of planning around 2015 by Colin Barnett's government, when permits to mine bauxite on the plateau were terminated, but since then (as of November 2020) these plans have not been furthered.

== History ==
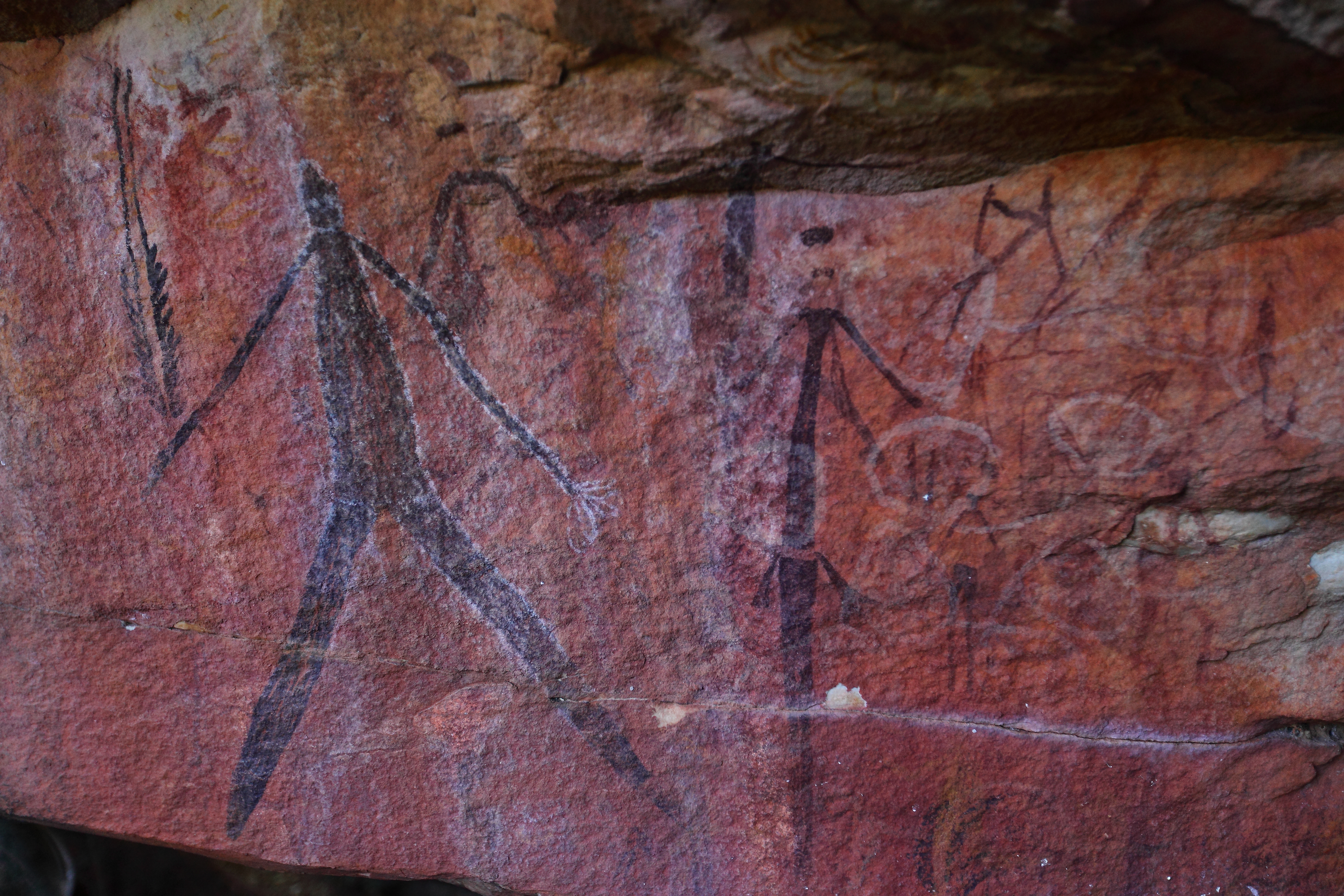
Rock art in Mitchell River National Park

The plateau's wildlife has remained unchanged for close to 50,000 years.

Ngauwudu is the Wunambal people's name for the Mitchell Plateau. Wunambal people have lived in the area for many thousands of years, practising their culture based on Wandjina (to whom they refer as Gulingi) and Wunggurr lore and law. The Wunambal form part of a cultural bloc of Aboriginal peoples known as Wanjina Wunggurr.

European explorers reached the region in 1921, led by surveyor William Easton, who named the Mitchell River after then Premier of Western Australia, James Mitchell.

In 1965 a mining company called Amax Bauxite set up a camp on the plateau.

The park was formed in 2000 without the consent of the traditional owners or following proper procedure under the Native Title Act 1993.

As of 2020 the park encompasses over 1,150 km^{2} (440 sq mi) of the Mitchell Plateau.

== Management and future plans ==
The park area falls into the Uunguu (Wunambal Gaambera) area of the Wanjina Wunggurr peoples. In May 2011, native title was eventually determined for the Wunambal Gaambera people, represented by the Wunambal Gaambera Aboriginal Corporation RNTBC. The first stage of the Uunguu Indigenous Protected Area (IPA) encompassing 343,700 hectares (849,000 acres) hectares was created at this time, with the second stage declared in 2015. The IPA covers 759,806 hectares (1,877,520 acres) as of 2020. The WGAC works in partnership with Bush Heritage Australia, a non-government organisation working to preserve the environment.

The Department of Parks and Wildlife manages the park jointly with the Wunambal Gaambera.

In March 2015, the Government of Western Australia agreed on a ban on mining with both Rio Tinto and Alcoa Australia, which would allow protection over an area of 1,750 km^{2} (680 sq mi). The government had started on negotiations with traditional owners with a view to creating a huge protected area which would lie next to the already-planned Great Kimberley Marine Park. A new huge Kimberley National Park had been planned (based on a 2013 election commitment) to cover more than 20,000 km^{2} (7,700 mi^{2}) and would include the Prince Regent National Park and the Lawley River National Park]. Rio Tinto committed to A$750,000 worth of spending on land rehabilitation where drilling had already occurred. However, as of 2020, with a change of government in 2017, the plan for the new park has not as yet advanced.

== Flora and fauna ==
The Mitchell Plateau, according to Pew Outback, "is the only part of mainland Australia where no native species extinctions have occurred".

The park is biologically significant and contains over 50 species of mammal, 220 birds and 86 amphibians and reptiles, including the saltwater crocodile, king brown snake and taipan.

There are mangroves, swamps, woodlands as well as patches of tropical rainforest. A species of Livistona palm endemic to the north Kimberley, Livistona eastonii, may grow up to 18 metres (59 ft) and some are as old as 280 years.

The monjon (a small rock wallaby) and the rough-scaled python live in sandstone areas of the plateau. Other important species include the dugong, flatback turtle, northern quoll, scaly-tailed possum, and the golden-backed tree rat.

The park is part of the Prince Regent and Mitchell River Important Bird Area, identified as such by BirdLife International because of its importance for a range of bird species, especially those restricted to tropical savanna habitats. It is home to the near threatened species, the black grasswren, which nests in sandstone crevices.

== Access ==
The Mitchell Plateau track, off the Kalumburu Road (172 km (107 mi) north of the Gibb River Road junction, is accessible by 4WD only. There is an airstrip.

== Climate ==
Mitchell River National Park has a tropical savanna climate (Aw) with warm temperatures present year round. The wet season typically runs from November through March and is very rainy. The following climate data is for Mitchell Plateau.

Climate data for Mitchell Plateau
Month	Jan	Feb	Mar	Apr	May	Jun	Jul	Aug	Sep	Oct	Nov	Dec	Year
Record high °C (°F)	40.9 (105.6)	38.1 (100.6)	37.3 (99.1)	40.0 (104.0)	37.3 (99.1)	33.5 (92.3)	34.7 (94.5)	37.3 (99.1)	39.4 (102.9)	40.5 (104.9)	42.3 (108.1)	39.7 (103.5)	42.3 (108.1)
Mean daily maximum °C (°F)	32.5 (90.5)	32.1 (89.8)	32.7 (90.9)	33.2 (91.8)	31.7 (89.1)	29.6 (85.3)	30.1 (86.2)	32.5 (90.5)	34.5 (94.1)	35.7 (96.3)	36.0 (96.8)	34.5 (94.1)	32.9 (91.3)
Daily mean °C (°F)	27.6 (81.7)	27.3 (81.1)	27.3 (81.1)	25.9 (78.6)	23.2 (73.8)	20.4 (68.7)	19.9 (67.8)	22.6 (72.7)	25.4 (77.7)	27.8 (82.0)	29.2 (84.6)	28.7 (83.7)	25.4 (77.8)
Mean daily minimum °C (°F)	22.8 (73.0)	22.6 (72.7)	21.9 (71.4)	18.6 (65.5)	14.8 (58.6)	11.2 (52.2)	9.7 (49.5)	12.7 (54.9)	16.4 (61.5)	20.0 (68.0)	22.4 (72.3)	23.0 (73.4)	18.0 (64.4)
Record low °C (°F)	17.9 (64.2)	18.4 (65.1)	16.5 (61.7)	9.4 (48.9)	5.2 (41.4)	1.5 (34.7)	1.7 (35.1)	4.2 (39.6)	7.5 (45.5)	9.0 (48.2)	15.6 (60.1)	18.2 (64.8)	1.5 (34.7)
Average rainfall mm (inches)	378.6 (14.91)	367.5 (14.47)	320.4 (12.61)	41.0 (1.61)	31.5 (1.24)	8.4 (0.33)	16.4 (0.65)	1.3 (0.05)	11.8 (0.46)	52.0 (2.05)	126.9 (5.00)	182.1 (7.17)	1,537.9 (60.55)
Average rainy days	19.6	19.6	17.8	5.4	2.2	0.7	0.6	0.3	1.7	4.7	10.3	13.9	96.8

== See also ==
- List of protected areas of Western Australia
- List of waterfalls
- List of waterfalls in Australia
