= York Sound =

Sound in Kimberley region of Western Australia

Coordinates: 14°54′47″S 125°5′26″E

York Sound is a sound located in the Kimberley region of Western Australia opening into the Indian Ocean. The sound is bounded by Cape Pond to the North and Hardey Point with the Coronation Islands to the South. The nearest populated town to the Sound is Kalumburu, 180 kilometres (112 mi) to the North East.

The main feature of the sound is Boongaree Island which is situated close to the mainland to the South and the Anderdon Islands and Murrara Island to the North. Prince Frederick Harbour is found at the southern end of the sound.

The Hunter and the Roe Rivers both discharge directly into the Sound.

The first European to visit the area was the Dutch sailor and explorer, Abel Tasman, who landed in the area in 1644. The area was surveyed in 1820 by Philip Parker King aboard the Mermaid.

During World War II a small group of Japanese officers landed in the area to determine rumours that large air & naval bases were being built. They became the only Axis soldiers to have landed in Australia during the war.
