= HMS Prince Regent =

Three ships of the Royal Navy have been named HMS Prince Regent, after numerous holders of the position of prince regent:

- HMS Prince Regent (1814) was a 56-gun fourth rate launched in 1814. She was renamed HMS Kingston later in 1814 and was sold in 1832.
- HMS Prince Regent (1820) was a yacht launched in 1820 and presented to Oman in 1836.
- HMS Prince Regent (1823) was a 120-gun first-rate ship of the line launched in 1823. She was converted to screw propulsion and rearmed to 78 guns in 1861 and was broken up in 1873.

In addition, a Canadian ship launched as Prince Regent in 1812 later acquired the HMS prefix under a different name:

- Prince Regent (1812 schooner) was a 16-gun schooner launched in 1812 for Canada's Provincial Marine. Commissioned into the Royal Navy and renamed Beresford (or Lord Beresford) in 1813, re-rigged again as a brig and renamed HMS Netley in 1814 when the Royal Navy reorganised the detachment Admiralty policy being not to name vessels after living people. The vessel was broken up in the 1830s.
