= Heywood Island (Western Australia) =

Island off the coast of Western Australia

Heywood Island (15°20′27″S 124°19′21″E) is located off the Kimberley coast of Western Australia.
