= Hunter River (Western Australia) =

River in Western Australia

Coordinates: 15°2′34″S 125°22′50″E

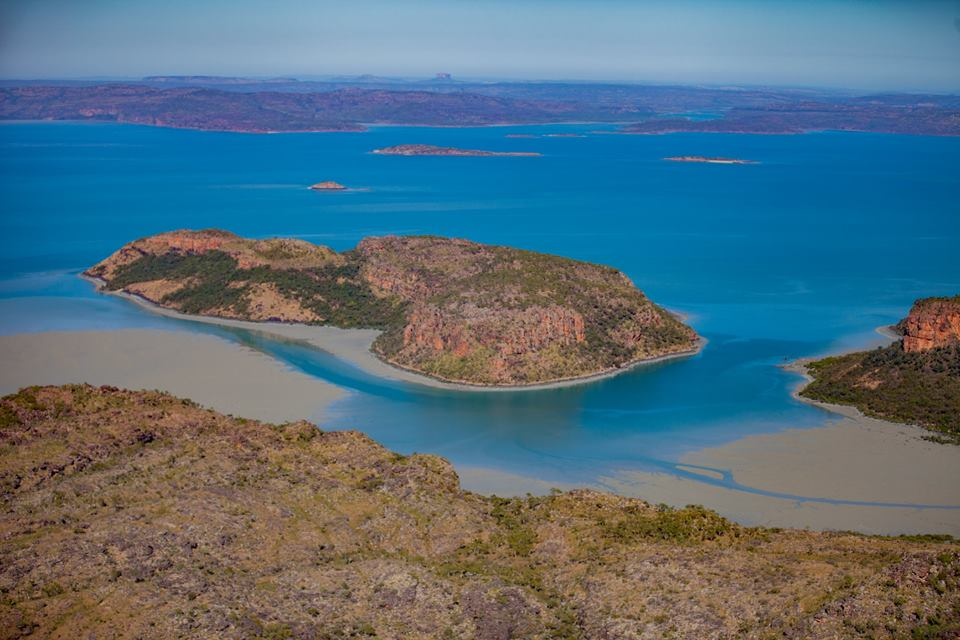

Location
- Country: Australia

Physical characteristics
- Source
  - location: Donkins Hll
  - elevation: 107 metres (351 ft)
- Mouth
  - location: York Sound
  - elevation: sea level
- Length: 16 km (9.9 mi)
- Basin size: 408 km^{2} (158 sq mi)

The Hunter River is a river in the Kimberley region of Western Australia.

The headwaters of the river rise below Donkins Hill. The river flows in a south-westerly direction until it discharges into Prince Frederick Harbour then York Sound and the Indian Ocean.

The river was named in 1820 by the explorer Philip Parker King aboard Mermaid while making charts in the area. The river was named after the surgeon on Mermaid, James Hunter.

The river has two spectacular waterfalls, the Hunter Falls and Donkin Falls, both of which drop 90 metres (295 ft). Moreover, a large and unusual rock formation is found at the mouth of the river. The area is popular with tourism companies and several wilderness cruises operate there.
