= Prince Regent National Park =

National park in Western Australia

- IUCN category II (national park)
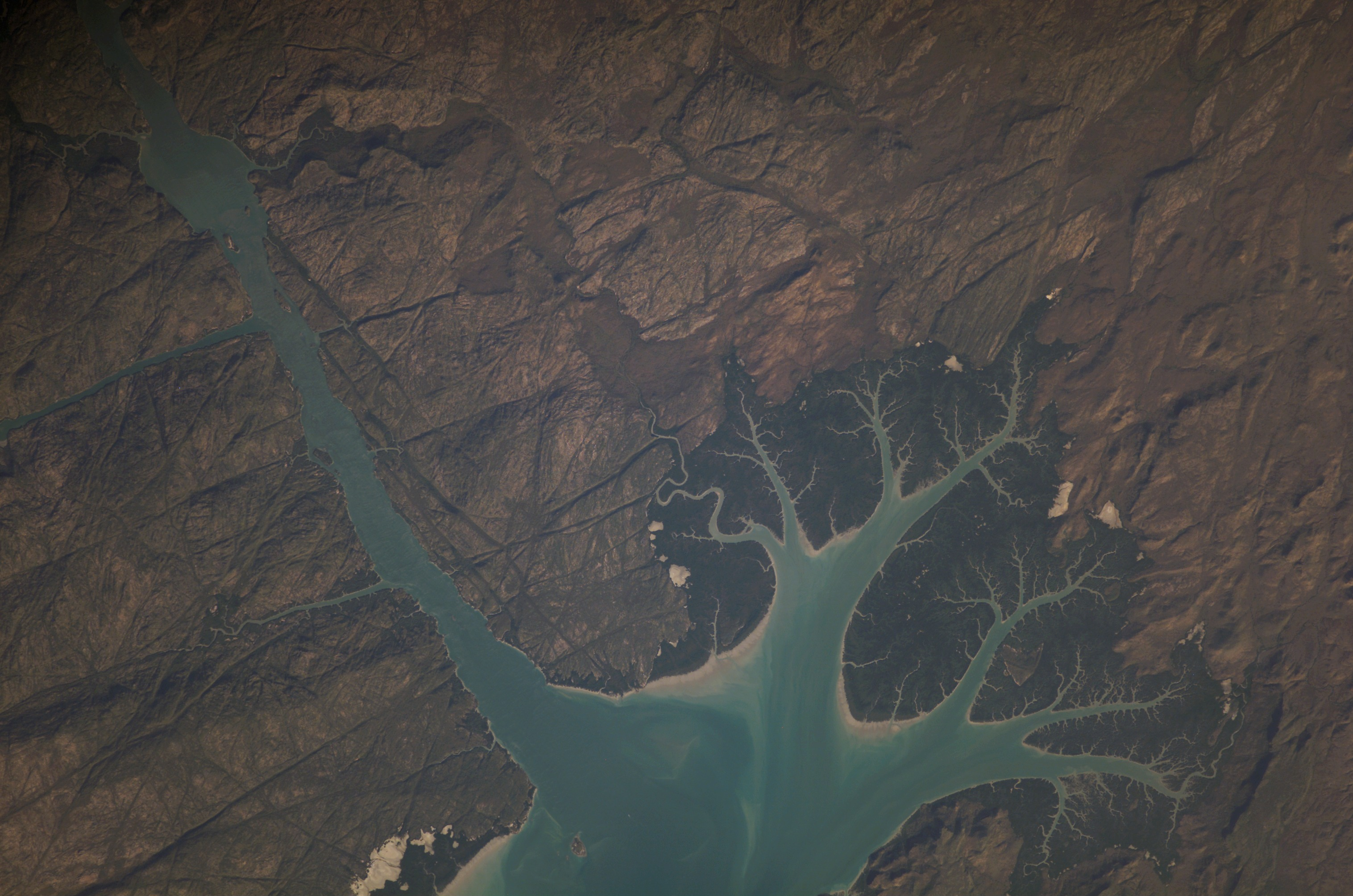
- Satellite image of the Prince Regent National Park, Prince Regent River and Saint George Basin taken by ISS Expedition 15
- Interactive map of Prince Regent National Park
- Coordinates: 15.5674°S 125.4685°E
- Area: 5,764 km^{2} (2,225 sq mi)
- Established: 1964
- Website: parks.dpaw.wa.gov.au/park/prince-regent

Prince Regent National Park, formerly the Prince Regent Nature Reserve, is a protected area in the Kimberley region of Western Australia. In 1978 the area was nominated as a UNESCO World Biosphere Reserve.

== Land ==
The national park covers a total area of 5,764 square kilometres (2,225 sq mi) and was created in 1964 to protect the catchment area of the Prince Regent River. The northern boundary of the national park abuts the southern boundary of the Mitchell River National Park creating a protected area of over 7,500 square kilometres (2,900 sq mi). The landscape of the reserve ranges from lush rainforest to sandstone plains. The area contains gorges, waterfalls, cliffs and mountain ranges.

Careening Bay, on Coronation Island, site of "The Mermaid Tree" (after HMS Mermaid, Philip Parker King's ship) is within the park. The boab tree was inscribed by the ship's carpenter when the vessel was deliberately careened (beached) in order to undertake repairs.

=== Traditional owners ===
The traditional owners of the area round the river are the Worrorra peoples, but the park lies mainly in Wunambal land.

As part of the same native title claim lodged in 1998 by Wanjina Wunggurr RNTBC known as the Dambimangari claim, which included claims for the three peoples in the Wanjina Wunggurr cultural bloc, referred to as Dambimangari (Worrorra), Uunguu (Wunambal) and Wilinggin (Ngarinyin), the Uunguu parts of the claims were determined on 23 May 2011. This gave native title to the Wunambal people over 25,909 km^{2} (10,004 sq mi), stretching along the coastal waters from the Anjo Peninsula in the north, including the waters of Admiralty Gulf and York Sound, down to Coronation Island. Inland, it includes parts of the Mitchell River National Park and the Prince Regent National Park.

== Wildlife ==
More than half of the bird and mammal species found in the Kimberley region are found within the national park. It is home to the monjon, the smallest of the rock-wallabies, and the golden bandicoot - listed as a vulnerable species. The Prince Regent and Mitchell River Important Bird Area which overlaps part of the national park, is an area identified as an Important Bird Area by BirdLife International, an international non-government organisation, because of its importance for a range of bird species, especially those restricted to tropical savanna habitats. Eighteen freshwater fish species are known to inhabit the waters of the Prince Regent River. Other species, like the monjon and saltwater crocodiles, also inhabit this area.

== Crocodile attacks ==
- In 29 March 1987, American 24-year-old model named Ginger Meadows was killed by a crocodile while standing under the waterfall of the near Broome, the day before her 25th birthday.
- In 2012, a tour operator was bitten on the leg while swimming in Dugong Bay, near Broome, by a crocodile, making it the first reported attack at the time.
- In 2015, a woman was attacked by a saltwater crocodile while swimming in a rockpool with a tour group.

== Access ==
The area remains one of Australia's most remote wilderness areas with no roads and formidable tide-races and whirlpools restricting seaward access. The area is mostly accessed by air or by boat and has remained virtually unchanged since European settlement of Western Australia. A permit is required to enter the national park and can be obtained from the Department of Parks and Wildlife.

== See also ==
- List of biosphere reserves in Australia
