= Yawijibaya =

Indigenous people of Western Australia

The Yawijibaya, also written Jaudjibaia, are an Aboriginal Australian people of the Kimberley region of northern Western Australia. Along with the Unggarranggu people, they are the traditional owners of the Buccaneer Archipelago, off Derby, together known as the Mayala group for native title purposes. Yawijibaya country includes Yawajaba Island and the surrounding Montgomery Reef.

== History ==
The missionary and expert on the Worrorra, J. R. B. Love maintained that the Yawijibaya were being completely assimilated into the Worrorra people by the 1930s, as a clan of the latter's Atpalar moiety. Valda Blundell recorded that in the early 1970s there was still one very old Yawijibaya man from the Montgomery group resident at the Lombidina mission.

== Country ==
Yawijibaya country, altogether a little less than 50 square miles (130 km^{2}), was confined to the Montgomery Islands, the surrounding Montgomery Reef, and the islands in the southern area of Collier Bay. The main island (called Montgomery Island by Europeans) in the group was called Jawutjap /Yawijib(a))/Yawajaba.

The Yawijibaya and Unggarranggu peoples are the traditional owners of Buccaneer Archipelago, together known as the Mayala group for native title purposes.

== Mayala Marine Park ==
As of 2020, there is a proposal for a 660,000-hectare (1,600,000-acre) marine park, which will cover the Indian Ocean surrounding the Dampier Peninsula, including the many islands of the Buccaneer Archipelago. There will be three marine parks: the Lalang-gaddam Marine Park (which includes Camden Sound, Horizontal Falls and two other parks) in Dambeemangarddee waters to the north; the Mayala Marine Park will cover the Buccaneer islands, the land and waters of the Mayala group; the Bardi Jawi Marine Park is the most southerly of the three. Each will be jointly managed by the local traditional owner groups.

== Language ==
The Yawijibaya language appears to have been a dialect closely related to the Worrorra branch of the mainland Worrorran language family, and similar to Umiida and Unggarrangu. Though little is known of it, a brief grammar survives, written up by the missionary Howard Coate.

== Social organisation and culture ==
The Yawijibaya moiety system was essentially identical to that which prevailed among the mainland tribes on the coast opposite. While Coate and Norman Tindale stated that the Yawijibaya were strictly islanders, Valda Blundell's informants claimed two Yawijibaya clans had mainland estates, while another two maintains their estates on the Montgomery and the High Cliffy islands. She also thought that the mainland norm of asymmetrical wife exchanges between tribes obtaining on the continent was not repeated among the Yawijibaya, who were said to maintain a restricted inter-island clan system of wife exchange. The evidence is difficult to evaluate, given it came not from living Yawijibaya, but informants from tribes where amalgamation of customs had already taken place for some considerable time.

Excavations on High Cliffy Island have uncovered extensive stone structures, some consisting of dry-stone formwork only evidenced elsewhere on the other side of the continent at Lake Condah in Victoria. The island lies east of the Montgomery Islands. It takes its name from the geophysical feature of steeply rising up cliffs to a height of some 15 metres. In addition, 3 rock shelters, and several work sites, high-quality quartz sandstone, chert and limestone quarries, dugong-butchering areas and places for working metal harpoons, were revealed. Given the presence of glassware, pottery and clay pipe material, it was suggested initially that the stone building might have been the handiwork of Makassar traders. The analysis concluded that the structures were of Aboriginal manufacture. One possibility is that they are the remains of monsoonal refuges, where the Yawijibaya could retire to, to escape the mosquito and sandfly infestations that would have plagued their low-lying mangrove-fringed islands as the rains set in.

The quarry works clearly have a trade purpose and are unique for the area and are unexampled on otherwise similar mainland locations, O'Connors argues:

large quantities of artefactual material found all over the High Cliffy Island testify to a level of stone working not seen in any of the mainland rockshelters and open sites.

== Mythology ==
Howard Coate suggested that the rai myths of a spirit-child, encountered widely in this region, and also among the island and coastal peoples (Bardi, Umiida and Unggarranggu) contiguous with the Yawijibaya, formed part of Yawijibaya thinking. These properly refer to "conception totems" (raya).

According to one of their legends, the islands once formed a continuous landmass, which was destroyed when a tidal event washed over the area, leaving only islands in its wake.

== Alternative names ==
- Bergalgu (According to Joseph Birdsell this was the name for their language)
- Jadjiba
- Jadjibaia, Jaudjibara
- Jawutjubar
- MontgomeryIslanders
- Yaudjibaia, Yaujibaia

Source: Tindale 1974, p. 242

== The von Brandenstein hypothesis ==
In the sparse ethnographic literature, remarks are to be found to the effect that the Yawijibaya were physically quite dissimilar to other Indigenous peoples of the region. Love stated that they were of "men of a distinct physical type". The Yawijibaya ethnonym figured as part of the key linguistic evidence which Carl Georg von Brandenstein adduced in support of his claim that there was a secret Portuguese prehistory of colonisation of Australia, a theory he based on etymologies of words in East Kimberley place-names. He argued that there were two moieties on the Montgomery isles, the Yawuji-Bara and the Yawuji-Baia. These, von Brandenstein thought, made sense once they were re-analysed as forms of a Portuguese creole respectively going back to avós-de-bara ("ancestors of the bar/breakwater") and avós de-baia ("ancestors of the bay"). In von Brandenstein's reconstruction, it followed that the Yawijibaya were descendants of Portuguese African slaves who had persisted in speaking their creole long after their masters had forsaken the island, and this deeply affected the language that was spoken there.

Aside from the fact that no such tribal opposition has been attested in the ethnographical literature, the phonetic distinction it was based on probably did not exist, the first term simply representing a mishearing of the second, yawiji-baya.

== Sources ==
- "AIATSIS map of Indigenous Australia". AIATSIS. 14 May 2024.
- Blundell, Valda J. (1975). Aboriginal Adaptation in Northwest Australia (PhD thesis). University of Wisconsin–Madison.
- Bowern, Claire (2016). "Language and land in the Northern Kimberley" (PDF). In Austin, Peter K.; Koch, Harold; Simpson, Jane (eds.). Language, land & song: Studies in honour of Luise Hercus. EL Publishing. pp. 277–286. ISBN 978-0-728-60406-3.
- Coate, H. H. J. (December 1966). "The Rai and the Third Eye North-West Australian Beliefs". Oceania. 37 (2): 93–123. doi:10.1002/j.1834-4461.1966.tb01790.x. JSTOR 40329629.
- McGregor, William B. (2002). Verb Classification in Australian Languages. Walter de Gruyter. ISBN 978-3-110-87087-9.
- McGregor, William B. (2013). The Languages of the Kimberley, Western Australia. Routledge. ISBN 978-1-134-39602-3.
- McGregor, William B.; Mühlhäusler, Peter (1996). "Post-contact languages of Western Australia". In Wurm, Stephen Adolphe; Mühlhäusler, Peter; Tryon, Darrell (eds.). Atlas of Languages of Intercultural Communication in the Pacific, Asia, and the Americas: Vol I: Maps. Vol II: Texts. Walter de Gruyter. pp. 101–121. ISBN 978-3-110-87087-9.
- Memmott, Paul (2007). Gunyah, Goondie + Wurley: The Aboriginal Architecture of Australia. University of Queensland Press. ISBN 978-0-702-23245-9.
- O'Connor, Sue (December 1987). "The Stone House Structures of High Cliffy Island, North West Kimberley, WA". Australian Archaeology. 25 (25): 30–39. doi:10.1080/03122417.1987.12093123. JSTOR 40286747.
- "Tindale Tribal Boundaries" (PDF). Department of Aboriginal Affairs, Western Australia. September 2016. Archived from the original (PDF) on 8 March 2016.
- Tindale, Norman Barnett (1974). "Jaudjibaia (WA)". Aboriginal Tribes of Australia: Their Terrain, Environmental Controls, Distribution, Limits, and Proper Names. Australian National University. ISBN 978-0-708-10741-6. Archived from the original on 20 March 2020.
