= Irvine Island =

Island of Western Australia

Coordinates: 16°04′34″S 123°32′13″E

Location of Irvine Island

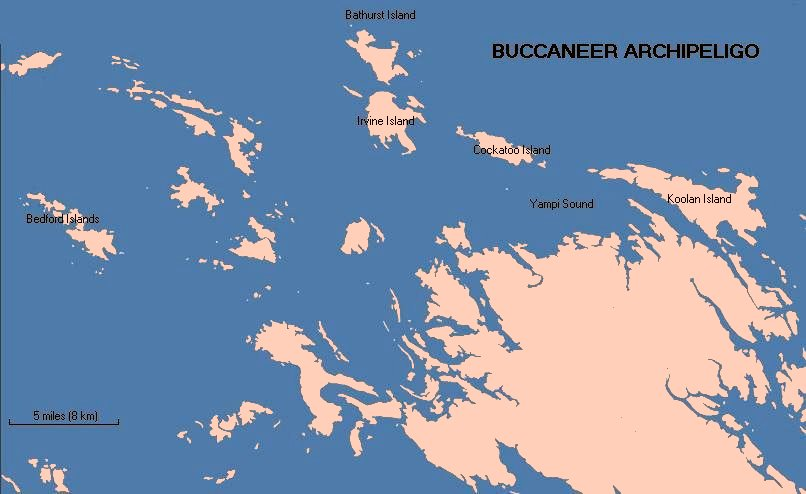
Map of Irvine Island and nearby islands

Irvine Island is located 11 km (6.8 mi) off the Kimberley coast of Western Australia in the Buccaneer Archipelago. It is about 250 km (160 mi) northeast of Broome and 140 km (87 mi) north of Derby. Irvine Island is located near Koolan and Cockatoo Islands, on the same iron-mineralized rock formation. Irvine Island has a surface area of 893 hectares (2,207 acres) and is 5 kilometres (3 mi) west of Cockatoo Island.

== Geology and mineralisation ==
Irvine Island is composed of rocks of the Yampi Formation, a Paleoproterozoic Statherian-age sedimentary sequence of quartz sandstone, hematitic sandstone, feldspathic sandstone, siltstone, and hematitic conglomerate.

Irvine Island, with two neighbouring islands, Koolan and Cockatoo, is part of a belt of iron ore mineralization formed at the base of the Yampi Formation. The ore is mainly of hematite, with small amounts of magnetite. The ore grades laterally into hematitic conglomerate or hematitic sandstone. The sediments of the Yampi Formation were deposited near a shoreline where iron-rich heavy minerals were concentrated on a beach or nearshore bar by prolonged reworking. Mines on Koolan and Cockatoo Islands have been in production since 1951, while the deposits on Irvine island are still in exploration assessment.

== Historical exploration ==
Australian Iron and Steel, a subsidiary of BHP, explored for iron on Koolan, Cockatoo and Irvine Islands from the early 20th century. Three mineral claims and two mining leases were granted to AIS on Irvine Island in the mid-1930s and early 1950s.
