= Hidden Island =

Island of Western Australia

Hidden
- Location within Western Australia

Geography
- Coordinates: 16.2431°S 123.4824°E
- Area: 1,901 ha (4,700 acres)
- Length: 8 km (5 mi)
- Width: 5 km (3.1 mi)
- Highest elevation: 135 m (443 ft)

Administration
- Australia

Demographics
- Population: 0

Hidden Island, known to the traditional owners as Banggoon, is an uninhabited island in the Kimberley region of Western Australia.

It is situated in the western group of the Buccaneer Archipelago, of which it is the largest island. Found approximately 45 kilometres (28 mi) east of Bardi, it covers an area of about 1,901 hectares (4,697 acres). It has an irregular shape with a length of about 5 miles (8 km) running from north to south and is 3.25 miles (5 km) at its widest point.

The highest point of the island has an elevation of 135 metres (443 ft), at the southern end. Another hill with a height of 97 metres (318 ft) is located at the northern end. The island is covered in low scrub and stunted gum trees.

Hidden Island is separated from nearby Chambers Island by Whirlpool Passage. The passage is dangerous during peak tidal movement with a flow rate of over 10 knots (12 mph) and numerous 1-metre-deep (3 ft) whirlpools. It is separated from the mainland by a narrow channel.

Priority flora found on the area include Solanum leopoldense Symon.

The Aboriginal Australian traditional owners of the area are the Mayala (the Yawijibaya and Unggarranggu) peoples of the Worrorran languages group, whose name for the island is Banggoon.
