= Kimberley Marine Park =

Australian marine park offshore of Western Australia, near the Kimberley region

- IUCN category VI (protected area with sustainable use of natural resources)
- Map showing the Kimberley Marine Park. The shaded area is a National Park Zone ('no take' zone).
- Location: Australia
- Coordinates: 15.1138°S 123.7170°E
- Area: 74,469 km^{2} (28,753 sq mi)
- Established: 1 July 2018
- Operator: Parks Australia
- Website: https://parksaustralia.gov.au/marine/parks/north-west

The Kimberley Marine Park, formerly known as the Kimberley Commonwealth Marine Reserve and also known as the Great Kimberley Marine Park, is an Australian marine park offshore of Western Australia, near the Kimberley region. Proclaimed under the EPBC Act in 2013, the marine park covers an area of 74,469 km^{2} (28,753 sq mi) and is assigned IUCN category VI. It is one of the 13 parks managed under the North-west Marine Parks Network. It covers a number of state-managed marine parks.

== Conservation values ==
=== Species and habitat ===
- Important foraging areas for migratory seabirds, migratory dugongs, dolphins and threatened and migratory marine turtles.
- Important migration pathway and nursery areas for the protected humpback whale.
- Adjacent to important foraging and pupping areas for sawfish and important nesting sites for green turtles.
- The reserve provides protection for the communities and habitats of waters offshore of the Kimberley coastline ranging in depth from less than 15 metres to 800 metres.

=== Bioregions and ecology ===
- Continental shelf, slope, plateau, pinnacle, terrace, banks and shoals and deep hole/valley seafloor features are all represented in this reserve
- Examples of the communities and seafloor habitats of the Northwest Shelf Transition, Northwest Shelf Province and Timor Province provincial bioregions along with the Kimberley, Canning, Northwest Shelf and Oceanic Shoals meso-scale bioregions.
- Ancient coastline (an area of enhanced productivity attracting baitfish which, in turn, supplies food for migrating species).
- Continental slope demersal fish communities (the second richest area for demersal fish species in Australia).

== History ==
The marine park was proclaimed under the EPBC Act on 14 December 2013 as the Kimberley Commonwealth Marine Reserve and renamed Kimberley Marine Park on 9 October 2017. The management plan and protection measures of the marine park came into effect for the first time on 1 July 2018.

== Summary of protection zones ==
The Kimberley Marine Park has been assigned IUCN protected area category VI. However, within the marine park there are three protection zones, each zone has an IUCN category and related rules for managing activities to ensure the protection of marine habitats and species.

The following table is a summary of the zoning rules within the Kimberley Marine Park:

Zone	IUCN	Activities permitted						Total area (km^{2})
Zone	IUCN	Vessel transiting	Recreational fishing	Commercial fishing	Commercial aquaculture	Commercial tourism	Mining	Total area (km^{2})
National Park	II	Yes	No	No	No	excludes fishing, with approval	No	406
Habitat Protection	IV	Yes	Yes	most, with approval	with approval	with approval	No	6,929
Multiple Use	VI	Yes	Yes	most, with approval	with approval	with approval	with approval	39,964
External link: Zoning and rules for the North-west Marine Parks Network

== State-based marine parks ==
The Government of Western Australia's Department of Biodiversity, Conservation and Attractions has been collaborating with the traditional owners of the respective areas in overseeing the planning, development and consolidation of a number of marine parks within the region,: in the first ever marine parks co-designed with traditional owners and the state government.

These comprise:

- Bardi Jawi Marine Park (proposed), in Bardi Jawi country.
- Lalang-gaddam Marine Park (in planning stages; formerly Great Kimberley Marine Park), which will cover Dambimangari waters:
  - Lalang-garram / Camden Sound Marine Park
  - Lalang-garram / Horizontal Falls Marine Park
  - North Lalang-garram Marine Park
  - Maiyalam Marine Park (gazetted 2020/21), covering the Buccaneer Archipelago
- North Kimberley Marine Park (2016), in Uunguu waters.

The proposed draft plan for the Bardi Jawi, Mayala and Maiyalam marine parks was put up for public consultation in late 2020. Under the plan, covering 6,600 km^{2} (2,500 sq mi), recreational fishing would be banned or restricted in 40 per cent of the area, which ignited debate about fishing rights. In November 2021 a revised plan was issued, after 17,000 submissions had been received. The new plan allowed greater access for recreational fishers, in particular addressing the concerns of local fishers. The final plan is expected to be released in early 2022.

== See also ==
- List of marine parks in Australia (incomplete)
- Protected areas managed by the Australian government
