= Horizontal Falls =

Natural phenomenon in Western Australia where spring tides create a waterfall

Horizontal Falls Horizontal Waterfalls, "Horries"
- Waterfall
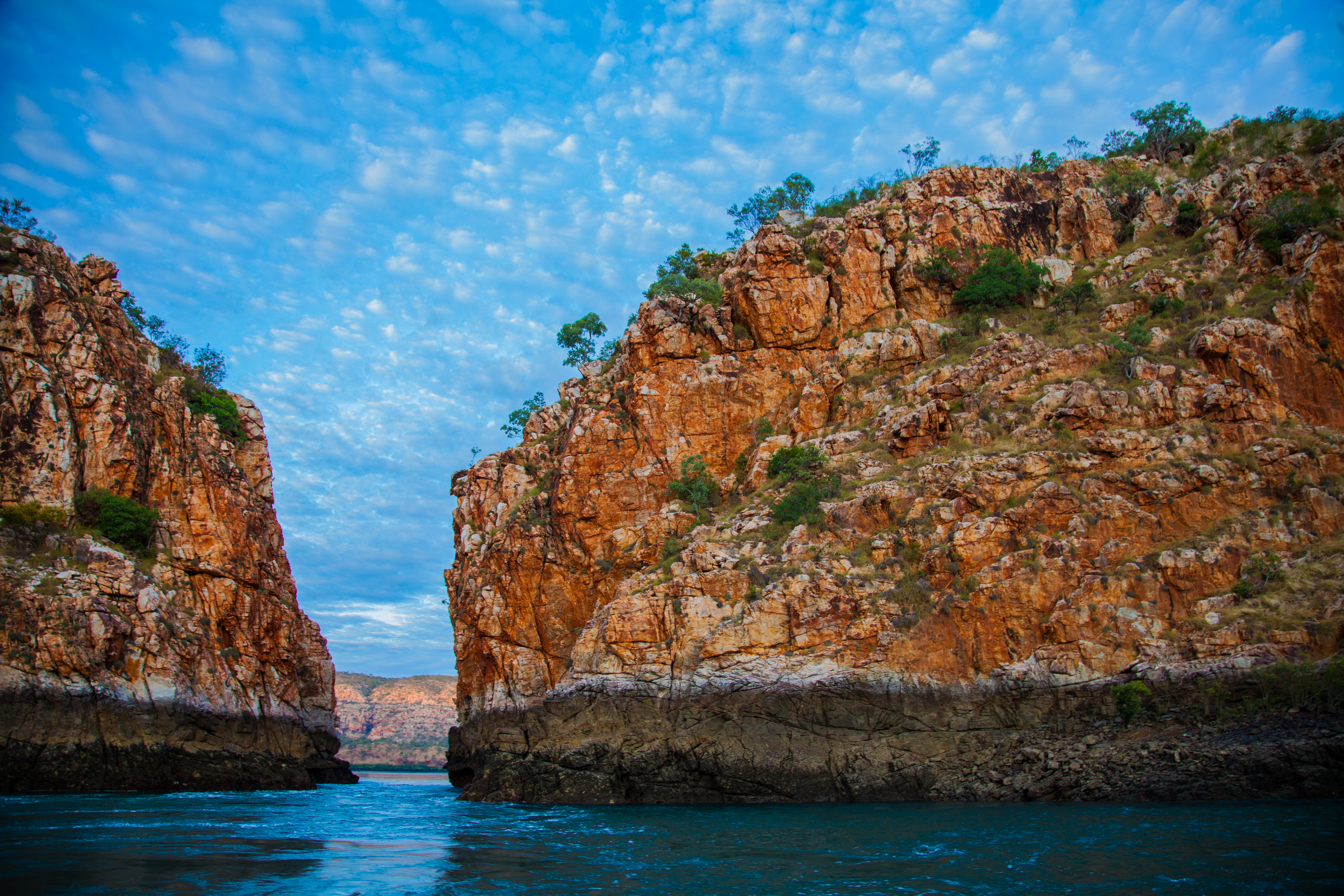

- Location within Australia Location within Western Australia
- Coordinates: 16.38325°S 123.95797°E
- Location: Kimberley region, Western Australia
- Part of: Talbot Bay
- Water bodies: Indian Ocean

Dimensions
  - Width: 10m (landward gap); 20m (seaward gap)
  - Drop: up to 4m
- Elevation: 0m
- Designation: Marine park
- Indigenous name: Garaanngaddim

The Horizontal Falls, or Horizontal Waterfalls, nicknamed the "Horries" and known as Garaanngaddim by the local Indigenous people, are an unusual natural phenomenon on the coast of the Kimberley region in Western Australia, where tidal flows cause waterfalls on the ebb and flow of each tide. The Lalang-garram / Horizontal Falls Marine Park is a protected area covering the falls and wider area.

== Description ==
The falls form when seawater rushes through two short and narrow gorges about 300 metres (1,000 ft) apart. They are located in the coastal McLarty Ranges within Talbot Bay (Ganbadba) in the Buccaneer Archipelago. The seaward gap is about 20 metres (70 ft) wide and the landward one is about 10 metres (30 ft).

The natural phenomenon is caused by tidal differences of up to 10 metres (33 ft). The water builds up on one side or the other faster than it can flow through them, creating a waterfall up to 4 metres (13 ft) high. With each change of the tide, the direction of the falls reverses.

The naturalist David Attenborough has called the falls "one of the greatest wonders of the natural world".

Boats can travel through the gap, and thrill-seeking tourists are catered for by several tourism companies. On May 27, 2022, the Horizontal Falls Seaplane Adventures was conducting a tour of the falls, when it ran into trouble, with 26 passengers and two crew on board: the vessel appeared to have collided with a rock wall. More than a dozen tourists were left with critical injuries and required surgery. The safe rescue of passengers was made more difficult due to the falls' remote location and accessibility only by sea and air. The presence of box jellyfish and estuarine crocodiles at the falls made rescue efforts more urgent.

Starting in 2026, the West Australian government has opted to cease boat trips through the gaps at the Falls because of the dangers and because the Dambimangari Aboriginal Corporation considered them to have sacred significance. Despite this change, visitors can still journey up to the entrance point of the Horizontal Falls to experience the tidal movements and the rock formations up close.

== Marine parks ==
The Kimberley Marine Park is a Commonwealth government area covered by the national EPBC Act, covering an expanse of ocean outside the limits of the Camden Sound and other state parks, stretching from south of King Sound to nearly the top of the North Kimberley Marine Park. This area consists mostly of Multiple Use Zone (IUCN VI), but also includes sections of national park (IUCN II) and Habitat Protection (IUCN IV) zones, the latter two mostly just outside the Camden Sound and King Sound areas.

=== Lalang-garram / Horizontal Falls Marine Park ===
The Lalang-garram / Horizontal Falls Marine Park is jointly managed by the Government of Western Australia's Department of Biodiversity, Conservation and Attractions (formerly the Department of Parks and Wildlife (DPaW)) via its agency, the Department of Parks & Wildlife and the traditional owners of the land and waters, the Dambimangari (Worrorra) group. The Dambimangari people chose the name "Lalang-garram", being a Worrorra word meaning "the saltwater as a spiritual place as well as a place of natural abundance", relating to the ocean in a general sense.

The Horizontal Falls are known as Garaanngaddim by the Dambimangari, and the Lalang-garram / Horizontal Falls and North Lalang-garram Marine Parks lie within their native title determination area. The two marine parks were declared by the Government of Western Australia.

=== New marine park ===
A 2016 management plan saw this park, along with the Lalang-garram / Camden Sound Marine Park and the North Kimberley Marine Park make up part of what was to be named the Great Kimberley Marine Park, covering about 30,000 square kilometres (12,000 sq mi) of coastal waters from west of Ganbadba (Talbot Bay) to the Northern Territory border.

In 2020, a new management plan was released, titled Lalang-gaddam Marine Park: Amended joint management plan for the Lalang-garram / Camden Sound, Lalang-garram / Horizontal Falls and North Lalang-garram marine parks and indicative joint management plan for the proposed Maiyalam Marine Park. It was published ahead of the gazettal of the proposed Maiyalam Marine Park under the CALM Act as a Class A reserve. Under the new arrangements, the zoning of the Camden Sound park would not change, but the plan is now to amalgamate the four marine parks (Lalang-garram / Horizontal Falls Marine Park, North Lalang-garram Marine Park and the new Maiyalam Marine Park) to form the Lalang-gaddam Marine Park, all in the sea country of the Dambeemangarddee people. This plan will be amended by another 10-year final joint management plan.

The new Maiyalam Marine Park will add 47,000 hectares (120,000 acres) to the Kimberley marine reserves. The larger plan is to create a total of 5,000,000 hectares (12,000,000 acres) of new national and marine reserves in Western Australia. The new spelling, "Lalang-gaddam", reflects the correct pronunciation of the word, and "Maiyalam" means "between islands", or "a gap through". The new Maiyalam Marine Park covers an area off the north-western coast of King Sound and around Macleay Island. The new Lalang-gaddam Marine Park borders the proposed Mayala Marine Park to the west (covering the Buccaneer Archipelago), and the North Kimberley Marine Park (Uunguu waters) to the north-east. The land and sea border to the south abut Bardi Jawi land and a proposed Bardi Jawi Marine Park. Maps show the extent of the various marine parks, native title determinations, zones within the areas, etc.

Details such as port areas are outlined in the plan. An Indigenous land use agreement (ILUA) already covers the Lalang-garram/ Camden Sound, Lalang-garram/ Horizontal Falls and North Lalang-garram marine parks, but an additional ILUA will be needed to allow the creation of the proposed Maiyalam Marine Park in accordance with the Native Title Act 1993. Much of Collier Bay will remain a general use zone, but the Walcott Inlet will be zoned as sanctuary.

== 2022 tour boat incident ==
On 27 May 2022 at around 7:00 am, the "Falls Express" tourist boat, owned by Horizontal Falls Seaplane Adventures, crashed into a rock wall at the falls, with 28 people on board. The Royal Flying Doctor Service deployed six aircraft to the scene, with a triage zone established at the Koolan Island iron ore mine nearby. 18 patients were transported by the service, the majority to Perth. Injuries included broken bones and head injuries.
