= Camden Sound =

Coastal feature in Western Australia

Coordinates: 15°26′47″S 124°25′5″E

Location of Camden Sound

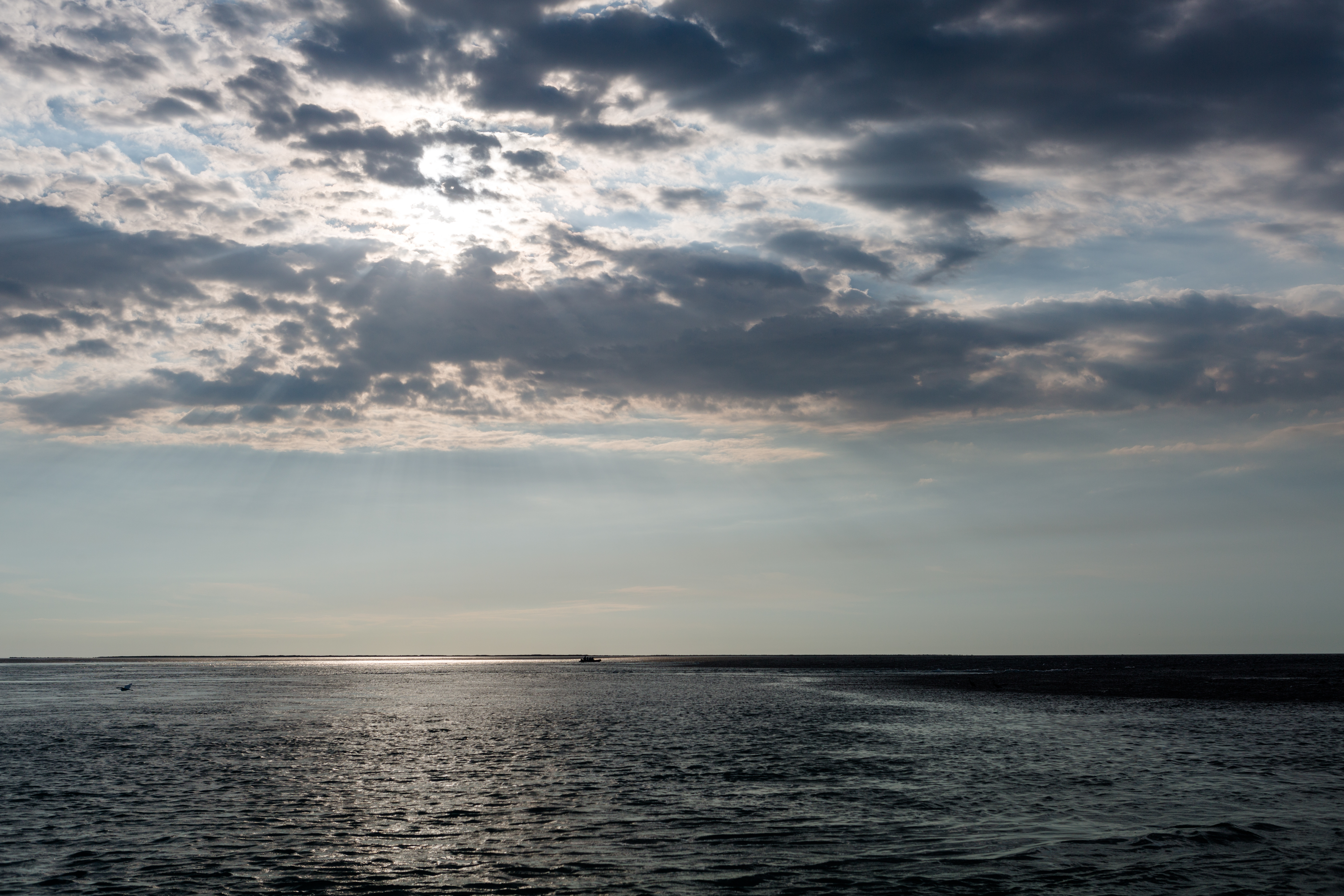
Montgomery Reef in Camden Sound

Camden Sound is a relatively wide body of water in the Indian Ocean located in the Kimberley region of Western Australia. The Sound is bounded by the Bonaparte Archipelago to the north-east, the Buccaneer Archipelago to the south-west, and Montgomery Reef (the eastern extent of Collier Bay) to the south.

The Sound is an important area for a number of marine animals, in particular as a breeding ground for various species of whales, and is home to the world's largest population of humpback whales. The Lalang-garram / Camden Sound Marine Park is jointly managed by the Government of Western Australia's Department of Biodiversity, Conservation and Attractions. The marine park lies about 300 km (190 mi) north-east of Broome, and is the second largest marine park in Western Australia after Shark Bay. As of 2020, there is a plan to include this and three other nearby marine parks into one large marine park called Lalang-gaddam Marine Park (formerly named Great Kimberley Marine Park).

== History ==
Aboriginal peoples lived and fished in the area for a long time before the colonisation of Western Australia.

Camden Sound was "discovered" by Captain Phillip Parker King on HMS Bathurst on 15 August 1821. He named the sound Camden Bay after John Pratt, 1st Marquess Camden.

Camden Harbour was a short-lived settlement within the sound.

Three native title claims have been registered in the area of the marine park by the Dambimangari, Uunguu and Mayala native title groups. The Dambimangari claim lies over the majority of the park, with the Uunguu claim overlying a small portion of the St George Basin, and Mayala at the southwestern end of the park.

== Description ==
Camden Sound is bounded by the Bonaparte Archipelago to the north-east (Augustus Island being the largest in this group), the Buccaneer Archipelago to the south-west (stretching to Sunday Island), and Montgomery Reef (the eastern extent of Collier Bay) to the south. Camden Sound includes Champagny, Byam Martin and the Heywood Islands to the west (all part of the Bonaparte Archipelago), and Bumpus Island, Rice Rocks, Sampson Inlet, Deception Bay and Prior Point to the south.

There is no road access and the nearest town is Kalumburu, 268 km (167 mi) to the east.

The area is a drowned valley in the western end of the MacDonald Range, the islands that are found within the sound are remnant emergent features formed by basalt and sandstone formations.

As with the rest of the Kimberley coast, the area is marked by an extreme tidal variation of up to 11 m (36 ft) on a spring tide.

== Environmental importance ==
The area has received worldwide recognition as a crucial breeding and calving area for the Breeding Group D population of humpback whales (Megaptera novaeangliae) – at approximately 22,000 individuals, the world's largest humpback whale population. The calves are suckled in the warm, tropical waters for several months until they gain the strength for the journey back to the Antarctic for summer feeding. Camden Sound is rich in other cetaceans including the Australian snubfin dolphin, blue whales, pygmy killer whales, pilot whales and bottlenose dolphins. In addition, the area is surrounded by fringing reefs with hard and soft corals, turtles, molluscs, fish and marine invertebrates.

=== Marine park ===
The Kimberley Marine Park is a Commonwealth government area covered by the national EPBC Act, covering an expanse of ocean outside the limits of the Camden Sound and other state parks, stretching from south of King Sound to nearly the top of the North Kimberley Marine Park. This area consists mostly of Multiple Use Zone (IUCN VI), but also includes sections of national park (IUCN II) and Habitat Protection (IUCN IV) zones, the latter two mostly just outside the Camden Sound and King Sound areas.

==== Camden Sound ====
The Camden Sound Marine Park was the first of four new marine parks announced under the Kimberley Science and Conservation Strategy, and covers an area of 7,062 km^{2} (2,727 sq mi). In October 2009, Donna Faragher, Western Australia's Environment Minister, announced that Camden Sound would become the Kimberley's first Marine Park, largely in recognition of the area's status as nursery and breeding area to the world's largest population of humpback whales. The park is the second largest in Western Australia after Shark Bay, and links to the Prince Regent National Park. The area includes Montgomery Reef, Champagny Island and St George Basin.

The Lalang-garram / Camden Sound Marine Park is jointly managed by the Government of Western Australia's Department of Biodiversity, Conservation and Attractions (formerly the Department of Parks and Wildlife (DPaW)) via its agency, the Department of Parks & Wildlife and the traditional owners, the Dambimangari group. It is the first jointly managed marine park in Australia, and has benefited from the involvement of the traditional owners of the land and waters. The Dambimangari people chose the name "Lalang-garram", being a Worrorra word meaning “the saltwater as a spiritual place as well as a place of natural abundance”, relating to the ocean in a general sense. The conservation objectives of the government and the traditional owners are aligned, with the latter wanting to ensure that their saltwater country stays in good health, and that no plants or animals become extinct in the area. Many species and ecosystems have cultural significance to the local peoples, including the humpback whale.

The park is divided into different zones, with differing levels of protection, which are subject to change as management plans evolve. The initial plan included several different zones, including a whale sanctuary zone of approximately 1,067 km^{2} (412 sq mi), two sanctuary zones comprising about 20% of the marine park area around Champagny Islands and Montgomery Reef, a pearling industry zone, and general use zones. Another 48% of the park was closed to trawling and 23% of the park closed to commercial fishing. The 2013–2023 management plan maintained the zones specified by the Conservation and Land Management Act 1984 (the "CALM Act"): sanctuary, recreation, special purpose or general use zones.

The marine park recognises two broad themes:

1. Habitat - comprising both geomorphic habitat (such as rocky shores and platforms) and biological habitat (such as seagrass)
2. Species of special conservation interest - comprising those species which are listed as having special conservation status (such as humpback whales) as well as species which are extracted for human use (such as targeted finfish).

Access to the park is usually via one of the many cruise vessels that operate between Broome, Wyndham, Darwin and Cairns.

==== Marine parks established in 2020 ====
A 2016 management plan saw this park, along with the Lalang-garram / Horizontal Falls Marine Park and the North Kimberley Marine Park make up part of what was to be named the Great Kimberley Marine Park, covering about 30,000 km^{2} (12,000 sq mi) of coastal waters from west of Ganbadba (Talbot Bay) to the Northern Territory border.

In 2020, a new management plan was released, titled Lalang-gaddam Marine Park: Amended joint management plan for the Lalang-garram / Camden Sound, Lalang-garram / Horizontal Falls and North Lalang-garram marine parks and indicative joint management plan for the proposed Maiyalam Marine Park. It was published ahead of the gazettal of the proposed Maiyalam Marine Park under the CALM Act as a Class A reserve. Under the new arrangements, the zoning of the Camden Sound park would not change, but the plan is now to amalgamate the four marine parks (Lalang-garram / Horizontal Falls Marine Park, North Lalang-garram Marine Park and the new Maiyalam Marine Park) to form the Lalang-gaddam Marine Park, all in the sea country of the Dambeemangarddee people. This plan will be amended by another 10-year final joint management plan.

The new Maiyalam Marine Park will create add 47,000 ha (120,000 acres) to the Kimberley marine reserves. The larger plan is to create a total of 5,000,000 ha (12,000,000 acres) of new national and marine reserves in Western Australia. The new spelling, "Lalang-gaddam", reflects the correct pronunciation of the word, and "Maiyalam" means "between islands", or "a gap through". The new Maiyalam Marine Park covers an area off the north-western coast of King Sound and around Macleay Island. The new Lalang-gaddam Marine Park borders the proposed Mayala Marine Park to the south-west (covering the Buccaneer Archipelago), and the North Kimberley Marine Park (Uunguu waters) to the north-east. The land and sea border to the south abut Bardi Jawi land and a proposed Bardi Jawi Marine Park. Maps show the extent of the various marine parks, native title determinations, zones within the areas, etc.

Details such as port areas are outlined in the plan. An Indigenous land use agreement (ILUA) already covers the Lalang-garram/ Camden Sound, Lalang-garram/ Horizontal Falls and North Lalang-garram marine parks, but an additional ILUA will be needed to allow the creation of the proposed Maiyalam Marine Park in accordance with the Native Title Act 1993. Much of Collier Bay will remain a general use zone, but the Walcott Inlet will be zoned as sanctuary.
