= Yampi Sound =

Bight in Western Australia

Coordinates: 16°07′38″S 123°33′36″E

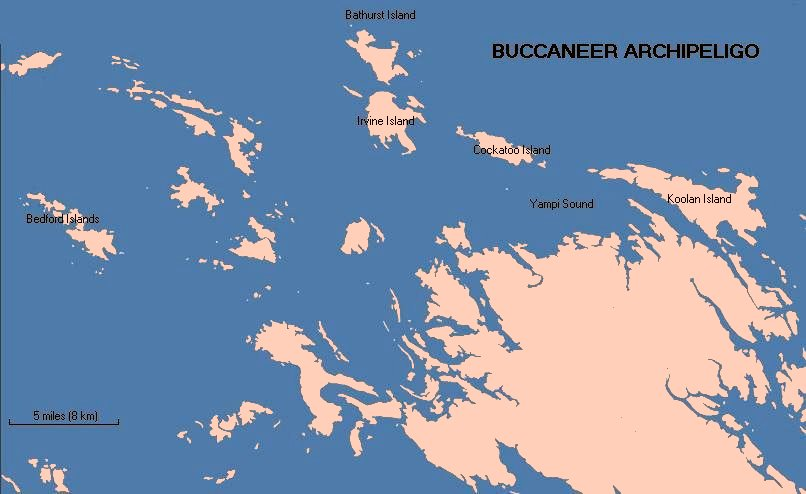
Map of Yampi Sound

Yampi Sound is a part of the Indian Ocean off the coast of north-western Australia, in the Kimberley region of Western Australia. It is located between King Sound and Collier Bay. It lies between the Yampi Peninsula and the islands of the Buccaneer Archipelago, which contain important iron ore deposits.

== History ==
The traditional owners of the areas around the sound are the Umiida people.

The sound was visited in March 1838 by Lieutenant John Lort Stokes of HMS Beagle, who named Yampee Point, Yampee being the local Aboriginal people's word for fresh water. The sound is off the Yampi Peninsula, which is bounded by King Sound to the south, Collier Bay to the north, and the Wunaamin Miliwundi Ranges inland on the north-eastern side.

During World War II, several raids were launched against the Japanese forces in Borneo and Java using Catalina flying boats by the Royal Australian Air Force from Cockatoo Island in Yampi Sound.

== Description ==
Yampi Sound is located between King Sound and Collier Bay. It contains many islands of the Buccaneer Archipelago, the largest being Koolan Island. Others include: Cockatoo Island, Conilurus Island, Irvine Island, Bathurst Island, Gibbings Island, Hidden Island, and the Baylis Islands.

High grade iron ore has been mined from Koolan and Cockatoo Islands since 1951. A small copper mine also operated at Coppermine Creek on the mainland side of the sound, which in the period 1915–1916 produced ore containing 23.43 tonnes (51,700 lb) of copper, worth £A 1,504, equivalent to A$171,510 in 2022.

The Australian Defence Force has maintained a training facility at Yampi Sound since the 1970s.
