= Pterolophia australis =

Scientific classification
- Kingdom: Animalia
- Phylum: Arthropoda
- Class: Insecta
- Order: Coleoptera
- Suborder: Polyphaga
- Infraorder: Cucujiformia
- Family: Cerambycidae
- Genus: Pterolophia
- Species: P. australis

Binomial name
- Pterolophia australis Breuning, 1957

Species of beetle

Pterolophia australis is a species of beetle in the family Cerambycidae. It was described by Stephan von Breuning in 1957. The species is 9 millimetres (0.35 in) long and 3 millimetres (0.12 in) wide. It is endemic to Cockatoo Island.
