= Byron Island =

Byron Island may refer to:

- Nikunau, Kiribati 1°21′S 176°27′E
- Byron Island (Buccaneer Archipelago), Western Australia 16°09′45″S 123°26′55″E
- Byron Island, Chile (es:Isla Byron) in Guayaneco Archipelago, Chile.
