= Champagny Island =

Island in Western Australia

Champagny
- Interactive map of Champagny

Geography
- Coordinates: 15°18′03″S 124°15′29″E
- Total islands: 1
- Area: 1,337 ha (3,300 acres)

Administration
- Commonwealth of Australia
- State: Western Australia
- Region: Kimberley
- Shire: Wyndham-East Kimberley

Demographics
- Population: 0

Champagny Island, known to the traditional owners as Nimenba, is an island off the coast of the Kimberley region in Western Australia.

Located on the western side of Camden Sound and part of the Champagny Islands group within the Bonaparte Archipelago, the island encompasses an area of 1,337 hectares (3,304 acres).

The Aboriginal Australian traditional owners of the area are the Dambimangari peoples of the Worrorran languages group, whose name for the island is Nimenba.

The island was named by Nicholas Baudin in 1801 after the French diplomat and statesman, Jean-Baptiste de Nompère de Champagny, 1st duc de Cadore.

Birds found on the island include the brown quail, eastern reef egret, brown falcon, whimbrel, beach stone-curlew, sooty oystercatcher, bar-shouldered dove, Horsfield's bronze-cuckoo, rainbow bee-eater and the red-capped plover.

It lies within the Camden Sound Marine Park that was gazetted in 2012 and covers an area of 7,062 square kilometres (2,727 sq mi). The park is the second largest in Western Australia after Shark Bay and links to the Prince Regent National Park. The area also includes Montgomery Reef and St George Basin.
