= Cape Londonderry =

Northern most point in Western Australia

Coordinates: 13°44′27″S 126°57′40″E

The Cape Londonderry region on a nautical chart

Cape Londonderry is the northernmost point of mainland Western Australia, as well as the southwestern corner of the Timor Sea. It lies east of Cape Talbot and northeast of Kalumburu (the nearest settlement), in Western Australia's Kimberley region and is part of the North Kimberley Marine Park.

== History ==
The cape was surveyed by the Royal Navy Captain Philip Parker King in 1818 and named after Robert Stewart, the 2nd Marquess of Londonderry, the United Kingdom's then Foreign Secretary. In doing so, he also discovered a safer route to navigate through the Percy Isles and Torres Strait. Plans to build an airstrip and fishing base there were approved by Western Australia's Environmental Protection Authority in 1992, but are yet to go ahead. Cape Londonderry is part of the North Kimberley Marine Park. A prawn fishery that spans Cape Londonderry to Cape York in Queensland was later established under the jurisdiction of the Australian Fisheries Management Authority, with the agreement of the Western Australia, Northern Territory and Queensland state governments.

Cape Londonderry has often been a location whereby foreign registered boats illegally fish there, resulting in regular Australian Border Force boat patrols being needed in the area. It is noted for its high winds and its foul drying reefs that run for six miles between it and Cape Talbot. Regular sailing guides advise caution when sailors are traversing Cape Londonderry en-route to King Sound.
