= InterSector =

InterSector is a Western Australian government publication that followed the earlier Public Service notices (Perth, W.A.). The formal title is InterSector : official newsletter of the Western Australian Public Sector.

Articles in the publication include history of various government instrumentalities, as well as items of information about government funded bodies.

== See also ==
- Western Australian Government Gazette
