= Buccaneer Archipelago =

Archipelago of the Western Australian Kimberley coast

Location of the Buccaneer Archipelago

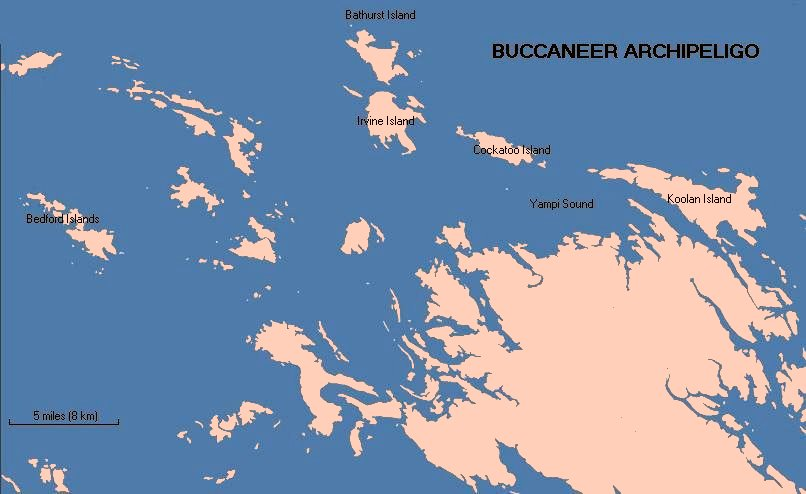

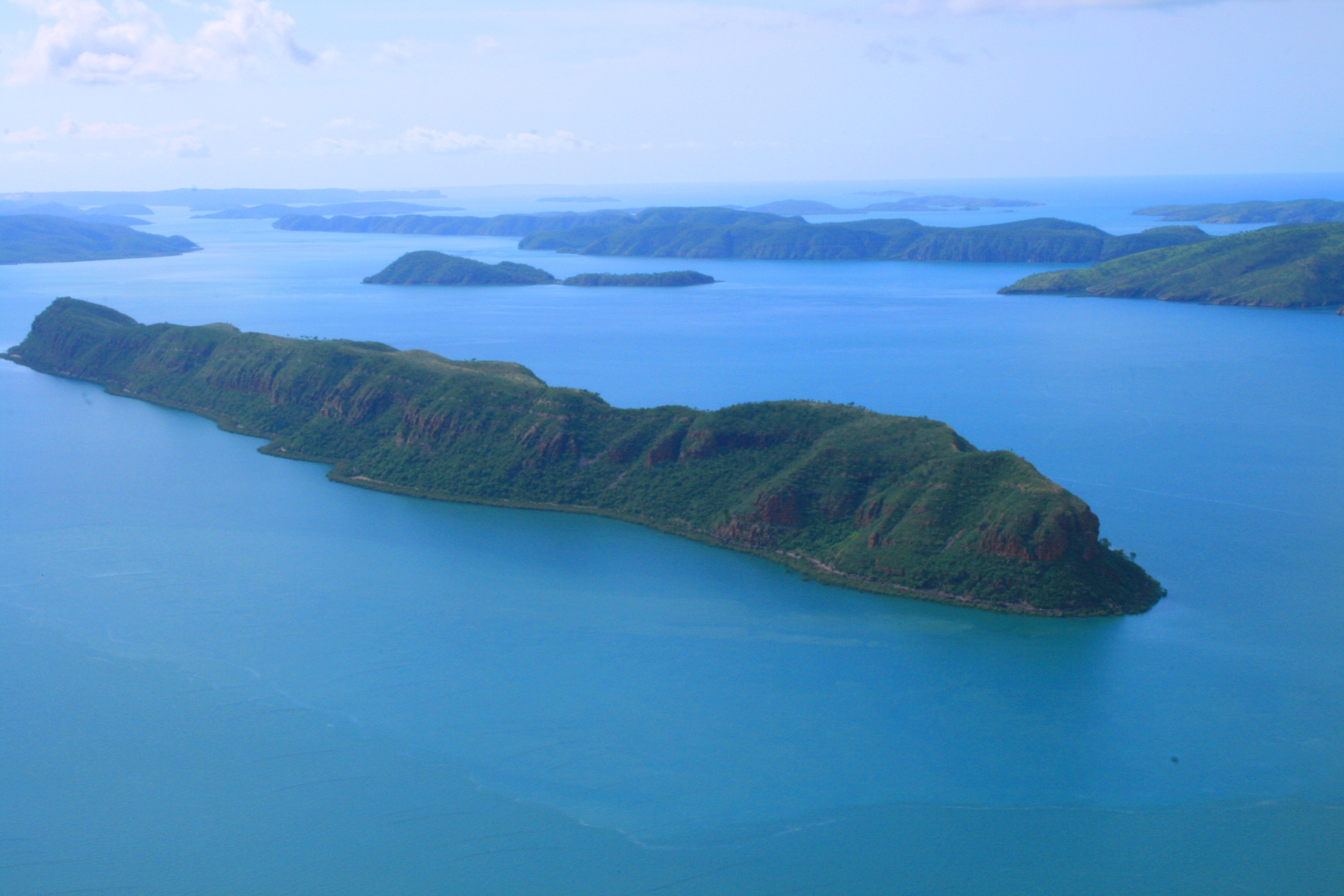

The Buccaneer Archipelago is a group of islands off the coast of Western Australia near the town of Derby in the Kimberley region. The closest inhabited place is Bardi located about 54 kilometres (34 mi) from the western end of the island group.

As of 2020, a new marine park was planned to cover some of the islands of the Buccaneer group, to be known as the Mayala Marine Park. This will be separate from the Maiyalam Marine Park, which will cover other islands of the group, and will become part of four marine parks making up the Lalang-gaddam Marine Park.

== History ==
Aboriginal Australians have lived in the Kimberley region for thousands of years. The traditional owners of the area are the Mayala group, made up of the Yawijibaya and Unggarranggu peoples, although the Bardi people have traditional rights of fishing and trochus collecting.

The archipelago was named after the English buccaneer and privateer William Dampier, who charted the area in 1688, by Philip Parker King in August 1821.

== Description ==
The archipelago, covering over 50 square kilometres (19 sq mi), is located at the head of King Sound and is composed of about 800 islands found between King Sound and Collier Bay near Yampi Sound. The area experiences a huge tidal range, of over 12 metres (39 ft), which once wreaked havoc on the pearling fleet that operated in the area last century. The islands' rocks are over 2 billion years old, as is the surrounding coastline. The islands themselves were formed more recently as a result of rising sea levels, creating a drowned coastline. The rocks are ancient Precambrian sandstones. The islands are generally rocky, many with high cliffs. The islands are in almost pristine condition as a result of their isolation and difficulty of access. Some are sparsely vegetated with patches of rain-forest, and areas fringed with mangroves where silt has built up.

== New marine park ==
In December 2020 indicative joint management plans for the creation of a new marine park, co-designed by traditional owners and the state government's Department of Biodiversity, Conservation and Attractions, along with three Indigenous land use agreements, were published. The proposal is open for public comment until May 2021. It is part of the "Plan for Our Parks" government initiative, which also sees the expansion and consolidation of the Lalang-garram / Camden Sound, Lalang-garram / Horizontal Falls and North Lalang-garram marine parks. The new park is to be gazetted as the Mayala Marine Park. (This is separate from the Maiyalam Marine Park, which will cover other islands of the group, and will become part of four marine parks making up the Lalang-gaddam Marine Park.)

== Islands ==
The Landgate survey of the archipelago excludes "Islands south of Bedford Islands and Hidden Island, including High, Sunday, Mermaid, Long and nearby islands...". It groups the islands by location, as follows:

- North-east group: Macleay Island(s), Conway Island, King Island, and Crabbe Island.
- South-east group: McIntyre, Bathurst, Irvine, Flora, Kathleen, Wangania, Tanner, Cockatoo, and Usborne Islands; also, Black Rock.
- West group: Caffarelli Island, Cleft Island, Fraser, Admiral, Bruen and King Hall, Longitude, Powerful Island and Islands, and numerous others.
- South-west group: Bedford, Godsmark, Asshlyn, Goat, and Pope Islands.

The Encyclopaedia Britannica also refers to "four clusters", and cites Macleay Island as the largest in the archipelago.

The following table includes some of the islands mentioned above.

| Island | Area | Location |
|---|---|---|
| Admiral Island (Western Australia) | | 16°04′00″S 123°24′06″E |
| Bathurst Island (Western Australia) | | 16°02′41″S 123°31′57″E |
| Bedford Islands | | 16°09′29″S 123°20′11″E |
| Bruen Island | | 16°04′00″S 123°22′45″E |
| Byron Island (Buccaneer Archipelago) | | 16°09′45″S 123°26′55″E |
| Caffarelli Island | 2.12 km^{2} (0.82 sq mi) | 16°02"36'S 123°16"48'E (lighthouse) |
| Cleft Island (Western Australia) | | 16°02′16″S 123°21′01″E |
| Cockatoo Island (Western Australia) | | 16°05′55″S 123°37′00″E |
| Fraser Island (Western Australia) | | 16°03′28″S 123°21′51″E |
| Goat Island (Western Australia) | | |
| Hidden Island | 19.7 km^{2} (8 sq mi) | 16°13′32″S 123°28′03″E |
| Irvine Island | 9 km^{2} (3 sq mi) | 16°04′35″S 123°32′14″E |
| King Hall Island | | 16°04′52″S 123°24′29″E |
| Koolan Island | 27.1 km^{2} (10 sq mi) | 16°07′31″S 123°44′18″E |
| Long Island (Western Australia) | 11 km^{2} (4 sq mi). | 16°34′26″S 123°22′11″E |
| Longitude Island | | 16°03′34″S 123°24′01″E |
| Powerful Island | | 16°05′57″S 123°25′50″E |
| Sunday Island (King Sound) | 13.3 km^{2} (5 sq mi) | 16°24′25″S 123°11′13″E |

== See also ==
- Adele Island
