= Yawajaba Island =

Island in the Kimberley region of Western Australia

Yawajaba
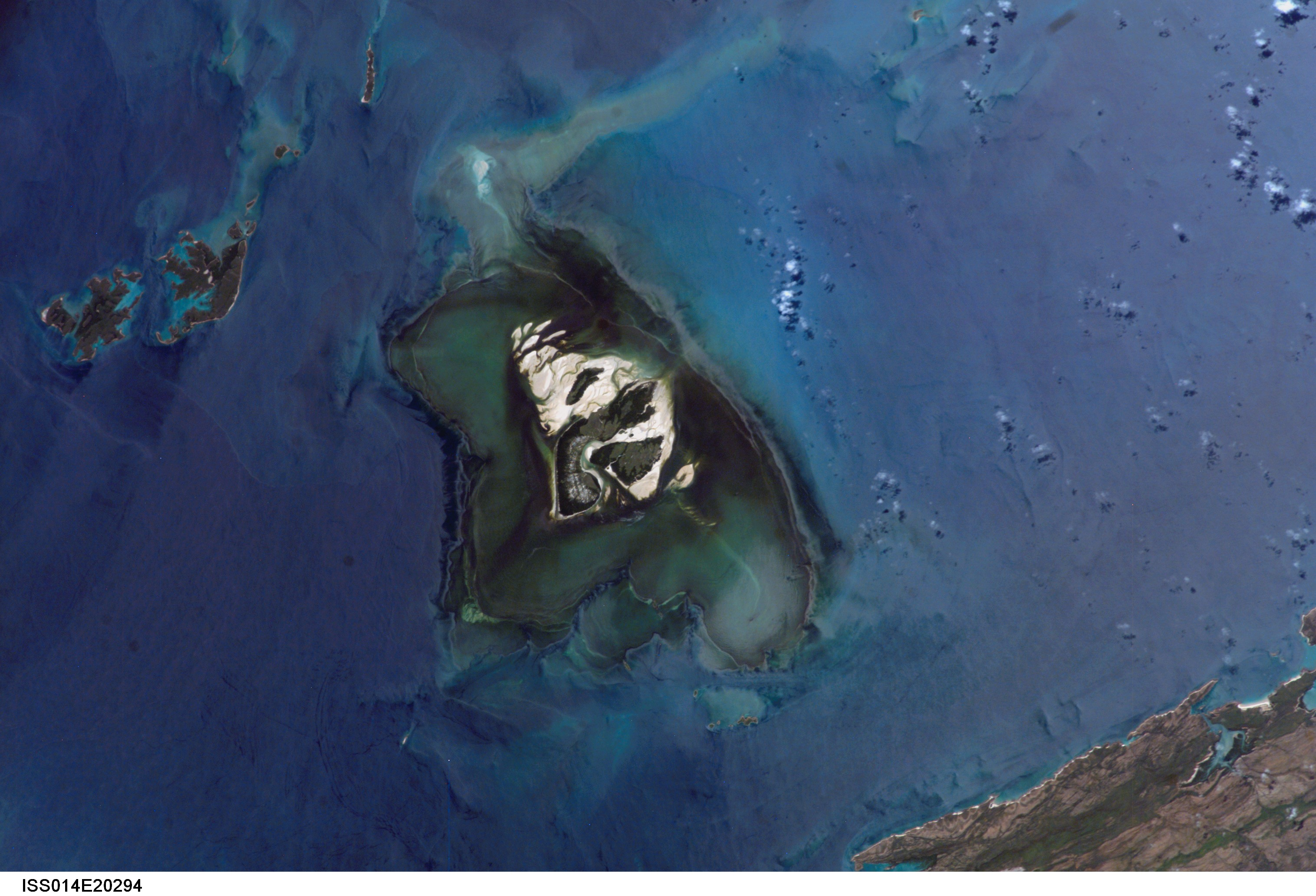
- Satellite image of Yawajaba Island taken by ISS Expedition 14

- Location within Western Australia

Geography
- Location: Camden Sound
- Coordinates: 15°57′32″S 124°12′23″E

Administration
- Australia

Yawajaba Island, often referred to as Montgomery Island, is an island off the Kimberley coast of Western Australia.

The island is approximately 22 kilometres (14 mi) off-shore with a total area of about 230 hectares (568 acres) and is made up of three islands in very close proximity to each other. It is at the southern end of the Camden Sound and is surrounded by Montgomery Reef.

The island is found approximately 120 kilometres (75 mi) north-east of Bardi.

Composed of sand and mangroves, it is the largest island within the Montgomery reef system.
