= Koh Rong Marine National Park =

National park in Cambodia

Coordinates: 10°42′N 103°16′E

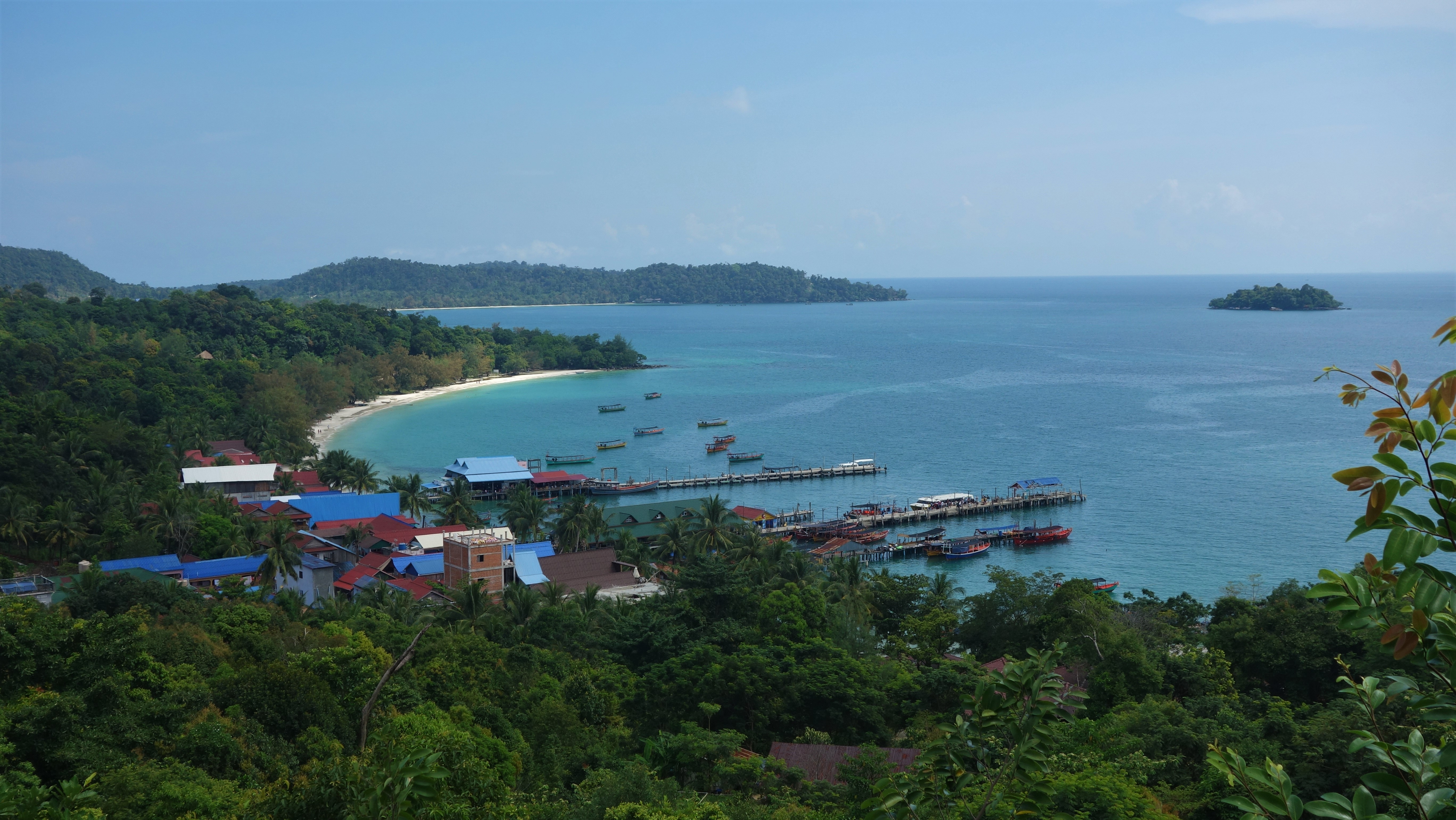
Koh Rong

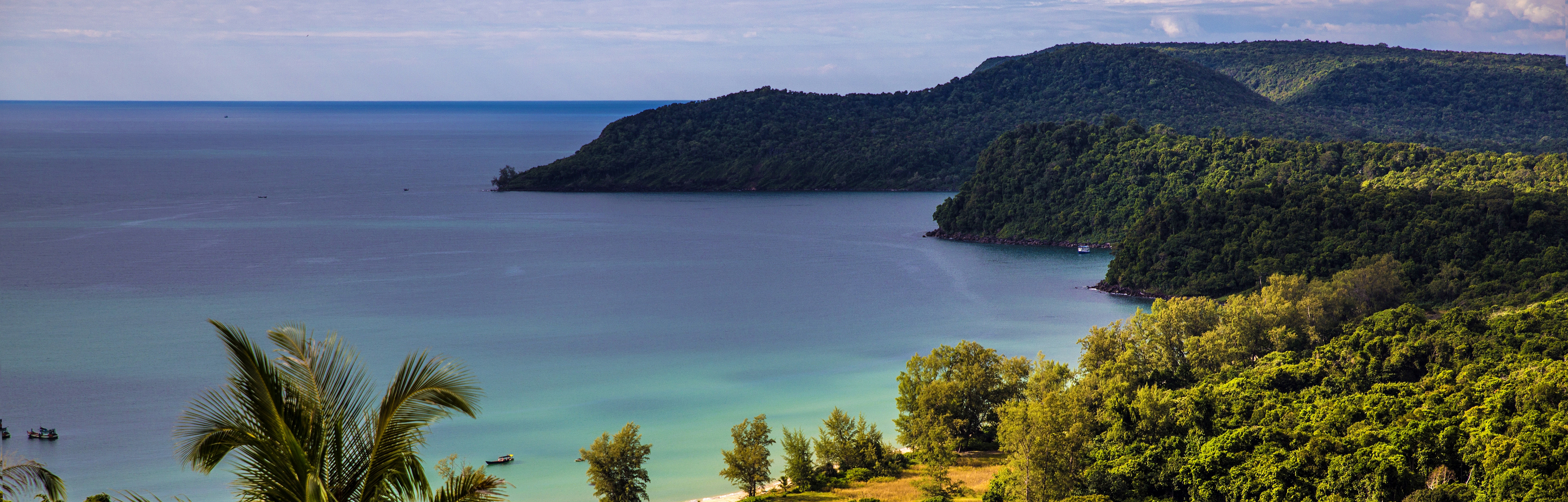
West coast of Koh Rong Sanloem

Koh Rong Marine National Park is a national park in Preah Sihanouk province, Cambodia. Established in February 2018, it is the country's first marine national park. It covers 524 km^{2} of land and water within it, and encompasses the seven islands of the Koh Rong Archipelago; Koh Rong, Koh Rong Sanloem, Koh Oun, Koh Song Saa, Koh Tatiem, Koh Touch, Koh Manoa Krav and Koh Manoa Knong. The Ministry of Environment is the responsible governing agency.

== Important Bird Area ==
The archipelago has been designated an Important Bird Area (IBA) by BirdLife International because it supports a significant population of Malaysian plovers.
