= Inubōsaki Marine Park =

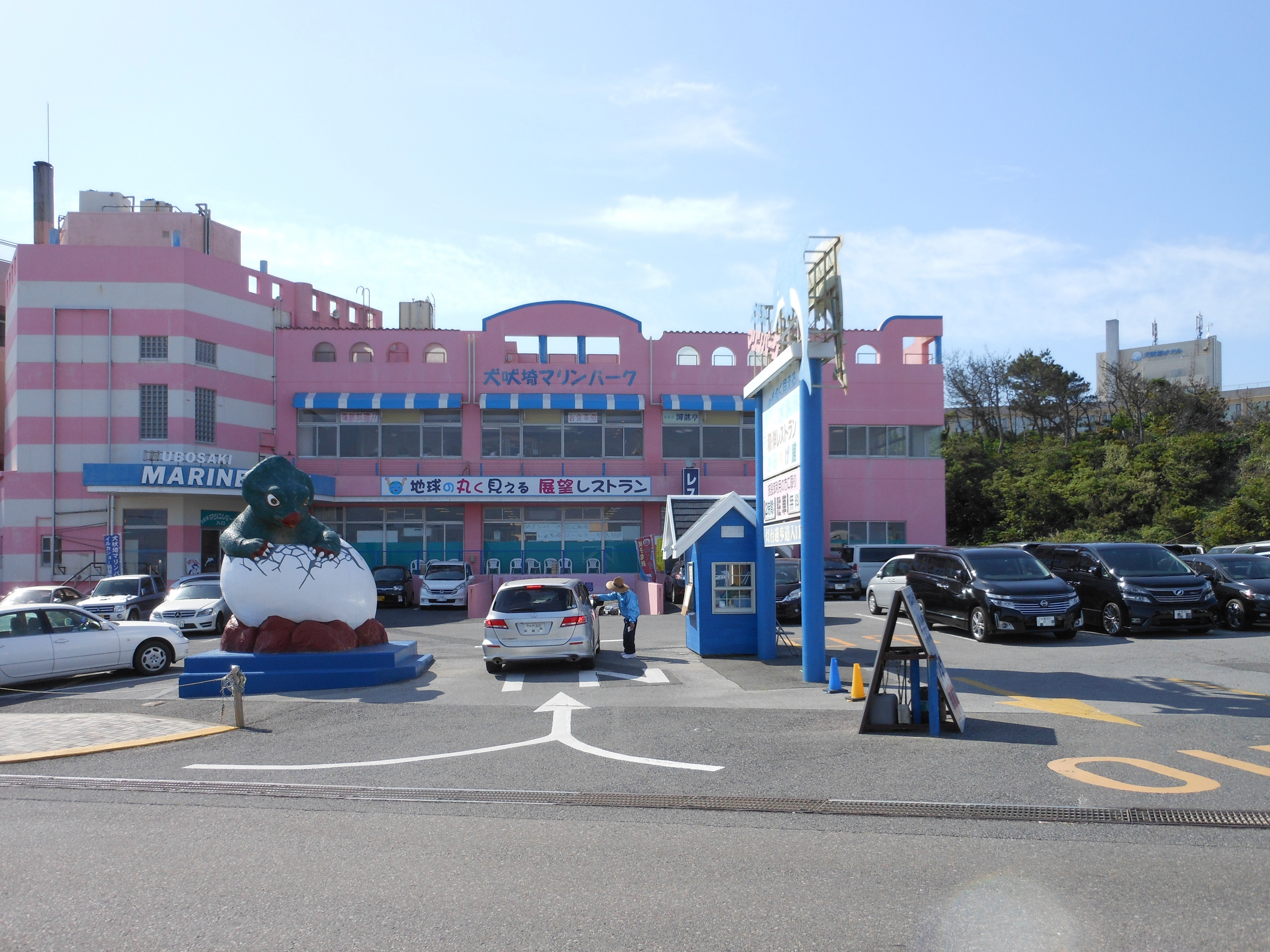
- Interactive map of Inubōsaki Marine Park
- Date opened: 13 July 1954
- Location: Chōshi, Chiba Prefecture, Japan
- No. of animals: 2,500
- No. of species: 230

Inubōsaki Marine Park was a public aquarium and marine park located in Chōshi, Chiba Prefecture. It opened in 1954 and underwent renovation in 1993.
It was closed on 31 January 2018, with the owners attributing the decision to a significant decline in visitors after the 2011 Tōhoku earthquake and nuclear crisis.

== After closure ==
In August 2018, the closed site drew controversy when drone footage shared on social media revealed that animals were still present on the premises, including Honey, a female bottlenose dolphin, 46 Humboldt penguins, and hundreds of fish and reptiles. Although employees continued to feed and care for the animals, several organizations sought to rehome or rehabilitate them with the goal of releasing them back into the wild. In March 2020, Honey died of enteritis.
