= Admiral Island (Western Australia) =

Island in Kimberley region of Western Australia

Coordinates: 16°04′00″S 123°24′06″E

Admiral Island is located in the Buccaneer Archipelago off the Kimberley Coast of Western Australia.
