= Unggarrangu =

Aboriginal Australian people of Western Australia

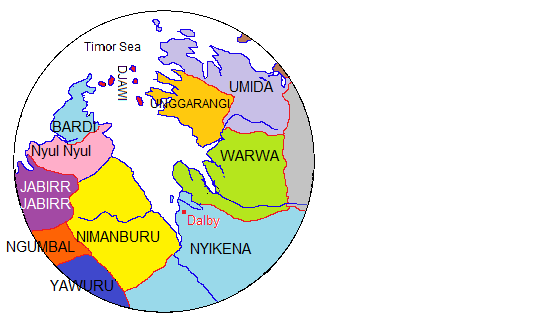
Traditional lands of Aboriginal tribes around Derby, WA

The Unggarranggu, also traditionally transcribed as Ongkarango, are an Aboriginal Australian people of the Kimberley region of Western Australia.

Along with the Yawijibaya people, they are the traditional owners of Buccaneer Archipelago, off Derby, together known as the Mayala group for native title purposes.

== Language ==
The Unggarranggu spoke a Worrorran language. What little is known of it was taken down by Howard Coate in the 1960s.

== Country ==
The Unggarranggu by Norman Tindale's estimate had a domain extending over roughly 1,000 square kilometres (400 mi^{2}), ranging from the northeastern area of King Sound, the eastern side of Stokes Bay, and reaching north as far as Crawford Bay. They also were present on Helpman Island and those islands of the eastern part of the sound as far as Caffarelli. Their continental extension ran no more than 16 kilometres (10 mi) inland.

== Society ==
The Unggarranggu were basically a coastal people dwelling on the mainland, but were on close terms with the more maritime Umiida. Like the Umiida they plied rafts fashioned from mangrove woods, with which they would sail out to places like the island of Wilima off the mouth of Meda River, close to Warrwa territory.

== Alternative names ==
- Ongkarang
- O:kwata (language name)
- Unggarangi

== Sources ==
- "AIATSIS map of Indigenous Australia". AIATSIS. 14 May 2024.
- "Tindale Tribal Boundaries" (PDF). Department of Aboriginal Affairs, Western Australia. September 2016. Archived from the original (PDF) on 8 March 2016.
- McGregor, William B. (2013). The Languages of the Kimberley, Western Australia. Routledge. ISBN 978-1-134-39602-3.
- Tindale, Norman Barnett (1974). "Ongkarango (WA)". Aboriginal Tribes of Australia: Their Terrain, Environmental Controls, Distribution, Limits, and Proper Names. Australian National University. ISBN 978-0-708-10741-6. Archived from the original on 20 March 2020.
