= Byron Island (Buccaneer Archipelago) =

Island in Western Australia

Coordinates: 16°09′45″S 123°26′55″E

Byron Island is located in the Buccaneer Archipelago, off the Kimberley coast of Western Australia.
