= Marine park =

Protected marine area for conservation purposes

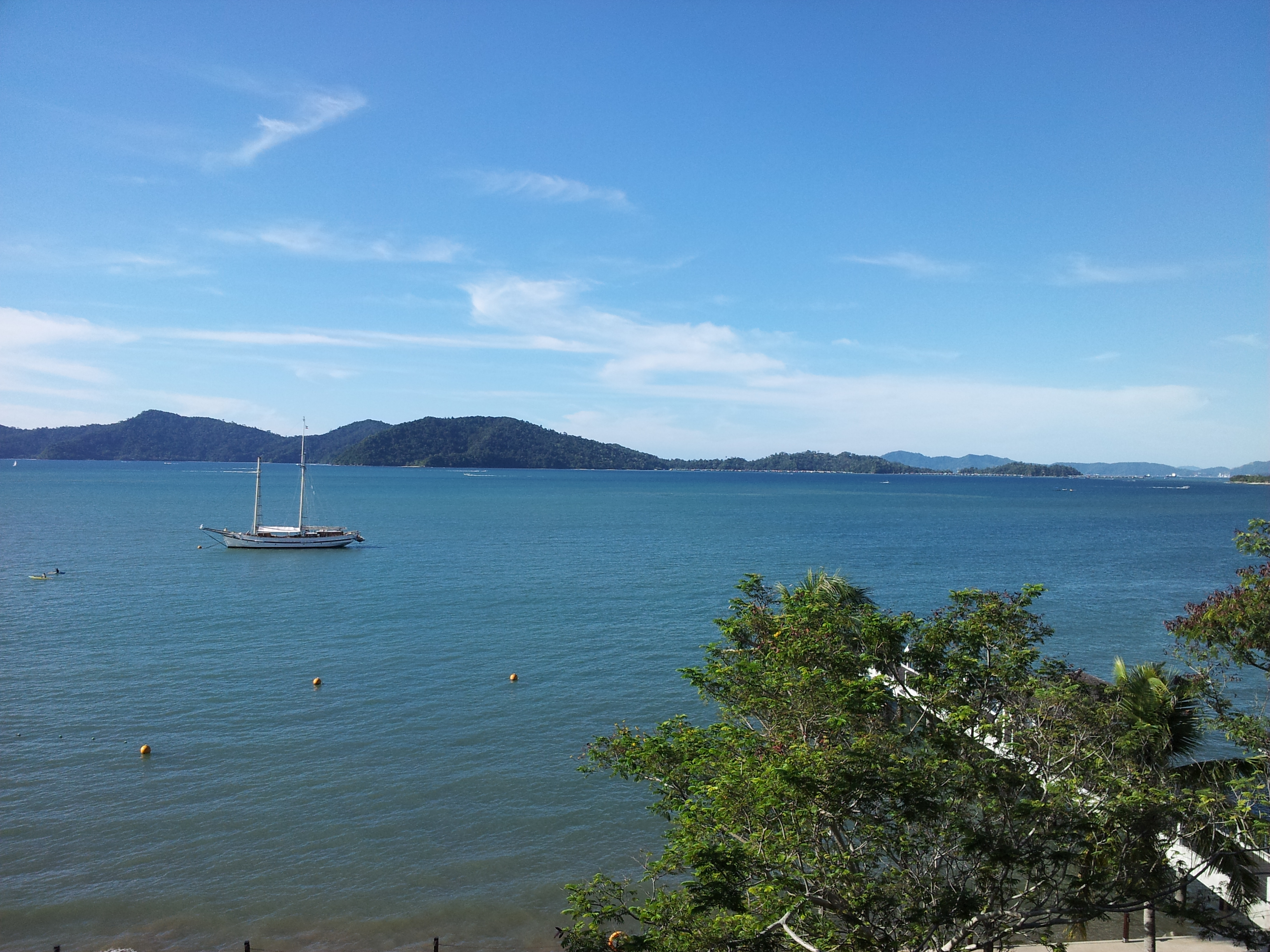
Tunku Abdul Rahman National Park

A marine park is a designated park consisting of an area of sea (or lake) set aside to achieve ecological sustainability, promote marine awareness and understanding, enable marine recreational activities, and provide benefits for Indigenous peoples and coastal communities. Most marine parks are managed by national governments, and organized like 'watery' national parks, whereas marine protected areas and marine reserves are often managed by a subnational entity or non-governmental organization, such as a conservation authority.

The largest marine park used to be the Great Barrier Reef Marine Park in Australia, at 350,000 km^{2} until 2010, when the United Kingdom announced the opening of the Chagos Marine Park or Chagos Archipelago.

Although for many uses it is sufficient to designate the boundaries of the marine park and to inform commercial fishing boats and other maritime enterprises, some parks have gone to additional effort to make their wonders accessible to visitors. These can range from glass-bottomed boats and small submarines, to windowed undersea tubes.

In New Zealand a marine reserve is an area which has a higher degree of legal protection than marine parks for conservation purposes.

In New South Wales, there are planned marine parks which will stretch along the coastline of the entire state.

France and its territories are home to nine marine parks, known as parc naturel marin.

== List of marine parks ==
=== Africa ===
- Glorioso Islands Marine Natural Park, Glorioso Islands
- Kisite-Mpunguti Marine National Park, Kenya
- Mayotte Marine Natural Park, Mayotte

=== Americas ===
- Bonaire National Marine Park, Bonaire
- Half Moon Caye Natural Monument, Belize
- Hol Chan Marine Reserve, Belize
- Montego Bay Marine Park, Jamaica
- Pedra da Risca do Meio Marine State Park, Brazil
- Martinique Marine Natural Park, Martinique
- Saba National Marine Park, Saba

==== Chile ====
- Juan Fernández National Marine Park, Juan Fernández Islands
- Nazca-Desventuradas National Marine Park, Desventuradas Islands
- Motu Motiro Hiva Marine Park, Rapa Nui
- Cabo de Hornos e Islas Diego Ramírez National Marine Park, Cape Horn
- Francisco Coloane Marine and Coastal Protected Area, Brunswick Peninsula
- Islas Damas Conservation Area Reserve
- Isla Chañaral Conservation Area Reserve, Chañaral Island
- Putemún Conservation Area Reserve, Chiloé Island
- Pullinque Conservation Area Reserve, Ancud
- La Rinconada Conservation Area Reserve, Antofagasta

==== Canada ====
- Fathom Five National Marine Park
- Gwaii Haanas National Marine Conservation Area Reserve
- Lake Superior National Marine Conservation Area
- Saguenay–St. Lawrence Marine Park

==== Mexico ====
- Alto Golfo de California Biosphere Reserve
- Arrecifes de Cozumel National Park
- Cabo Pulmo National Park, Mexico
- San Lorenzo Marine Archipelago National Park

==== United States ====
- Allan H. Treman State Marine Park
- Dry Tortugas National Park
- John Pennekamp Coral Reef State Park
- Thunder Bay National Marine Sanctuary
- Biscayne National Park

=== Asia ===
==== Cambodia ====
- Koh Rong Marine National Park

==== China ====
- Changdao National Marine Park
- Meizhoudao National Marine Park
- Weizhou Coral Reef National Park

==== Hong Kong ====
- Marine parks in Hong Kong:
- Cape D'Aguilar Marine Reserve
- Hoi Ha Wan Marine Park
- Sha Chau and Lung Kwu Chau Marine Park
- Tung Ping Chau Marine Park
- Yan Chau Tong Marine Park

==== India ====
- Gulf of Mannar Marine National Park, Tamil Nadu
- Marine National Park, Gulf of Kachchh, Gujarat

==== Indonesia ====
- Karimunjawa National Park, Java
- Kepulauan Seribu National Park, Java
- Komodo National Park, Nusa Tenggara
- Bunaken National Park, Sulawesi
- Kepulauan Togean National Park, Sulawesi
- Kepulauan Wakatobi National Park, Sulawesi
- Taka Bone Rate National Park, Sulawesi
- Teluk Cenderawasih National Park, Papua

==== Japan ====
- Inubōsaki Marine Park

==== Malaysia ====
- Perhentian Islands
- Redang Island
- Pulau Tenggol
- Sipadan
- Tioman Island
- Pulau Sibu
- Pulau Pemanggil
- Tunku Abdul Rahman National Park
- Tun Mustapha Marine Park
- Tun Sakaran Marine Park
- Turtle Islands National Park

==== Philippines ====
- Apo Reef
- Tubbataha Reef
- Ocean Adventure

==== Singapore ====
- Sisters' Island Marine Park

==== Taiwan ====
- Dongsha Atoll National Park
- South Penghu Marine National Park

==== Thailand ====
- Tarutao National Marine Park

=== Europe ===
- Karaburun-Sazan National Marine Park, Albania
- Marine Natural Park of Cap Corse and the Agriate, Cap Corse and the Agriates, Corsica
- Arcachon Bay Marine Natural Park, Arcachon Bay, France
- Gironde Estuary and Pertuis Sea Marine Natural Park, western France
- Gulf of Lion Marine Natural Park, Gulf of Lion, France
- Iroise Marine Natural Park, Brittany, France
- Marine Natural Park of the Picardy Estuaries and the Opal Sea, Picardy and Côte d'Opale, France
- Zakynthos Marine Park, Greece
- Alonnisos Marine Park, Greece
- Kosterhavet National Park, Bohuslän, Sweden
- Ytre Hvaler National Park, Norway
- Færder National Park, Norway
- Jomfruland National Park, Norway
- Raet National Park, Norway
- Pembrokeshire Coast National Park, Wales
- Plymouth Sound National Marine Park, England
- Ponta Do Pargo Marine Natural Park, Madeira, Portugal
- Cape Girão Marine Natural Park, Madeira, Portugal
- North Aegean Marine National Park, Turkey
- Fethiye–Kaş Marine National Park, Turkey

=== High seas ===
Nearly all existing marine reserves have been set close to shore, mostly in territorial waters. A main reason for this lies in the fragmented nature of maritime governance in international waters, the poor enforcement of existing regulations in the High seas, plus the difficult co-management that would be required of countries often in conflict. How to circumvent such obstacles? In 2011, based on unique biological, geological and oceanographic features, the Mediterranean Science Commission proposed the creation of eight large international, coast-to coast "Marine Peace Parks" in the Mediterranean Sea where no coastal point is farther than 200 nautical miles from waters under another jurisdiction. The trans-frontier structure of such 'Peace' Parks puts this problem aside, encouraging the local Governments involved to join forces in the pursuit of a cause higher than their national interest without prejudice to current national claims .

Greenpeace is campaigning for the "doughnut holes" of the western pacific to be declared as marine reserves. They are also campaigning for 40 percent of the world's oceans to be protected as marine reserves.

=== Oceania ===
==== Australia ====
===== Australian government =====
The Australian Government manages an estate of marine protected areas (MPA) that are Commonwealth reserves under the Environment Protection and Biodiversity Conservation Act 1999 (EPBC Act).

- Ashmore Reef Marine National Nature Reserve
- Cartier Island Marine Reserve
- Cod Grounds Commonwealth Marine Reserve
- Coringa-Herald National Nature Reserve
- Elizabeth and Middleton Reefs Marine National Nature Reserve
- Great Australian Bight Commonwealth Marine Reserve
- Great Barrier Reef Marine Park
- Heard Island and McDonald Islands Marine Reserve
- Kimberley Marine Park
- Lihou Reef National Nature Reserve (Coral Sea Island Territory)
- Lord Howe Island Marine Park (Commonwealth Waters)
- Macquarie Island Marine Park
- Mermaid Reef Marine National Nature Reserve
- Ningaloo Marine Park (Commonwealth waters)
- Solitary Islands Marine Reserve (Commonwealth Waters)
- South-east Commonwealth Marine Reserve Network

===== New South Wales =====
- Solitary Islands Marine Park

===== Queensland =====
- Moreton Bay Marine Park

===== South Australia =====
As of December 2013, the following marine parks have been declared under the Marine Parks Act 2007 (SA) :

- Eastern Spencer Gulf Marine Park
- Encounter Marine Park
- Far West Coast Marine Park
- Franklin Harbor Marine Park
- Gambier Islands Group Marine Park
- Investigator Marine Park
- Lower South East Marine Park
- Lower Yorke Peninsula Marine Park
- Neptune Islands Group Marine Park
- Nuyts Archipelago Marine Park
- Sir Joseph Banks Group Marine Park
- Southern Kangaroo Island Marine Park
- Southern Spencer Gulf Marine Park]]
- Thorny Passage Marine Park
- Upper Gulf St Vincent Marine Park
- Upper South East Marine Park
- Upper Spencer Gulf Marine Park
- West Coast Bays Marine Park
- Western Kangaroo Island Marine Park

===== Victoria =====
The state of Victoria has protected approximately 5.3% of coastal waters. In June 2002, legislation was passed to establish 13 Marine National Parks and 11 Marine Sanctuaries. Victoria is the first jurisdiction in the world to create an entire system of highly protected Marine National Parks at the same time. Additional areas are listed as Marine Parks or Marine Reserves, which provides a lower level of protection and allows activities such as commercial and recreational fishing.

The marine national parks are:

- Bunurong Marine National Park
- Cape Howe Marine National Park
- Churchill Island Marine National Park
- Corner Inlet Marine National Park
- Discovery Bay Marine National Park
- French Island Marine National Park
- Ninety Mile Beach Marine National Park
- Point Addis Marine National Park
- Point Hicks Marine National Park
- Port Phillip Heads Marine National Park
- Twelve Apostles Marine National Park
- Wilsons Promontory Marine National Park
- Yaringa Marine National Park

===== Western Australia =====
Kimberley region:

- Bardi Jawi Marine Park (proposed), in Bardi Jawi country.
- Lalang-gaddam Marine Park (in planning stages; formerly Great Kimberley Marine Park), which will cover Dambimangari waters:
  - Lalang-garram / Camden Sound Marine Park
  - Lalang-garram / Horizontal Falls Marine Park
  - North Lalang-garram Marine Park
  - Maiyalam Marine Park (gazetted 2020/21), covering the Buccaneer Archipelago
- North Kimberley Marine Park, in Uunguu waters.

Gascoyne region:

- Shark Bay Marine Park

==== Micronesia ====
- Enipein Pah, near Pohnpei

==== New Zealand ====
- Hauraki Gulf Marine Park
- Mimiwhangata Marine Park
- Tawharanui Marine Park

==== Papua New Guinea ====
- Papua Barrier Reef

== See also ==
- Marine protected area
- Marine reserve
