= Cockatoo Island (Western Australia) =

Island in the Kiimberley region of Western Australia

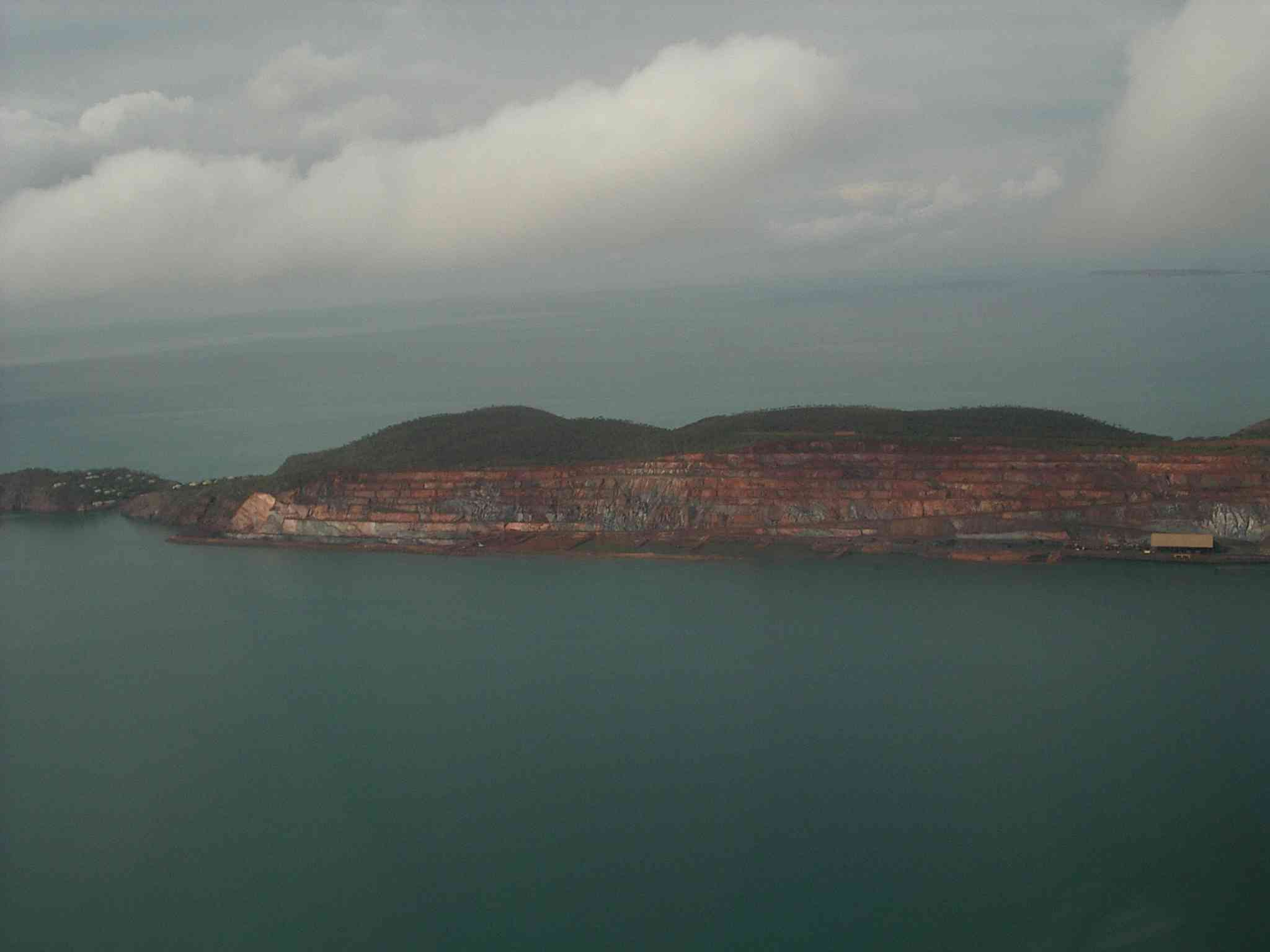
- Cockatoo Island approached by air from the south-west. The mine working along western edge of the island and the townsite at the northern end (left of photo) are visible.

Geography
- Coordinates: 16.0939142°S 123.6091835°E
- Archipelago: Buccaneer
- Adjacent to: Indian Ocean
- Area: 12 sq mi (31 km^{2})

Cockatoo Island is an island in the Buccaneer Archipelago off the coast of Western Australia near the town of Derby. It was mined for iron ore by BHP from 1951 until 1984. Koolan Island is a neighbouring island that was also mined by BHP for high grade iron ore. It was most recently mined by Perth-based mining company, Pluton Resources until the company was placed under administration in September 2015.

== History ==
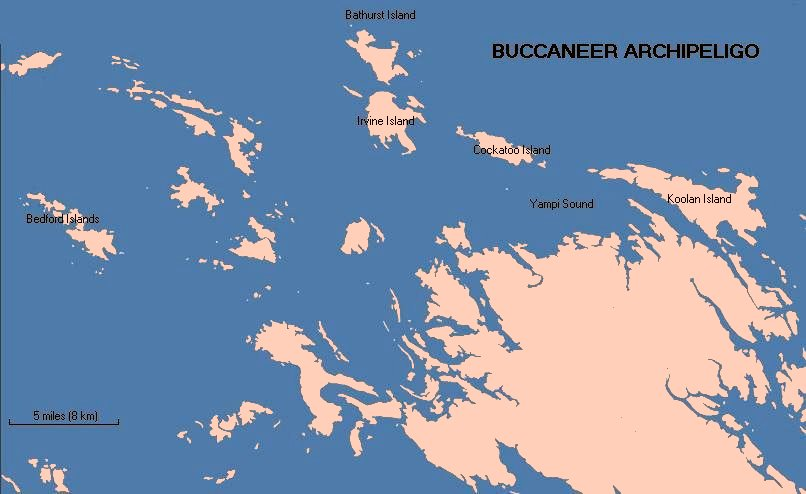
Buccaneer Archipelago

The ironstone of Cockatoo Island was known to pearl luggers in the 1880s, who used it as ballast on their voyages. Australian Iron & Steel acquired leases to the island's mineral deposits in 1928. That company became a subsidiary of BHP, in 1935, bringing with it the leases. The island was first surveyed in 1930, then again more comprehensively in 1936. The island was evacuated with the outbreak of World War II and work on the deposit did not resume until 1944.

By October 1945 over 100 men were employed on Cockatoo Island and work was underway laying a foundation for the processing plant, building a jetty and laying out the township. Iron ore mining began in 1951. The first shipment of iron ore from the island was made in the vessel Iron Yampi, which was purpose-built at the Whyalla shipyard. It was one of a fleet of four bulk-carriers built to transport the ore for smelting at Australian steelworks. Iron Kimberley was another of them.

In 1952, the island's population numbered 150. By 1954, the mine was capable of shipping up to 2 million tonnes of iron ore annually. The townsite established by BHP contained a school, movie theatre, and even a lockup prison. BHP continued to operate the mine and manage the township until 1984 when the ore body had been mined down to sea level.

During the 1980s businessman Alan Bond and wife Eileen, opened a tourist resort using the old mining village's infrastructure. The resort was closed and sold to HWE Mining, who provided the chalets for their workers to use. HWE Mining and Portman Mining re-opened operations in the 1990s by first retreating waste-rock from old BHP dumps, then forming a seawall and commencing mining below sea level.

In the 21st century, Perth-based company Pluton Resources mined there, until the company entered administration in September 2015.

In 2020, Cockatoo Island Mining Pty Ltd, whose directors reside in Australia, India, Hong Kong and mainland China, was granted a lease for the island until 2032, after consideration by the Foreign Investment Review Board. Concern was expressed by Senator Concetta Fierravanti-Wells and others that this lease was near the mainland Yampi Sound Training Area used by the Australian Defence Force.

== Climate ==
Cockatoo Island possesses a tropical savanna climate (Köppen: Aw) with a short, sweltering wet season from December to March and a long dry season from April to November. Positioned within the Timor Sea, temperatures remain hot year-round. Average maxima vary from 33.4 °C (92.1 °F) in April to 28.7 °C (83.7 °F) in July, while average minima fluctuate between 27.6 °C (81.7 °F) in December and 22.1 °C (71.8 °F) in July. Precipitation is moderate, with the island averaging 970.2 mm (38.20 in) of rain per annum. Rainfall is not frequent, being distributed over 36.8 precipitation days (exceeding 1.0 mm (0.039 in)), and is strongly concentrated in the austral summer. The locality is very sunny, receiving 181.9 clear days and only 37.0 cloudy days annually. Extreme temperatures have ranged from 39.6 °C (103.3 °F) on 11 October 1979 to 17.1 °C (62.8 °F) on 13 July 1968.

Climate data for Cockatoo Island (16.10°S 123.62°E) (91 m (299 ft) AMSL) (1984-2014 data)
Month	Jan	Feb	Mar	Apr	May	Jun	Jul	Aug	Sep	Oct	Nov	Dec	Year
Record high °C (°F)	39.0 (102.2)	37.8 (100.0)	37.0 (98.6)	38.5 (101.3)	36.8 (98.2)	34.3 (93.7)	33.8 (92.8)	34.9 (94.8)	37.2 (99.0)	39.6 (103.3)	37.6 (99.7)	38.5 (101.3)	39.6 (103.3)
Mean daily maximum °C (°F)	32.4 (90.3)	31.9 (89.4)	32.6 (90.7)	33.4 (92.1)	31.7 (89.1)	29.7 (85.5)	28.7 (83.7)	29.1 (84.4)	30.2 (86.4)	31.1 (88.0)	32.2 (90.0)	32.9 (91.2)	31.3 (88.4)
Mean daily minimum °C (°F)	27.0 (80.6)	26.6 (79.9)	27.1 (80.8)	27.2 (81.0)	25.3 (77.5)	23.1 (73.6)	22.1 (71.8)	22.6 (72.7)	24.1 (75.4)	25.6 (78.1)	27.1 (80.8)	27.6 (81.7)	25.5 (77.8)
Record low °C (°F)	21.1 (70.0)	19.6 (67.3)	21.5 (70.7)	20.7 (69.3)	18.3 (64.9)	17.2 (63.0)	17.1 (62.8)	17.9 (64.2)	18.2 (64.8)	22.3 (72.1)	21.0 (69.8)	22.7 (72.9)	17.1 (62.8)
Average precipitation mm (inches)	276.2 (10.87)	271.8 (10.70)	179.3 (7.06)	45.5 (1.79)	66.9 (2.63)	19.9 (0.78)	9.9 (0.39)	1.9 (0.07)	1.4 (0.06)	3.4 (0.13)	6.2 (0.24)	72.4 (2.85)	970.2 (38.20)
Average precipitation days (≥ 1.0 mm)	9.6	9.6	6.3	2.8	2.3	0.7	0.4	0.1	0.1	0.5	0.9	3.5	36.8
Average afternoon relative humidity (%)	70	74	70	55	54	47	52	57	61	66	67	68	62
Average dew point °C (°F)	24.7 (76.5)	24.8 (76.6)	24.6 (76.3)	21.4 (70.5)	19.2 (66.6)	15.0 (59.0)	15.3 (59.5)	17.0 (62.6)	19.3 (66.7)	22.2 (72.0)	23.3 (73.9)	24.3 (75.7)	20.9 (69.7)
Source: Bureau of Meteorology (1948-2014 data)
