= Montgomery Reef =

Reef in the Kimberley region of Western Australia

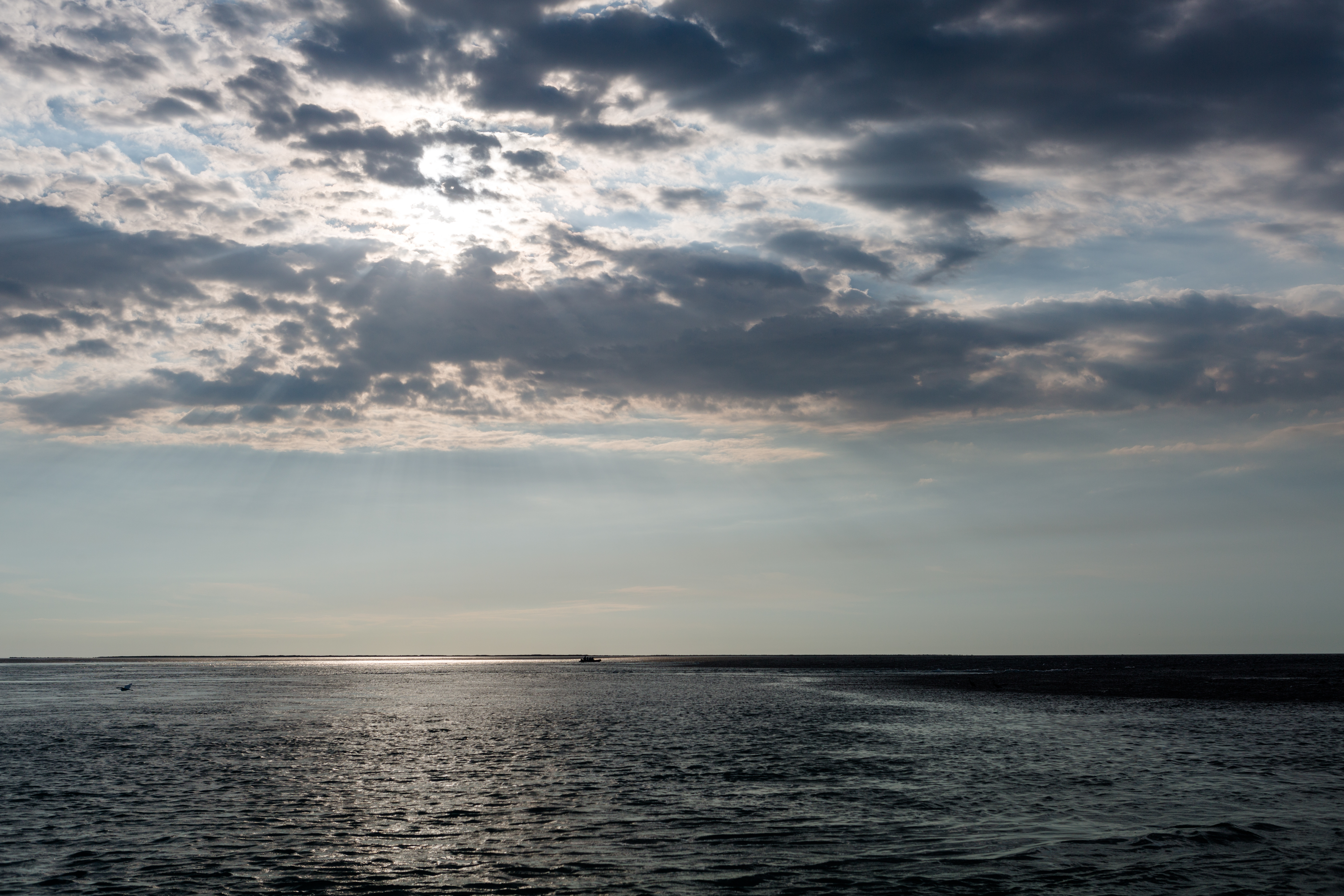
- Montgomery Reef on a late autumn afternoon.
- Interactive map of Montgomery Reef

Geography
- Location: Indian Ocean
- Coordinates: 15°59′36″S 124°14′23″E

Administration
- Commonwealth of Australia
- State: Western Australia
- Reef: Montgomery Reef

Additional information
- Time zone: AWST (UTC+8)

Montgomery Reef is a reef off the Kimberley coast of Western Australia. It is situated at the south western end of Camden Sound and surrounds Yawajaba (Montgomery) Island. With its total area of 400 square kilometres (154 sq mi) (about 80 kilometres (50 mi) in length), it is the world's largest inshore reef. The nearest populated place is Bardi, which is approximately 130 kilometres (81 mi) to the south west.

The reef lies approximately 20 kilometres (12 mi) off shore, opposite Doubtful Bay to the east and Collier Bay to the south. It lies within the Camden Sound Marine Park, which was gazetted in 2012, covering an area of 7,062 square kilometres (2,727 sq mi).

The reef and island were named by Philip Parker King, the first European to sight the island, aboard HMS Mermaid, while exploring the area in 1818. King named the island after the ship's surgeon, Andrew Montgomery. King also named Doubtful Bay.

Montgomery Reef has an unusual wide tidal range, up to 10 metres (33 ft). When the tide is out, vast lagoons, sandstone islets, and a central mangrove island are revealed. The outward movement of the tide forms a torrent of water, creating a river cutting through the reef and hundreds of cascading waterfalls. At low tide, more than 4 metres (13 ft) of reef can be exposed.

While the tide is going out, the waterfalls attract migratory wading birds, feeding turtles, manta rays, black tipped reef sharks, and dugongs. The area is a popular tourist site and has several cruise operators visiting daily.
