= Koolan Island =

Island of Western Australia

Coordinates: 16°07′31″S 123°44′18″E

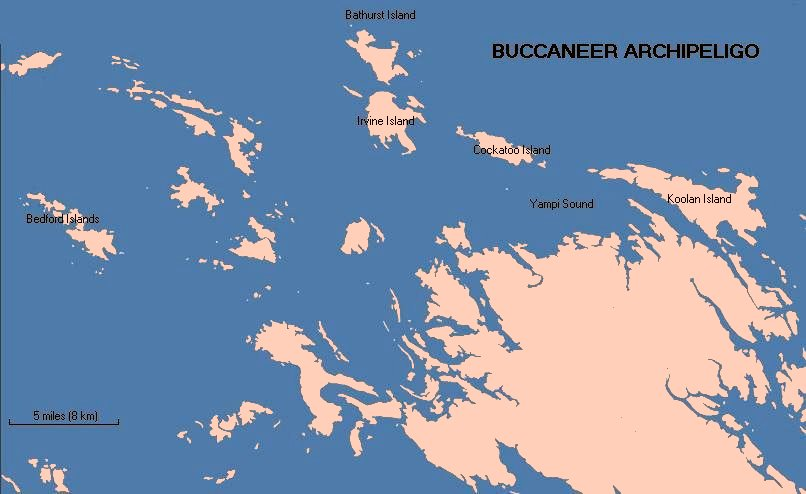

Koolan Island is an island off the Kimberley coast of Western Australia in the Buccaneer Archipelago. It is about 1,900 km (1,181 miles) north of Perth, and about 130 km (81 mi) north of Derby. It hosts deposits of high-grade iron ore.

== Description ==
The island is approximately 13 km (8 mi) in length and 4 km (2.5 mi) at its widest point. It encompasses an area of 2,580 ha (6,375 acres). The island is 750 m (2,460 ft) offshore, with a smaller island, Round Island, between Koolan and the mainland.

Composed of a Paleoproterozoic Statherian-age (1,600 to 1,800 million years old) sedimentary sequence of quartz sandstone, hematitic sandstone, feldspathic sandstone, siltstone, and hematitic conglomerate, the island has a rugged dissected terrain. Ridges have thin stony sandy soils. The highest point of the island is at 168 m (551 ft).

== Mining ==
=== BHP era ===
BHP subsidiary Australian Iron & Steel commenced open-pit mining operations on Koolan and neighbouring Cockatoo Island in 1951, shipping ore on company-owned ships to Port Kembla. By 1963 it had established substantial mining operations there. The Koolan Island mine closed in 1994 after BHP had extracted 68 million tonnes of high-grade haematite ore, averaging 67% iron.

At its peak, Koolan Island had a population of 950 people and had a school, police station, recreation facilities and shops. It had the world's then-longest golf course hole – a 790-metre (2,580 ft) par 7 number 6 which doubled as the island's air strip.

Major rehabilitation of the island was undertaken after the mine closure, with buildings and exotic vegetation removed. Extensive replanting of native species has been undertaken.

=== Aztec–Mount Gibson Iron ===
On completion of mining operations in 1993 the base of Main Pit was 80 metres below sea level. BHP excavated a channel from the ocean to allow seven million cubic metres of sea water to flood the pit, allowing a productive photic zone marine eco-system to develop within the bounds of the former working pit. In 2007 Mount Gibson Iron re-commenced mining at Koolan Island. In 2011 a seawall was completed on the ocean side of Main Pit to allow that pit to be dewatered.

Earlier, in April 2006, the company signed a co-existence agreement with two Aboriginal Australian peoples, the Dambimangari (Dambima/Worrorra-Ngardi) traditional owners of the island. The agreement aims to ensure that 30% of the 220 person workforce is filled by Indigenous people by the eighth year of operation.

On 18 August 2006, Aztec announced that it had signed orders with the Chinese group CITIC for 1.5 MT of ore from 2007. In November 2006, Mount Gibson Iron took over Aztec.

In 2014, the main seawall failed and the mine was flooded. The seawall was rebuilt and reinforced and the pit is being dewatered again as of August 2018. Shipments of iron ore to China recommenced April 2019.

In October 2025 Mount Gibson Iron announced the mine had closed after a rockfall had made the mine unsafe. With the mine scheduled to close in September 2026, it was deemed uneconomic to reopen.

== Aircraft crash ==
On 23 December 1984, a single-engined Cessna 210 aircraft, which had just taken off from the island en route to Broome, struck power lines and somersaulted. Six people were killed.

It appears the aircraft may have been overloaded with passengers and fuel at the time. The plane took off with the wind from the south across the strip rather than over the ocean and submarine rock. The gravel strip at the time had been affected by a cyclone in the area on the previous days.
