= Western Australian Government Gazette =

Government gazette of Western Australia

The Western Australian Government Gazette is the government gazette of Western Australia.

It has been published since 1836. Between 1878 and 1989 it was known as the Government Gazette of Western Australia.

The State Law Publisher's website has all the gazettes available in PDF format.

Some archives and libraries in Western Australia – Battye Library, State Records Office of Western Australia, and Reid Library at the University of Western Australia – have parts of the series as hard copies but in most cases only part of the range is openly available.

== See also ==
- InterSector, history of various government instrumentalities and information about government funded bodies
- List of British colonial gazettes
