= North Kimberley Marine Park =

Marine park in Western Australia

- IUCN category II (national park)
- Location within Western Australia
- Location: Western Australia
- Coordinates: 14.3357°S 125.1671°E
- Area: 1,669,320 ha (6,445.3 sq mi)
- Established: 16 December 2016
- Governing body: Department of Biodiversity, Conservation and Attractions

The North Kimberley Marine Park is the largest state-managed marine park in Western Australia and second largest in Australia. covering 1,845,000 ha (4,560,000 acres) or 18,450 km^{2} (7,120 mi^{2}) about 270 km (170 mi) north-east of Derby. It is located in the Indian Ocean and the Timor Sea, extending from York Sound north-eastwards to the WA border with the Northern Territory.

The park helps to protect the features such as coral reefs, mangroves and beaches, and species such as dugongs, whales, dolphins, sawfish and turtles that inhabit the sea within its boundaries. The Balanggarra, Wunambal Gaambera, Ngarinyin and Miriuwung/ Gajerrong peoples have deep connections to the country, and Balanggarra traditional owners will co-manage part of the park with the Department of Parks and Wildlife. A ten-year management plan was released on 17 December 2018.

The park includes King George River, with its 100 m (330 ft) twin waterfalls, and Cape Londonderry, the northernmost point of Western Australia.

== See also ==
- List of marine parks in Australia (incomplete)
